= Sparkle =

Sparkle or Sparkles may refer to:

- Sparkle (catamaran), a catamaran designed by Angus Primrose
- Sparkle (drink), a lemon-flavored soft drink
- Sparkle, a brand of paper towels owned by Georgia-Pacific
- Sparkle (❇), a form of dingbat
- Sparkles emoji (✨)

== People ==
- Sparkle (singer) (born 1975), American R&B singer
- Sparkle Hayter (born 1958), Canadian journalist
- Sparkle McKnight (born 1991), Trinadadian athlete
- Sparkle Moore (born 1936), American rockabilly singer
- Sparkle L. Sooknanan (born 1983), Trinadadian lawyer
- Sparkle Taylor (born 1995), American basketball player
- "Geeky Sparkles", alias of Kambrea Pratt, American comic-book artist

== Fictional characters ==
- Sparkle Plenty, a character in the Dick Tracy comic strip
- Elisabeth Sparkle, character from The Substance (2024)
- Twilight Sparkle, character from My Little Pony: Friendship is Magic
- Sparkle (Honkai: Star Rail), a playable character in Honkai: Star Rail

== Film ==
- Sparkle (1976 film), an American film released by Warner Bros
- Sparkle (2007 film), an English film starring Stockard Channing
- Sparkle (2012 film), a remake of the original 1976 film
- The Sparkle, a 2023 Canadian documentary short

== Music ==
=== Albums ===
- Sparkle (Sparkle album), 1998
- Sparkle (1976 soundtrack), the soundtrack to the above 1976 film
- Sparkle (2012 soundtrack), the soundtrack to the above 2012 film

=== Extended Plays ===
- Sparkle (Marion EP), 1998

=== Songs ===
- "Sparkle", a song by Diana Ross from the 1979 album The Boss
- "Sparkle", a song by My Life Story from the 1997 album The Golden Mile
- "Sparkle", a song by Phish from the 1993 album Rift
- "Sparkle", a song by Radwimps from the 2016 album Your Name.
- "Sparkle", a song by Sophie Ellis-Bextor from the 2001 album Read My Lips
- "Rule/Sparkle", a 2009 song by Ayumi Hamasaki
- "Tweet Dream / Sparkle", a 2012 song by Fairies

== Computing ==
- Sparkle (software), a free software library designed to simplify software updates in macOS
- Microsoft Expression Blend, a code-named Sparkle, software application
- Sparkle Computer, a Taiwanese electronics firm

== Video games ==
- Sparkle 2 Evo, a 2011 video game
- Sparkle 3 Genesis, a 2015 video game

== Organizations ==
- Sparkle (charity), a trans rights organisation formed in 2005
- Sparkle GMA Artist Center, a talent agency of GMA Network
- Telecom Italia Sparkle, a subsidiary of Telecom Italia

== See also ==
- Spark (disambiguation)
- Sparkler (disambiguation)
- Sparkling (disambiguation)
- SPARQL, an RDF query language
