= SPARC (disambiguation) =

SPARC (Scalable Processor Architecture) is a computer instruction set architecture.

SPARC may also refer to:

== Organizations ==
- Scholarly Publishing and Academic Resources Coalition
- School of the Performing Arts in the Richmond Community, a nonprofit organization in Virginia
- Social and Public Art Resource Center, a community arts center in Venice, California
- Society for the Protection of the Rights of the Child in Pakistan
- SPARC Innovation Program, a research program at Mayo Clinic, and its "See-Plan-Act-Refine-Communicate" method
- Sport and Recreation New Zealand, the former name of Sport New Zealand, a Crown entity
- Stratospheric Processes And their Role in Climate, a project of the World Climate Research Programme
- Summer Program on Applied Rationality and Cognition, a summer program sponsored by the Center for Applied Rationality

== Science and technology ==
- SPARC, Scalable Processor Architecture
- ANSI-SPARC Architecture, a database design standard
- Osteonectin, a glycoprotein also known as SPARC (secreted protein, acidic and rich in cysteine)
- SPARC (tokamak), a proposed compact tokamak fusion experiment to be built by Commonwealth Fusion Systems and MIT based on the ARC fusion reactor
- Spitzer Photometry and Accurate Rotation Curves, a database of galaxy rotation curves collected by the Spitzer Space Telescope

== See also ==
- Spark (disambiguation)
- Sparks (disambiguation)
- Sparq (disambiguation)
- SPAC (disambiguation)
