= Spark =

Spark commonly refers to:

- Spark (fire), a small glowing particle or ember
- Electric spark, a form of electrical discharge

Spark may also refer to:

== People ==
- Spark (surname)
- Jessica Morgan (born 1992; formerly known as Spark), female singer-songwriter from East London

== Companies ==
- Spark, the last-mile delivery service for Walmart
- Spark Architects, an international architectural firm
- Spark (American organization), a Trotskyist group
- Spark Energy, a UK electricity and gas supplier
- Spark Infrastructure, an investor in Australian infrastructure assets
- Spark Networks SE, an online dating company
- Spark New Zealand, a telecommunications company
- Spark Racing Technology, a French motorsport manufacturer specializing in electric racecars
- Spark Unlimited, a computer game developer

== Computer science ==
- Adobe Spark, a suite of media applications developed by Adobe Systems
- Apache Spark, a cluster computing framework
- Cisco Spark (application), a collaboration application and platform now part of the Webex Teams application
- Spark (application), a mobile email application by Readdle
- Spark (cellular automaton), a type of pattern in Conway's Game of Life and related rules
- SPARK (programming language), a variant of the Ada programming language that focuses on high-integrity software
- Spark (XMPP client), an instant messaging client

== Arts, entertainment and media ==
=== Books, comics and periodicals ===
- The Spark, the fortnightly newspaper of Spark (American organization), a Trotskyist group
- The Spark (newspaper), the student newspaper of the University of Reading
- The Spark (magazine), a former free quarterly magazine from Bristol, England
- Spark (comics) or Ayla Ranzz, a member of the Legion of Super-Heroes
- Spark (magazine), the student newspaper of the Victorian College of the Arts Student Union, Australia
- Spark (Matayoshi novel), a 2015 novel by Naoki Matayoshi
- Spark (Twelve Hawks novel), a 2014 novel by John Twelve Hawks
- Spark, the student magazine of Lakota East High School, Ohio, U.S.
- Spark Mag, an online publication founded by the punk band Downtown Boys
- "Spark", in the comics series Girl Genius, a mad scientist with supernatural abilities

=== Film and television ===
- Spark (1998 film), starring Terrence Howard
- Spark: A Burning Man Story, a 2013 documentary
- Spark (2014 film), directed by V. K. Singh
- Spark (2016 film), an animated film
- Spark (2026 film), an Indian thriller film
- Spark (TV series), a British sitcom

=== Music ===
- Spark Records, an American record label
- Spark (British record label)
- Spark Sunderland, a radio station in Sunderland, England

==== Albums ====
- Spark (Alain Johannes album), 2010
- Spark (Drake White album), 2016
- Spark (Hiromi album), 2016
- Spark (Marit Larsen album), 2011
- Spark (Thomas Leeb album), 2004
- The Spark (album), by Enter Shikari, 2017
- Spark (Whitney album), 2022
- The Spark, by Plankeye, 1995

==== Songs ====
- "Spark" (Amy Macdonald song), 2010
- "Spark" (Tori Amos song), 1998
- "Spark", by Assemblage 23 from Compass
- "Spark", by Ed Sheeran from -
- "Spark", by Fitz and the Tantrums from More Than Just a Dream
- "Spark", by The Church from Starfish
- "The Spark" (Afrojack song)
- "The Spark" (Kabin Crew and Lisdoonvarna Crew song)

=== Other arts, entertainment and media ===
- ABC Spark, a Canadian cable channel
- Hibana: Spark, a 2016 Japanese web series
- Spark, a safety net system in gacha games
- Spark (radio show), a culture and technology program produced for the Canadian Broadcasting Corporation
- Project Spark, a "game maker" video game

== Naval vessels ==
- HMS Spark, a British Royal Navy submarine
- USS Spark (1813), a United States Navy brig
- USS Spark (1831), a United States Navy schooner
- USS Spark (IX-196), a United States Navy tank-landing ship

== Cars ==
- Chevrolet Spark, a city car manufactured by GM Korea
- Chevrolet Spark EV, a 5-door hatchback battery electric vehicle
- Wuling Air EV, a battery electric city car, badged as Chevrolet Spark EV in Egypt
- Chevrolet Spark EUV, a battery electric crossover city car manufactured by SAIC-GM-Wuling

== Other uses ==
- Spark Point, a rocky point in the South Shetland Islands
- Spark (horse)
- Spark (mathematics), the smallest number of linearly dependent columns in a matrix
- SPARK (anti-counterfeiting feature)
- SPARK (rocket), an American expendable launch system
- SPARK, an autism research project by Simons Foundation Autism Research Initiative
- Spark-gap transmitter, a technology used to generate radio waves
- Spark or Sinthusa, a genus of butterfly
- Kicksled or spark, a small sled
- TheSpark.com, website which originated SparkNotes
- Hangzhou Spark, a Chinese esports team in the Overwatch League
- Spark, a colloquial term referring to an electrician
- Spark, the leader of Team Instinct in Pokémon Go
- Spark, the Cybertronian equivalent of a heart in the Transformers media franchise
- DJI Spark, a Chinese camera drone
- Nvidia RTX Spark
- Samahan ng Progresibong Kabataan, a youth political organization in the Philippines

== See also ==
- Iskra ("Spark"), a political newspaper of Russian socialist emigrants 1900-1905
- Scînteia ("Spark"), a former Romanian communist newspaper
- Divine spark, a Gnostic and esoteric concept
- SPARC (disambiguation)
- Sparks (disambiguation)
- Sparq (disambiguation)
- Sparx (disambiguation)
