= Sparks =

Sparks may refer to:

== Places ==
- Sparks, Georgia
- Sparks, Kansas
- Sparks, Kentucky
- Sparks, Maryland
- Sparks, Nebraska
- Sparks, Nevada
- Sparks, Oklahoma
- Sparks, Texas
- Sparks, Bell County, Texas
- Sparks, West Virginia

== Books ==
- Sparks (Raffi novel) (1884)
- Sparks (Ally Kennen novel), 2010
- Sparks!, a graphic novel by Ian Boothby and Nina Matsumoto

== Film and TV ==
- Sparks (2013 film), an American indie superhero film
- Sparks (2026 film), an American indie drama film
- Sparks (TV series), a 1996-1998 American television series starring Terrence Howard and James Avery
- Sparks (Matrix character), a character in Enter the Matrix and The Matrix Revolutions
- Sparks (G.I. Joe), a fictional character in the G.I. Joe universe
- Sparks, a fictional football team in Footballers' Wives
- Sparks, one of the four protagonists in the 2023 television series SuperKitties

== Music ==
- Sparks (band), a rock band led by brothers Ron and Russell Mael
  - Sparks (Sparks album), their 1971 debut album
- Sparks (Imogen Heap album) (2014)
- Sparks (Fiction Plane album) (2010)
- Sparks (Sahara Hotnights album) (2009)
- Sparks (Roberto Paci Dalò album) (2007)
- Sparks!, a 1970 album by Melvin Sparks

=== Songs ===
- "Sparks" (Stevie Appleton song)
- "Sparks" (Beach House song)
- "Sparks" (Cover Drive song)
- "Sparks" (Hilary Duff song)
- "Sparks" (Röyksopp song)
- "Sparks" (Coldplay song)
- "Sparks", a song by Kylie Minogue from Kiss Me Once
- "Sparks", a song by Neon Hitch from Eleutheromaniac
- "Sparks", a song by Parkway Drive from Atlas
- "Sparks", a song by t.A.T.u. from Waste Management
- "Sparks", a song by Takanashi Kiara from Point of View
- "Sparks", a song by The Who from Tommy
- "Sparks", a song by Kim Wilde from Catch as Catch Can

== Organizations ==
- Central Sparks, an English women's cricket team
- Los Angeles Sparks, a Women's National Basketball Association team
- Sparks, the youngest age bracket of the Girl Guides of Canada

== Brands ==
- Sparks (drink), a canned alcoholic beverage sold in the United States
- Sparks Steak House, a restaurant in New York City

== Other uses ==
- Sparks (name), a family name (including a list of people and fictional characters)
- Sinthusa or sparks, a genus of butterflies of the Indomalayan realm
- Sparks, a common nickname given to an electrician
- Sparks (fire), an incandescent particle

== See also ==
- SPARCS
- Spark (disambiguation)
- Sparks Street, Ottawa, Canada
- Sparx (disambiguation)
- The Sparks Brothers
