= Sparkler (disambiguation) =

Sparkler or sparklers may refer to:

- Sparkler, a type of pyrotechnic device
- Sparkler (comics), a fictional character in the DC Universe
- Sparkler, a ride at Holiday World & Splashin' Safari
- Sparkler (Pillow Pal), a plush bear made by Ty, Inc.
- Sparkler (device), a showerhead-like device used in beer dispensing
- Sparklers (TV series), American cooking television series
- Sparkler (film), a 1997 film directed and co-written by Darren Stein
- Sparklers (software label), a budget software reissue label associated with the company Creative Sparks
- Sparkler, a distant galaxy gravitationally lensed by galaxy cluster SMACS J0723.3–7327

== See also ==
- Spark (disambiguation)
- Sparkling (disambiguation)
