= Burima Fireworks =

Indian fireworks manufacturer

Coordinates: 22.6301°N 88.3469°E

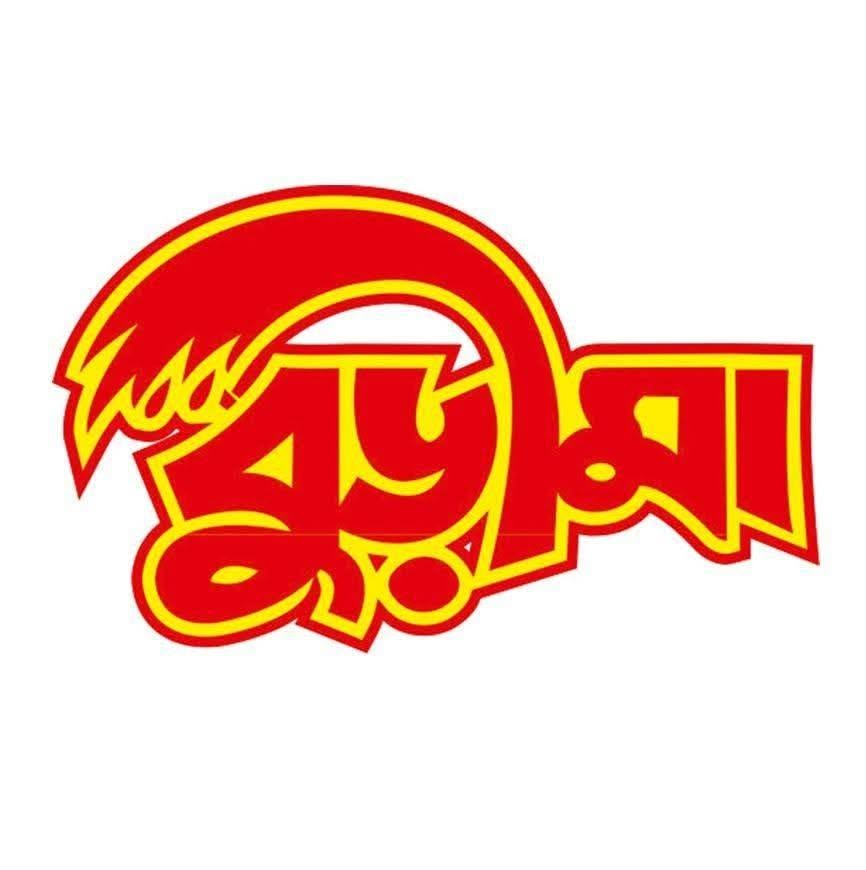
- Type: Privately held company
- Industry: Firecrackers, fireworks
- Founded: 1972 in Belur, West Bengal
- Founder: Annapurna Das
- Area served: West Bengal
- Key people: Sumit Das; Suman Das
- Products: Rang mashal; Kalipotka; Tara baji; Chocolate bomb

Burima Fireworks is an Indian brand that manufactures fireworks and firecrackers, centered at Belur in Howrah, West Bengal. It was founded by Annapurna Das, popularly known as "Burima" in 1972. The fireworks and firecrackers produced by the company are mainly used during Kali Puja in West Bengal. Burima Fireworks garnered popularity for being the most popular brand for supplying firecrackers during Kali Puja and other festivals primarily in West Bengal. By its early years, Burima Fireworks assembled various types of crackers that included chocolate bombs, kalipotkas, dodoma, tara bajis, sky shots and other fireworks which played a major role in the firecracker market.

Das moved into India following the India partition with her daughters and son. She later shifted into Belur with her son, where she sold stationery, followed by seasonal items like idols and colors. Learning the recipes of firecrackers and chocolate bombs, she sold her own hand-made crackers.

With gaining popularity for her products, she shifted to another place in Belur. Customers and children who came to Annapurna's shop called her as "Burima" for her grey hair, that she later named her business as. Eventually, a few factories were opened in Burima's name. Chocolate bomb production, was stopped in 1996. The brand opted for other demanded eco-friendly crackers. Burima is depicted on the crackers' boxes pictures as an elderly woman.

== History ==
=== 1947–1995 ===
The brand Burima Fireworks was founded by Annapurna Das, born in Faridpur in present-day Bangladesh. Following the Partition of India in 1947, she crossed the border and entered India with her two daughters (her eldest daughter had been married) and a son. She lost a huge portion of her wealth by the time she settled in India and managed to keep a small portion of her money. Das initially lived in a refugee camp at Gangarampur in West Dinajpur district with her family, where she would sell vegetables and pots for earnings buying them from artisans in 1948. Some time later, she sold bidis by learning to make them. In 1952−1953, she settled at 6, Shibchandra Chatterjee Lane in Belur with her son. Her two daughters were married by this time. In a small shop in her house, she sold stationery items. Later, Das opted for seasonal items. She started by purchasing Saraswati idols from potters far away from her locality and selling them at her shop, which later turned into aabir during Holi festival and crackers during Kali Puja which Das bought from Howrah. But her cracker selling business was halted by police because Annapurna did not have a fire safety license.

Das became interested in selling fireworks and crackers, for which she obtained a license. She initially started buying crackers from Bankra with Rs. 1000 and selling them at her market shop. Later, she learned to make crackers from sulfur, sora and gunpowder; and chocolate bombs from Akbar Ali, manufacturing and selling them the same year. Das also kept candies in her shop for children as it was located near a school. The children in her locality called her "Burima" because of her gray hair, from when she was popularly known by her sobriquet. Das's son branded her hand-made bombs as "Burima's chocolate bombs". She bought land for building a factory at Talbanda, which she later distributed as the cause of a charitable donation. Sometime later, Annapurna Das built fifty houses for fifty families who had no home, stating that "Business is insignificant, I have come here to love people."

After her products and brand gained popularity, she shifted to Peary Mohan Mukherjee Street in Belur. Das made her own hand-made chocolate bombs more instead of buying them. At this time, people who came to buy products at her stores also called her Burima. From that time she named her business as Burima Fireworks, which later developed into a brand. Two factories, one located in Madhyamgram and one in Dankuni, were set up under her brand's name. Another one was set up in Sivakasi in the Tamil Nadu state. Das built the factories in accordance to official regulations. Burima Fireworks became highly popular in the firecracker market. Annapurna Das's great-grandson Sumit Das commented "Chocolate bomb was banned and the factories had to be shut down. But the family started selling fireworks." The Burima Fireworks brand is managed at present by Sumit Das and his father Suman Das, who also stepped into selling eco-friendly (green) fireworks and film production. Burima (Annapurna Das) died on June 3, 1995.

=== 1996–present ===
Most types of firecrackers and chocolate bombs were permitted by law in West Bengal to be produced by Burima Fireworks till 1995. From 1996, the noise pollution limit for firecrackers were set at 90 decibels, which terminated the production of chocolate bombs because the bombs by Burima exceeded the limit. Bombs for Kali Puja were imported from other states in which the limit was higher. In 2023, the state government of West Bengal gave permission to manufacturers and increased the sound limit of firecrackers from 90 to 125 decibels. Das's family members stated that they would begin the production of chocolate bombs from 2024 if the state government gave them permission. During the year, eco-friendly fireworks were sold more by the company instead, including traditional crackers such as Rang mashal, Charki, Phuljhuri, Tubri, Tara baji and Drone fireworks in demand.

On October 19, 2019, West Bengal Pollution Control Board confiscated firecrackers weighing more than 4,000 kg from Burima's house located in Belur. Suman Das commented that they operated according to norms and did not know in what basis WBPCB took the crackers. An official from WBPCB said that the existing license allowed a small amount of crackers to be stored, but the stock was "far in excess". WBPCB stated the building to be used as an "illegal godown for crackers". In 2022, Burima Fireworks faced low demands from buyers and increase of prices in paper and cardboard, for which the firecrackers were sold at a higher market price.

In 2025, Sumit Das remarked about the company "Burima has an unique connection with the Bengalis. Burima's fireworks are used more in Bengali-dominated areas. This business started from the year 1972. I am the fourth-generation managing this business. This year, we have received positive feedback from the government. Even though this decision has been taken very late. Although from next year, we will be able to introduce new firecrackers in the market from the brand. We have a lot of fireworks that explode upon going in the sky, they create a lot more noise compared to the other firecrackers. Earlier, we were not able to sell those fireworks in the state. This year with the sound limit being 125 decibels, we will be able to sell those types of fireworks too. An improvement is being able to be seen in this business sector. If everyone else benefits from this matter, then we will improve too."

== Legacy and reception ==
The tiled house in which Annapurna Das lived after moving to Belur was preserved by local authorities. Barnini Maitra Chakraborty of The Telegraph wrote about Burima: "Burima lives on not only through her entrepreneurial venture but also the social work she did. She passed away in 1995 but the local residents fondly remember her. The kids who once frequented her shop for goodies have all grown old, but they clearly remember the smiling 'Burima'."

The cracker package box of the brand depicts a picture of an elderly Burima on it, which is a trademarked image. Sales of the Burima brand generally start around Viswakarma Puja and peak after Durga Puja. Bulk crackers and fireworks are bought by traders and dealers from the districts of Howrah, Hooghly, North 24 Parganas, South 24 Parganas and Kolkata. After Burima Fireworks' main product chocolate bomb had to be stopped, it introduced new color-changing crackers and rang mashals. In Bengal, the brand is competed by Sivasaki and other Chinese fireworks. The Telegraph wrote that the company has a cheaper price on its products compared to other companies such as Sivasaki. Sisir Kumar Dutta, a trader, stated a packet of three rang mashals to cost Rs. 250 in Sivasaki and a packet of 10 rang mashals to cost Rs. 160 in Burima. Various other traders issued statements on Burima Fireworks.

The demand for fireworks by Burima gradually increased after Das made her own firecrackers from raw materials. Firecrackers are sold by the company year-round, peaking after Durga Puja. Burima's home in Belur is visited by hundreds of people per day for buying crackers, which are sold between 9 AM and 9 PM. 12 members of Burima's family live in the house.
