= Sparkling (disambiguation) =

Sparkling is a characteristic of materials reflecting points of light. Sparkling may also refer to:

== Beverages ==
- Sparkling apple cider
- Sparkling water
- Sparkling wine

== Biology ==
- Sparkling enope squid, a squid species
- Sparkling gourami, a fish species
- Sparkling violetear, a hummingbird species

== See also ==
- Spark (disambiguation)
- Sparkle (disambiguation)
