= Picquot ware =

Obimus

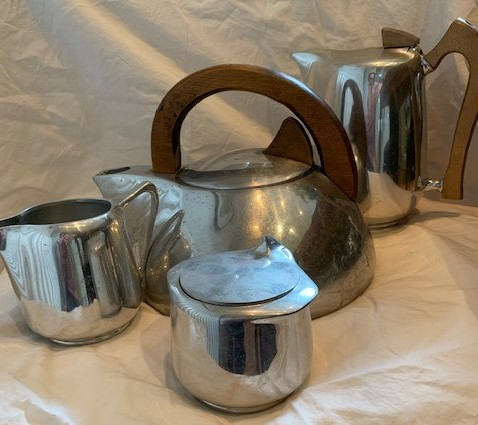
Picquot ware set including milk jug, sugar bowl with lid, kettle and coffee pot.

Picquot ware is mid-century designed, collectible tableware made of a magnesium-aluminium alloy that they named 'Magnalium' in production in the same Northampton factory (Burrage & Boyde) from 1947 until 1980. The factory also made vacuum cleaners.

The handles of the teapots, coffee pots and kettles are made of the wood of sycamore trees. The pieces are mostly cast as a single piece, and the solid construction is efficient at retaining heat.

The dome style K3 kettle was designed in 1938. It was chosen for the “Britain Can Make It” exhibition in London, which ran at the V&A for 14 weeks in the autumn of 1946.
