= Naoki Matayoshi =

Japanese comedian and novelist

- 又吉 直樹
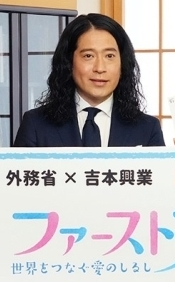
- March 2022
- Born: June 2, 1980 (age 46); Neyagawa, Osaka, Japan
- Employer: Yoshimoto Kogyo
- Notable work: Spark

Comedy career
- Years active: 2000–
- Medium: Television, novel
- Genres: conte, manzai

Notes
- Same year/generation as: Non Style; Heisei Nobushi Kobushi; Ryota Yamasato

Naoki Matayoshi (又吉 直樹, Matayoshi Naoki; born June 2, 1980) is a Japanese comedian, screenwriter, and novelist who won the Akutagawa Prize in 2015 for his book Hibana (火花, Spark), which was adapted into the Netflix series Hibana: Spark.

Matayoshi is the boke of his comedy duo Peace alongside his partner Yuji Ayabe. Ayabe left Japan for New York in 2016 to continue his comedic career overseas while Matayoshi stayed in Japan, effectively making the duo inactive since then.

He is from Neyagawa City in Osaka Prefecture. He graduated from Hokuyo Senior High School (presently Kansai University Hokuyo Senior High School).

== Filmography ==
=== Film ===
- The Great Passage (2013), Togawa
- From the End of the World (2023)
- 5 Centimeters per Second (2025), Shibata

=== Television ===
- The Untold Story: How Tezuka created his "Black Jack" (2013) – Fujio Akatsuka
- Botchan (2016) – Natsume Sōseki
- Segodon (2018) – Tokugawa Iesada
- Maiagare! (2022) – Iwao Yagi
- Unbound (2025) – Yadoya no Meshimori

== Bibliography ==
- Hibana (火花, Spark), Bungeishunjū, 2015, ISBN 9784163902302
- Yoru wo norikoeru (夜を乗り越える, Overcome the Night), Shogakukan, 2016, ISBN 9784098235018
- Gekijō (劇場, Theater), Shinchosha, 2017, ISBN 9784103509516
