= Sparklies =

Interference on analogue satellite television

Sparklies is a form of interference on analogue satellite television transmissions.

Sparklies are black or white 'hard' interference dots (as opposed to the 'soft' interference patterns of terrestrial television), caused either by too weak or too strong a signal. When within the satellite's rated reception footprint, sparklies are most likely to be caused by a misaligned dish, or LNBs which are too high- or too low-gain for the dish and receiver.

The term "sparklies" is used by British Sky Broadcasting (BSkyB) and a number of hardware makers including Amstrad and Pace.

Sparklies do not occur on digital satellite systems; similar problems with digital signals cause MPEG artifacts.

== See also ==
- Salt-and-pepper noise
- Sparkling
