= Sparkle (catamaran) =

Sparkle was a substantial catamaran designed by Angus Primrose, the designer of Gipsy Moth IV, to be sailed by an able bodied skipper and crewed by people of limited physical ability and mobility. It was based partially at Ravens Ait on the Thames at Surbiton in Surrey. It was designed to allow physically handicapped people the chance to sail a boat themselves

It featured a large open cockpit suitable for wheelchair access, with tether points for the crew to use. It was almost certainly the first purpose-built sailing boat for disabled sailors to use.

Sparkle was a major project in the 1970s of the SPARKS Charity.
