= Angus Primrose =

British yacht designer

- Born: Angus Primrose; April 1938 (age 87)
- Disappeared: October 1980 (age 42) believed to have drowned on the South Carolina coast

Angus Primrose (missing at sea, 1980) was a British designer and naval architect, whose best known designs for around the world races included Sir Francis Chichester's Gypsy Moth IV (with John Illingworth) and Galway Blazer II (1969) of Commander Bill King.

== Biography ==
Primrose is notable for his contribution to designs that changed some of the thinking behind cruising yachts. His Moody 33 (mk 1) centre cockpit design originated from his work in 1973 with A H Moody & Sons Ltd at Swanwick near Southampton. The boats were built in production by Marine Projects (Plymouth) Ltd, and led to the development of successive models: Moody 30, 36 and 39, all built at Plymouth. The custom Moody 42 was built by Moody's firm in Swanwick, with a centre cockpit and aft cockpit/deck saloon variants. In 1972 Angus Primrose designed the Warrior 35, built by Trident Marine Ltd. The long keel hull was also developed in various forms as the aft cockpit Challenger 35 and the deck saloon version the Voyager 35.

== Disappearance ==
Primrose is presumed to have drowned during a gale "some 180 miles off the South Carolina coast" which sunk his 33 ft yacht (a Moody 33), the Demon of Hamble.

== See also ==
- Commander Bill King
- Gypsy Moth IV
- List of people who disappeared mysteriously at sea
- Sparkle commissioned by the SPARKS Charity to take open up sailing for disabled people
