= Sparkling =

Visual phenomenon

Sparkling observed in 50-micron hollow glass particles in homogeneous isotropic turbulence

Bubbles create the sparkling effect in sparkling water

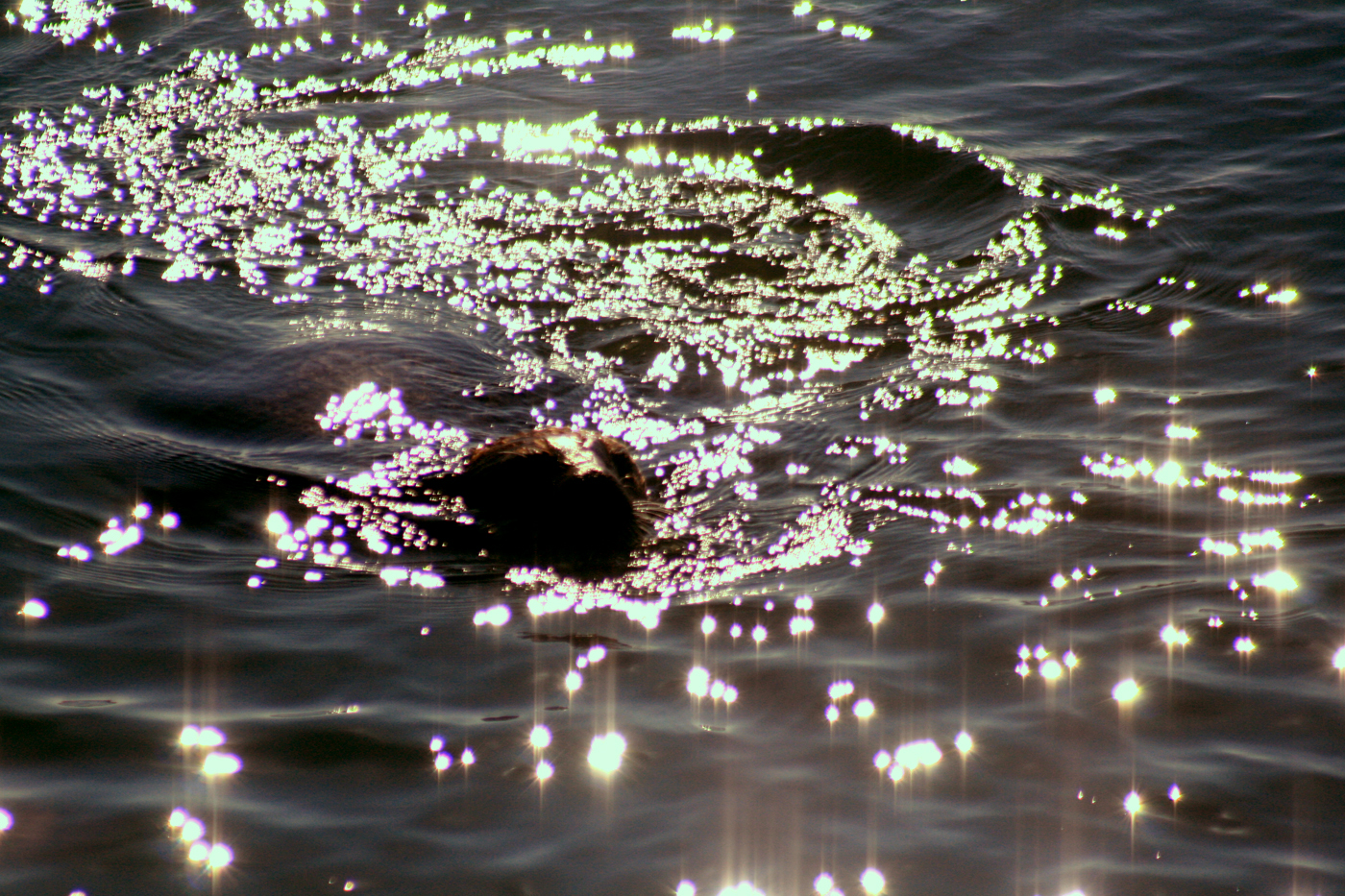
Sea otter surrounded by sun glitter, a natural form of sparkling

Sparkling is an optical phenomenon exhibited by materials, both solids and liquids, in which numerous points of light appear and disappear, or change in brightness as the material, observer, or light source moves, creating an impression of brilliance and visual movement. In many materials, this effect results from specular reflection by small reflective particles, facets, or flakes that direct incident light toward the observer, although sparkling can also result from refraction and other optical phenomena.

== Physical mechanisms ==
Sparkling is a visual texture rather than the result of a single optical process, characterized by localized points of high luminance that contrast strongly with their immediate surroundings and become more apparent as the material, observer, or light source moves. A common cause is specular reflection from a surface containing many small reflective facets or particles having slightly different orientations. Under directional illumination, only those facets whose orientation directs reflected light toward the observer appear intensely bright at a given moment; movement of the object, observer, or light source changes which facets satisfy this condition, causing individual bright points to appear, disappear, or change in intensity.

Directional illumination consequently tends to enhance sparkling, as in coatings containing reflective flakes, which can respond to unidirectional illumination by producing isolated luminous spots on a comparatively dark background, while increasingly diffuse illumination causes the same underlying particle distribution to appear more uniformly granular, an effect also known as graininess. The visibility of a given sparkle depends on factors including the reflectivity, size and orientation of the reflecting particle, the brightness and distance of the light source, and the properties of the surrounding material. Under suitable conditions, reflective flakes only a few micrometres across, or even about one micrometre across, can generate a visible sparkle although the individual particles cannot themselves be spatially resolved by the eye.

In materials containing effect pigments, sparkling can arise when individual pigment particles act as small specular reflectors, producing bright points only when they are suitably oriented relative to the relevant light source and the observer. The effect is, therefore, enhanced by directional illumination, and varies with viewing geometry, since movement changes which particles are directing reflected light toward the observer. Larger reflective particles can also produce more conspicuous sparkling, as they reflect greater amounts of light.

Sparkling is related to iridescence, but the two phenomena are distinct. Iridescence is an angle-dependent change in hue, which is produced when the color observed from a surface varies with the angle of observation or illumination, often because optical structures selectively reinforce different wavelengths as the viewing geometry changes. Sparkling instead concerns the spatial and temporal appearance of discrete bright points. A material can exhibit both phenomena simultaneously. Ordered colloidal photonic crystals, for example, have been experimentally shown to produce strongly iridescent, sparkling color patterns through constructive interference of reflected light. Similarly, effect pigments and pearlescent materials may combine specular reflection and interference so that individual flakes produce colored flashes whose brightness or hue changes with orientation.

=== Sparkling in liquids ===
Carbonated beverages are often marketed as "sparkling", such as sparkling water and sparkling wine. In beverages, sparkling is often associated with effervescence, the escape of gas from an aqueous solution and the foaming or fizzing that results from that release. The dissolved gas escapes from solution and forms bubbles that rise through the liquid and burst at its surface. These bubbles also interact optically with their surroundings because of the difference in refractive index between the gas and liquid. Light reaching a bubble may be reflected or refracted at its surface, producing angle-dependent highlights that move and change in brightness.

A natural example of sparkling on liquid surfaces is sun glitter, formed when sunlight reflects from water waves. The waves may be caused by natural movement of the water, or by the movement of birds or animals in the water. Even a ripple from a thrown rock will create a momentary glitter. Light reflects from smooth surfaces by specular reflection. A rippled but locally smooth surface such as water with waves will reflect the sun at different angles at each point on the surface of the waves. As a result, a viewer in the right position will see many small images of the sun, formed by portions of waves that are oriented correctly to reflect the sun's light to the viewer's eyes. The exact pattern seen depends on the viewer's precise location. The color and the length of the glitter depend on the altitude of the Sun. The lower the sun appears, the longer and more reddish the glitter is. When the sun is really low above the horizon, the glitter breaks because of the waves, which could sometimes obstruct the sun and cast a shadow on the glitter.

Sun glitter is observed on other planetary bodies with surface liquids, namely Titan. Titan hosts lakes and seas of liquid methane at its north polar region. Sun glitter was discovered on Titan's smallest sea, Punga Mare, in 2014 as a set of brightened pixels at infrared wavelengths across Punga Mare's bright sea surface. The glitter was likely caused by springtime winds. Sun glitter has also been observed in the largest sea, Kraken Mare, during the northern summer. Tidal currents in narrow straits and summer winds were the probable causes of the Kraken sun glitter.

=== Visual perception of sparkling ===
Whether a physical reflection is actually perceived as sparkling depends on the response of the visual system, particularly the contrast between the luminous point and its background. Experiments on human vision have shown that the threshold for detecting a small luminous target varies with the luminance of both the target and its background, as well as with target size and viewing conditions. Ferrero and colleagues therefore defined the visibility of sparkle in terms of the contrast threshold of human vision rather than simply the physical brightness of a reflecting particle.

For very small luminous targets, perception follows Ricco's law. Within a sufficiently small receptive field of the retina, the visual system effectively sums the light received across the field; consequently, an unresolved point may still be detected if the total light delivered to that field is sufficient to exceed the visual threshold. Perceiving a sparkle therefore does not require that the eye resolve the shape of the reflecting particle. A microscopic reflector can instead be perceived as a luminous point that is unresolved against its surrounding background. Movement changing the amount of light directed toward the eye can then cause individual reflections to repeatedly cross above and below the contrast threshold, creating the characteristic impression of sparkles switching on and off. Sparkle-visibility measures based on those properties of human vision closely correlate with observer visual assessments of sparkling materials.

Sparkling can also be perceived by machine vision, which can therefore be exploited against it. For example, the use of sparkling eye shadow can confuse eye-tracking devices.

== Cultural significance ==
Culturally and in fictional works, sparkling is often associated with depictions of magic, and with mystical creatures like fairies. This usage is particularly conspicuous in media directed towards children, and female-centered fantasy media. Media scholar Mary Celeste Kearney identifies Disney's Cinderella as an influential example of sparkling effects accompanying the Fairy Godmother's transformation of Cinderella and her clothing, and notes that Disney has subsequently consistently used such effects in girl-centered animation. Sparkling is typically associated with fairies and "good" witches, to represent their exercise of supernatural power.

The use of sparkling light to signify magic in this way occurs as early as the original 1904 stage production of Peter Pan, in which the fairy Tinker Bell, was represented on stage by a darting light "created by a small mirror held in the hand off-stage and reflecting a little circle of light from a powerful lamp". Film scholar Murray Pomerance describes the character as an embodiment of electrical illumination as magical power, with continuous movement and luminosity underscoring Tinker Bell's supernatural nature. The visual device of "pixie dust" became strongly associated with Tinker Bell's magic and with fairies and pixies more generally, and illustrating this as a sparkling substance became a staple of Disney animation.

Kearney identifies Disney's Cinderella as an influential example of sparkling effects accompanying a magical transformation, there occurring when the Fairy Godmother transforms Cinderella and her clothing. This convention is parodied in Wreck-It Ralph, where Vanellope von Schweetz is restored to her original status as a princess, with sparkling effects surrounding her transformation, prompting her to ask, "What's with all the magic sparkles?" Disney Animation supervisor Marlon West described the sequence as an overt callback to Cinderella's transformation, placing the pixie-dust effect in the latter film's video-game setting.

Kearney notes that sparkling in popular culture has become gender-coded, writing:

The sparklefication of late modern life in the United States is excessive not only in amount. It is overwhelmingly raced, classed, gendered and aged, with white middle-class female youth its primary targets and proponents. Indeed, sparkle is so ubiquitous in mainstream girls culture -- and so absent in boys' -- it vies with pink as the primary signifier of youthful femininity.

The gendered appeal of sparkling is evident in the Twilight vampire novel series, where one characteristic of male vampires, most notably Edward Cullen, that is enticing to female observers is that rather than being harmed by sunlight, it makes their skin sparkle. Author Stephenie Meyer stated that the first novel originated in a dream involving an ordinary girl and a "fantastically beautiful, sparkly" vampire who were falling in love, with Edward's sparkling appearance being present from the conception of the character as a beautiful romantic figure, rather than a more traditional frightening and malicious vampire. Kaja Franck contrasts earlier literary vampires with this "sparkling attraction", arguing that this shift of the narrative viewpoint toward Bella's desire paints Edward as an object of the female gaze. Depiction of Edward in the films as sparkling with shimmering light under sunlight has similarly been noted as aligning the viewer with Bella's admiring gaze.

== See also ==
- Glitter
- Spark (fire)
- Sparkler
- Sparklies
