= Chocolate bomb =

Type of firework

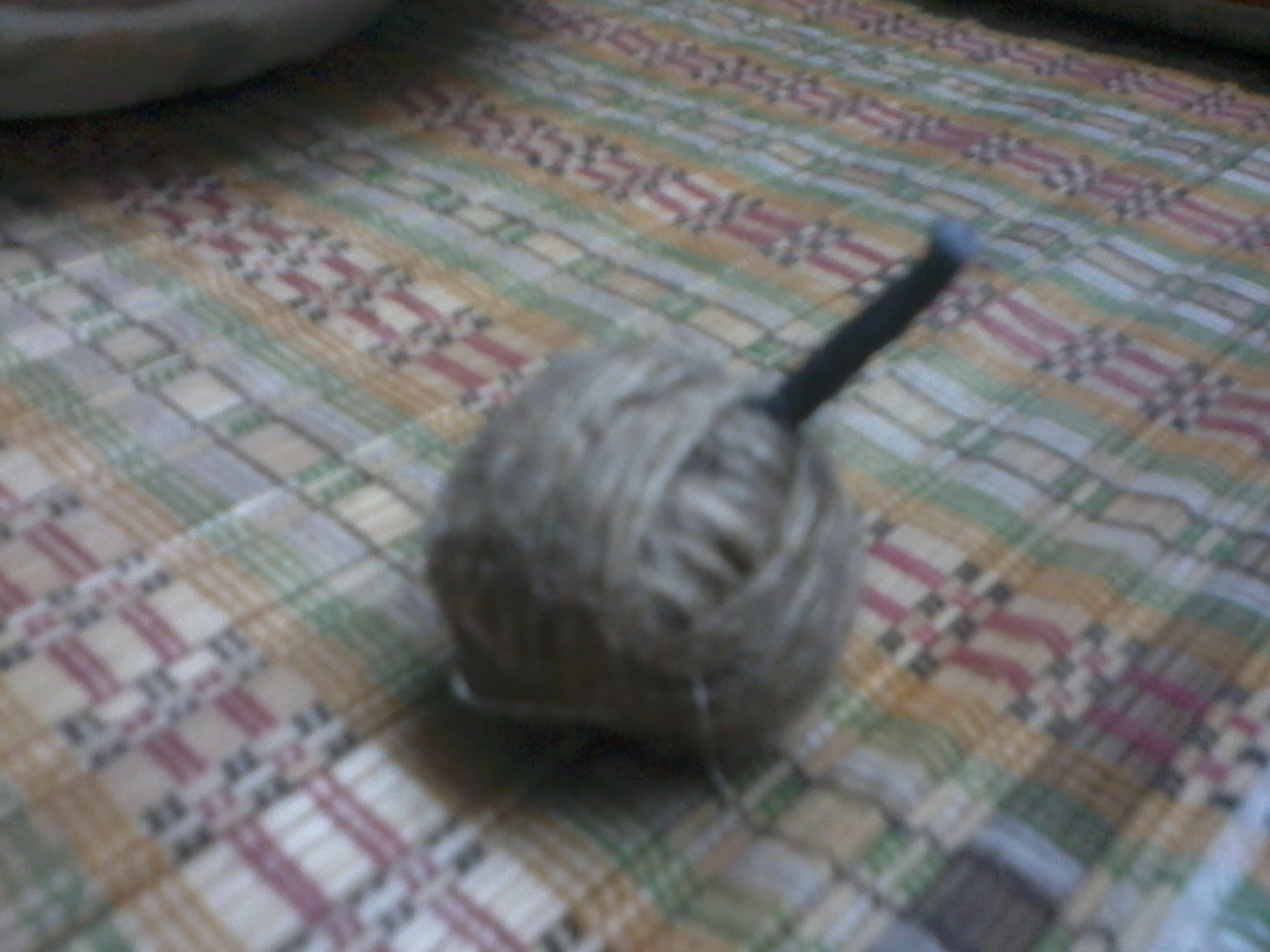
A chocolate bomb-style firecracker. The black protrusion is the fuse, which is ignited.

A chocolate bomb (Hindi: सुतरी बम) is a firecracker which is exploded by revelers during Diwali and New Year's Eve celebrations in India. Chocolate bombs are made of tiny paperboard boxes stuffed with gunpowder. A fuse is inserted in one of the corners. The boxes are then tightly wrapped with jute strings and dried in the sun for three days. After that they are wrapped with colorful aluminum foil, making them resemble chocolates. The Burima brand of chocolate bombs were very popular in Kolkata in the 1990s. The firecracker has been declared illegal in West Bengal.

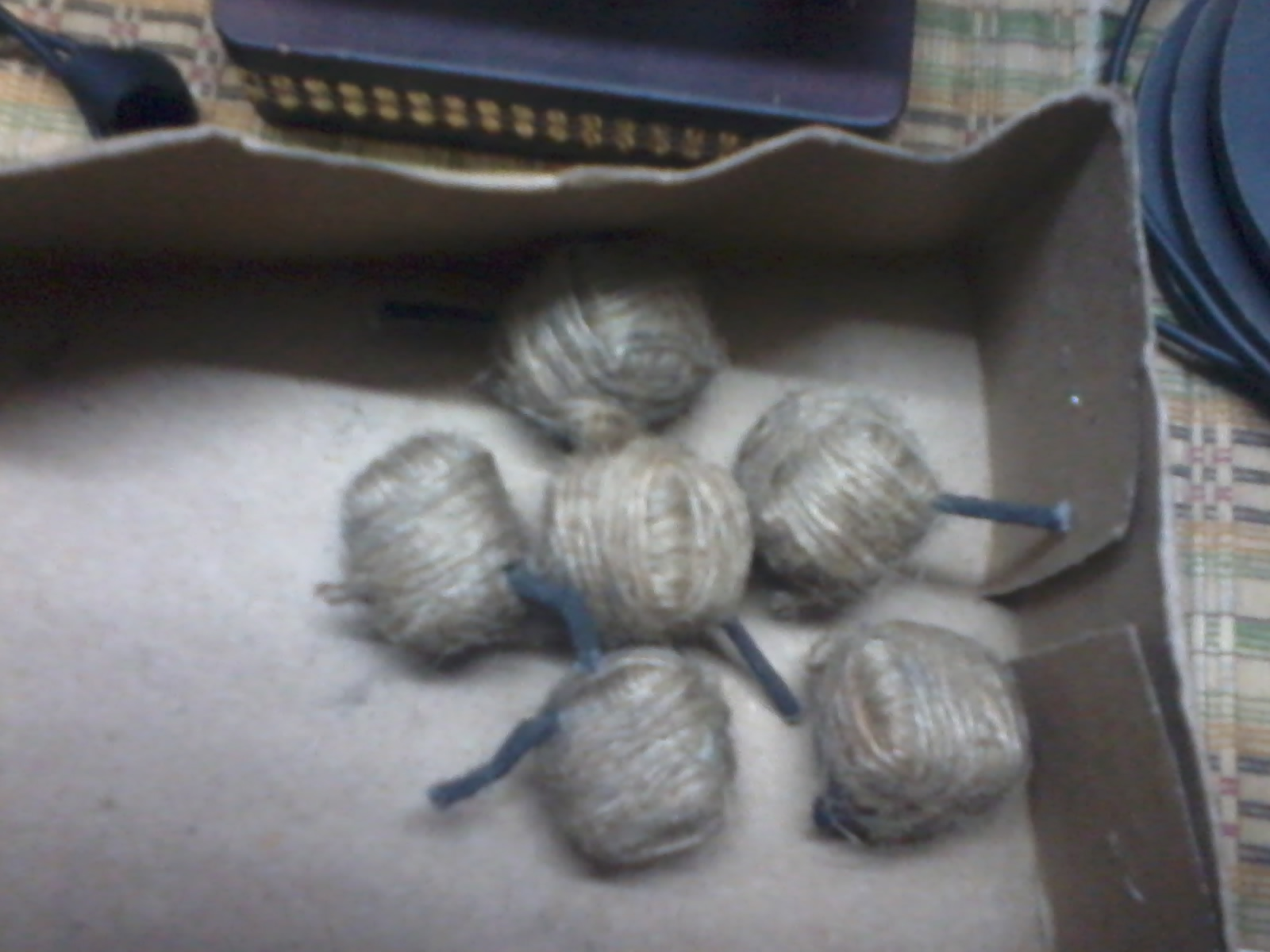
A few chocolate bombs in a box
