= Sparx =

Sparx may refer to:

== Companies and brands ==
- Sparx* Studios, a French-Vietnamese CGI animation studio
- Sparx Systems, an Australian software company
- Sparx, an Indian footwear brand produced by Relaxo

== Arts and entertainment ==
- Sparx (American band), a Latin-music band from New Mexico
- Sparx (Indonesian band), a band formed by the top five winners of the first season of Popstars Indonesia
- Sparx (musician), Iain James, British singer and producer
- Sparx (video game), a free online computer game
- Sparx (character), a DC Comics superheroine
- Sparx (Ace Lightning), a character from Ace Lightning
- Sparx, a character from Super Robot Monkey Team Hyperforce Go!
- Sparx the Dragonfly, a character from the Spyro video game series
- Lineysha Sparx, Puerto Rican drag queen

== See also ==
- Sparks (disambiguation)
- Spark (disambiguation)
