= Sparks, West Virginia =

Coordinates: 38.2356653°N 80.9025988°W

Sparks is a ghost town in Nicholas County, in the U.S. state of West Virginia.

== History ==
A post office called Sparks was established in 1907, and remained in operation until 1959. The community was named after Joseph Sparks, a local merchant.
