= Spark (fire) =

Incandescent particle

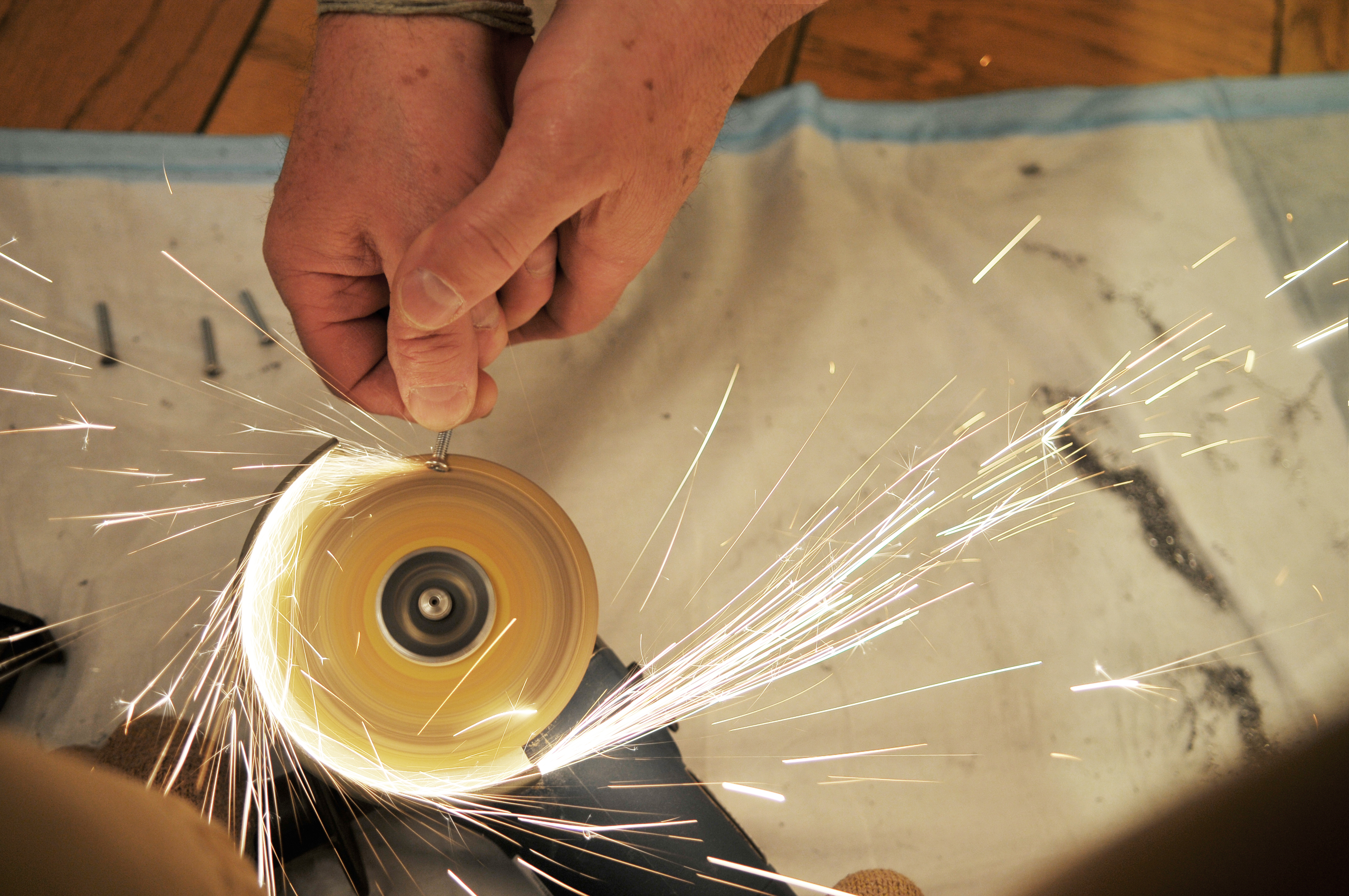
Sparks from a screw held on a grinder

Sparks while cutting a roof in Tokyo, Japan

A spark is an incandescent particle. Sparks may be produced by pyrotechnics, by metalworking or as a by-product of fires, especially when burning wood.

== Pyrotechnics ==
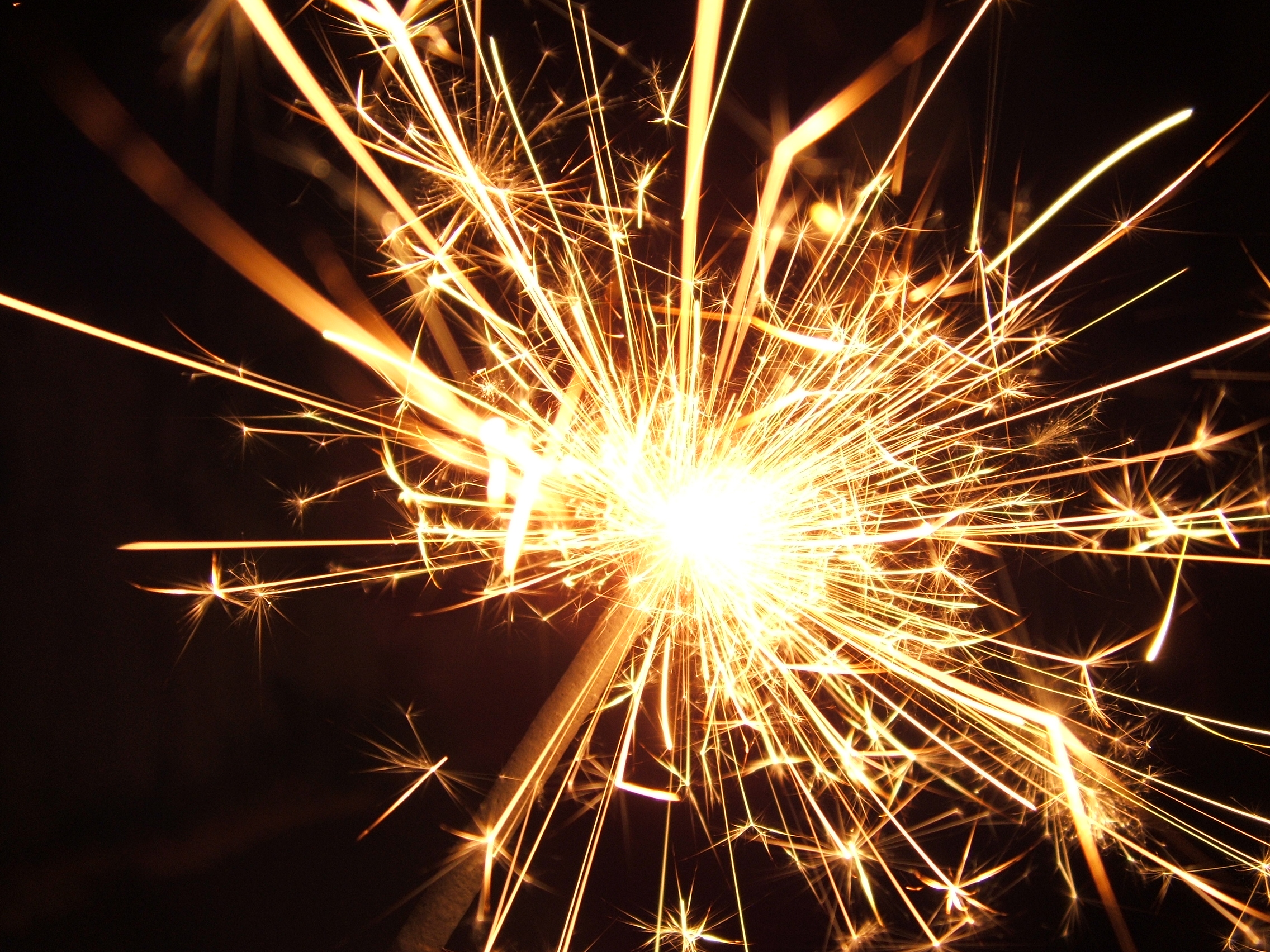
Sparks from a pyrotechnic sparkler.

In pyrotechnics, charcoal, iron filings, aluminum, titanium and metal alloys such as magnalium may be used to create sparks. The quantity and style of sparks produced depends on the composition and pyrophoricity of the metal and can be used to identify the type of metal by spark testing. In the case of iron, the presence of carbon is required, as in carbon steel — about 0.7% is best for large sparks. The carbon burns explosively in the hot iron and this produces pretty, branching sparks. The color of sparks used in pyrotechnics is determined by the material that the sparks are made from, with the possibility of adding different chemical compounds to certain materials to further influence the color of the sparks. The basic color of sparks is limited to red/orange, gold (yellow) and silver (white). This is explained by light emission from a solid particle. Light emitted from solid particles is defined by black-body radiation. The temperature of the spark is controlled by the reactivity of the metal. Higher reactive metals lead to hotter sparks. The electronegativity has found to be a helpful indicator to estimate the temperature and consequently the color of a spark. To achieve colors differing from black body emitters, vapor phase combustion of the metal is necessary. A typical example is zinc, with a relatively low boiling point of 1,180 K (910 °C; 1,660 °F). Zinc sparks show an unusual bluish/greenish white appearance. Exotic sparks can be obtained from erbium powder. These sparks switch between surface and vapor phase combustion and accordingly between orange (black body) and green (element specific) emission. The color-change is based on the medium-ranged boiling point of erbium, which burns only partly in the vapor phase.

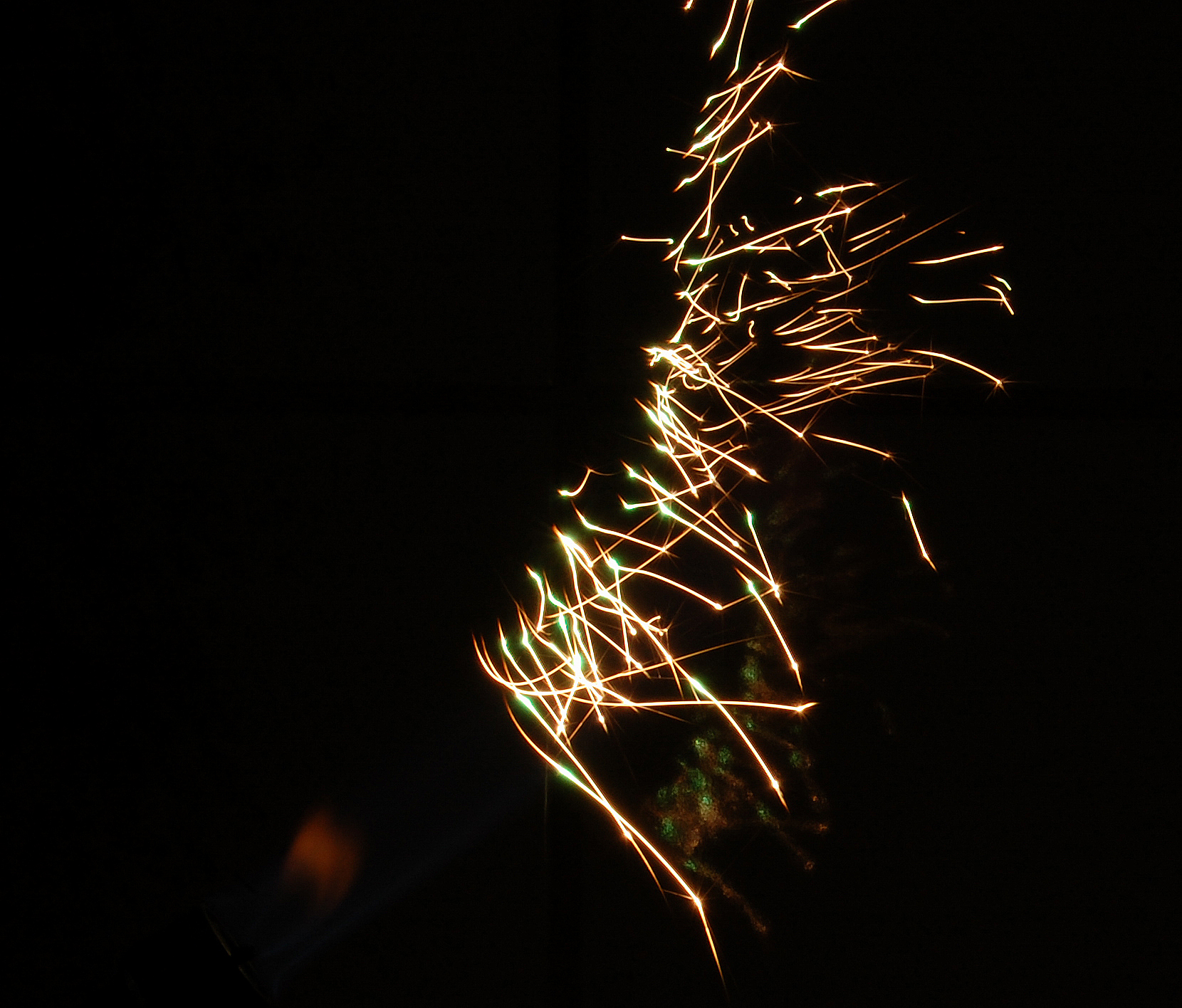
Color-changing sparks from erbium powder with golden and green spark phases.

The adjacent rare earth elements thulium, lutetium and yttrium can form color-changing sparks, too, although the visibility of both phases of the same spark is less pronounced due to a lower (Tm) or higher (Y, Lu) boiling point of the metal. Alloys containing at least one metal with a low boiling point can be used to control the color of the spark. The lower boiling component evaporates and burns in the vapor phase, while the metal with a high boiling point serves as a carrier. In the vapor phase, bright element-specific light emission takes place. For example, a eutectic ytterbium-copper-alloy forms long green sparks and burning lithium silicide shows long red spark segments. The duration of a spark’s existence is determined by the initial size of the particle, with a larger size leading to a longer-lasting spark.

Metals with low thermal conductivity are especially good at producing sparks. Titanium and zirconium are especially good in this respect and so are now used in fireworks. Copper, on the other hand, has a high conductivity and so is poor at producing sparks. For this reason, alloys of copper such as beryllium bronze are used to make safety tools which will not spark so easily.

== Flint and steel ==
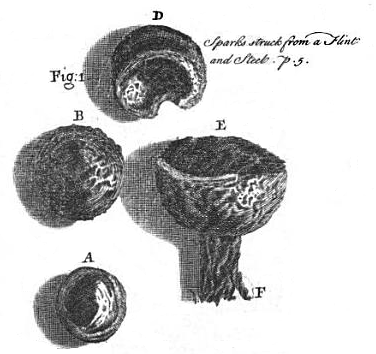
The cold remnants of steel sparks struck by Robert Hooke using a flint. These were collected on paper, studied using his early microscope and drawn by hand.

Robert Hooke studied the sparks created by striking a flint and steel together. He found that the sparks were usually particles of the steel that had become red hot and so melted into globules. These sparks can be used to ignite tinder and so start a fire.

In colonial America, flint and steel were used to light fires when easier methods failed. Scorched linen was commonly used as tinder to catch the spark and start the fire, but producing a good spark could take much time. A spinning steel wheel provided a good stream of sparks when it engaged the flint, and a tinderbox designed to do this was known as a mill.

In a modern lighter or firesteel, iron is mixed with cerium and other rare earths to form the alloy ferrocerium. This readily produces sparks when scraped and burns hotter than steel would. This higher temperature is needed to ignite the vapour of the lighter fluid.

== Metal working ==
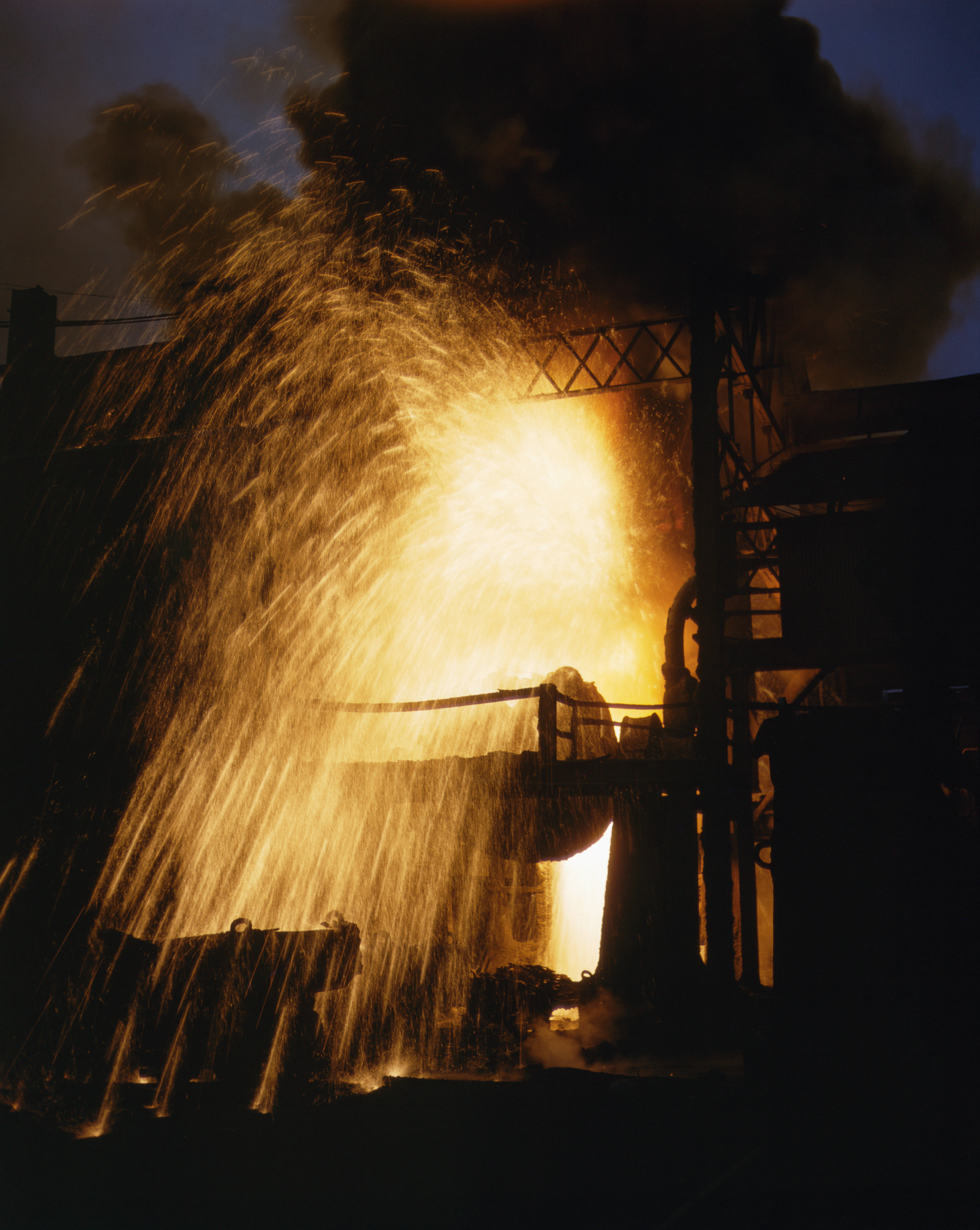
Spray of sparks from a Bessemer converter as air is blown through the molten metal

Molten metal sparks can be created when metal is heated by processes such as Bessemer conversion of iron to steel or arc welding.

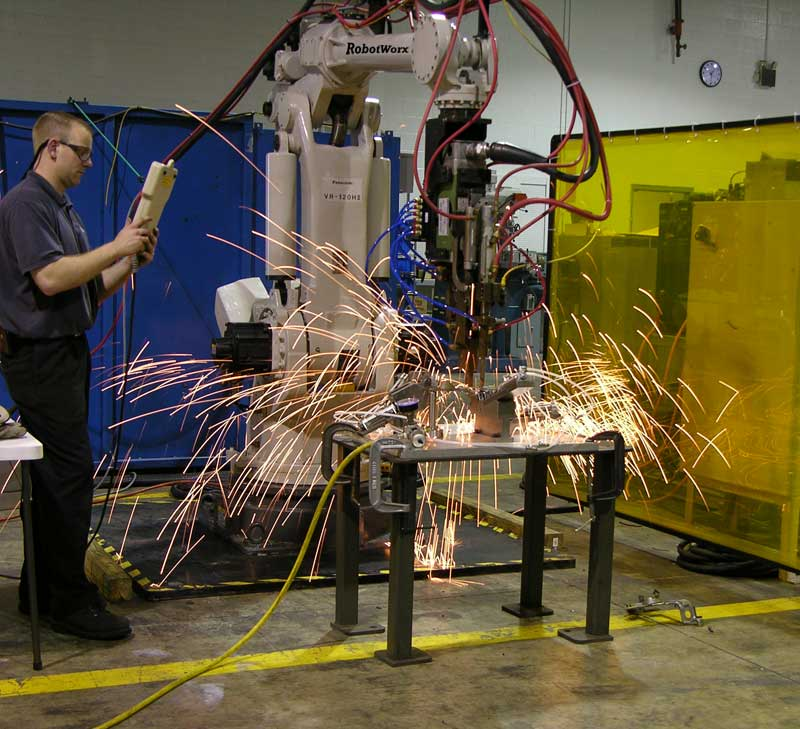
Sparks from spot welding robot

Arc welding uses a low voltage and high current electric arc between an electrode and the base material to melt the metals at the welding point, which often creates sparks. To reduce the risk of burns, welders wear heavy leather gloves and long sleeve jackets to avoid exposure to extreme heat, flames, and sparks. In spot welding, metal surfaces that are held in contact are joined by the heat from resistance to electric current flow. It is common for a spray of sparks in the form of molten metal droplets to be ejected from the parts being joined. or the resistance heating of spot welding.

== Fires and spark arrestors ==
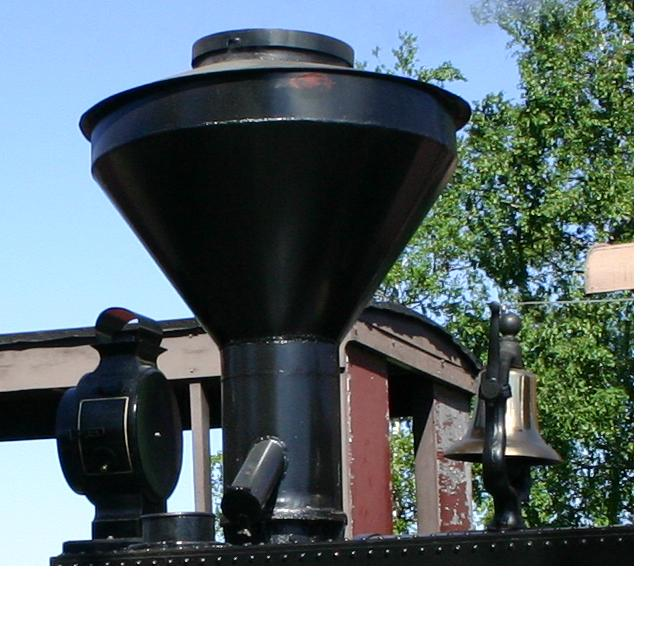
A spark-arresting chimney on a locomotive

Fires may produce sparks as updrafts carry particles of the burning fuel aloft. This was a great problem with steam locomotives as the sparks might set fire to the adjacent landscape or even to the train itself, especially if the engine burned wood rather than coal. To prevent this dangerous nuisance, a variety of spark arrestors were invented and fitted.

The chimneys and exhausts of other fuel-burning engines such as steam engines or internal combustion engines might also have spark arrestors fitted if there would be a fire risk from their operation. For example, a trail bike might be fitted with a centrifugal arrestor, which will trap glowing hot pieces of soot.

== Symbolism ==
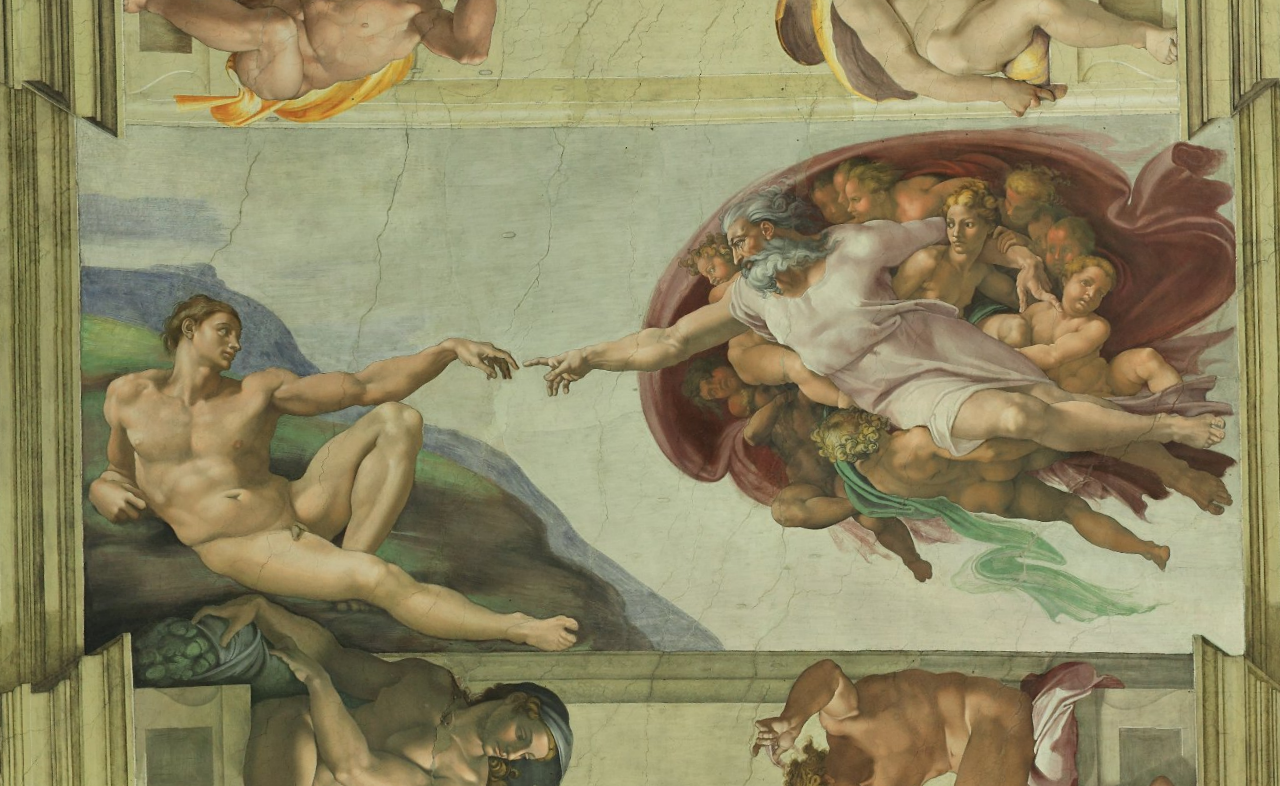
The Creation of Adam by Michelangelo in which the spark of life is passed

The significance of a spark as a source for a flame or a conflagration shows clearly, for example, in the naming and motto of Lenin's newspaper Iskra [The Spark]. The spark metaphor has often been used in philosophy since Stoicism and, recently, after Jacques Lacan. The “creative spark” has come to be considered as inherent to metaphor itself. Hasidic philosophy contains a doctrine of holy sparks (nitzotzot) from the kabbalism of Isaac Luria in which there is a duty to gather the sundered light of creation.

In the Book of Job (Job 5:7), it is written, "Yet man is born unto trouble, as the sparks fly upward." The use by King James' translators of the word sparks here is a poetic one rather than a literal one. The sparks of fire are identified by some translators as the sons of Resheph - a Canaanite deity of lightning and pestilence.

== See also ==
- Electric arc
- Lightning
- Short circuit
- Ember
- Sparkling
