= Sparkler =

Hand-held firework burning with sparks

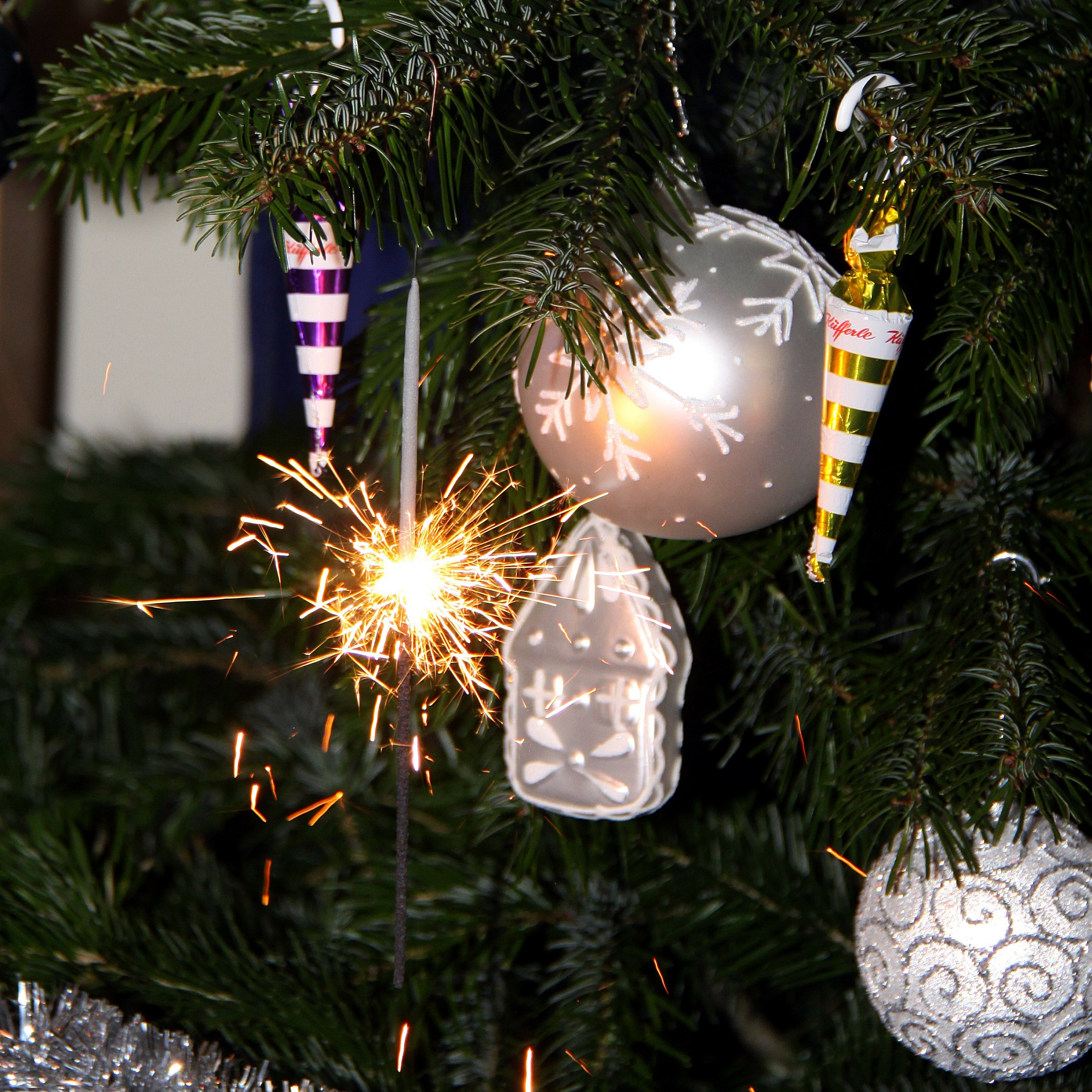
A sparkler on a Christmas tree

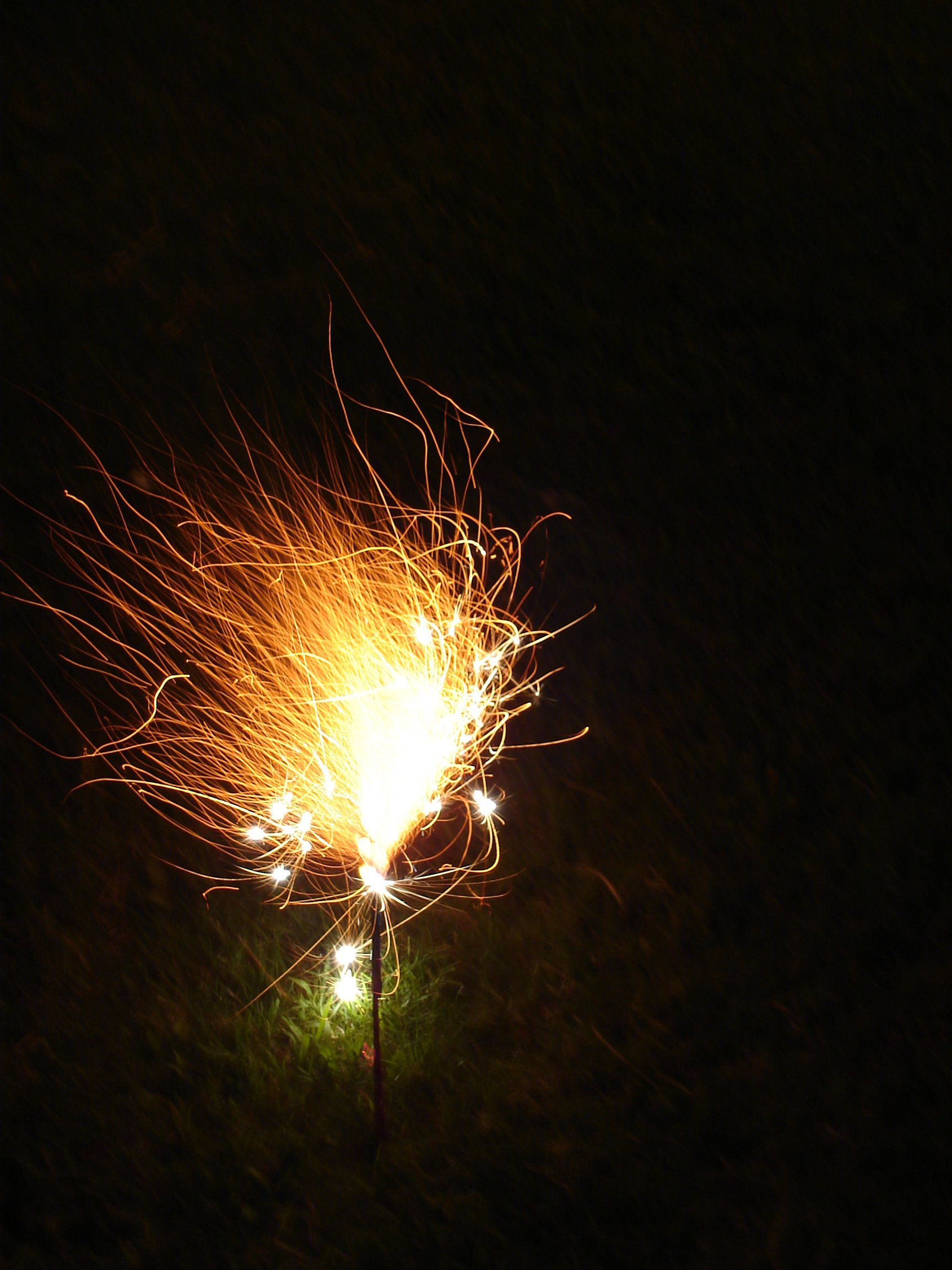
A "Morning Glory" type sparkler, emitting small pyrotechnic stars during this phase of the burn

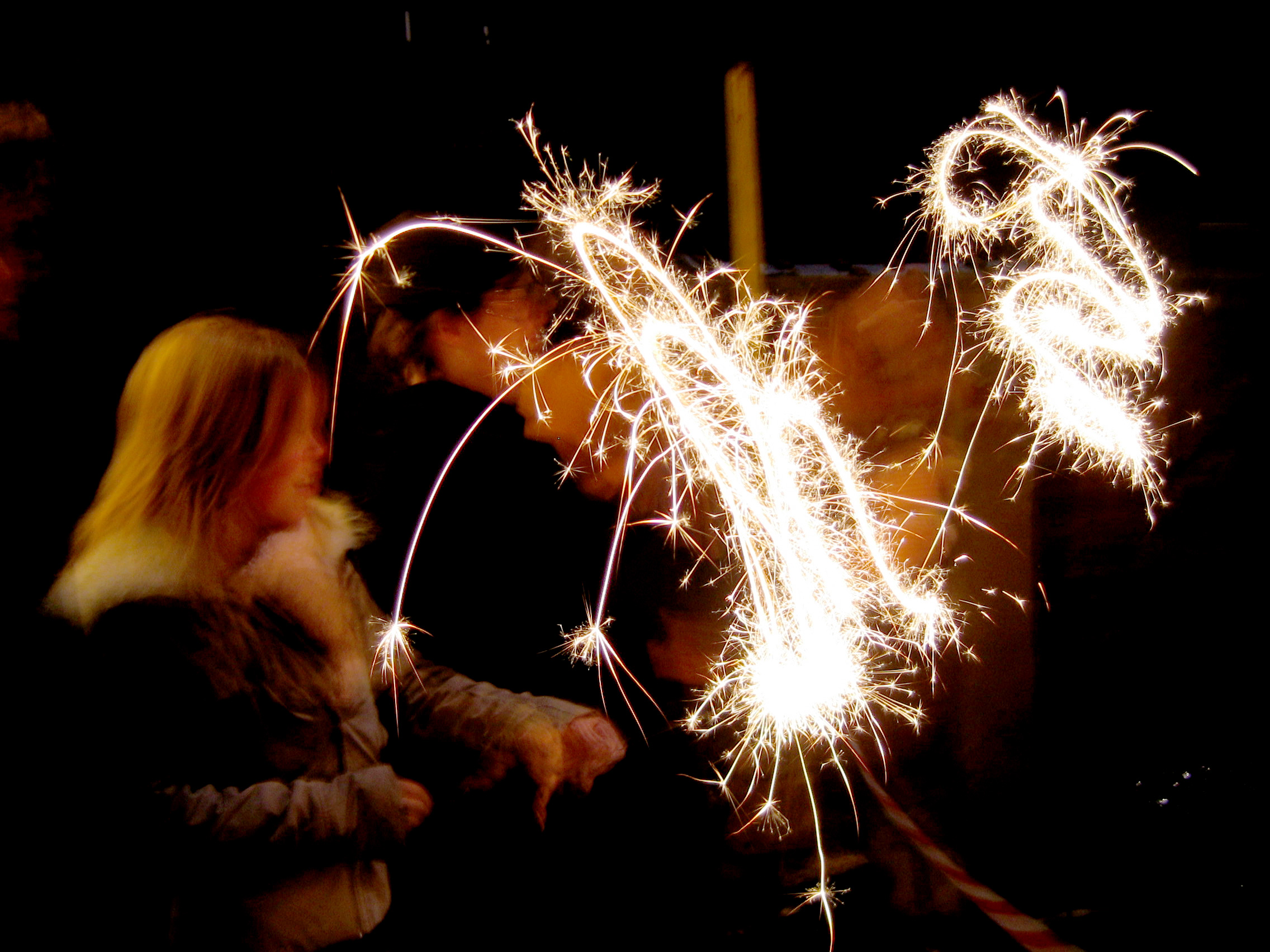
Sparklers are popular fireworks for children.

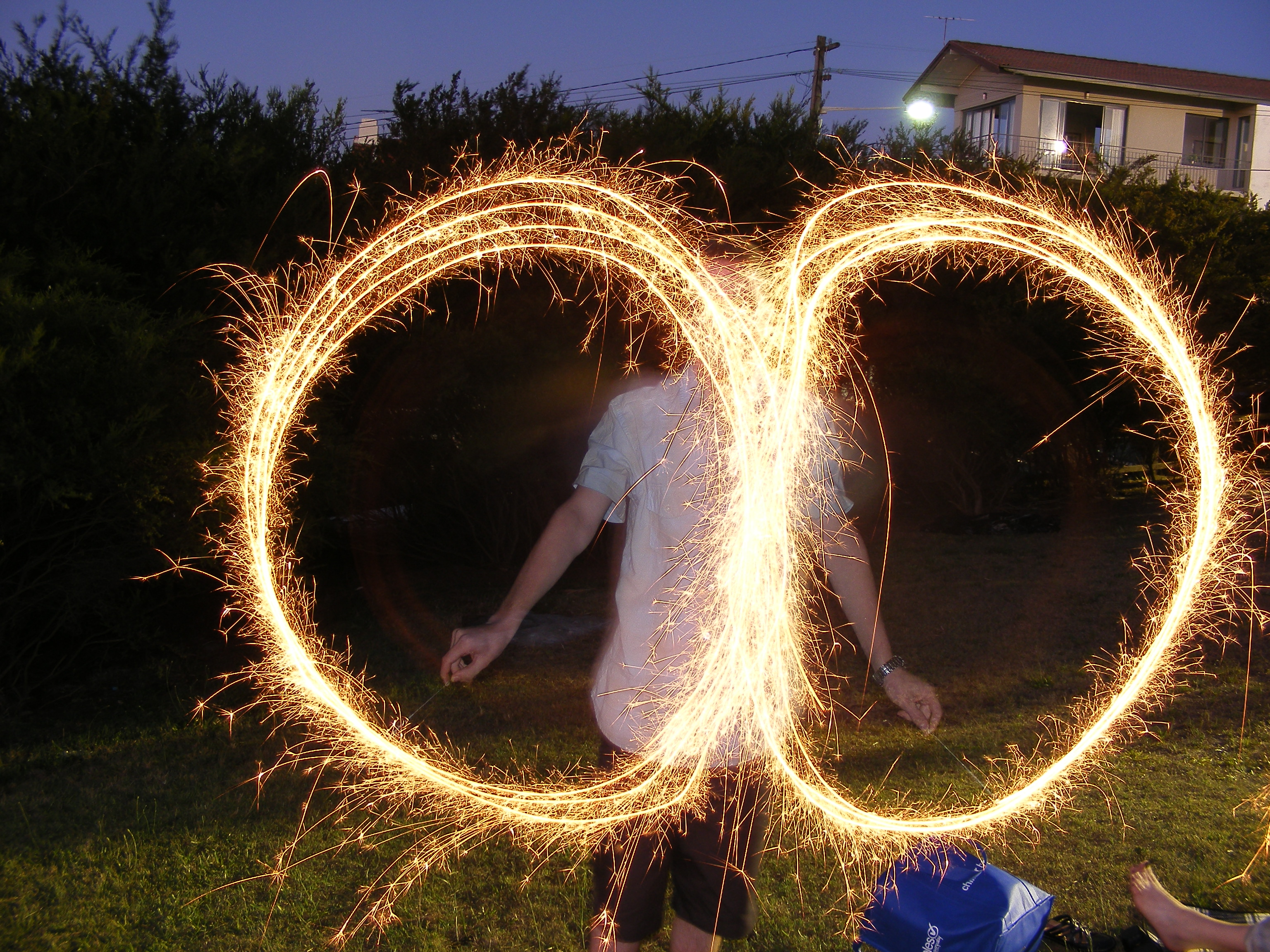
Moving sparklers quickly can create attractive patterns.

A sparkler is a type of hand-held firework that burns slowly while emitting bright, colored sparks. It burns at a high temperature (over 1,000 °C (1,830 °F)), so it can be very dangerous.

Sparklers are particularly popular with children. In the United Kingdom, a sparkler is often used by children at bonfire and fireworks displays on Guy Fawkes Night, the fifth of November, and in the United States on Independence Day. They are called phuljhadi in Hindi – hence "Bengali" torches, candles, etc. – and are especially popular during the Diwali festival.

== Composition ==
Sparklers are generally formed around a thin non-combustible metallic wire, about 8–12 inches (20–30 cm) long, that has been dipped in a thick batter of slow-burning pyrotechnic composition and allowed to dry. The combustible coating contains the following components; multiple ingredients can be used:

- Metallic fuel, main reactive ingredient; the type of metal influences the color of sparks; particle size influences the shape and size of the sparks
  - Aluminium, magnesium or magnalium, for white sparks
  - Iron, for orange branching sparks
  - Titanium, for rich white sparks
  - Ferrotitanium, for yellow-gold sparks
- Oxidizer, main reactive ingredient
  - Potassium nitrate
  - Barium nitrate
  - Strontium nitrate
  - Potassium perchlorate, more powerful but potentially explosive
  - Ammonium perchlorate
- Combustible binder, to hold the composition together
  - Dextrin
  - Nitrocellulose
- Additional fuel (optional), to modify the burning speed
  - Sulfur
  - Charcoal
- Pyrotechnic colorants (optional), to color the sparks
  - chlorides and nitrates of metals, e.g. barium, strontium, or copper

The colored spot on the top of each rod indicates the color of the sparkles emitted when ignited.

== Uses ==
Sparklers are usually used for celebrations. They can be used for light painting. Due to the high (over 1000°C) burning temperature of certain compositions, they can also be used to ignite thermite.

== Fountain candles ==
Fountain candles are variants of the traditional sparklers. Instead of being coated onto a wire, the chemicals are packed into a cardboard tube. Those small tubes filled with chemicals that when ignited spew out a plume of glowing sparks into the air. The effect can last a few seconds (cake fountain candles), up to a minute (bottle fountain sparklers) or several minutes (special effects for stage shows and concerts). These devices all consist of some combustible materials packed into a cardboard tube with the length of the visual effect being determined by the amount and specific composition of the chemicals packed into the tube

Press reports have stated that fountain candles are believed to have been the cause of the 2026 Crans-Montana bar fire.

Also known as Bengal lights, Bengal candles or Bengal fountains, they are different from Bengal fire, a form of outdoor firework.

== Safety issues ==
A 2009 report from the National Council on Fireworks Safety indicated that sparklers are responsible for 16 percent of legal firework-related injuries in the United States. The U.S. Consumer Product Safety Commission's statistics from the Fourth of July festivities in 2003 indicate that sparklers were involved in a majority (57%) of fireworks injuries sustained by children under five years of age.

Subsequent reports from the U.S. Consumer Product Safety Commission about "Fireworks-Related Deaths, Emergency Department-Treated Injuries, and Enforcement Activities" indicate:

| Year | Estimated injuries | % Estimated sparklers-related injuries | |
| Year | Estimated injuries | On all fireworks- related injuries | For children under 5 years old |
|---|---|---|---|
| 2011 | 1100 | 17% | 36% |
| 2012 | 600 | 12% | 30% |
| 2013 | 2300 | 31% | 79% |
| 2014 | 1400 | 19% | 61% |

The devices burn at a high temperature (as hot as 1000°C to 1600°C, or 1800°F to 3000°F), depending on the fuel and oxidizer used, more than sufficient to cause severe skin burns or ignite clothing. Safety experts recommend that adults ensure children who handle sparklers be properly warned, supervised and wearing non-flammable clothing.

As with all fireworks, sparklers are also capable of accidentally initiating wildfires. That is especially true in drier areas; in Australia, for instance, sparkler-related bushfire accidents have led to their banning at public outdoor events during summer, such as at Australia Day celebrations.

Sparkler bombs are home-made devices constructed by binding together as many as 300 sparklers with tape, leaving one extended to use as a fuse. In 2008, three deaths were attributed to the devices, which can be ignited accidentally by heat or friction. Since they usually contain more than 50 milligrams of the same explosive powder found in firecrackers, they are illegal in the U.S. under Bureau of Alcohol, Tobacco, Firearms and Explosives (ATF) regulations.

Sparklers in Tokyo, Japan

== In art and popular culture ==
In 1999, the artists Tobias Kipp and Timo Pitkämö developed a technique of drawing portraits with burning sparklers on paper, which they called pyrografie. Since then the two artists have drawn more than 20,000 pyroportraits. In 2007, art group Monochrom lit 10,000 bound sparklers which it described as "symbolic liberation" from monotheistic traditions. A large group from Toronto, Ontario, Canada, also held an event displaying 10,000 sparklers to symbolize brightness, intensity, warmth and creativity.

== See also ==
- Consumer fireworks
- Senko hanabi, Japanese-style sparkler
- Sparkling
