= Spark (surname) =

Spark is a surname. Notable people with the surname include:

- Alex Spark (1949–1993), Scottish footballer
- Alexander Brodie Spark (1792–1856), Scottish-born Australian merchant
- Anna Smith Spark (born 1978 or 1979), British fantasy author
- Debra Spark (born 1962), American writer
- Jeany Spark (born 1982), British actress
- Muriel Spark (1918–2006), Scottish novelist
- Nick T. Spark, American film-maker and writer
