= Gipsy Moth IV =

Ketch

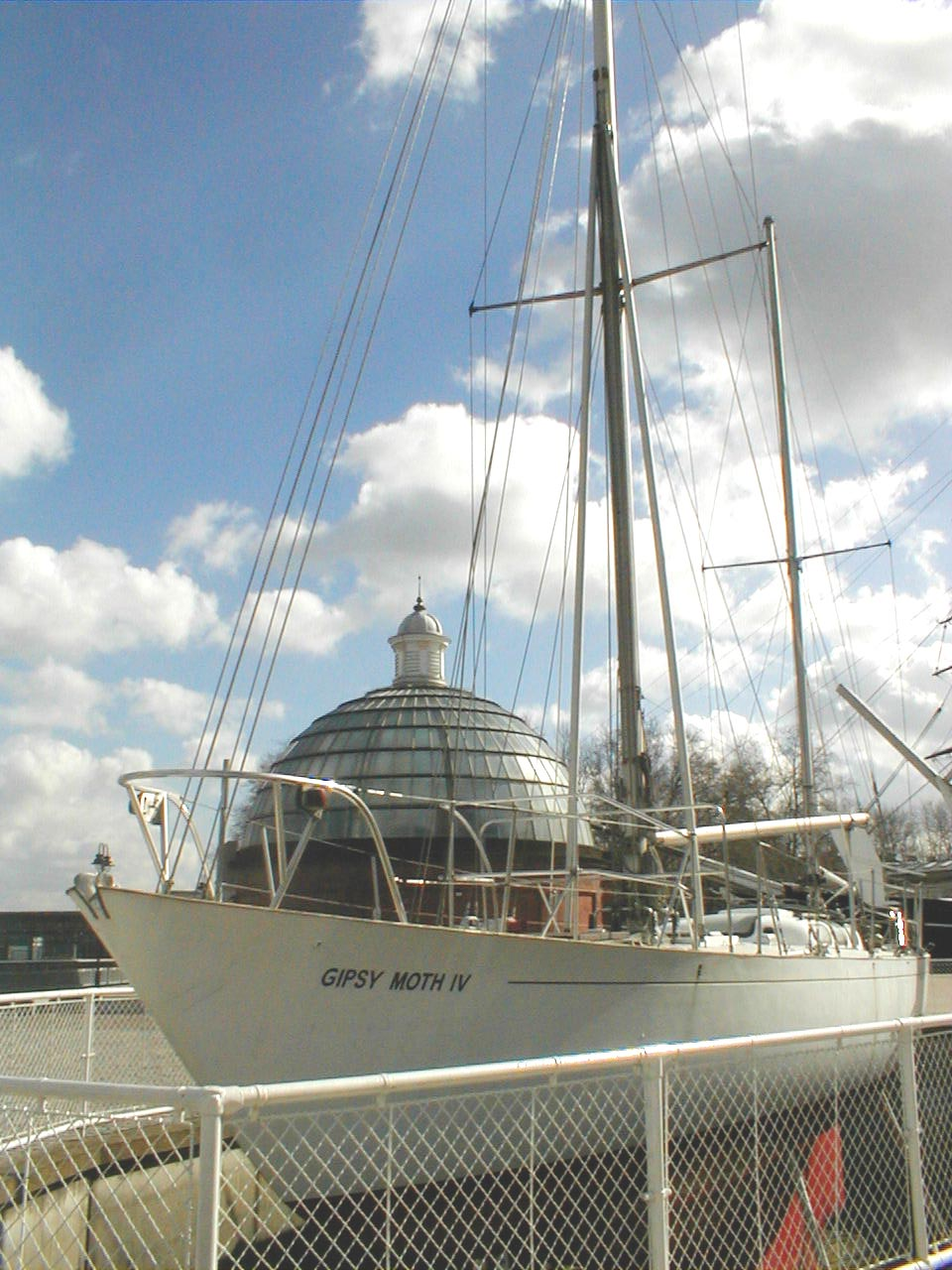
- The Gipsy Moth IV on display in Greenwich, England.

History

United Kingdom
- Name: Gipsy Moth IV
- Owner: Francis Chichester
- Launched: March 1966
- In service: 27 August 1966
- Status: In active service with the "Royal Thames Yacht Club"
- Notes: Restored in 2004 and 2022

General characteristics
- Sail plan: Ketch

Gipsy Moth IV is a 53 ft (16 m) ketch that Sir Francis Chichester commissioned specifically to sail single-handed around the globe, racing against the times set by the clipper ships of the 19th century.

Gipsy Moth IV was the first ever purpose-built ocean racer and has over the years become the most famous of small sailing vessels. Gipsy Moth IV's voyage was the inspiration for the Golden Globe Race (GGR) which continues today.

The name of this vessel – the fourth boat in Chichester's series, all named Gipsy Moth – originated from the de Havilland Gipsy Moth aircraft in which Chichester completed pioneering work in aerial navigation techniques.

== Background and design ==
After being nursed back to health from a suspected lung abscess by his wife, Chichester undertook two single-handed Transatlantic races from Plymouth to New York in 1960 and Plymouth to Newport in 1964 in Gipsy Moth III. He won the '60 race and was runner-up in the '64 race. During the '64 race he became inspired to challenge the times set by the tea and wool clipper ships. The tea clippers took an average of 123 days to make their passage to the East Indies, so Chichester set himself the target of making the passage in 100 days. He subsequently wrote his book Along the Clipper Way, which charts the voyage taken by 19th century wool clippers returning from Australia.

In 1965 Chichester commissioned Gosport-based ship yard Camper and Nicholsons to build the boat, designed by John Illingworth and Angus Primrose. Launched in March 1966 with yard number 916, Gipsy Moth IV is 38 ft 6 in (11.73 m) on the waterline and 53 ft (16 m) overall, with a hull constructed of cold-moulded Honduras mahogany. The scheduled displacement (to follow Chichester's requirements of maximum weight) was 10.4 tons, after trials increased by 1 ton of added ballast to cope with insufficient righting moment. Ketch rigged, she has a sail area of 854 sq ft (79.3 m^{2}), extendable with a spinnaker to over 1,500 sq ft (140 m^{2}). The boat incorporated the maximum amount of sail for the minimum amount of rigging, whilst employing tiller based self-steering using design principles established by Blondie Hasler that could enable steerage from the skipper's bunk, essential for solo sailing for a voyage of this length.

== 1966–67 voyage ==
Gipsy Moth IV set out from Plymouth on 27 August 1966 with 64-year-old Sir Francis at the helm. The voyage was not uneventful, and Chichester later recalled three moments where he noted that the trip nearly ended. The first was when part of the frame holding the wind vane self-steering failed, when still 2,300 nautical miles (4,300 km) from Sydney. Not wanting to put in at Fremantle, Western Australia, Chichester spent three days balancing sails and experimenting with shock-cord lines on the tiller, once again getting the boat to hold a course to enable her to cover 160 nautical miles (300 km) a day.

An exhausted Chichester entered Sydney harbour for a stopover 107 days later. He enlisted the help of America's Cup designer Warwick Hood, who added a piece to the boat's keel to provide Gipsy Moth IV with better directional stability to stop her broaching, but the modification did nothing to improve her stability.

One day out on the return trip via Cape Horn, the boat was rolled in a 140-degree capsize. Chichester calculated the angle by measuring the mark on the cabin roof made by a wine bottle. He commented in his diary and in a later interview with Time magazine that he knew she would self-right as she was designed to, but was concerned by the incident as this was a light storm and he still had to pass Cape Horn, where the third and most significant event of the voyage would occur:

"The waves were tremendous. They varied each time, but all were like great sloping walls towering behind you. The kind I liked least was like a great bank of gray-green earth 50 ft (15 m) high and very steep. Image yourself at the bottom of one. My cockpit was filled five times and once it took more than 15 minutes to drain. My wind-reading machine stopped recording at 60 knots. My self-steering could not cope with the buffeting....I had a feeling of helplessness."

Just as he thought all hope was lost and he was alone, on exiting the cockpit one day he was followed by the British Antarctic Survey vessel HMS Protector (A146), and later the same day a Piper Apache plane chartered by the BBC and Sunday Times broke through the clouds, searching for Gypsy Moth to take photographs and film footage. On 28 May 1967 having logged 28,500 nautical miles (52,800 km) in just 274 days (226 days actual sailing time), the voyage claimed the following records:

- Fastest voyage around the world by any small vessel
- Longest non stop passage that had been made by a small sailing vessel (15,000 nautical miles (28,000 km; 17,000 mi))
- More than twice the distance of the previous longest passage by a singlehander
- Twice broke the record for a singlehander's week's run by more than 100 nautical miles (190 km)
- Established a record for singlehanded speed by sailing 1,400 nautical miles (2,600 km) in 8 days

Because of the boat lacking of directional stability (despite fin extension) and righting moment, Chichester commented:

"Now that I have finished, I don't know what will become of Gipsy Moth IV. I only own the stern while my cousin owns two thirds. My part, I would sell any day. It would be better if about a third were sawn off. The boat was too big for me. Gipsy Moth IV has no sentimental value for me at all. She is cantankerous and difficult and needs a crew of three - a man to navigate, an elephant to move the tiller and a 3 ft 6 in (1.07 m) chimpanzee with arms 8 ft (2.4 m) long to get about below and work some of the gear."

== Greenwich ==
In July 1968, Gipsy Moth IV was put on permanent display at Greenwich in a land-locked purpose-built dry dock next to the Cutty Sark. The yacht was open to the public for many years. In September 1977 a ceremony was held to mark her 1 millionth visitor on board. Eventually, due to general deterioration from allowing visitors to walk across her decks, Gipsy Moth was permanently closed to visitors, remaining on display at Greenwich next to the Cutty Sark. Her “entombment” at Greenwich was referred to in the song "Single Handed Sailor" by the band Dire Straits. Chichester died at the age of 71 on 26 August 1972.

After 37 years (in 2005) she was freed and relaunched.

== Gipsy Moth IV's restoration ==
By the early 2000s, the condition of Gipsy Moth IV, even though she continued to rest in a Greenwich dry dock hoist, had seriously deteriorated. In 2003, Paul Gelder, editor of the London-based sailing magazine Yachting Monthly, launched a campaign to restore the yacht and sail her around the world in 2006 on the 40th anniversary of Chichester's voyage, and the 100th birthday of the magazine. He enlisted the support of The Blue Water Round the World Rally, a club-style cruising rally that the magazine had been covering since 1995.

In 2004, in a joint proposal with Yachting Monthly and Gipsy Moth IV's owners, The Maritime Trust, the yacht was purchased by the United Kingdom Sailing Academy (UKSA) in Cowes, Isle of Wight, for a token sum of £1 and a gin and tonic (Chichester's favourite tipple). The UKSA, Yachting Monthly and the Maritime Trust were the three major project partners in the campaign to save the yacht.

In November 2004 Gipsy Moth IV was lifted out of Greenwich dry dock and taken by road to Camper and Nicholson's yard in Gosport, where she had been built and launched in 1966, for restoration. Although C&N did the work at cost price, the structural restoration cost more than £300,000, with money raised by donations from the public. Over 9000 hours were spent during the 28 week project. The additional equipment and services were provided by the British marine industry. As part of the yacht's restoration, the original B&G Navigation equipment was replaced with up to date electronics, but the original devices were left on a covering panel to maintain the feel of the 1966 build. On 20 June 2005, Gipsy Moth IV was relaunched and put back into "active service" by HRH Princess Anne.

=== Second voyage ===
Gipsy Moth IV set sail from Plymouth Sound on the first leg of the 2005–07 Blue Water Round the World Rally on 25 September 2005. She had a mixture of experienced crew and teams of disadvantaged youth on board, including for part of the voyage:

- Skipper: Richard Bagget
- First mate: Dewi Thomas
- Crew Leader: Paul Gelder (Editor of Yachting Monthly)
- Crew: Matthew Pakes (Isle of Wight), Peter Heggie (Plymouth), Elaine Cadwell (Scotland)

The first leg took just over two weeks to reach Gibraltar, the official starting point for the Blue Water Round the World Rally. After crossing the Bay of Biscay to make landfall in Bayona, Spain, where Paul Gelder left to return to the UK, there was a crew change at Vilamoura, Portugal, and Tom Buggy joined the yacht as Crew Leader for the rest of the leg. Yachting Monthly's Dick Durham sailed the next leg and crew leader to the Canary Islands, where James Jermain took over as Mate to Richard Baggett for the Atlantic crossing to Antigua. The yacht went through the Panama Canal in February 2006 and headed for the Galapagos islands and the Marquesas.

On April 29, 2006, after a navigational error, Gipsy Moth ran aground on a coral reef at Rangiroa, an atoll in the Tuamotus, known as The Dangerous Archipelago in the Pacific Ocean. She was just 200 miles (320 km) from her next landfall, Tahiti. The yacht was seriously damaged. After six days, a major salvage operation was undertaken with Smit, the Dutch big ship experts who were called in by the UKSA, with local help from Tahiti and Rangiroa. After a day-and-a-half spent patching up the holes in the hull with sheets of plywood, the yacht was successfully towed off the reef into deep water on a makeshift 'sledge'. She was towed to Tahiti and put on a cargo ship to be taken to New Zealand. In Auckland, Grant Dalton's America's Cup team donated help and premises at their HQ in Viaduct Harbour, and the yacht underwent a second restoration. After two weeks or so she was sailing again on 23 June 2006.

Her return leg was via Cairns and Darwin, in Australia; Indonesia, Singapore, Phuket, Sri Lanka, the Red Sea, Suez Canal and the Mediterranean. She docked in Gibraltar for a crew change, with skipper John Jeffrey joined by British teenagers: Grant McCabe (Plymouth), Kerry Prideaux (Lynton, Devon), Glen Austin (Isle of Wight) - the last of 90 disadvantaged young people who had crewed the yacht on her 28,264-mile (45,486 km) voyage round the world. She was accompanied into Plymouth by a flotilla of small craft, Gipsy Moth IV docked at West Hoe Pier on 28 May 2007, as she did exactly 40 years earlier. She was welcomed home by Giles Chichester, son of Sir Francis Chichester.

=== The Gipsy Moth Trust ===
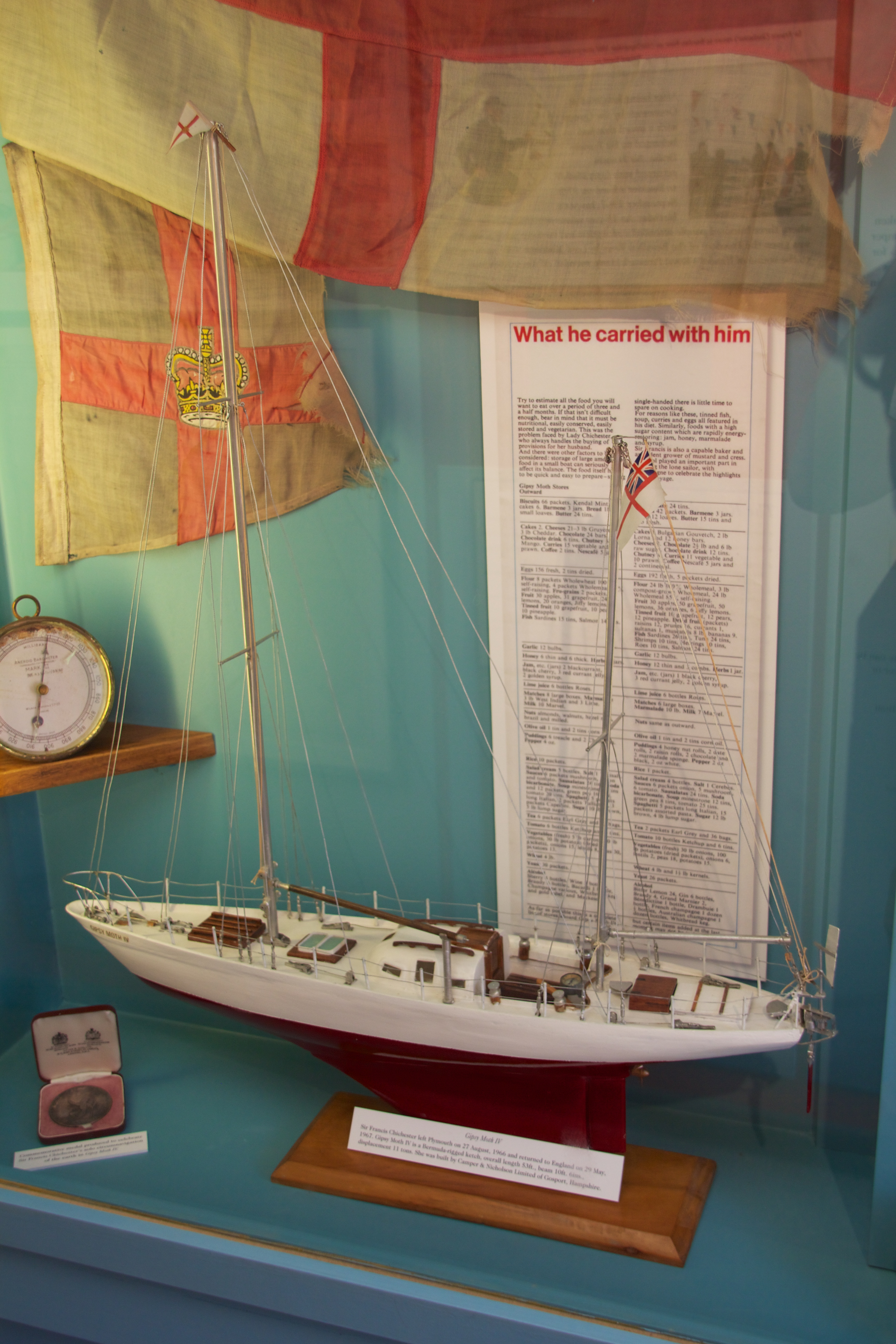
A model of Gipsy Moth IV at Bucklers Hard

For some time Gipsy Moth IV lay in Lymington Marina, stored at the end of a line of yachts for sale in the boat yard. In November 2010, she was sold to new British owners and remained at Cowes on display to the public.

Gipsy Moth IV sailed at classic regattas in the summer of 2011, including Suffolk Yacht Harbour Classic Regatta (18–19 June), JP Morgan Asset Management Round the Island Race (25 June), Panerai British Classic Week (16–23 July) and Aberdeen Asset Management Cowes Week (6–13 August). She was one of a number of important vessels which were moored along the route of the Thames Diamond Jubilee Pageant, to celebrate the diamond jubilee of Queen Elizabeth II. Due to her size, she was not part of the flotilla of vessels, and instead was moored with other vessels at St Katharine Docks, in a display known as the Avenue of Sail.

Gipsy Moth IV was a regular visitor to Bucklers Hard, especially for winter maintenance, during which times she was viewed by the public on special open days. In May 2017 she attended the Jersey Boat Show to celebrate the 50th anniversary of Chichester's circumnavigation.

The yacht was owned and maintained by The Gipsy Moth Trust, a registered charity, until 2021. Her costs were funded by paying passengers and crew, and by donations to the Trust.

In February 2021 she was put up for sale by the Trust when COVID-19 badly affected the continued operation of the Trust.

== Second restoration ==
In March 2022, Gipsy Moth IV was purchased by Simon Oberholzer. Oberholzer undertook her second complete restoration, back to her original 1967 state, at the Elephant Boatyard on the River Hamble. As Gipsy Moth has a full keel and wide turning circle, and in order to manoeuvre her into small spaces in today's marinas, a specially designed electric powered water thruster was developed and installed in the bow during the restoration. This allows Gipsy Moth IV to turn easily without compromising her structural integrity or ruining the aesthetics of her classic lines. Gipsy Moth IV's 2022 outer-restoration was completed just a day before her Royal Review by the Princess Royal at Cowes Week and the Solent Platinum Jubilee Celebration on 6 August 2022. The cumulative cost of the Gipsy Moth IV and restorations now exceeds £2 million.

In addition to the restoration, Oberholzer has collected more than one thousand documents, articles, artifacts and other memorabilia (ranging from minted coins to issued stamps and tea clothes) which relate to Gipsy Moth IV and which secures her status as a sailing legend.

The inside back cover of Series B British passports, issued between 2015 and 2020, have an illustration of Gipsy Moth IV.

The restoration activities surrounding Gipsy Moth IV during 2022–2023 have not been limited to the yacht itself, but have been extended to include the creation and updating of the Gipsy Moth IV logo by Bas van der Heide, who has a long association with various of The Ocean Race yachts (and who designed boats like ABN Amro 1 and 2 – and most recently Jajo in 2023). In addition, a website about Gipsy Moth IV and Sir Francis Chichester was created.

=== Channel crossing ===
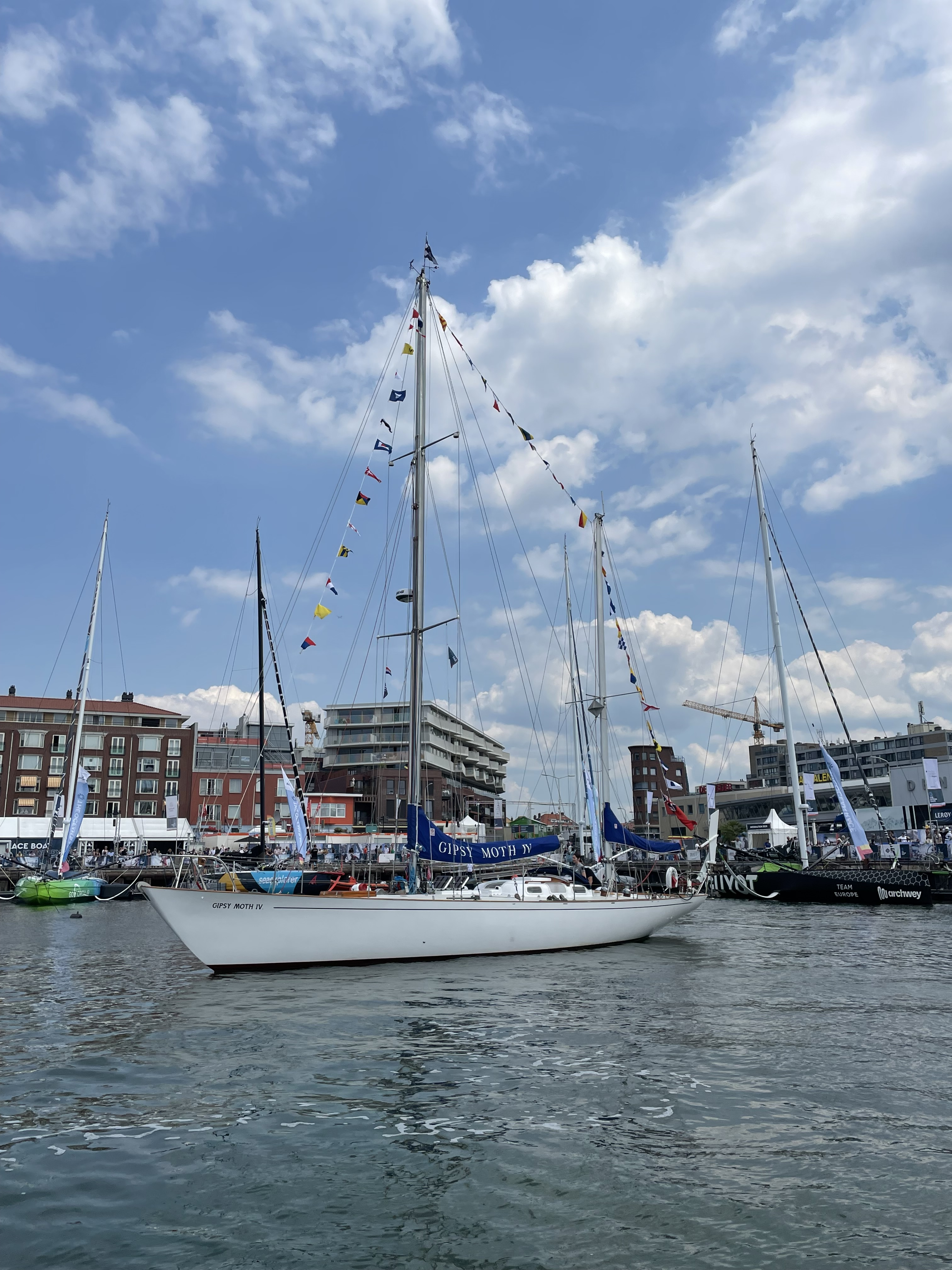
Gipsy Moth IV salutes The Ocean Race partipicants June 15, 2023

On the day of the Coronation of King Charles III (6 May 2023) Gipsy Moth IV departed Ramsgate for The Netherlands, making her first voyage away from British waters in 16 years. The last time she left was during the Blue Water Rally voyage in 2005–2007. Gipsy Moth IV's first port of call was Scheveningen, The Netherlands. In August 2023 Gipsy Moth IV was open to the public shortly at the National Maritime Museum (Het Scheepvaart) in Amsterdam.

At the start of the final leg of the Ocean Race 2023, at the Hague, Gipsy Moth IV provided a full dress salute to the participating boats and the following day, the same to the Admiral of the Dutch navy at the Scheveningen harbour's Vlaggetjesdag festival, which has been held annually since 1947.

=== Return to 1967 sailing state ===
The restoration has continued on the interior of Gipsy Moth IV on the dry in Ijmuiden, The Netherlands. The work has been done from artisans from Netherlands, Spain, South Africa and the United Kingdom who have repainted the complete interior, repaired equipment and have removed and replaced all the "Greenwich museum" floorcoverings in order to return her to the actual 1967 sailing state. Gipsy Moth IV has been relaunched during the week of 28 May 2025.

=== World Sailing Day - 28 May ===
The date of Gipsy Moth IV's return to Plymouth on the 28 May, has been selected to celebrate globally " World Sailing Day" each year. See www.worldsailingday.org .

Author	Title	Publisher	Date	ISBN/URL	Type
Francis Chichester	Along The Clipper Way	Hodder & Stoughton	1966	978-0-340-00191-2	Book
Francis Chichester	The Lonely Sea and the Sky	Hodder & Stoughton	1964	978-0-345-21515-4	Book
Francis Chichester	Atlantic Adventure	George Allen & Unwin Ltd	1962	978-0-04-910004-6	Book
Francis Chichester	Solo to Sydney	Conway Maritime Publishers	1982	978-0-85177-254-7	Book
Theo Rye	Great yacht design 12 – Gipsy Moth IV	Classic Boat	2017	URL: https://www.classicboat.co.uk/articles/great-yacht-designs-12-gipsy-moth-iv/	Web Article
Francis Chichester	Alone Over The Tasman Sea	George Allen & Unwin Ltd	1945	978-1-5098-2579-0	Book
Francis Chichester	Alone Across The Atlantic	Bello	1968	978-0-04-910035-0	Book
Francis Chichester	Ride on the Wind	Hamish Hamilton	1967	978-1-55778-223-6	Book
Sheila Chichester	Two Lives, two worlds-Autobiography	Hodder & Stoughton	1969	978-0-340-10626-6	Book
Ian Strathcarron	Never Fear: Reliving the Life of Sir Francis Chichester	Unicorn Publishing Group	2016	978-1-910787-16-8	Book
Frank Carr	GIPSY MOTH IV:Round the World with Sir Francis Chichester''	Pitkin Pictorials	1969	ASIN B000WSLW84	Book
Anita Leslie:A biography	Francis Chichester: A biography	Hutchinson	1967	978-0-340-40667-0	Book
Don Holm	The Circumnavigators	Prentice-Hall	1974	978-0-13-134452-5	Chapter
Brandt Aymar	Men at Sea: Men at Sea:The Best Sea Stories of All Time	Barrie & Jenkins	1989	978-0-340-40667-0	Book
Graham Snook	GIPSY MOTH IV:A DUD OR A CLASSIC?	Ocean sailor Stories-Kraken yachts	2021	URL:https://krakenyachts.com/gipsy-moth-iv-a-dud-or-a-classic/	Web Article
Kevin Green	SAILING A LEGEND	Boating New Zealand	2020	URL:https://boatingnz.co.nz/gipsy-moth-iv-restored/	Web Article
Ian Strathcarron	Sir Francis Chichester changed my life	Classic Boat Magazine	2016	URL: https://www.classicboat.co.uk/articles/sir-francis-chichester-changed-life/	Web Article
Charles Doane	Driving Miss Gipsy (Moth IV)	Wavetrain Blog	2021	URL: https://wavetrain.net/2010/02/09/driving-miss-gipsy-moth-iv/	Web Article
Kim Kavin	A Piece of History	Soundings	2021	URL: https://www.soundingsonline.com/voices/a-piece-of-history	Book
BBC.COM News Editor	Gypsy Moth IV returns for round-the-world anniversary	BBC	2016	URL: https://www.bbc.com/news/uk-england-hampshire-37049232	News Article
Lars Reisberg	READING SIR FRANCIS CHICHESTER'S "GIPSY MOTH CIRCLES THE WORLD"	NO FRILLS SAILING.com	2016	URL: https://no-frills-sailing.com/reading-sir-francis-chichesters-gipsy-moth-circles-the-world//	Web Article
Anna Symcox	Kiwis beat the clock on Gipsy Moth IV	Sail World Magazine	2006	URL: https://www.sail-world.com/Australia/Kiwis-beat-the-clock-on-Gipsy-Moth-IV/-25021?source=google	Web Article
Andrew Bray	Reflecting on the Journey of Sir Francis Chichester	mysailing.com.au	2017	URL: https://www.mysailing.com.au/sailing-a-classic//	Web Article
Charles J. Doane	Reflecting on the Journey of Sir Francis Chichester	SAIL Magazine	2017/2015	URL: https://www.sailmagazine.com/cruising/reflecting-on-the-journey-of-sir-francis-chichester/	Web Article
Epco Ongering	Gipsy Moth IV: varen op een legende	boottesten.nl	2022	URL: https://boottesten.nl/gipsy-moth-iv-varen-op-een-legende/	Web Article
Watersport-tv.nlEditor	Legendarische Gipsy Moth IV in Nederland	watersport-tv.nl	2023	URL: https://www.watersport-tv.nl/nw-31400-7-4234030/nieuws/legendarische_gipsy_moth_iv_in_nederland.html/	Web Article
Zeilen.nl Editor	Gipsy Moth IV weer rond de wereld	www.zeilen.nl	2004	URL: https://www.zeilen.nl/actueel/nieuws/gipsy_moth_iv_weer_rond_de_wereld/	Web Article
