= The Spark (magazine) =

Magazine for Bristol area

- Categories: Ecological and holistic themes
- Frequency: Quarterly
- Founder: John Dawson
- First issue: 1 January 1993; 33 years ago
- Final issue: 15 April 2019; 7 years ago
- Company: Blue Sax Publishing Ltd
- Country: United Kingdom
- Based in: Bristol
- Language: English
- ISSN: 0969-4811
- OCLC: 226030223

The Spark was a free quarterly magazine published in Bristol, England, from 1993 to 2019. Covering green, ecological, holistic and alternative themes, it distributed over two million copies across its 26-year run.

== History ==
The Spark was founded in 1993 by John Dawson, and published by his company Blue Sax Publishing Ltd. It was printed in A3 format and distributed free of charge across Bristol and the south-west of England, covering Bath, Glastonbury and Stroud. The magazine generated revenue through a directory of listings advertisements covering complementary health practitioners, green businesses, ethical organisations and related services.

The magazine ran into financial difficulty after its first edition in 1993 and was saved by a group of supporters who organised £10,000 of advertising. It settled into a quarterly publication schedule from issue 14 (Autumn 1998). Print runs grew from 10,000 at launch to 25,000 by the early 2000s.

The magazine closed in July 2014. The title was subsequently bought out of receivership by Phil Haughton of The Better Food Company and revived in association with Bristol 24/7, but failed to find a sustainable revenue model. The final edition was published on 15 April 2019.

== Background ==
Bristol's concentration of organisations involved in sustainability, ethical finance and environmental advocacy provided a natural readership and advertising base for the magazine. The city was home to Sustrans, the Soil Association and Triodos Bank, among others.

== Significance ==
Dominic Corrywright, senior lecturer in the Study of Religions at Oxford Brookes University, wrote a chapter on The Spark in his monograph Theoretical and Empirical Investigations into New Age Spiritualities, a book based on his earlier PhD thesis, using the magazine as contributing to the empirical evidence for his analysis of alternative spirituality networks in the south-west of England.

In 2012 the magazine was profiled in The Guardian in a series on small businesses. The then editor outlined how the magazine won a bid to produce a festival programme, and outlined how while staying true to the magazine's values, it was possible for a small team of five staff can deliver a good quality, large scale publication.

== Archive ==
A physical archive of back copies (1993-2014) is held at Bristol Central Library. An incomplete set of print copies is also held at the British Library at their Boston Spa site in Yorkshire.
