= Spark (Matayoshi novel) =

2015 Japanese novel

- Cover of the English version of Spark.
- Author: Matayoshi, Naoki
- Original title: 火花
- Translator: Alison Watts
- Language: Japanese
- Genre: Novel
- Published: 05/03/2020
- Publisher: Pushkin Press
- Publication place: Japan
- Pages: 160
- ISBN: 9781782275909

Spark (original title: 火花) is a 2015 novel written by Japanese comedian Naoki Matayoshi. The story revolves around the career struggles of and relationship between two manzai comedians. The English version of the novel is translated by Alison Watts and published in 2020. The novel won the 153rd Akutagawa Prize and was adapted as a Netflix original series which is accessible worldwide.

== Synopsis ==
Tokunaga is a young comedian struggling to make a name for himself when he is taken under the wing of Kamiya, who is either a crazy genius or perhaps just crazy. Kamiya's indestructible confidence inspires Tokunaga, but it also makes him doubt the limits of his own talent, and dedication to manzai comedy.

== Reception ==
=== Sales ===
As of February 2017, the Japanese version of the book has sold more than 2.53 million copies.

=== Awards ===
- The 153rd Akutagawa Prize (2015)
- The 28th Shogakukan DIME Trend Awards "Leisure and Entertainment Category" (2015)
- Yahoo! Search Award 2015 Novel Award (2015)

== Television adaptation ==
A 10-episode web television adaptation, titled Hibana: Spark, premiered on Netflix as an original series on June 2, 2016.
