= Sparq =

Sparq may refer to:

- SPARQL, programming language
- SPARQCode, standard encoding for the contents of a QR barcode
- SPARQ Training, creators of a standardized test for athleticism
- SyQuest SparQ drive, a short-lived (1998–1999) removable-disk hard drive

== See also ==
- Spark (disambiguation)
