= Sparks, Kentucky =

Unincorporated community in Kentucky, United States

- Unincorporated community
- Location within the state of Kentucky Sparks (the United States)
- Coordinates: 37°43′12″N 83°46′18″W
- Country: United States
- State: Kentucky
- County: Estill
- Elevation: 1,047 ft (319 m)
- Time zone: UTC-5 (Eastern (EST))
  - Summer (DST): UTC-4 (EDT)
- GNIS feature ID: 2508710

Sparks was an unincorporated community located in Estill County, Kentucky, United States.
