= SPAC =

SPAC primarily refers to a special-purpose acquisition company, a method of taking a company public by merging it with an already public investment company.

SPAC may also refer to:

- Henry Crown Sports and Aquatics Center, a sports facility at Northwestern University often abbreviated as "SPAC"
- São Paulo Athletic Club
- Saratoga Performing Arts Center, Saratoga Springs, New York
- Shaw Performing Arts Centre, Winnipeg, Canada
- Shizuoka Performing Arts Center, Shizuoka, Japan
- Soil plant atmosphere continuum
- Spaç Prison, former prison in Albania

== See also ==
- Space (disambiguation)
- PAC (disambiguation)
