= Sun glitter =

Sparkling sunlight reflections off water

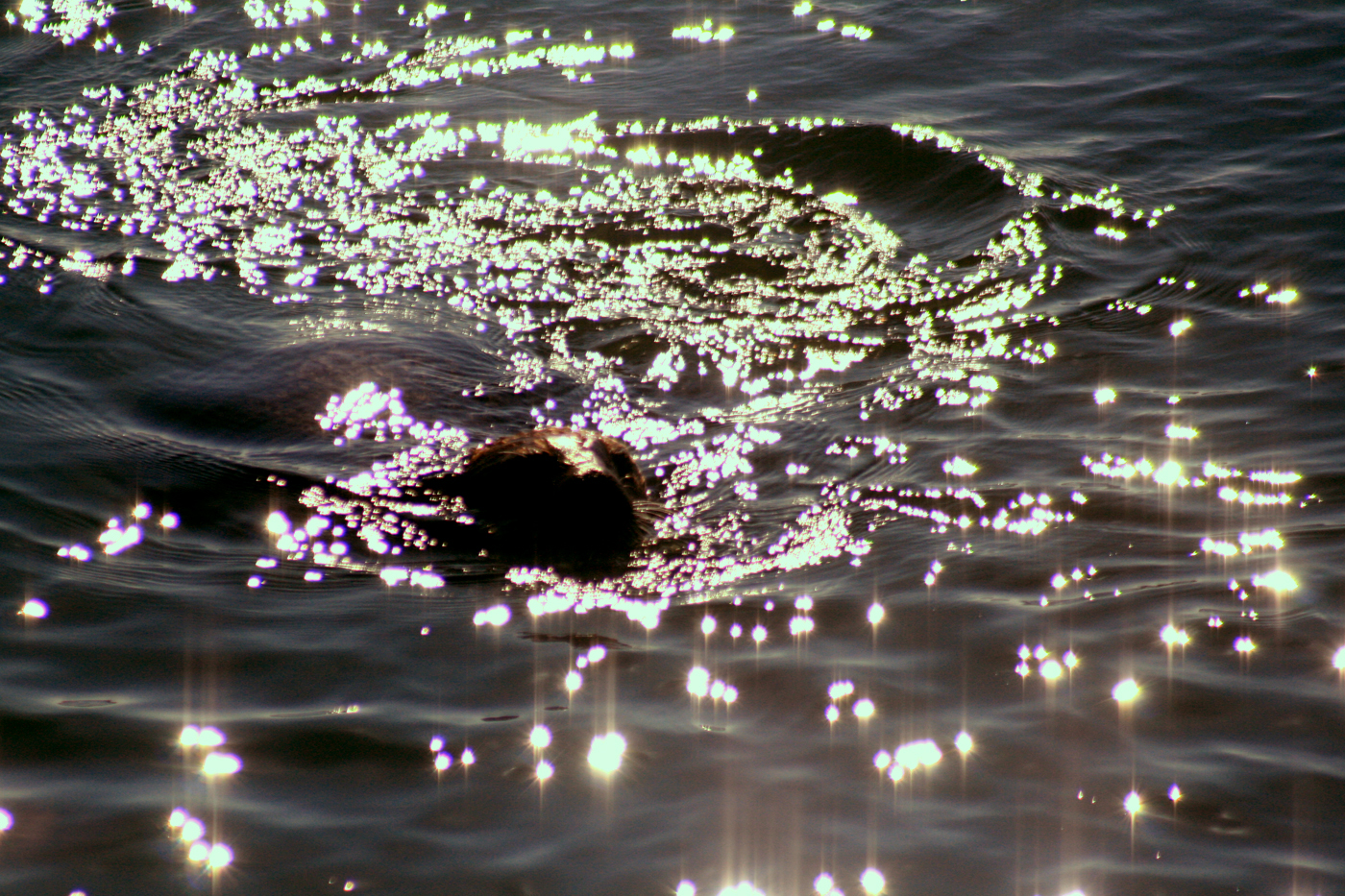
Sea otter and sun glitter

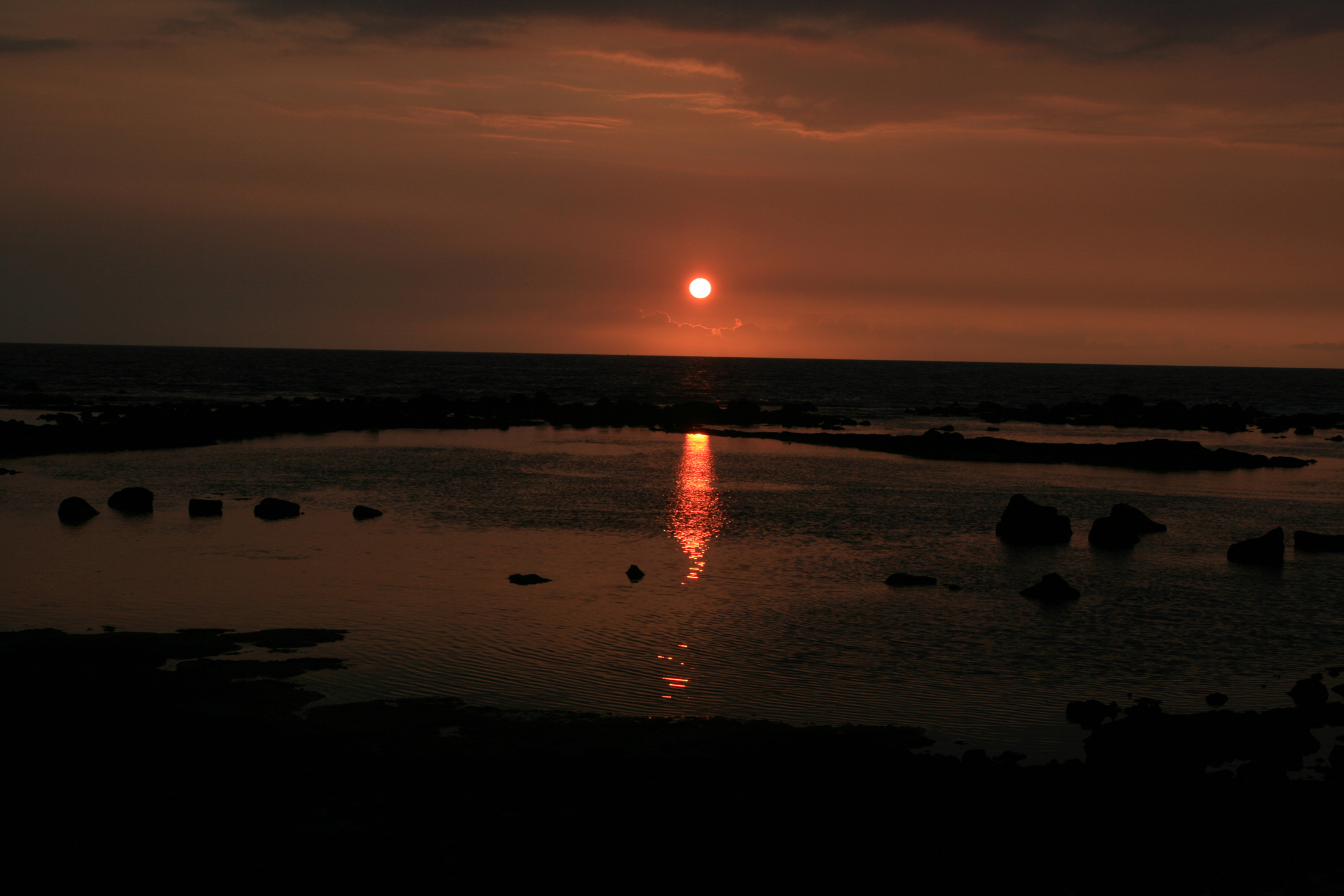
Sun glitter

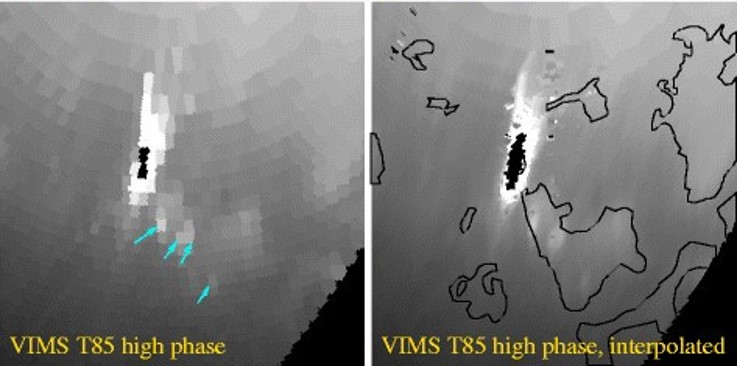
Sun glitter (blue arrows) in Punga Mare (central black outline)

Sun glitter is a bright, sparkling light formed when sunlight reflects from water waves. The waves may be caused by natural movement of the water, or by the movement of birds or animals in the water. Even a ripple from a thrown rock will create a momentary glitter.

Light reflects from smooth surfaces by specular reflection. A rippled but locally smooth surface such as water with waves will reflect the sun at different angles at each point on the surface of the waves. As a result, a viewer in the right position will see many small images of the sun, formed by portions of waves that are oriented correctly to reflect the sun's light to the viewer's eyes. The exact pattern seen depends on the viewer's precise location. The color and the length of the glitter depend on the altitude of the Sun. The lower the sun appears, the longer and more reddish the glitter is. When the sun is really low above the horizon, the glitter breaks because of the waves, which could sometimes obstruct the sun and cast a shadow on the glitter.

Sun glitter is observed on other planetary bodies with surface liquids, namely Titan. Titan hosts lakes and seas of liquid methane at its north polar region. Sun glitter was discovered on Titan's smallest sea, Punga Mare, in 2014 as a set of brightened pixels at infrared wavelengths across Punga Mare's bright sea surface. The glitter was likely caused by springtime winds. Sun glitter has also been observed in the largest sea, Kraken Mare, during the northern summer. Tidal currents in narrow straits and summer winds were the probable causes of the Kraken sun glitter.
