= Hibana: Spark =

Japanese television series

- Promotional poster
- Based on: Hibana by Naoki Matayoshi
- Screenplay by: Masato Kato; Miyuki Takahashi; Yuko Kato
- Directed by: Ryūichi Hiroki; Kazuya Shiraishi; Shuichi Okita; Yasunori Mouri; Shinji Kuma
- Starring: Kento Hayashi; Kazuki Namioka; Mugi Kadowaki; Masao Yoshii; Hideaki Murata; Nahana; Sayaka Yamamoto; Shōta Sometani; Tomorowo Taguchi; Kaoru Kobayashi
- Composers: Kōji Ueno; Tōru Ishitsuka
- Country of origin: Japan
- Original language: Japanese
- No. of episodes: 10

Production
- Producers: Akihiko Okamoto; Keiichi Yoshizaki; David Lee; Noriyasu Kamiki

Original release
- Network: Netflix
- Release: June 2, 2016

Hibana: Spark (火花) is a television series adaptation of the novel Spark by Naoki Matayoshi. It premiered worldwide on Netflix on June 2, 2016. The story follows an aspiring stand-up comedian Tokunaga (Kento Hayashi), who embarks on an apprenticeship with Kamiya (Kazuki Namioka), a seasoned manzai artist.

== Cast ==
- Kento Hayashi as Tokunaga
- Kazuki Namioka as Kamiya
- Mugi Kadowaki as Maki
- Masao Yoshii (Inoshita Yoshii) as Yamashita
- Hideaki Murata (Toro salmon) as Ōbayashi
- Nahana as Erika Nishida
- Sayaka Yamamoto as waitress
- Eri Tokunaga as Ayumi
- Maryjun Takahashi as Yurie
- Rina Takeda
- Shugo Oshinari as Sasamoto
- Kyūsaku Shimada
- Shōta Sometani as Ogata
- Tomorowo Taguchi as Hyuga
- Kaoru Kobayashi as Watanabe
- Hiro Honda as VIP guest

== Reception ==
David Cirone of J-Generation criticized the slow pacing of the first half of the series, but said "even with its rough edges, Hibana shines with the power of its two leads [Hayashi and Namioka]." Maggie Lee of Variety called the series "a profoundly reflective and achingly tender look at Japan's vibrant yet cutthroat comedy scene". Elissa Loi of Stuff complimented the show for "steering away from the usual predictable Japanese tropes".

== Soundtrack ==
=== Theme song ===
Okamoto's - "Brother" (released June 1, 2016)

=== Soundtrack album ===
Netflix Original Drama Hibana -Spark- Soundtrack (released February 26, 2017 by Yoshimoto Music Ltd.)

| Track# | Track title | English translation | Artist |
|---|---|---|---|
| 01. | "Prologue" | Prologue | 上野耕路 |
| 02. | "I See Reflections in Your Eyes" | I See Reflections in Your Eyes | 木戸やすひろ・上野耕路 |
| 03. | "伝記" | Biography | 上野耕路 |
| 04. | "師弟" | Junior Brother | 上野耕路 |
| 05. | "Night" | Night | 大和女幸・上野耕路 |
| 06. | "戯れ" | Play | 上野耕路 |
| 07. | "公園" | Park | 上野耕路 |
| 08. | "平穏" | Calm | 石塚徹 |
| 09. | "平安" | Peace | 石塚徹 |
| 10. | "太鼓" | (Traditional Japanese) Drum | 石塚徹 |
| 11. | "不調和" | Dissonance | 上野耕路 |
| 12. | "吉祥寺" | Kichijōji (the city name) | 上野耕路 |
| 13. | "Corduroy" | Corduroy | 上野耕路 |
| 14. | "おにまんま" | Demon Rice (nickname of a cuisine Maki prepared) | 上野耕路 |
| 15. | "I See Reflections in Your Eyes (String Quartet Version)" | I See Reflections in Your Eyes | 上野耕路 |
| 16. | "Monochrome" | Monochrome | 上野耕路 |
| 17. | "愉快酒" | | 沖田修一とアモーレスターズ |
| 18. | "さすらい" | Wandering | 石塚徹 |
| 19. | "視線" | Sight | 石塚徹 |
| 20. | "うたかた" | | 石塚徹 |
| 21. | "Attack" | Attack | 鈴木俊介 |
| 22. | "Dance" | Dance | TEMMA-Teje |
| 23. | "ガラクタ" | | 石塚徹 |
| 24. | "Irony" | Irony | 石塚徹 |
| 25. | "引越し" | | 石塚徹 |
| 26. | "Kick Sparks" | Kick Sparks | 石塚徹 |
| 27. | "自戒" | | 上野耕路 |
| 28. | "屈折" | | 上野耕路 |
| 29. | "New Life" | New Life | 上野耕路 |
| 30. | "Spark" | Spark | 石塚徹 |
| 31. | "I See Reflections in Your Eyes (Long Version)" | I See Reflections in Your Eyes | 木戸やすひろ・上野耕路 |
