= Magnalium =

Aluminium alloy

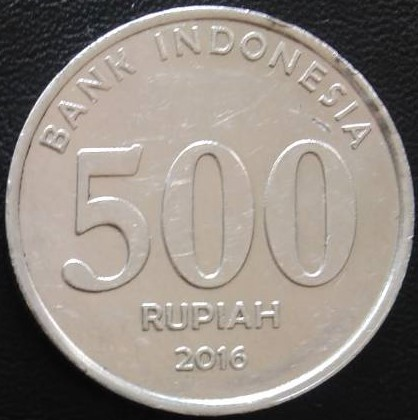
The Indonesian 500-rupiah coin is made of magnalium.

Magnalium is an alloy of aluminium and magnesium.

== Properties ==
Alloys with small amounts of magnesium (about 5%) exhibit greater strength, greater corrosion resistance, and lower density than pure aluminium. Such alloys are also more workable and easier to weld than pure aluminium. Alloys with high amounts of magnesium (around 50%) are brittle and more susceptible to corrosion than aluminium. Generally, these are not true alloys but intermetallic compounds.

== Uses ==
Although they are generally more expensive than aluminium, the high strength, low density, and greater workability of alloys with low amounts of magnesium leads to their use in aircraft and automobile parts. Such alloys are also used for making balance beams and other components of light instruments.

=== Pyrotechnics ===
Alloys with about 50% magnesium are unsuitable for most engineering uses. These compounds are flammable when powdered, are more resistant to corrosion than pure magnesium, and are generally more reactive than pure aluminium; they are used in pyrotechnics as a metal fuel for colored flames, to produce sparks in some glitter and streamer stars, and as a more consistent replacement for separate magnesium and aluminium powders in crackling microstars (dragon eggs). Magnalium powder also burns with a crackling sound if burnt by itself.

It is somewhat less reactive than magnesium in most cases, showing no reaction with sulfur in particular, but is nearly as reactive as magnesium with antimony trisulfide (producing the extremely poisonous and flammable Hydrogen sulfide gas) and more dangerously reactive with nitrates, slowly reacting to produce ammonia gas where magnesium only reacts slowly to produce inert products.

In some cases the normally faster-reacting magnesium component of magnalium serves to slow down a reaction due to its higher reactivity in a composition. This occurs in dragon eggs, where slower oxidation of magnesium by lead tetraoxide (Pb_{3}O_{4}) allows time for the formed lead monoxide (PbO) gas to build up without reacting with the aluminium portion, so when the magnesium is finally consumed the aluminium reaction occurs rapidly enough to produce an explosion. If too much magnesium is present in the alloy (or added to the mix), it will burn continuously but not produce the desired effect. Similarly too little magnesium will prevent enough PbO vapor from building up to react rapidly and the aluminium will simply burn.

== See also ==
- Magnesium alloy
- Birmabright
