= Fire drill (tool) =

Fire making device with rotating rod

A fire drill, sometimes called fire-stick, is a device to start a fire by friction between a rapidly rotating wooden rod (the spindle or shaft) and a cavity on a stationary wood piece (the hearth or fireboard).

== Composition ==
The device can be any of the ancient types of hand-operated drills, including a hand drill, bow drill (or strap drill), or pump drill. The spindle is usually 1–2 cm thick and ends in a dull point. The spindle and fireboard are typically made from dry, medium-soft non-resinous wood such as spruce, cedar, balsam, yucca, aspen, basswood, buckeye, willow, tamarack, or similar. The Native American Indians along the western coast of the United States traditionally made use of dead wood from the buckeye tree for preparing the fire-board.

== Principle ==
Whatever the method used to drive the shaft, its lower end is placed into a shallow cavity of the fireboard with a "V" notch cut into it. The primary goal is to generate heat by the friction between the tip of the shaft and the fireboard, controlled by rotation speed and pressure. The heat eventually turns the wood at the point of contact into charcoal, which is ground to a powder by the friction, that collects into the "V" notch. Continuing operation eventually ignites the charcoal dust producing a tiny ember, which can be used to start a fire in a "tinder bundle" (a nest of stringy, fluffy, and combustible material).

Other methods of creating an ember include drilling partway into a hearth made by lashing two sticks together from one side, and then drilling from the other side to meet this hole; or using the area where two branches separate. This is to keep the coal off wet or snow-covered ground.

== Gallery ==
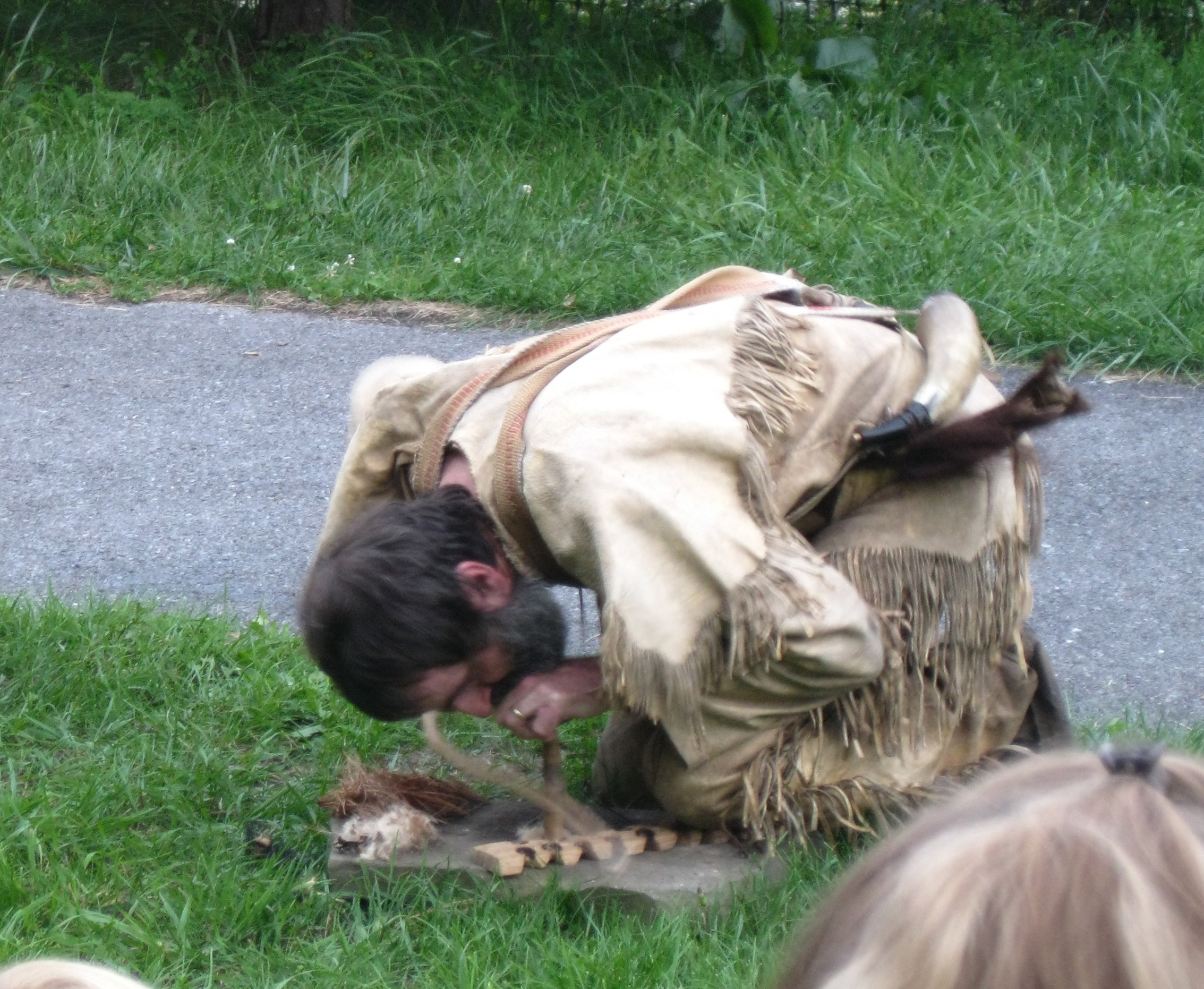
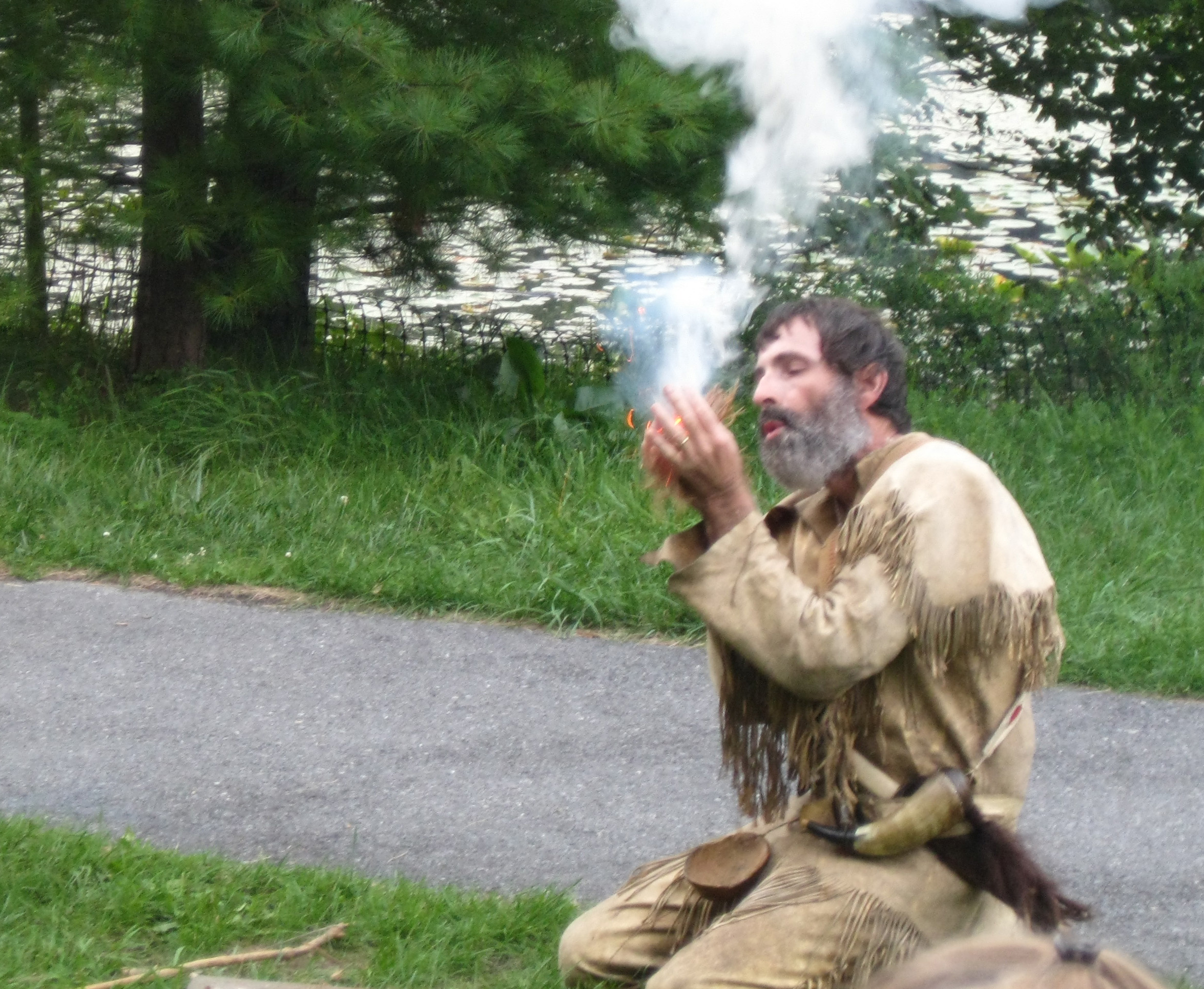
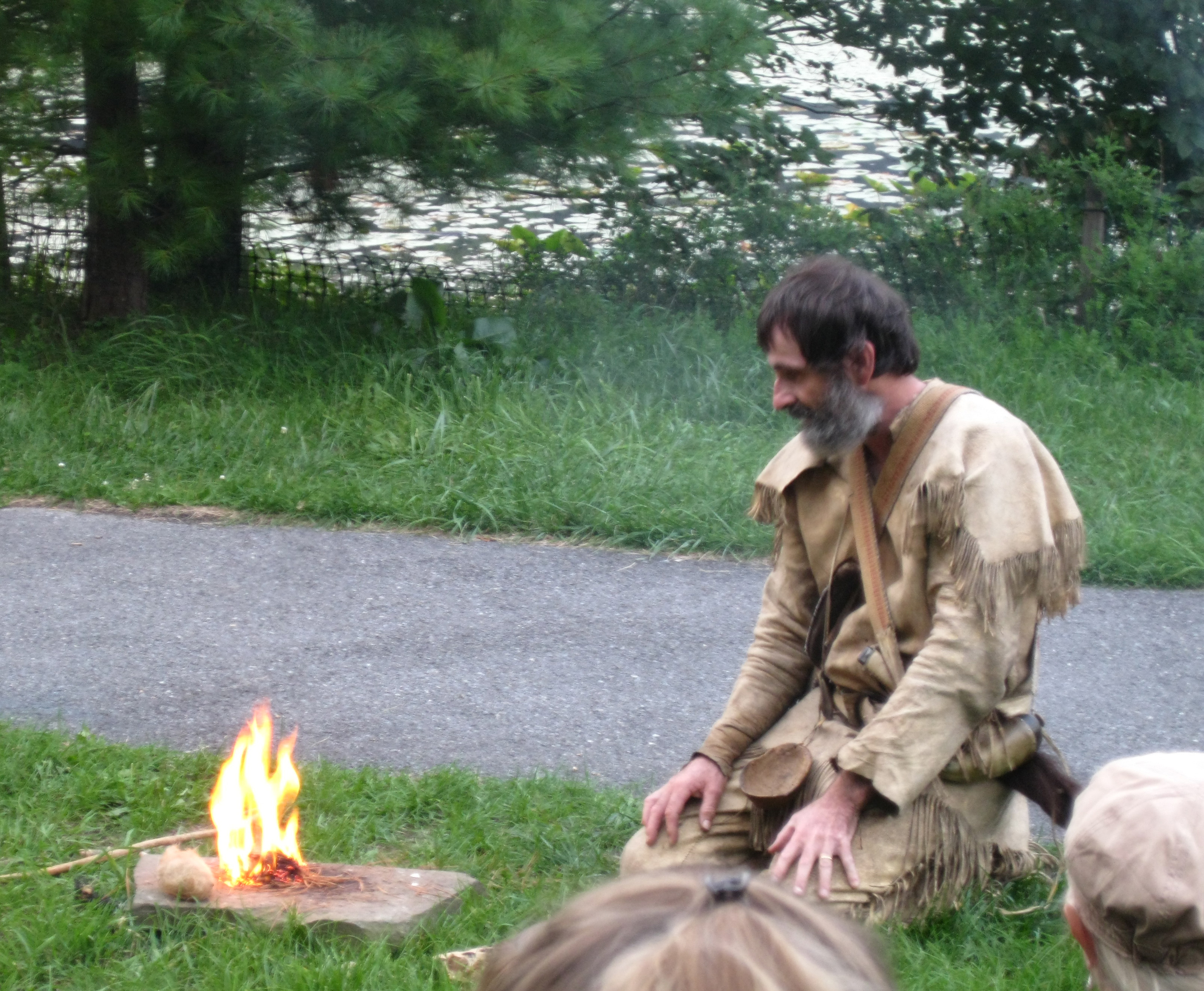
A bow drill is used to ignite an ember, which causes tinder to combust, creating a fire

== See also ==
- Firelighting § Friction
- Control of fire by early humans
- Fire piston
- Campfire

== Relevant literature ==
- Philips-Chan, A. Our Stories Etched in Ivory: The Smithsonian Collections of Engraved Drill Bows with Stories from the Arctic.
