= Fire-saw =

Firelighting tool

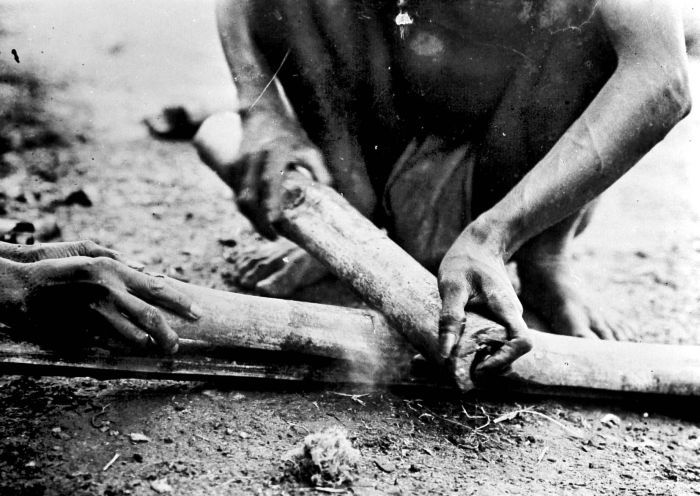
A fire saw being used in Indonesia

A fire-saw is a firelighting tool. It is typically an object "sawed" against a piece of wood, using friction to create an ember. It is divided into two components: a "saw" and a "hearth" (fireboard).

== History ==
Two forms of the fire-saw have been documented in central and western Australia. One model is a split, notched stick as a hearth, and a knife-like hardwood stick as the saw. The other model makes use of the woomera weapon and defensive shield that natives carried.

In the Philippines and Oceania, a fire-saw from bamboo pieces is common.

== Fire thong ==
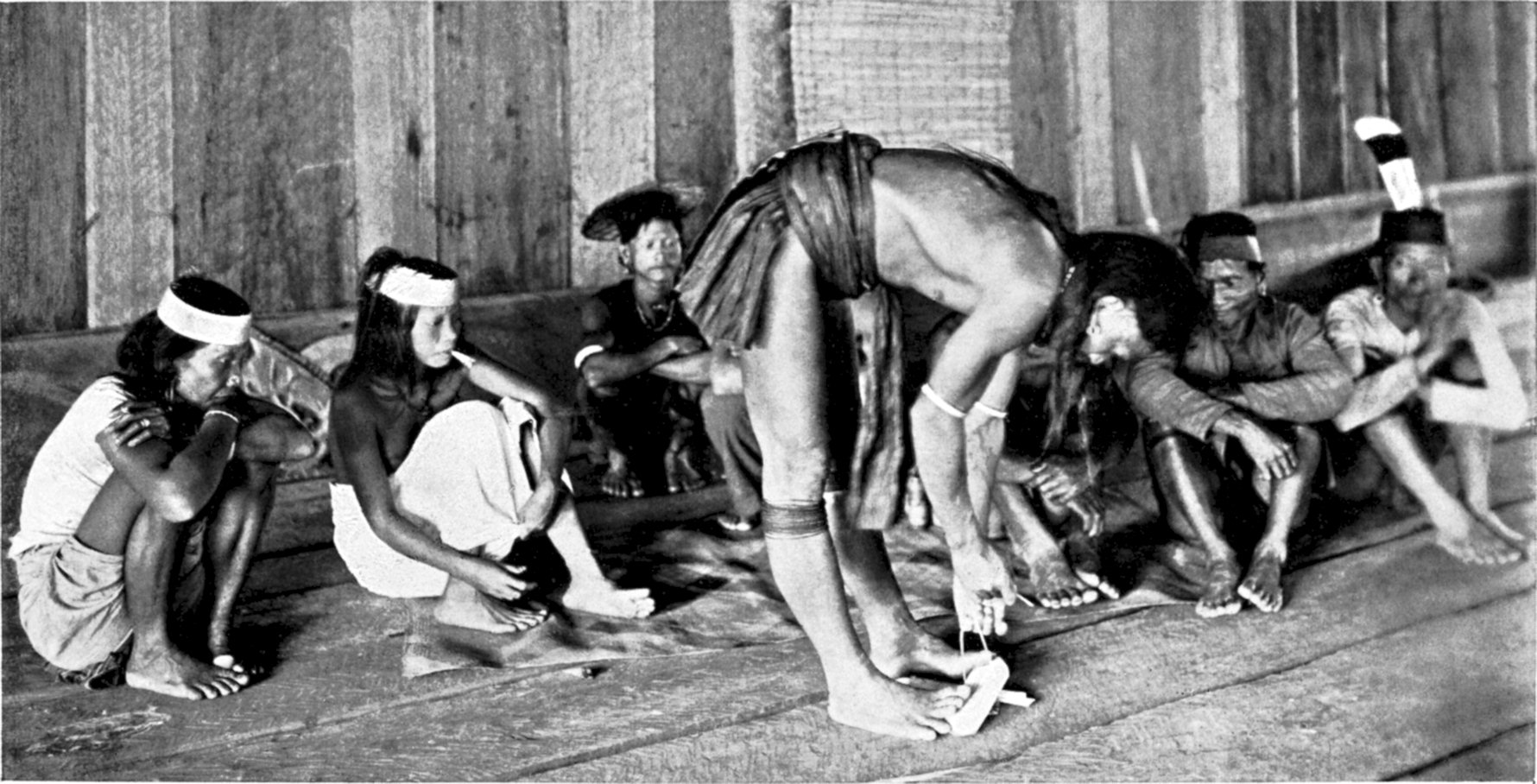
A Kayan using rattan to "saw" a piece of firewood.

A fire thong is a form of fire-saw, where a pullstring (usually wood fibre or rope) is used to saw. It is common in Southeast Asia and Oceania.

== See also ==
- Fire plough
- Hand drill
