= Glossary of firelighting =

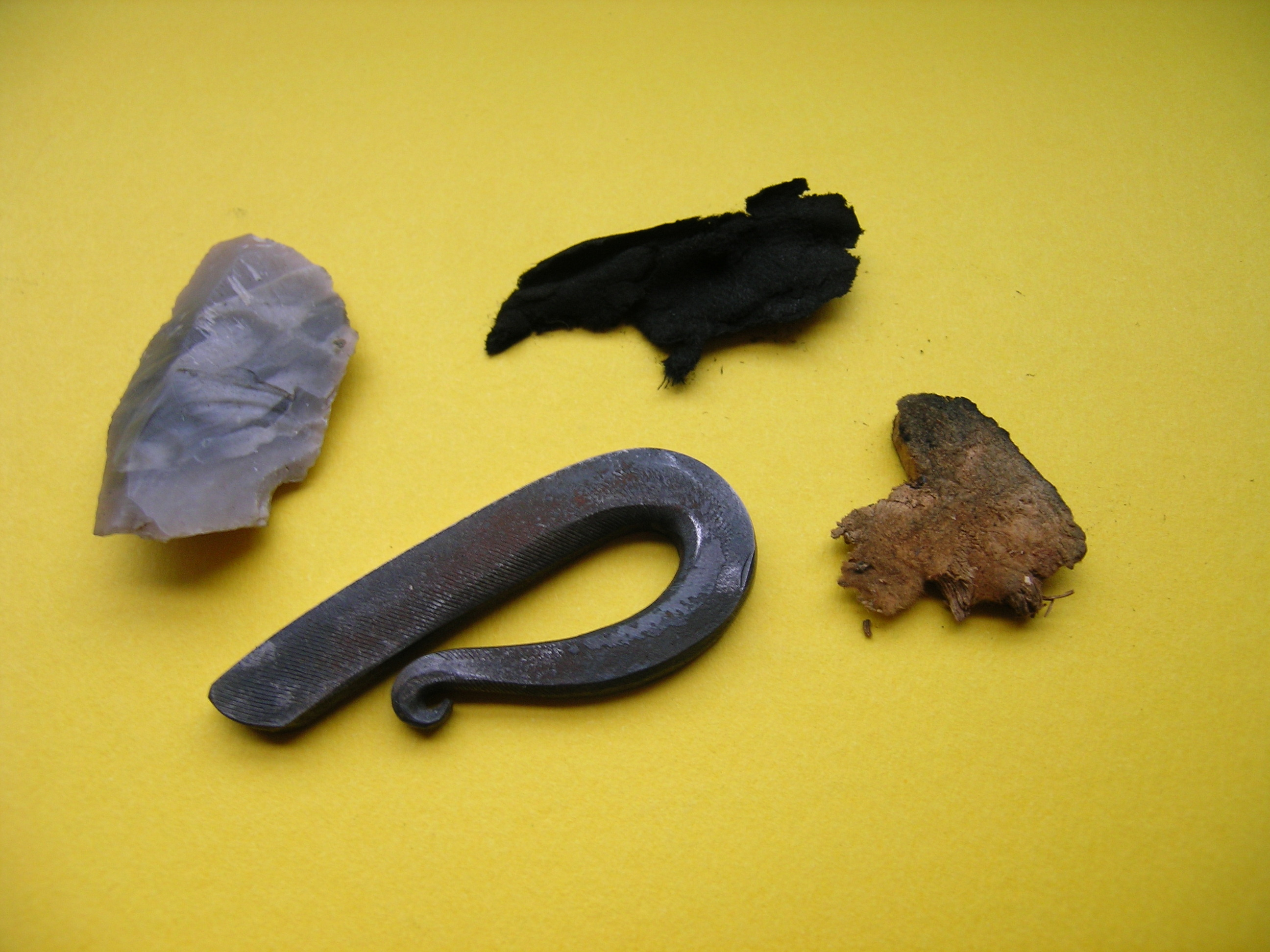
A flint, fire steel, charred cloth and piece of mushroom...

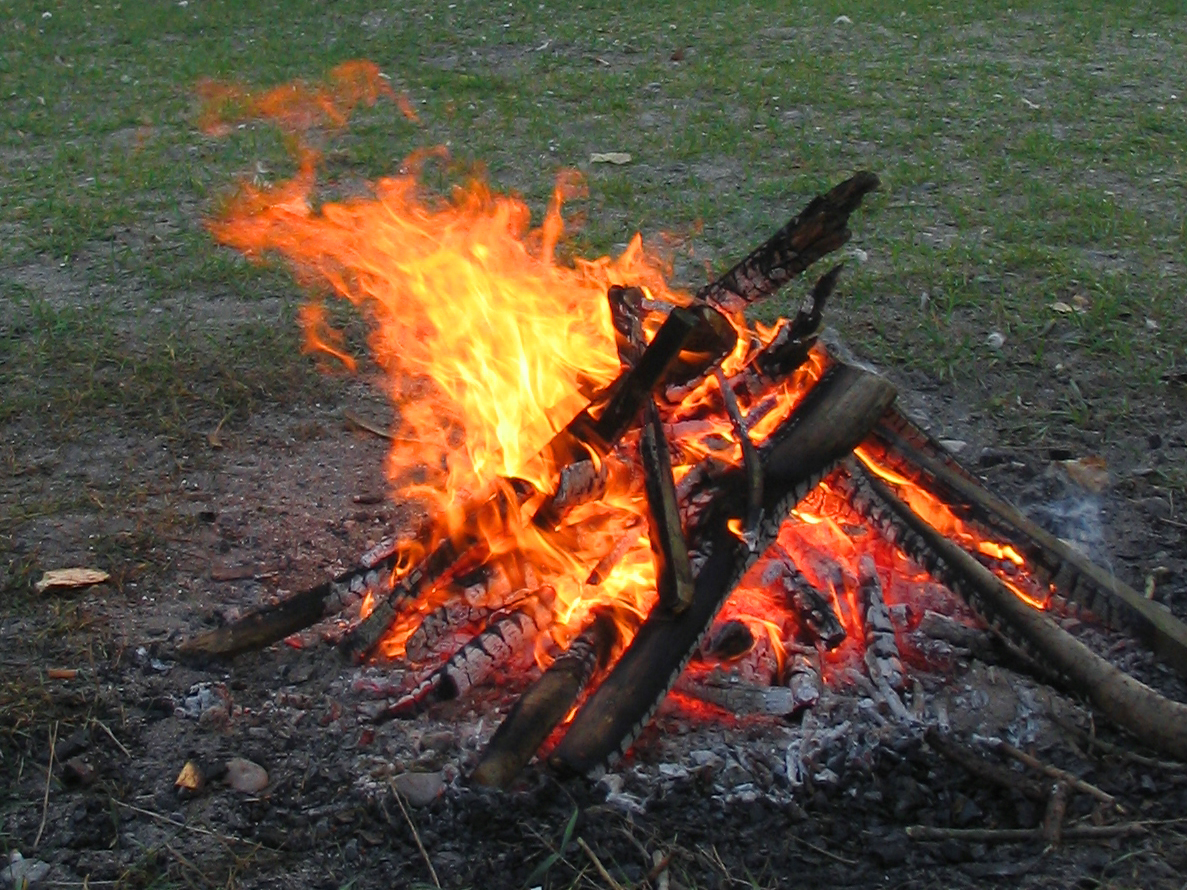
...can be used to start a campfire

This is an alphabetized glossary of terms pertaining to lighting fires, along with their definitions. Firelighting (also called firestarting, fire making, or fire craft) is the process of starting a fire artificially. Fire was an essential tool in early human cultural development. The ignition of any fire, whether natural or artificial, requires completing the fire triangle, usually by initiating the combustion of a suitably flammable material.

== A ==
amadou

A spongy, flammable substance prepared from bracket fungi.
arson

The crime of intentionally or maliciously lighting structures, wildland areas, cars or other property on fire. It is the deliberate setting of fires for personal, monetary or political gain.
auto reignition

A process used in gas burners to control ignition devices based on whether a burner flame is lit.
autoignition temperature

The lowest temperature at which a substance will spontaneously ignite in a normal atmosphere without an external source of ignition, such as a flame or spark.

== B ==
batoning

The technique of cutting or splitting wood by using a baton-sized stick or mallet to repeatedly strike the spine of a sturdy knife, chisel or blade in order to drive it through wood. The batoning method can be used to make kindling or desired forms such as boards, slats or notches. The practice is most useful for obtaining dry wood from the inside of logs for the purpose of fire making.
bellows

A device constructed to generate a strong blast of air, often as a means of supplying a fire with oxygen.
black match

In pyrotechnics, a type of crude fuse constructed of cotton string fibers intimately coated with a dried black powder slurry.
Blow George

An implement used in firelighting to increase the efficiency of firelighting through acceleration of the chimney draw.
bonfire

bow drill

An ancient tool usually used to make fire. It was also used for primitive woodworking and dentistry.
bridgewire

A relatively thin resistance wire used to set off a pyrotechnic composition serving as a pyrotechnic initiator.
Bryant and May

A United Kingdom (UK) company created in the mid-19th century specifically to make matches.

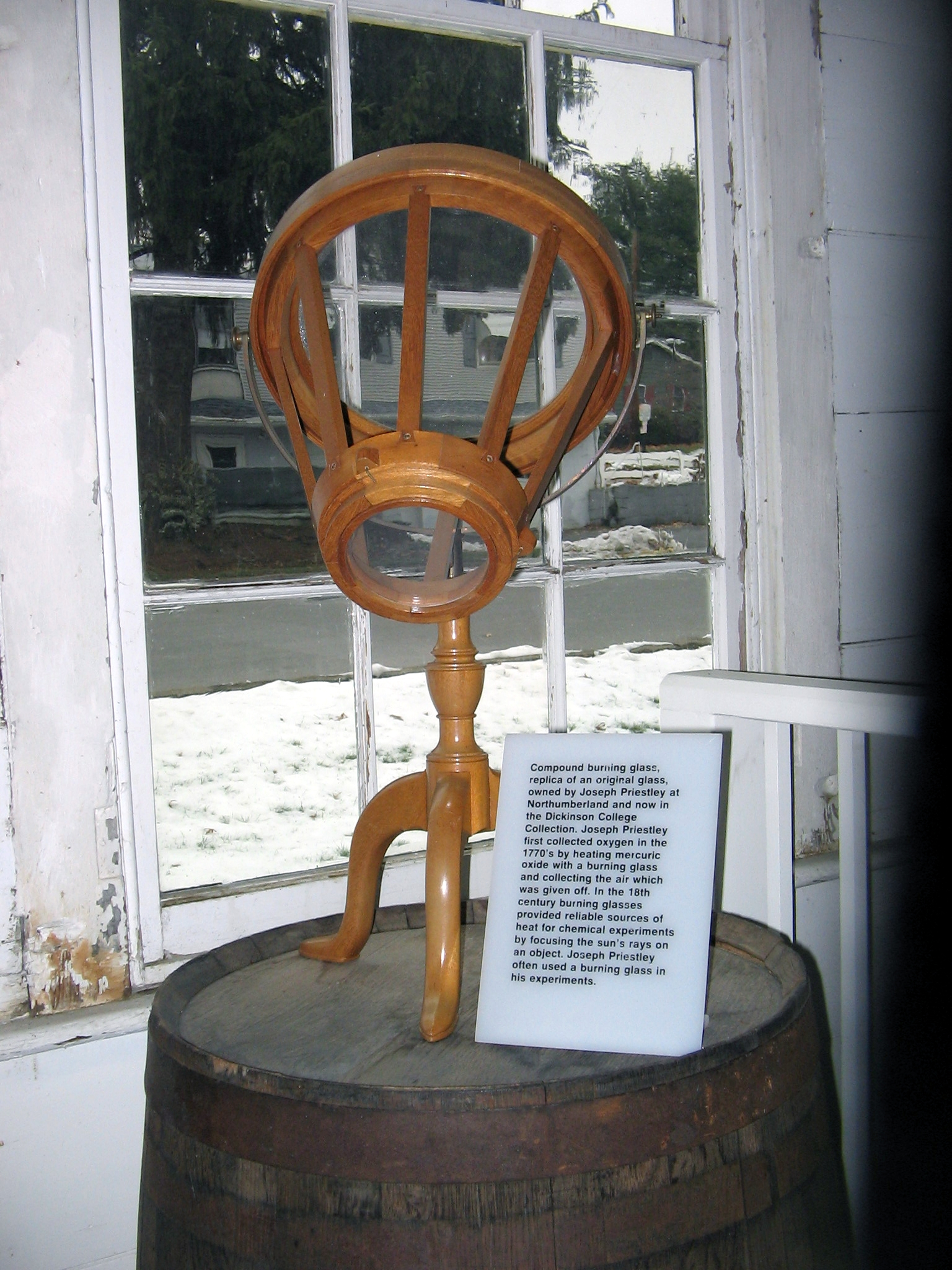
A small-scale replica of the burning lens owned by Joseph Priestley, in his laboratory

burning glass

Also called a burning lens. A large convex lens that can concentrate the Sun's rays onto a small area, heating up the area and resulting in ignition of the exposed surface.
bushfire

See wildfire.

== C ==
campfire

A fire lit at a campsite to serve as a source of light and warmth, a beacon, an insect or apex predator deterrent, for cooking, and/or for a psychological sense of security.
char cloth

A swatch of fabric made from vegetable fiber (such as linen, cotton or jute) that has been converted via pyrolysis into a slow-burning fuel of very low ignition temperature.
combustion

The sequence of exothermic chemical reactions between a fuel and an oxidant accompanied by the production of heat and conversion of chemical species. The release of heat can also result in the production of light in the form of either glowing or a flame.
control of fire by early humans

A turning point in the cultural aspect of human evolution that allowed humans to cook food and obtain warmth and protection. The ability to make fire also allowed the expansion of human activity into the colder hours of the night, and provided protection from predators and insects.

== D ==
Dickheads

A brand of matches released by Australian businessman Dick Smith in 1999. The name is a pun on the Redheads brand of matches, and on a gentle Australian term of abuse.
Döbereiner's lamp

A lighter invented in 1823 by German chemist Johann Wolfgang Döbereiner. It is based on the Fürstenberger lighter, and was in production until circa 1880. Zinc metal reacts with sulfuric acid in its jar to produce hydrogen gas. When a valve is opened, a jet of hydrogen is released and bursts into flame. The ignition is catalyzed by platinum metal.

== E ==
electric match

A device that uses an externally applied electric current to ignite a combustible compound.
ember

A hot, glowing coal made of greatly heated wood, coal, or other carbon-based material that remains after, or sometimes precedes, a fire.
England's Glory

A brand of matches, available in the United Kingdom, using an iconic image of a Victorian battleship, HMS Devastation.

== F ==
feather stick

A length of wood which has been shaved to produce a head of thin curls. It is sometimes used when starting an outdoor fire or campfire when dry tinder is difficult to find. It is often used in conjunction with char cloth.

Lighting a firelighter that uses ferrocerium to produce a spark

ferrocerium

A man-made metallic material that gives off a large number of hot sparks at temperatures of 3,000 °F (1,650 °C) when scraped against a rough surface (pyrophoricity), such as ridged steel.
fire

fire piston

A device used to kindle fire. It uses the principle of the heating of a gas (in this case air) by its rapid (adiabatic) compression to ignite a piece of tinder, which is then used to set light to kindling.
fire ring

A construction or device used to contain an otherwise unenclosed fire, such as a campfire, and prevent it from igniting objects beyond the ring and turning into a wildfire.
fire striker

Also called a firesteel. A piece of high-carbon steel used for striking a spark, usually kept in a tinderbox together with flint and tinder.

The Fire Triangle

Fire Triangle

A simple model that illustrates the three necessary ingredients needed to ignite most fires: heat, fuel, and an oxidizing agent (usually oxygen). A fire naturally occurs when all of these elements are present and combined in the right mixture, meaning that fire is actually an event rather than a thing. Most fires that can be started with these elements can also be prevented or extinguished by removing any one of the elements of the Fire Triangle.
firelighter

Also called a firestarter. A small solid fuel tablet sold as a consumer product and designed to replace kindling for the purpose of quickly and easily starting a fire.
firelighting

Also called firestarting, fire making, or fire craft. The process of igniting a fire by artificial means.
fireplace

firesteel

See fire striker.
firewood

Any wooden material that is gathered and used as fuel for a fire.
fireworks

flammability

flint

A hard, sedimentary cryptocrystalline form of the mineral quartz, categorized as a variety of chert. It occurs chiefly as nodules and masses in sedimentary rocks, such as chalks and limestones. Inside the nodule, flint is usually dark grey, black, green, white, or brown in color, and often has a glassy or waxy appearance. A thin layer on the outside of the nodules is usually different in colour, typically white and rough in texture.
flint spark lighter

A type of lighter used in many applications to safely light a gaseous fuel to start a flame. It is most commonly used to ignite bunsen burners and oxyacetylene welding torches.

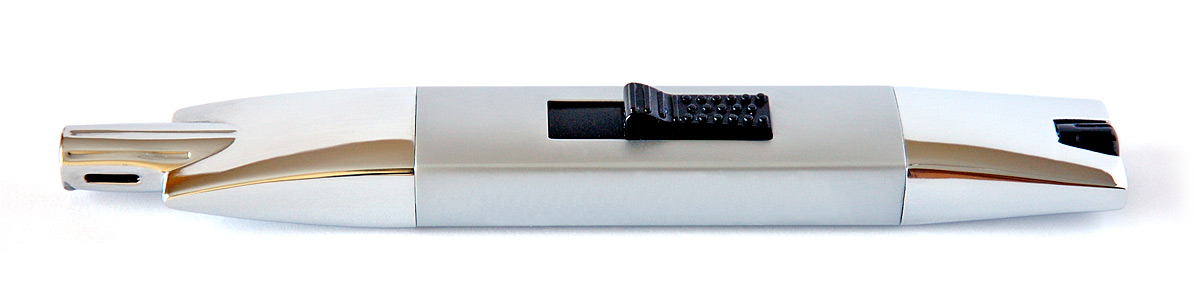
A gas wand lighter, typically used for lighting gas stoves

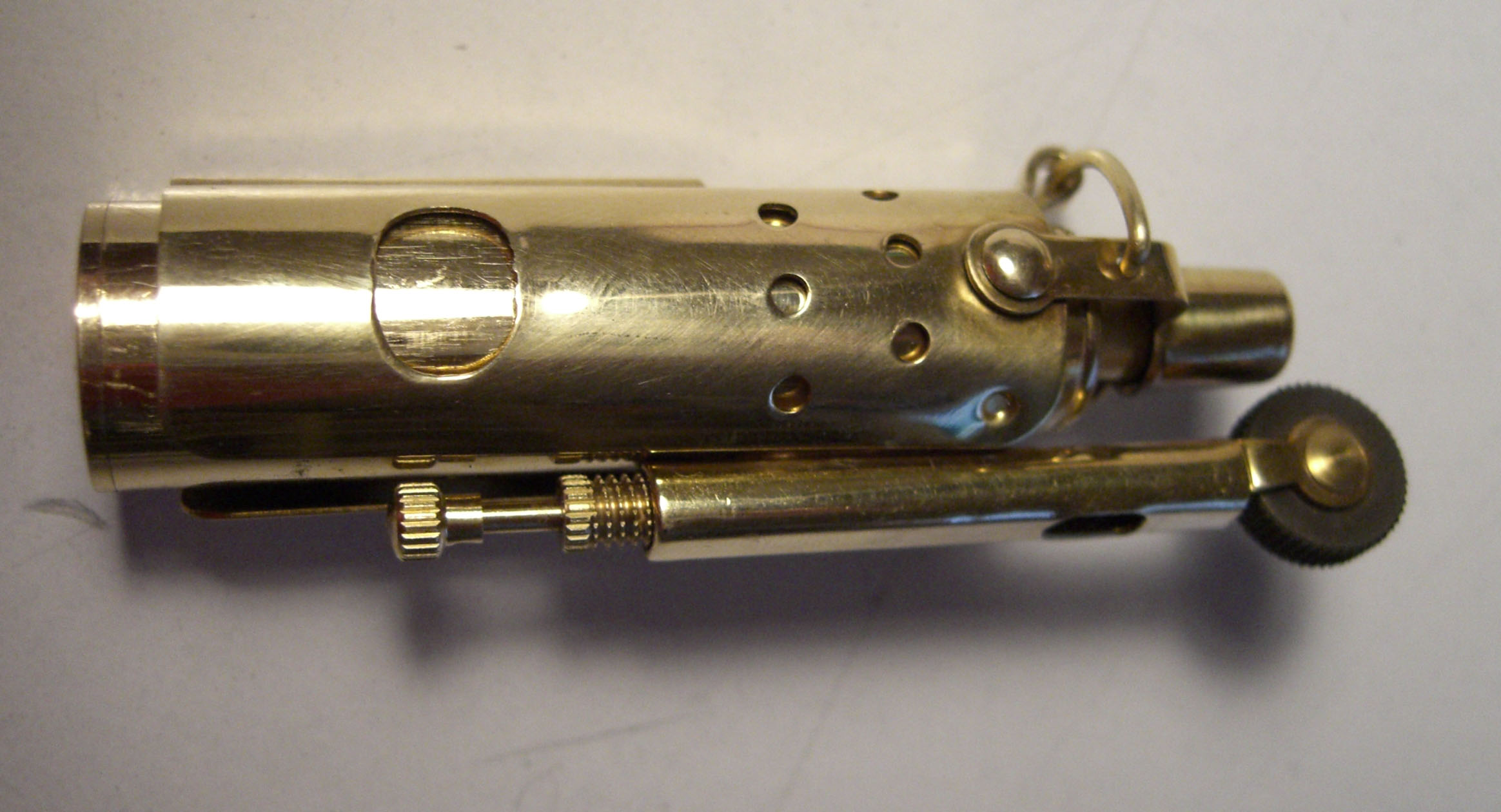
A French gasoline lighter in use during World War I

Fomes fomentarius

A species of fungal plant pathogen found in Europe, Asia, Africa and North America that is commonly used as tinder in firestarting.
fuel

Any material that stores energy which can later be extracted to perform mechanical work in a controlled manner. Most fuels used by humans undergo combustion, a redox reaction in which a combustible substance releases energy after it ignites and reacts with the oxygen in the air. Other processes used to convert fuel into energy include various other exothermic chemical reactions and nuclear reactions, such as nuclear fission or nuclear fusion.
fuse

The part of the device that initiates function

== G ==
gas lighter

A firestarting mechanism used to ignite gas stoves which do not have automatic ignition systems. It relies on a physical phenomenon called the piezoelectric effect to generate an electric spark, which ignites the combustible gas from the stove burner.
go-to-bed matchbox

A variety of match storage box that was popular in the mid-to-late 19th century. Relatively small, about 6 cm high, they were frequently made of metal of some kind, though sometimes of wood or ivory.
Guy Fawkes Night

An annual commemoration observed primarily in England on 5 November. Its history began with the events of 5 November 1605, when Guy Fawkes, a member of the Gunpowder Plot, was arrested while guarding explosives the plotters had placed beneath the House of Lords.

== L ==
Lag BaOmer

A Jewish holiday celebrated on the thirty-third day of the Counting of the Omer, which occurs on the 18th day of the Hebrew month of Iyar. A well-known custom of Lag BaOmer is the lighting of bonfires throughout Israel and worldwide wherever religious Jews can be found.
lighter

Any portable device used to generate a flame. It consists of a metal or plastic container filled with a flammable fluid or pressurized liquid gas, a means of ignition, and some provision for extinguishing the flame.
Lucifer

Early matches that had a number of problems: an initial violent reaction, an unsteady flame, and unpleasant odor and fumes. Lucifers could ignite explosively, sometimes throwing sparks a considerable distance.

== M ==
match

A typical modern match is made of a small wooden stick or stiff paper. One end is coated with a material that can be ignited by frictional heat generated by striking the match against a suitable surface.

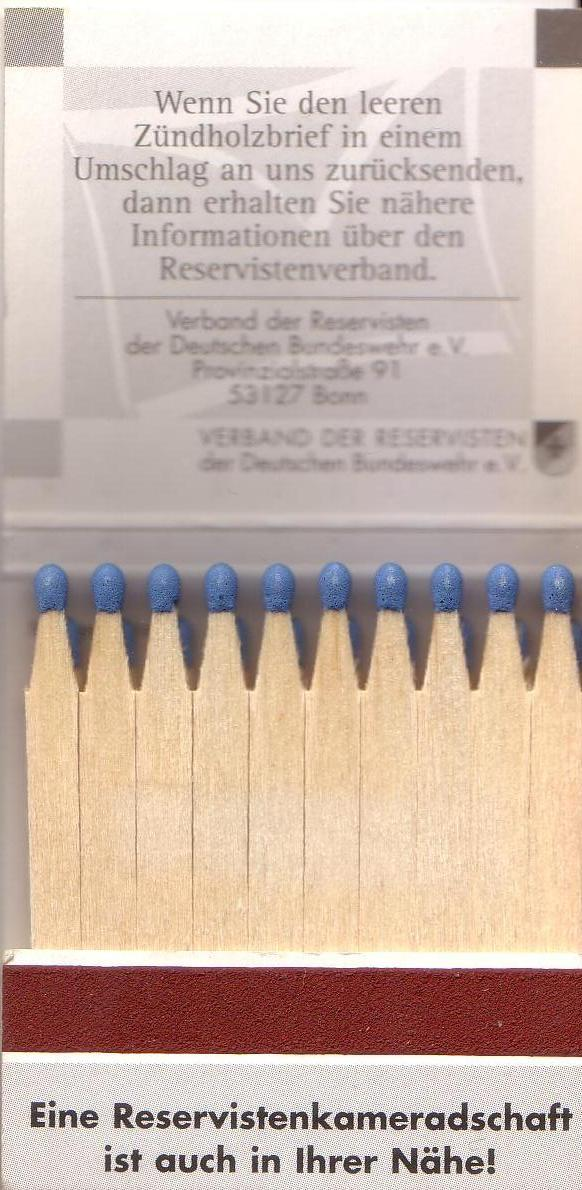
An open matchbook

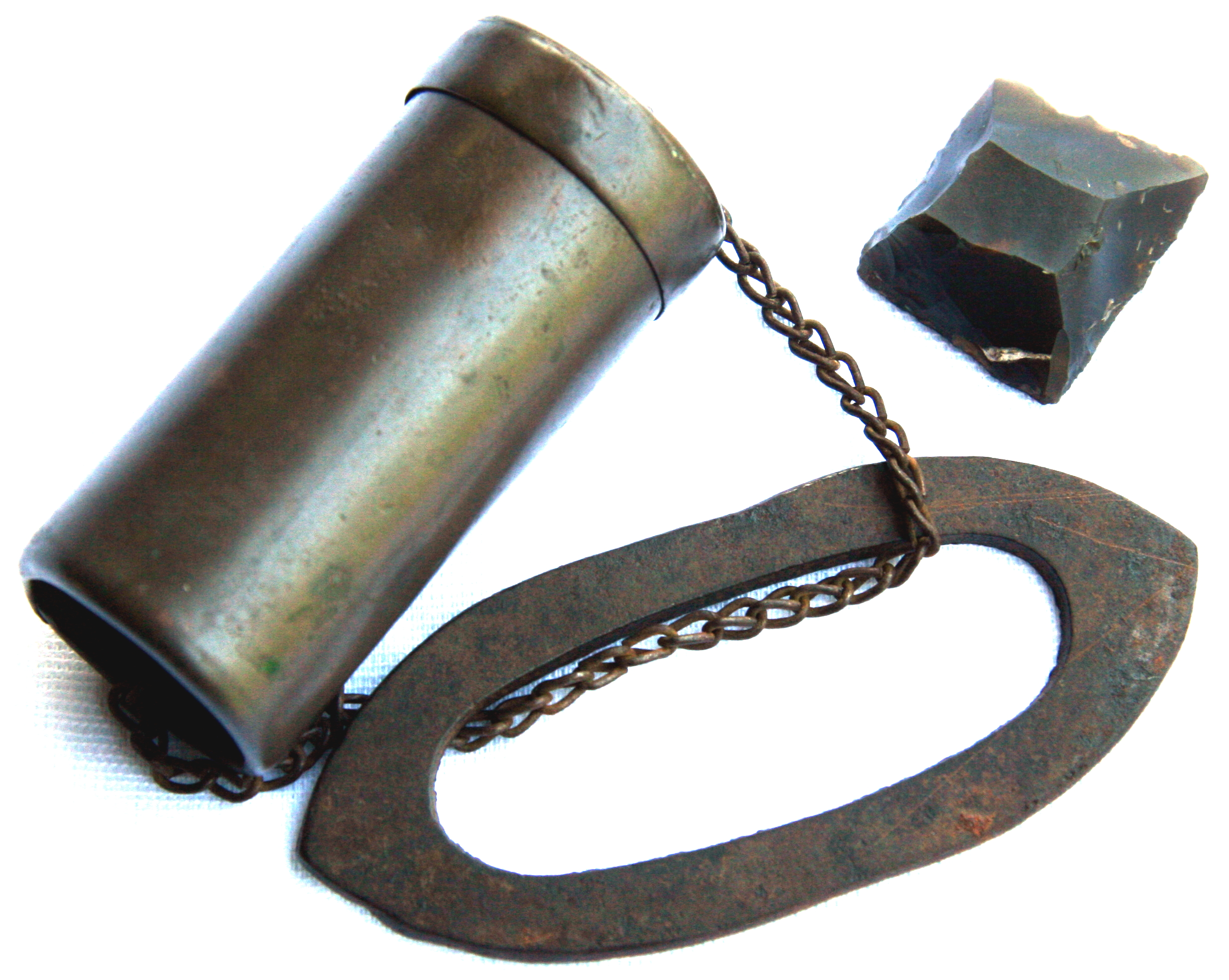
A tinderbox (approx. 3 in (7.6 cm) in length) with firesteel and flint

matchbook

A small paperboard folder (matchcover) enclosing a quantity of matches and having a coarse striking surface on the exterior.
matchbox

A box made of cardboard or thin wood designed to hold matches.

== N ==
Native American use of fire

Pre-Columbian Native Americans used fire in many and significant ways, including cooking, protecting an area from fire and for landscape-altering to clear prairie land.
nichrome

Among its various uses, nichrome is also used in the explosives and fireworks industries as a bridgewire in electric ignition systems, such as electric matches and model rocket igniters.
novelty lighter

Lighters in the shape of objects that may have audio or visual effects, and oftentimes look like toys. Novelty lighters have been banned in some areas.

== P ==
piezo ignition

A type of ignition that is used in portable camping stoves, gas grills, some lighters, and potato guns.
potassium permanganate

Sometimes included in survival kits as a fire starter, water sterilizer and for creating distress signals on snow.
punk

A smoldering stick used for lighting firework fuses.
pyrite

A common sulfide mineral which had brief popularity in the 16th and 17th centuries as a source of ignition in early firearms, most notably the wheellock, where the cock held a lump of pyrite against a circular file to strike the sparks needed to fire the gun.
pyrokinesis

The name coined by horror novelist Stephen King for the ability to create or to control fire with the mind that he gave to the protagonist Charlie McGee in Firestarter.
pyromania

An impulse control disorder in which individuals repeatedly fail to resist impulses to deliberately start fires, in order to relieve tension or for instant gratification.
pyrotechnics

== R ==
Redheads

An iconic Australian brand of matches originally manufactured in Richmond, Victoria by Bryant and May but now manufactured in Sweden by Swedish Match. It is the top-selling brand in the country.
Ronson

A producer of lighters and lighter accessories once known for its stylish and dependable cigarette lighter line, and the advertising slogan, "You're a winner - with a Ronson!" The Ronson brand is now owned by Zippo Manufacturing Company.

== S ==
slow match

The very slow burning cord or twine fuse used by early gunpowder musketeers, artillerymen, and soldiers to ignite matchlock muskets, cannons, and petards.
smoulder

The slow, low-temperature, flameless form of combustion, sustained by the heat evolved when oxygen directly attacks the surface of a condensed-phase fuel.
sodium permanganate

Chemically similar to potassium permanganate, but generally less desirable because it is more expensive to produce.
Solar Spark Lighter

A pocket-sized stainless steel parabolic mirror, shaped to concentrate sunlight on a small prong holding combustible material at the focal point.
Swan Vesta

A brand name for the most popular brand of 'strike-anywhere' matches currently available in the United Kingdom.

== T ==
tinder

Any easily combustible material used to ignite fires by rudimentary methods. A small fire consisting of tinder is then used to ignite kindling.
tinderbox

A small container containing flint, firesteel, and tinder (typically char cloth but sometimes a small quantity of dry, finely-divided fibrous matter such as straw), used together to help kindle a fire. Tinderboxes fell out of general usage when matches were invented.

== V ==
vesta case

A small portable box made in a great variety of forms with snapshut covers to contain vestas (short matches) and keep them dry.

== W ==
wildfire

Also called a wildland fire, forest fire, or bushfire.
wilful fire raising

A Common Law offence under Scots Law applicable to the destruction of property or possessions by fire. See also arson.
wood ash

The residue powder left after the combustion of wood. The main producers of wood ash are wood industries and power plants.
wood fuel

Any wood that is used as fuel for a fire. The burning of wood is currently the largest use of energy derived from a solid fuel biomass.

== Z ==
Zip cube

A small, packaged block of solid fuel containing kerosene and sold as a firelighter.
Zippo

A refillable metal lighter manufactured by Zippo Manufacturing Company of Bradford, Pennsylvania, United States. Thousands of different styles and designs have been made in the eight decades since their introduction, including military ones for specific regiments.
