= Glede =

Glede may refer to:

- Ember
- Kite (bird)
