= Fire making =

Process of starting a fire artificially

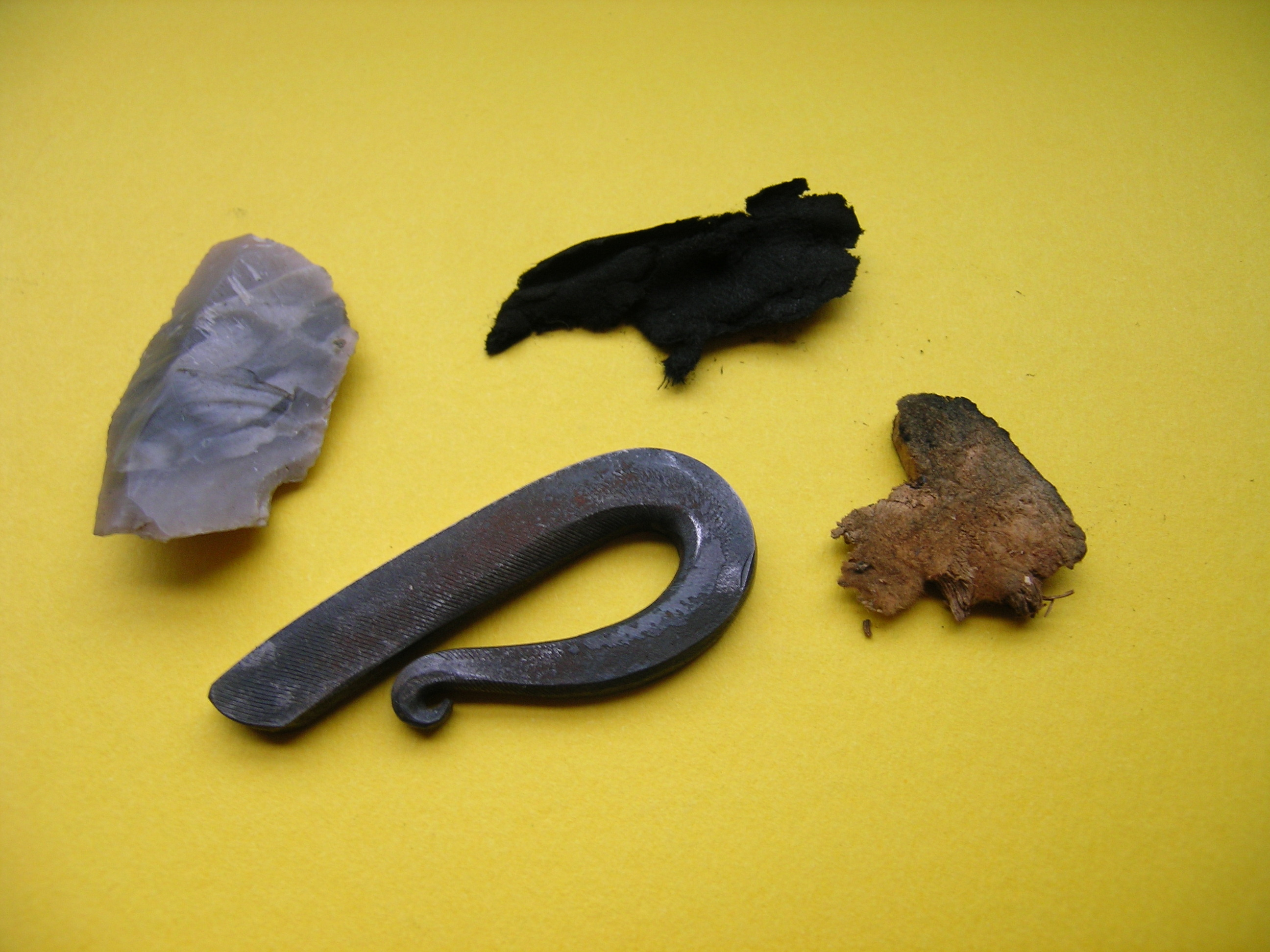
Typical contents of a tinder box. From left to right: flint, fire striker, char cloth and piece of mushroom.

Fire making, fire lighting or fire craft is the process of artificially starting a fire. It requires completing the fire triangle, usually by heating tinder above its autoignition temperature.

Fire is an essential tool for human survival and the use of fire was important in early human cultural history since the Lower Paleolithic. Today, it is a key component of Scouting, woodcraft and bushcraft.

== Archaeology ==
The earliest evidence for fire-making dates to about 400,000 years ago at a Neanderthal site in eastern England where burnt soil was found along with fire-cracked flint handaxes and two fragments of iron pyrite, used to strike sparks with flint. The next oldest evidence comes from around 50,000 years ago and later, when evidence for fire making can be found in dozens of Neanderthal hand axes from France exhibiting use-wear traces suggesting these tools were struck with the mineral pyrite to produce sparks. At the Neolithic site of La Draga, researchers have found that fungi were used as tinder. Hearths are one of the most common features found at archaeological sites. Ötzi, a well-preserved natural mummy of a man who lived in the Ötztal Alps between 3400 and 3100 BCE, carried material to make a fire (tinder fungus along with flint and pyrite for creating sparks).

== Material ==
Fires start from increasing tinder's temperature until it combusts. Tinder is a material that combusts first (as an ember or flame) and in doing so heats other material (heavier tinder, twigs, kindling, etc.) until it burns (as a flame). Fine tinder is characterized by its ability to combust from a spark, friction, or other action from the below methods.

Many forms of tinder are available: charcloth is preferred by many, while tinder fungus and other species such as Phellinus igniarius have been used as firestarter. Most friction methods using wood generate their own fine tinder. A pile of magnesium or ferrocerium shavings is common, and a moisture-resistant DIY tinder features cotton balls impregnated with petroleum jelly. A feather stick can be made from available branches or twigs with a knife.

Autoignition temperatures of common tinder:

Substance	Autoignition	Note
Wood	300–482 °C (572–900 °F)	
Charcoal	349 °C (660 °F)	
Peat	227 °C (441 °F)	
Cotton fibers	455 °C (851 °F)	
Paper	218–246 °C (424–475 °F)	
Petroleum	400 °C (752 °F)	
Leather / parchment	200–212 °C (392–414 °F)	
Magnesium	473 °C (883 °F)	

Tinder is preserved within a tinderbox, which may be just a plastic bag.

Tinder, when formed into a tight bundle, can also be used to preserve/carry an ember. Often in the form of a cigar and made of compacted tinder materials held within a tinderbox, a smouldering ember could safely be saved inside.

== Methods ==
=== Natural occurrences ===
Fire occurs naturally as a result of volcanic activity, meteorites, and lightning strikes. Many animals are aware of fire and adapt their behavior to it. Plants, too, have adapted to the natural occurrence of fire. Thus, humans encountered and were aware of fire, and later its beneficial uses, long before they could make fire on demand. The first and easiest way to make a fire would have been to use the hot ashes or burning wood from a forest or grass fire, and then to keep the fire or coals going for as long as possible by adding more combustible material.

=== Friction ===
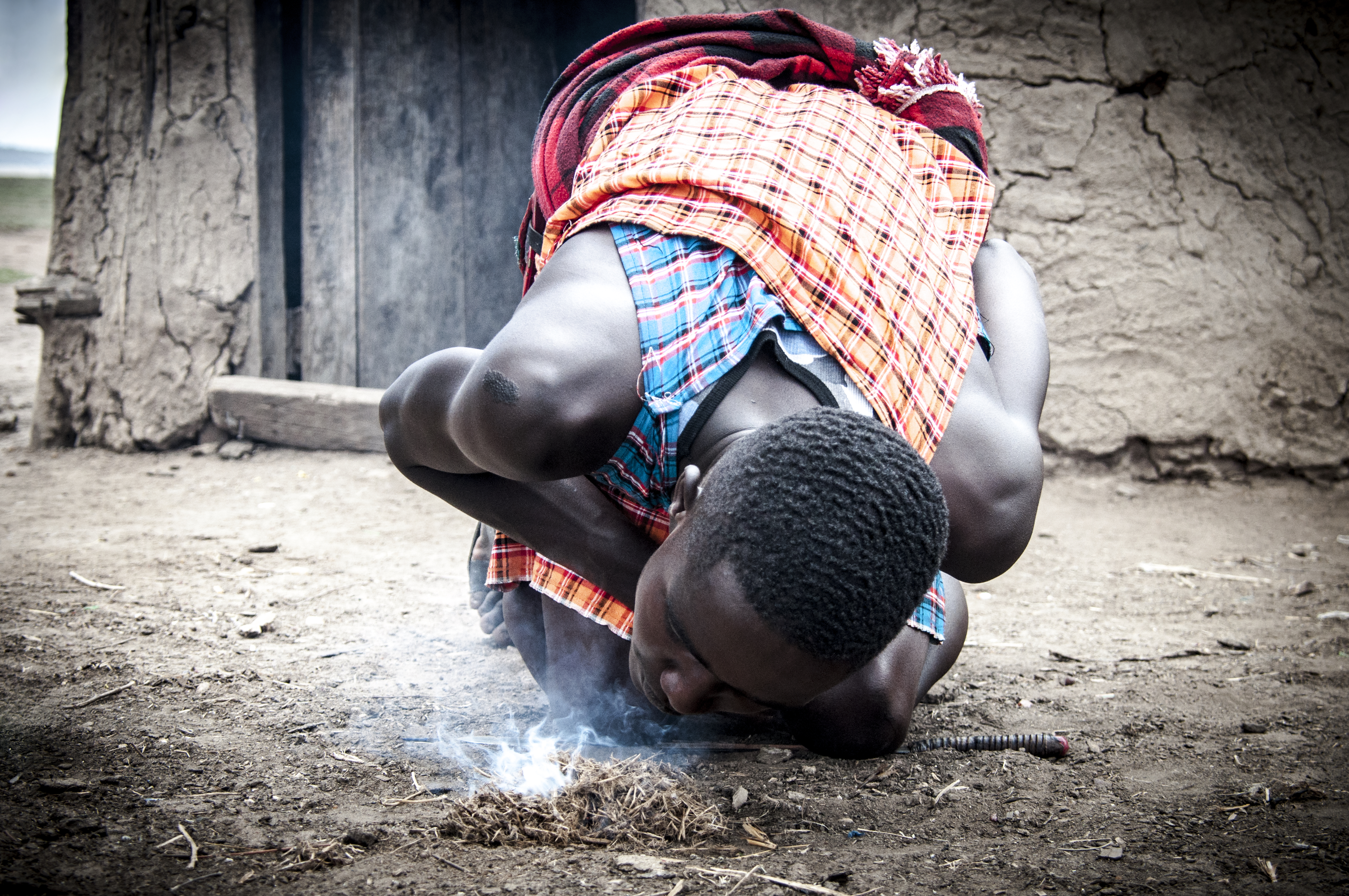
Maasai warrior lighting a fire, blowing on it to add oxygen that encourages the fire to spread

Fire can be created through friction by rapidly grinding pieces of solid combustible material (such as wood) against each other (or a hard surface) which are heated and create an ember. Successfully creating fire by friction involves skill, fitness, knowledge, and acceptable environmental conditions. Some techniques involve crafting a system of interlocking pieces that give the practitioner an improved mechanical advantage; these techniques require more skill and knowledge but less fitness, and work in less ideal conditions. Once hot enough, the ember is introduced to the tinder, more oxygen is added by blowing and the result is ignition.

The hand drill is the most widespread among indigenous cultures, characterized by the use of a thin, straightened wooden shaft or reed to be spun with the hands, grinding within a notch against the soft wooden base of a fire board (a wooden board with a carved notch in which to catch heated wood fibers created by friction). This repeated spinning and downward pressure causes black dust to form in the notch of the fireboard, eventually creating a hot, glowing coal. The coal is then carefully placed among dense, fine tinder, which is pressed against it as one blows directly onto the coal until the tinder begins burning and eventually catches into flame. The advantage of the hand drill technique is that it requires no rope.

The bow drill uses the same principle as the hand drill (friction by rotation of wood on wood) but the spindle is shorter, wider (about the size of a human thumb) and driven by a bow, which allows longer, easier strokes and protects the palms. Additional downward pressure is generated by the handhold.

A pump drill is a variant of the bow drill that uses a coiled rope around a cross-section of wooden stake spin the shaft by pumping up and down a cross-member.

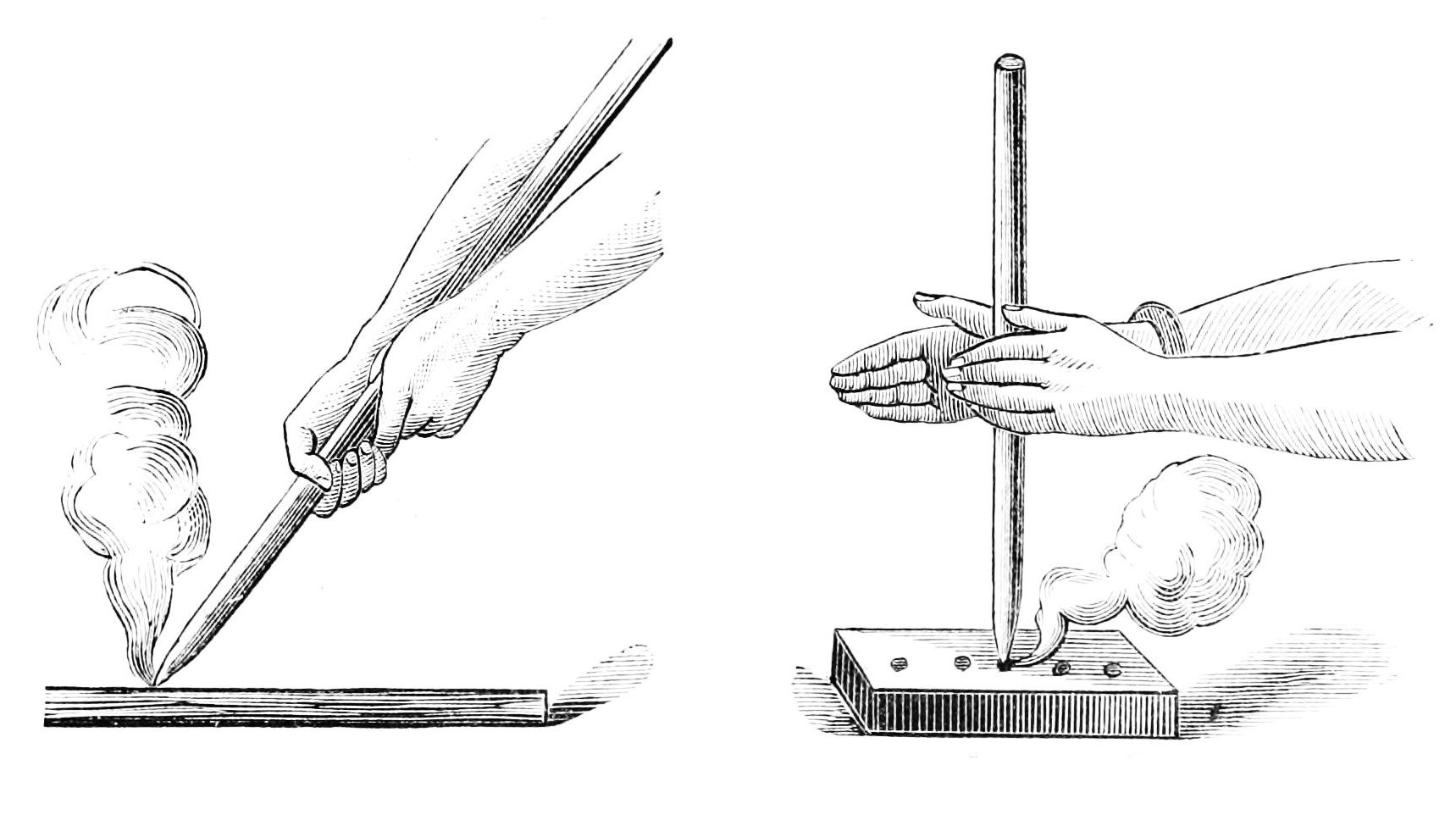
A fire plough (left), as opposed to a hand drill (right)

The fire plough or fireplow consists of a stick cut to a dull point, and a long piece of wood with a groove cut down its length. The stake is pressed down hard and rubbed quickly against the groove of the second piece in a "plowing" motion, to produce hot dust which creates an ember. A split is often made down the length of the grooved piece, so that oxygen can flow freely to the coal/ember.

A fire-saw is a method by which a piece of wood is sawed through a notch in a second piece or pieces to generate friction. The tinder may be placed between two slats of wood with the third piece or "saw" drawn over them above the tinder so as to catch a coal, but there is more than one configuration.

A fire thong uses a non-melting cord, ratan, or flexible strip of wood to 'saw' the wood creating friction. On the board, opposite the cord, is a well with a hole through the board to gather the charred, soon-to-smoke, wood dust.

The Rudiger roll friction fire method, also known as the "fire roll" method, is believed to have been invented by World War 2 POWs. A German survival expert named Rüdiger Nehberg wrote about this method in one of his books. A small amount of wood ash is rolled up in a piece of cotton (or other fibrous biological material) like a cigar. The material is then placed between two boards and rolled back and forth. Pressure and speed are both gradually increased. With proper technique ignition can occur in seconds. The wood ash is likely to be a catalyst in lowering the ignition temperature of the biological materials.

=== Percussion ===
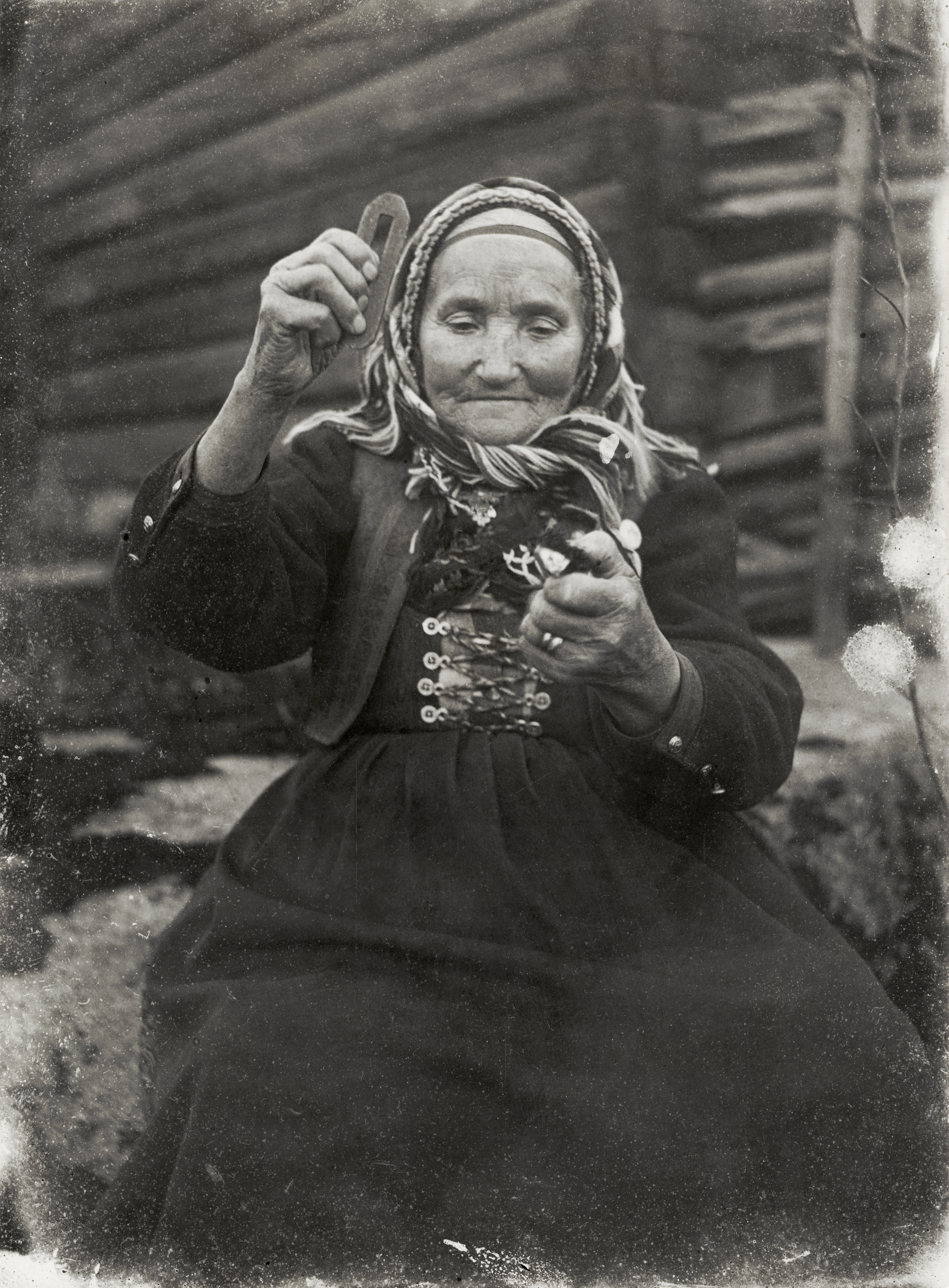
Firesteel and flint used in Dalarna, Sweden in 1916.

A fire striker or firesteel when hit by a hard, glassy stone such as quartz, jasper, agate or flint cleaves small, hot, oxidizing metal particles that can ignite tinder. The steel should be high carbon, non-alloyed, and hardened. Similarly, two pieces of iron pyrite or marcasite when struck together can create sparks.

The use of flint in particular became the most common method of producing flames in pre-industrial societies. Travelers up to the late 19th century would often use self-contained kits known as tinderboxes to start fires.

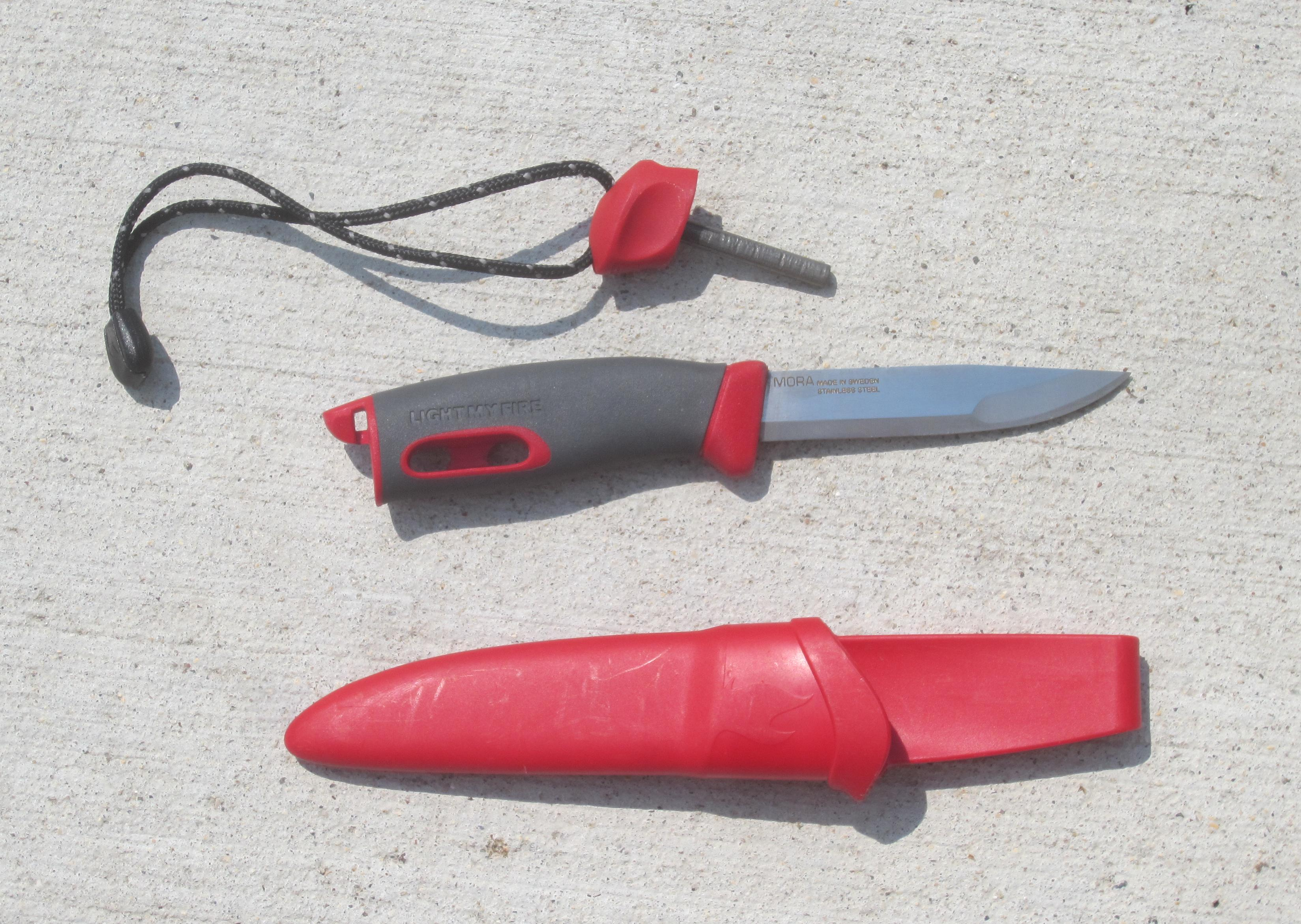
This Mora camping knife has a ferrocerium rod stored in the handle, which can be used to make sparks to ignite tinder.

Some fire-starting systems use a ferrocerium rod and a hard scraper to create hot sparks by manually scratching the ferro rod with a knife or sharp object to ignite man-made or natural tinder. Fire starters based upon ferrocerium are popular with Woodcraft practitioners, bushcraft hobbyists and survivalists. Similar sparking devices have a built-in striking blade which provides an easy method for sparking with one hand. Another common type has the ferro rod attached to a magnesium bar that can be scraped with a knife to make a powdered tinder that will burn for a few seconds.

Hiking stores sell both magnesium starters, firelighter blocks, and other specialist tinder.

==== Lighters ====
Lighters typically use a percussion-type sparking device to ignite gaseous or liquid fuels such as butane, naphtha, or gasoline. These are simple to light, often using a wheel mechanism that when spun with the thumb creates friction on the internal rod of ferrocerium "flint" and throws a shower of white-hot sparks into the gas or wick. Alternately, an electric spark ignites the fuel. With almost 2 billion lighters sold each year, this is the most popular means to light fires today.

=== Compression of air ===
A fire piston ignites a combustible substance by rapid compression of air. Similar to how a diesel engine works, rapid compression of air heats the interior to 400 to 700 °C (750 to 1,290 °F), well above the tinder's autoignition temperature. Tinder that holds an ember such as charcloth must be used. After compression, the piston is opened quickly and the ember is transferred to a larger pile of tinder.

=== Solar ===
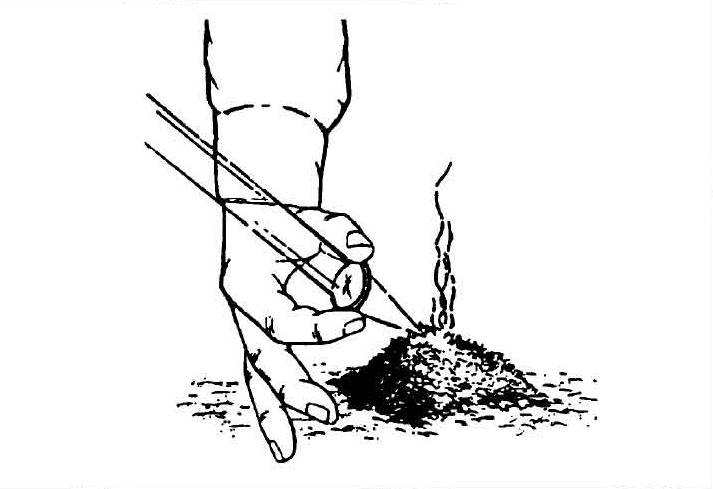
Starting a fire with a lens

Sunlight can be concentrated using a lens (such as a burning glass) to focus the energy from the sun onto tinder. A concave mirror can also concentrate the sun's rays onto tinder.

=== Chemical ===
An exothermic chemical reaction can generate enough heat as to catch itself or tinder on fire. Matches are small sticks of wood or stiff paper with a coating that undergoes an exothermic reaction when triggered by friction.

Other reactions that can be used to start fires include:

- calcium hypochlorite and automotive brake fluid
- potassium permanganate and glycerin
- potassium permanganate, acetone, and sulfuric acid
- sodium chlorate, sugar, and sulfuric acid
- ammonium nitrate powder, finely ground zinc powder, and hydrochloric acid
- sulfuric acid, zinc, and platinum (as in Döbereiner's lamp)
- Percussion caps, as used in muzzleloader firearms, and primers used in rifle and shotgun shells create a stream of sparks when rapidly struck.

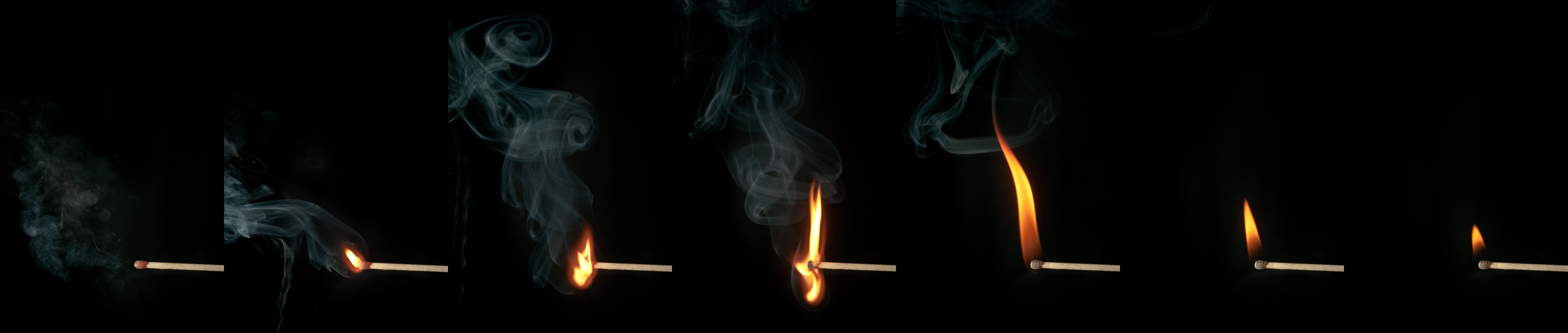
Match—in the first second after strike

=== Electrical ===
Electrical firemaking involves the contact of an electrically heated object to tinder. A current is run through the object until it is red hot, like the burners on an electric stove, and it is brought into contact with the tinder, lighting it. For example, a foil-paper chewing gum wrapper will heat-up and ignite, or a flashlight battery coming into contact with a thin wire mesh (such as steel wool) may produce enough heat to ignite charcloth or other tinder. Larger batteries can generate sparks when their leads touch.

A surface silicon carbide igniter becomes red hot when connected to electricity, thus igniting gaseous fuels that enter into contact with the igniter. High voltage can be used to create sparks as in spark plugs which has the same effect on gaseous fuels and fuel and air mixtures such as those found in gasoline internal combustion engines.

== See also ==
- Firestarter (disambiguation)
- Glossary of firelighting
- Need-fire
- Quest for Fire (film)
