= Fire plough =

Firelighting tool

A fire plough in Vanuatu.

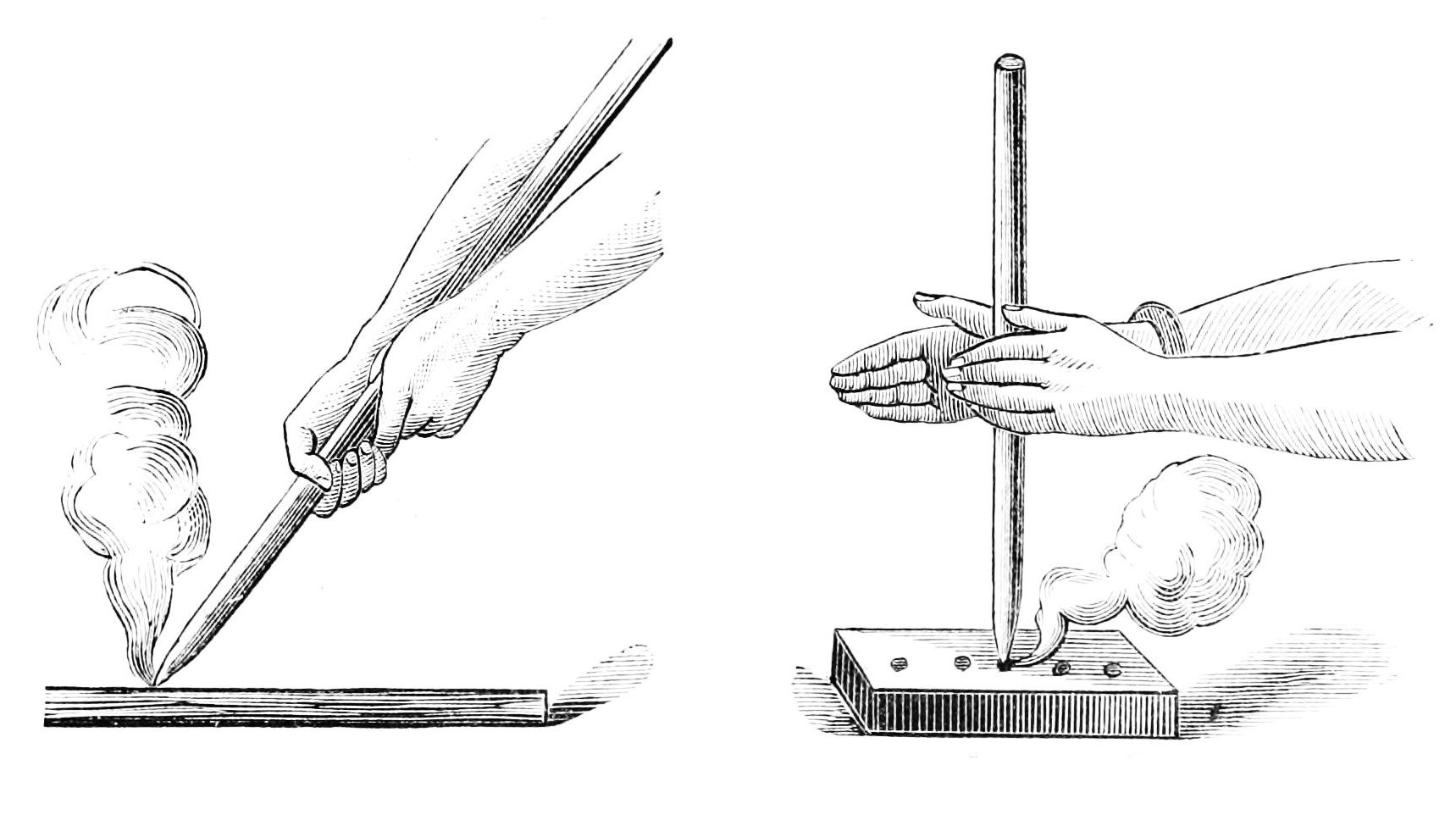
A fire plough (left), as opposed to a hand drill (right).

A fire plough (or fire plow) is a firelighting tool. In its simplest form, it is two sticks rubbed together. Rubbing produces friction and heat, and eventually an ember. More advanced are "stick-and-groove" forms, which typically uses a V-shaped base piece of wood, and a "friction stick" as the activator.

The typical fire plough consists of a stick cut to a dull point, and a long piece of wood with a groove cut down its length. The point of the first piece is rubbed quickly through the groove of the second piece in a "plowing" motion, to produce hot dust that then becomes a coal. A split is often made down the length of the grooved piece, so that oxygen can flow freely to the coal/ember. Once hot enough, the coal is introduced to the tinder, more oxygen is added by blowing and the result is ignition.
