= Hand drill =

Firemaking device

Hand drill and hearthboard
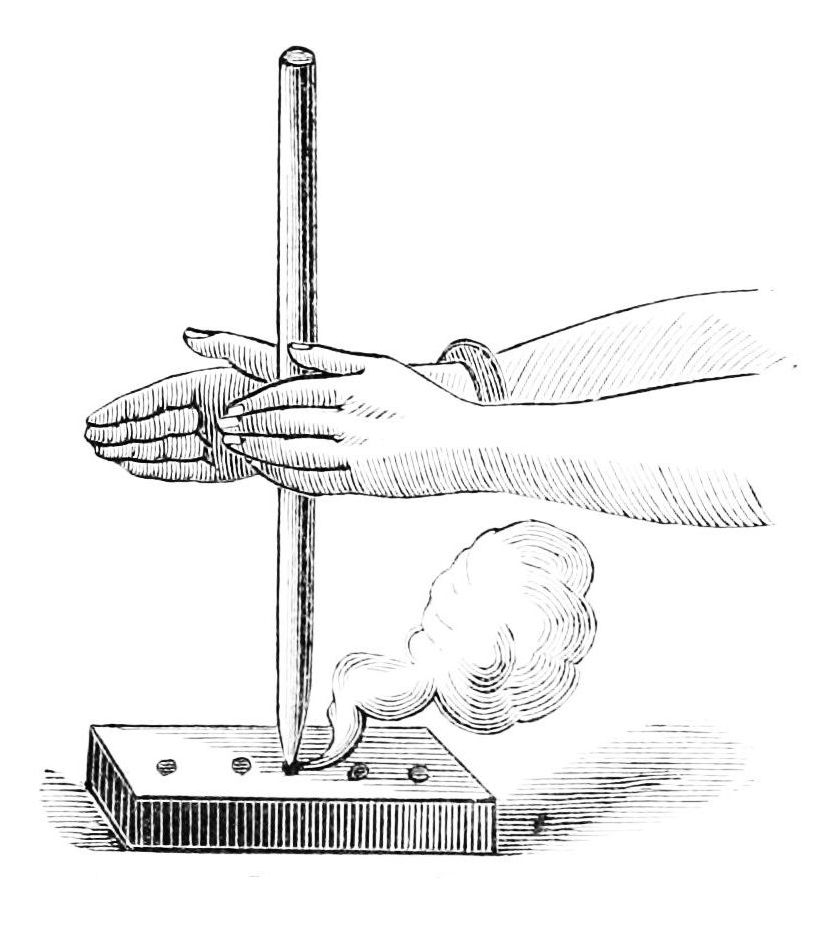
- A traditional two-piece friction fire-making apparatus.
- Classification: Friction fire ignition
- Inventor: Prehistoric
- Related: Bow drill, Pump drill, Fire-lighting

A hand drill is the simplest primitive method to produce rapid rotary motion of a rod. It consists in holding the rod vertically between both hands and moving these back and forth, in opposite directions, as in rubbing them. The rod typically is one or two feet long and half an inch in diameter.

Hand drills have been used by many primitive societies as a fire drill to start a fire. It is still often learned as a useful survival skill. A hand drill could also be used as a tool for drilling holes in hard materials such as wood, stone, or bone.

For either use, the hands must also exert downward pressure while spinning the rod. As a result, the hands drift down the rod, and must be periodically raised to the top again. These interruptions can be avoided by cutting a notch at the top of the shaft, tying a cord through it, and then inserting the thumbs through loops in the cord. However, skilled operators can either maintain pressure with their hands almost stationary vertically; or, in a movement comparable to floating, can "float" their hands back to the top of the drill.

== See also ==
- Bow drill
- Pump drill
- Brace (tool)
