= La Draga =

Iberian Neolithic archaeological site

La Draga is an Early Neolithic lakeshore site (last quarter of the 6th millennium BCE) located in Banyoles (Catalunya, Spain) and it is the only prehistoric lacustrine site of the Iberian Peninsula. Excavations allowed the identification of two different Early Neolithic phases of occupation, though no change in the technical tradition (or cultural material) has been recorded between the two phases.

Since its discovery in 1990 there have been a series of later excavations and studies held by different Spanish institutions such as the Museu Arqueològic Comarcal de Banyoles (MACB), the Consejo Superior de Investigaciones Científicas (CSIC), the Universitat Autónoma de Barcelona (UAB), the Museu d'Arqueologia de Catalunya (MAC) and the Centre d'Arqueologia Subaquàtica de Catalunya (CASC). Those later excavations uncovered some wooden bows which are believed to be the oldest Neolithic bows of Europe.

From an archaeological perspective La Draga has been of a particular interest because of the well preserved waterlogged organic material (bones, wooden remains, fibres, textile, seeds, leaves, mushrooms) retrieved from excavations that allowed for a clearer understanding of the past environment and past social dynamics of this region. Such discoveries would not have been possible without the aquatic/phreatic environment, as is evident from the terrestrial area of the site, where such findings were not found, besides from bone and ceramics.

== Geography of the surrounding area ==
Banyoles' lake is located at 170 m of altitude, and it is of Karstic origin, it is mainly filled by groundwater and was originally drained on the eastern shore by small artificial channels that pour their waters into the river, which today is called Terri. This river was responsible for the development of a humid area in the northeastern shore, where the area of La Draga is located.

La Draga is about 50 km from Pyrenees and 35 km from the current Mediterranean Sea, and it was first discovered and excavated in 1990, it is believed to cover a surface of almost 15.000 m², some of which are submerged in the lake of Banyoles. This area, during Neolithic occupations, had the shape of a peninsula which sloped towards the lake. Constant humidity and anoxic/waterlogged conditions of the site allowed the preservation of several types of archaeological organic remains, making La Draga a site of remarkable interest for Neolithic European studies, especially in the Mediterranean basin, where these sites are exceptional.

== Discovery and archaeological excavations ==
La Draga was discovered during preventive archaeological excavations led in 1990 by the Museu Arqueològic Comarcal de Banyoles. This first excavation revealed that the site was an Early Neolithic Cardial settlement likely occupied from the end of the 6th millennium BC.

Two main seasons of archaeological excavation can be identified at La Draga.The first (1991-2005) focused on three areas including the waterlogged sector C (sector A, B and C), while the second (2008-2015) revealed a new section adjacent to sector B (sector D) and new areas of sector A, allowing for a better understanding of the whole settlement's organisation.

== Chronology - Datation ==
Spatial distribution of the archaeological levels, objects and structures allow to evaluate the chronological framework of the settlement, indicating an horizontal stratigraphy as a consequence of occupation, abandonment and reoccupation. Stratigraphic observation suggests the existence of a minimum of two distinct site occupations characterised by different construction materials: wood and stone. During the older phase (5.290-5.200 cal BC) the settlement can be described as a pile dwelling site and it represents the largest known settlement in the NE of the Iberian Peninsula, while in the later phase (5.100-4.800 cal BC) large surfaces were covered by stone pavement. In sectors B and D, the differentiation is clearly evident, as the travertine pavement overlaps the collapsed wood structure. Between the oldest occupation and the most recent there is a possible gap of 100 years suggesting the abandonment of the site probably due to environmental changes that promoted its recurrent flooding.

== Palaeoenvironment ==
Early Neolithic populations settled in a dense tree cover region composed of deciduous oak forest and riparian forests. On the shore of the lake, the riparian forest included different species adapted to cool and humid weather : elm (Ulmus sp.), ashes (Fraxinus sp.), willows (Salix sp.), and probably hazeltree (Corylus avellana), alder (Alnus glutinosa) or laurel (Laurus nobilis). In addition, it would have been possible to find hygrophilous and aquatic plants in this environment like sedges (Cyperaceae), reeds (Juncus sp.), bulrushes (Typha sp.), yarrow (Myriophyllum), water grass (Potamogeton sp.) and water lilies (Nuphar), while in the mountains surrounding the lakes a forest was probably composed by conifers - pines (Pinus sp.) and firs (Abies alba). Other mountain taxa (yew, Taxus baccata, and birch, Betula) and mediterranean taxa (kermes oak, Quercus ilex-coccifera, and wild olive, Olea sp.) were identified in the site area.

The need to obtain wood for fuel and building material caused a profound transformation of the vegetation. The deforestation action of the communities of La Draga had a strong impact on the sedimentation processes during the second phase of the occupation and on the oak groves that surrounded the village. It created clearings that would have been used to establish crop fields, graze animals, but which would also have been colonised by secondary species, such as pine, lime (Tilia sp.), hazel or boxwood (Buxus sempervirens). These species would have proliferated in these degraded areas.

== Archaeological material ==
The artefacts in general reflect that of a Cardial tradition and show ornamental similarities to neighbouring areas, namely the south-eastern part of France, Mediterranean coast, and the Pyrenean and pre-Pyrenean areas.

=== Wooden artefacts ===
The Neolithic communities exploited mainly laurel and oak as firewood, but also fungi for tinder. A greater variability is documented among the wood species for the manufacture of tools. Woods were selected for their physical and mechanical properties. Thus, yew was used for bows and willow for arrow shafts. Combs, double-stitched needles, sickles and digging sticks were made of boxwood. Wooden containers and shovels were made of deciduous oak. Same type of objects were done in different species, such as the adze handles that are in yew, oak, pine or boxwood.

=== Basketry and plant fibres ===
The cordages, ropes and baskets found in La Draga were also made of different woody fibres (Tilia sp., Clematis sp.) or herbaceous fibres (Urtica sp.; monocotyledon such as Poaceae, Cyperaceae, Typhaceae). Amongst these objects were found a whole roll of clematis, a plant fibre with no manufacture, fragments of basketry made from rushes and hemp, and fragments of rope. Various manufacturing patterns were identified: braiding, twisting and knotting. These fibrous artefacts attest to different functions. For example, some of them could have been used as bowstrings. Others could have been used as containers, especially for storing cereal seeds.

=== Textile production ===
Although no textile fragments have been recovered so far, tools linked to textile production processes have been found, such as combs, spindles and/or shuttles made from boxwood, as well as eye needles and bone awls. All these tools are similar to those used by ancient and modern communities during processes such as spinning and weaving. The combs are used to card the weave before spinning or to press the weft during weaving, making it denser and more compact. Double-stitched needles can be used as a shuttle, passing the weft yarn from one side of the loom to the other during weaving. They can also be used as a spindle for spinning by hand or with a fusayola, a piece that is attached to the spindle and allows faster spinning. Wooden and bone instruments with central perforations have been found that could have had this function. The bone tools include awls, used to select and separate the warp threads or to press the weft during weaving. Three needle fragments have also been recorded. Other tools, such as possible tensioners and warpers, have also been found. Finally, the studies carried out to date indicate that the fibre used was of plant origin, possibly nettle (Urtica dioica); and animal, sheep and/or goat hair.

=== Seeds ===
The extraordinary preservation conditions at La Draga site have made it possible to study the largest collection of remains of seeds and fruits in the whole of the Neolithic period on the Iberian Peninsula (circa 400,000 remains). This important set of remains has been the basis for understanding the agriculture practised by the inhabitants of the settlement and the fruits they harvested.

The farmers of La Draga were among the first to practise agriculture in the north-east of the Iberian Peninsula. The main crops grown in the settlement were durum wheat (Triticum durum/turgidum) and two-row barley or palm barley (Hordeum distichon). These cereals are intensively cultivated in small permanent fields tilled by hand (with wooden digging sticks). A third important crop documented at the site is opium poppy (Papaver somniferum), possibly used to extract oil from the seeds, but also for its psychotropic properties.

In addition to the consumption of agricultural products, it has been observed how hazelnuts (Corylus avellana), acorns (Quercus sp.), blackberries (Rubus ulmifolius) and blueberries (Prunus spinosa), among other autochthonous species, were collected. It seems that cherries (Prunus avium) may also have been consumed and their stones used to make beads. In this way, and with the addition of meat resources, the inhabitants of La Draga ensured their daily survival.

=== Ceramic ===
Most of the ceramic materials at La Draga presented the typical decorative features of Neolithic Cardial ware tradition. The most commonly used decoration is that made with the rim of the mollusc of the genus Cardium, both in the form of impressions, forming jagged lines, with slightly curved sections, interrupted after each impression; and the dragging of the entire rim, forming incised stripes. More rarely, there are also impressions or incisions made with a comb, fingernail, spatula or awl; and reliefs in the form of a smooth cord.

Ceramic assemblages have a predominance of large and medium thicknesses, which should correspond to vessels used for the storage, cooking and consumption of different foodstuffs. The pottery have a limited variety of shapes, with rounded profiles and hemispherical, subspherical with or without a neck, and cylindrical bases. The manufacturing process is coiling. After firing, the pottery is finished by smoothing and polishing and decorated with impressions and incisions on part of its surface. The proportion of decorated vessels should be very high, close to 70-80%, in the oldest level of the site (Cardial chronology) while somewhat lower in the most recent level.

=== Lithic tools ===
Many of the lithic tools used were made of various types of rock. Some knapped tools were made of opaque and darked-colour siliceous rocks, coming respectively from the mountain of Montjuic in Barcelona (115 km south) and from the Sigean Narbonne basin situated in France (110 km north). Flints were almost exclusively used in different tools such as sickle blades, drills, arrowheads and as utensils to scrape materials such as wood, bone, horn and skin.

Rocks of local origin, such as vein and hyaline quartz, were used in smaller quantities.

Polished stone blades were made of metamorphic rocks (schist and hornfels) being the active parts of the axes, from which several handles have been recovered. These utensils are generally related to woodworking and have an asymmetric active edge that allows them to be held in a way that the active part is perpendicular to the handle.

Moreover, macrolithic tools were made of granular rocks such as basalt and granite, and used for the processing of some vegetables, such as grinding cereals. Other finer-grained rocks such as stoneware clay and sandstones could be used to grind, polish and sharpen various materials such as bones and wood.

== Organisation of the site ==
=== Architecture ===
==== Wood structures ====
The vast majority of the architectural elements are made from oak wood. It is a raw material widely used for both construction and shipbuilding during all historical periods because of its resistance to humidity, its robustness, and its straight shape. Other species, such as laurel, are abundant in piles and wood assemblage. The predominance of laurel remains in the charcoal and piles wood assemblage needs to be stressed out as it is unusual to find this taxa in Neolithic sites - the only comparable settlement on this is the Neolithic waterlogged site of La Marmotta (Italy)

Timber construction is well documented in sectors B and D during the oldest phase of occupation. They were preserved thanks to the water table above the archaeological level. In the other sectors, timber construction is evidenced by the post holes left by the vertical posts. In order to establish the different construction phases, dendrochronological analysis was made.

The shape and arrangement of these elements at the site shows constructions characterised by:

- Quadrangular-shaped constructions; the layout pattern is not typical of a circular structure.
- Constructions of large dimensions; elements up to 5 metres long and 3 metres high have been identified.
- Constructions with a great importance of ropes and seals as unified elements: no elaborate interlocking between architectural elements is observed.

==== Stone structures ====
The building materials and hearths known from the more recent period of occupation of La Draga, are quite different from those of the oldest phase. The latter used mainly wood to build huts with hearths installed on a thick layer of clay, while during the second phase these wooden constructions were buried under large travertine slabs pavements on which domestic activities were carried out

The evidence of new huts is reduced to a few small oval areas well tiled (zone A), surrounded by post holes and with some central post, which would have supported a vegetation cover. On the other hand, the hearths are very numerous and seem to be quickly depleted, as if community life took place more outside than inside the huts. These hearths were found containing remains of animal bones, cereals and mussels consumed, ceramic vessels, stone axes, firewood coals, as well as quartz and sandstone slabs and cobbles used for roasting, baking or stewing food.

=== Woodworking and carpentry ===
Carpentry or woodworking was one of the main economic activities at La Draga, in terms of the quantity of wood worked and the quality of the work carried out.

For the elaboration of architectural elements, carpentry work is limited almost exclusively to breaking and grinding and it requires the processing of large timbers and, in general, a much larger volume of raw material. The architectural elements crafted were mostly poles, pitchforks, beams, planks and branch latticework.

Among the tools recovered at the site, those used for woodworking were axes, wedges, hammers, flint scrapers and polisher sandstones.

=== Subsistence ===
The community of La Draga based its subsistence on agricultural and livestock activities. The different types of remains have allowed researchers to make a first approach on prehistoric diet from an integrated and multidisciplinary perspective. All the phases of food acquisition and transformation are documented: from obtaining it through activities such as agriculture, livestock, gathering, hunting and fishing, through processing and/or cooking with different techniques such as butchering and grinding, to finally its consumption, using several methods like roasting, boiling, or eating it raw.

Domestic products had a clear predominance in the diet over wild products. Domestic animals, such as pigs, cattle, sheep and goats, were the most processed and consumed species. However, wild animals such as deer, wild boar, and different types of birds, were hunted and also consumed, but in a limited quantity. Evidence of fish and molluscs (lacustrine and marine) were also found. The agriculture was cereal-based, focused mostly on the cultivation of naked wheat, legumes and oilseeds (poppies), but wild fruits (hazelnuts, blackberries, acorns) were also processed.

Tools specifically related to the cooking and consumption of food have also been recovered, such as several wooden bowls, ceramic vessels of different shapes and sizes, wooden ladles and spatulas, a bone spoon, a tortoise shell, as well as probable cooking stones.
