= List of UN numbers 2601 to 2700 =

UN numbers from UN2601 to UN2700 as assigned by the United Nations Committee of Experts on the Transport of Dangerous Goods are as follows:

== UN 2601 to UN 2700 ==
| UN Number | Class | Proper Shipping Name |
|---|---|---|
| UN 2601 | 2 | Cyclobutane |
| UN 2602 | 2 | Dichlorodifluoromethane and difluoroethane azeotropic mixture or Refrigerant gas R 500 with approximately 74 percent dichlorodifluoromethane |
| UN 2603 | 3 | Cycloheptatriene |
| UN 2604 | 8 | Boron trifluoride diethyl etherate |
| UN 2605 | 3 | Methoxymethyl isocyanate |
| UN 2606 | 6.1 | Methyl orthosilicate |
| UN 2607 | 3 | Acrolein dimer, stabilized |
| UN 2608 | 3 | Nitropropanes |
| UN 2609 | 6.1 | Triallyl borate |
| UN 2610 | 3 | Triallylamine |
| UN 2611 | 6.1 | Propylene chlorohydrin |
| UN 2612 | 3 | Methyl propyl ether |
| UN 2613 | ? | (UN No. no longer in use) |
| UN 2614 | 3 | Methallyl alcohol |
| UN 2615 | 3 | Ethyl propyl ether |
| UN 2616 | 3 | Triisopropyl borate |
| UN 2617 | 3 | Methylcyclohexanols, flammable |
| UN 2618 | 3 | Vinylanilines, inhibited |
| UN 2619 | 8 | Benzyldimethylamine |
| UN 2620 | 3 | Amyl butyrates |
| UN 2621 | 3 | Acetyl methyl carbinol |
| UN 2622 | 3 | Glycidaldehyde |
| UN 2623 | 4.1 | Firelighters, solid with flammable liquid |
| UN 2624 | 4.3 | Magnesium silicide |
| UN 2625 | ? | (UN No. no longer in use) |
| UN 2626 | 5.1 | Chloric acid aqueous solution, with not more than 10 percent chloric acid |
| UN 2627 | 5.1 | Nitrites, inorganic, n.o.s. |
| UN 2628 | 6.1 | Potassium fluoroacetate |
| UN 2629 | 6.1 | Sodium fluoroacetate |
| UN 2630 | 6.1 | Selenate or Selenite |
| UN 2631 to 2641 | ? | (UN No.s no longer in use) |
| UN 2642 | 6.1 | Fluoroacetic acid |
| UN 2643 | 6.1 | Methyl bromoacetate |
| UN 2644 | 6.1 | Methyl iodide |
| UN 2645 | 6.1 | Phenacyl bromide |
| UN 2646 | 6.1 | Hexachlorocyclopentadiene |
| UN 2647 | 6.1 | Malononitrile |
| UN 2648 | 6.1 | 1,2-Dibromoethane-3-one |
| UN 2649 | 6.1 | 1,3-Dichloroacetone |
| UN 2650 | 6.1 | 1,1-Dichloro-1-nitroethane |
| UN 2651 | 6.1 | 4,4'-Diaminodiphenylmethane |
| UN 2652 | ? | (UN No. no longer in use) |
| UN 2653 | 6.1 | Benzyl iodide |
| UN 2654 | ? | (UN No. no longer in use) |
| UN 2655 | 6.1 | Potassium fluorosilicate |
| UN 2656 | 6.1 | Quinoline |
| UN 2657 | 6.1 | Selenium disulfide |
| UN 2658 | 6.1 | (UN No. no longer in use) Selenium (UN No. no longer in use) |
| UN 2659 | 6.1 | Sodium chloroacetate |
| UN 2660 | 6.1 | Nitrotoluidines (mono) |
| UN 2661 | 6.1 | Hexachloroacetone |
| UN 2662 | 6.1 | (UN No. no longer in use) Hydroquinone (UN No. no longer in use) |
| UN 2663 | ? | (UN No. no longer in use) |
| UN 2664 | 6.1 | Dibromomethane |
| UN 2665 | ? | (UN No. no longer in use) |
| UN 2666 | 4.3 | (UN No. no longer in use) Ethyl cyanoacetate (UN No. no longer in use) |
| UN 2667 | 6.1 | Butyltoluenes |
| UN 2668 | 6.1 | Chloroacetonitrile |
| UN 2669 | 6.1 | Chlorocresols, liquid or Chlorocresols, solid |
| UN 2670 | 8 | Cyanuric chloride |
| UN 2671 | 6.1 | Aminopyridines (o-; m-; p-) |
| UN 2672 | 8 | Ammonia solution, relative density between 0.880 and 0.957 at 15 °C in water, with more than 10 percent but not more than 35 percent ammonia |
| UN 2673 | 6.1 | 2-Amino-4-chlorophenol |
| UN 2674 | 6.1 | Sodium fluorosilicate |
| UN 2675 | ? | (UN No. no longer in use) Triethylenediamine (UN No. no longer in use) |
| UN 2676 | 2 | Stibine |
| UN 2677 | 8 | Rubidium hydroxide solution |
| UN 2678 | 8 | Rubidium hydroxide |
| UN 2679 | 8 | Lithium hydroxide solution |
| UN 2680 | 8 | Lithium hydroxide, monohydrate or Lithium hydroxide, solid |
| UN 2681 | 8 | Caesium hydroxide solution |
| UN 2682 | 8 | Caesium hydroxide |
| UN 2683 | 8 | Ammonium sulfide solution |
| UN 2684 | 3 | Diethylaminopropylamine |
| UN 2685 | 8 | N,N-Diethylethylenediamine |
| UN 2686 | 8 | 2-Diethylaminoethanol |
| UN 2687 | 4.1 | Dicyclohexylammonium nitrate |
| UN 2688 | 6.1 | 1-Chloro-3-bromopropane |
| UN 2689 | 6.1 | Glycerol alpha-monochlorohydrin |
| UN 2690 | 6.1 | N,n-Butyl imidazole |
| UN 2691 | 8 | Phosphorus pentabromide |
| UN 2692 | 8 | Boron tribromide |
| UN 2693 | 8 | Bisulfites, aqueous solutions, n.o.s. |
| UN 2694 to 2697 | ? | (UN No.s no longer in use) |
| UN 2698 | 8 | Tetrahydrophthalic anhydrides with more than 0.05 percent of maleic anhydride |
| UN 2699 | 8 | Trifluoroacetic acid |
| UN 2700 | ? | (UN No. no longer in use) |

== See also ==
- Lists of UN numbers
