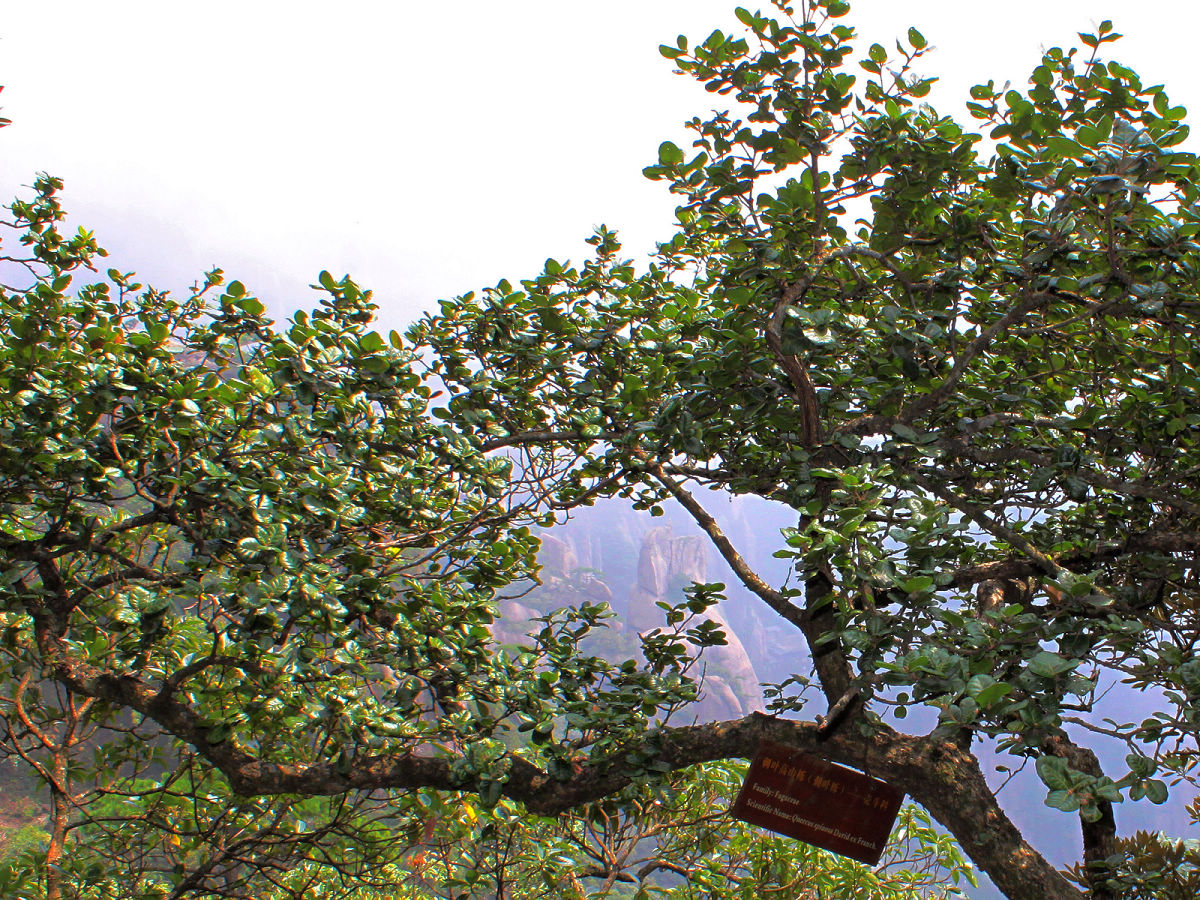
- General habitus of Quercus spinosa
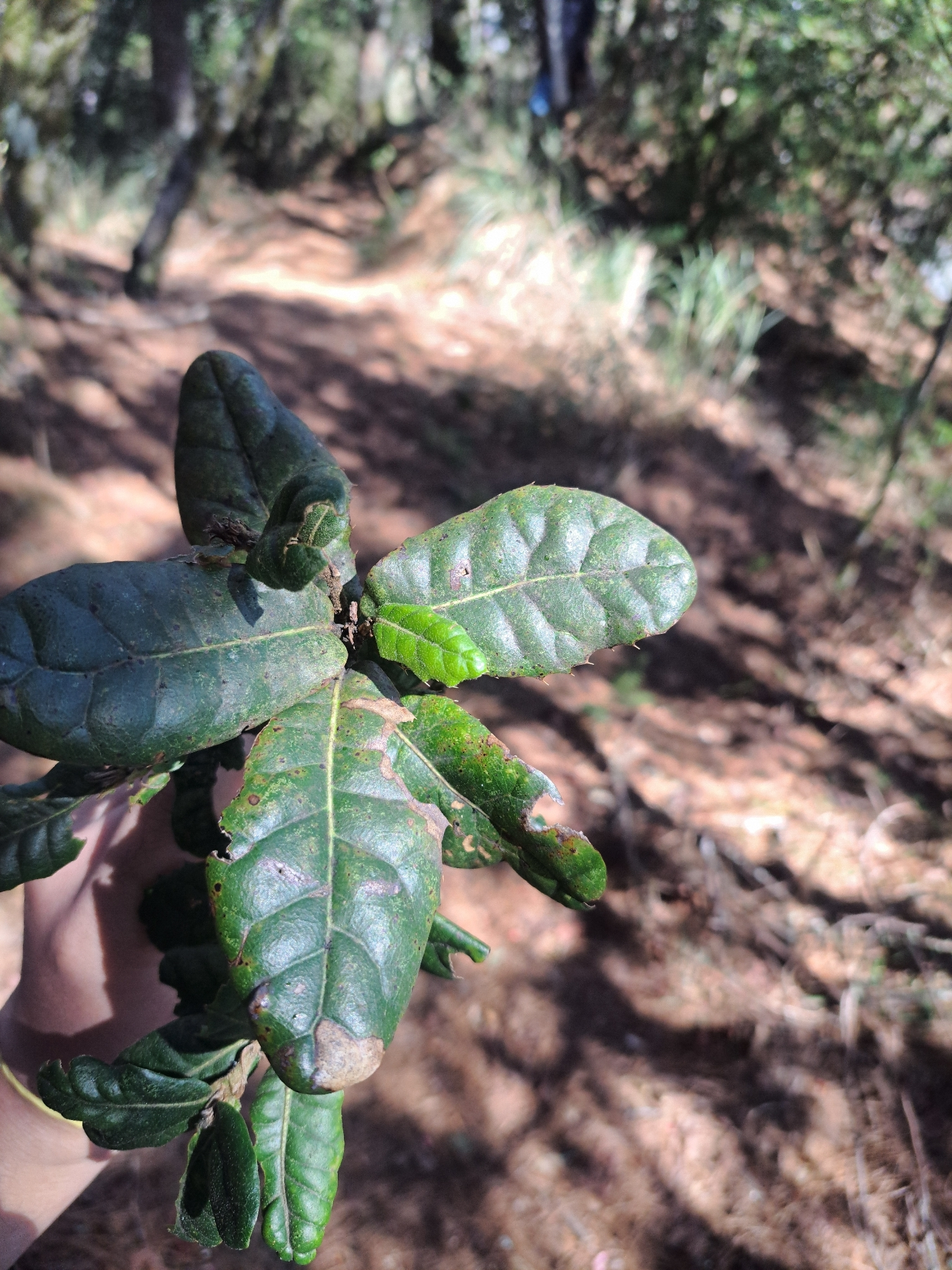
- Leaves of Quercus spinosa ssp. miyabei

Conservation status
- Least Concern (IUCN 3.1)

Scientific classification
- Kingdom: Plantae
- Clade: Embryophytes
- Clade: Tracheophytes
- Clade: Angiosperms
- Clade: Eudicots
- Clade: Rosids
- Order: Fagales
- Family: Fagaceae
- Genus: Quercus
- Subgenus: Quercus subg. Cerris
- Section: Quercus sect. Ilex
- Species: Q. spinosa

Binomial name
- Quercus spinosa David

Synonyms
- Quercus ilex var. spinosa (David) Franch.; Quercus semecarpifolia var. spinosa (David) Schottky

= Quercus spinosa =

Species of flowering plant

Quercus spinosa is a species of oak native to central China, Taiwan and Myanmar, in the subgenus Cerris, section Ilex. An evergreen tree, its leaf traits may be adaptations to elevation. It is placed in section Ilex.

== Subspecies ==
The following subspecies are currently accepted:

- Quercus spinosa subsp. miyabei (Hayata) A.Camus
- Quercus spinosa subsp. spinosa
