= Firelighter =

Fuel tablet for fire making

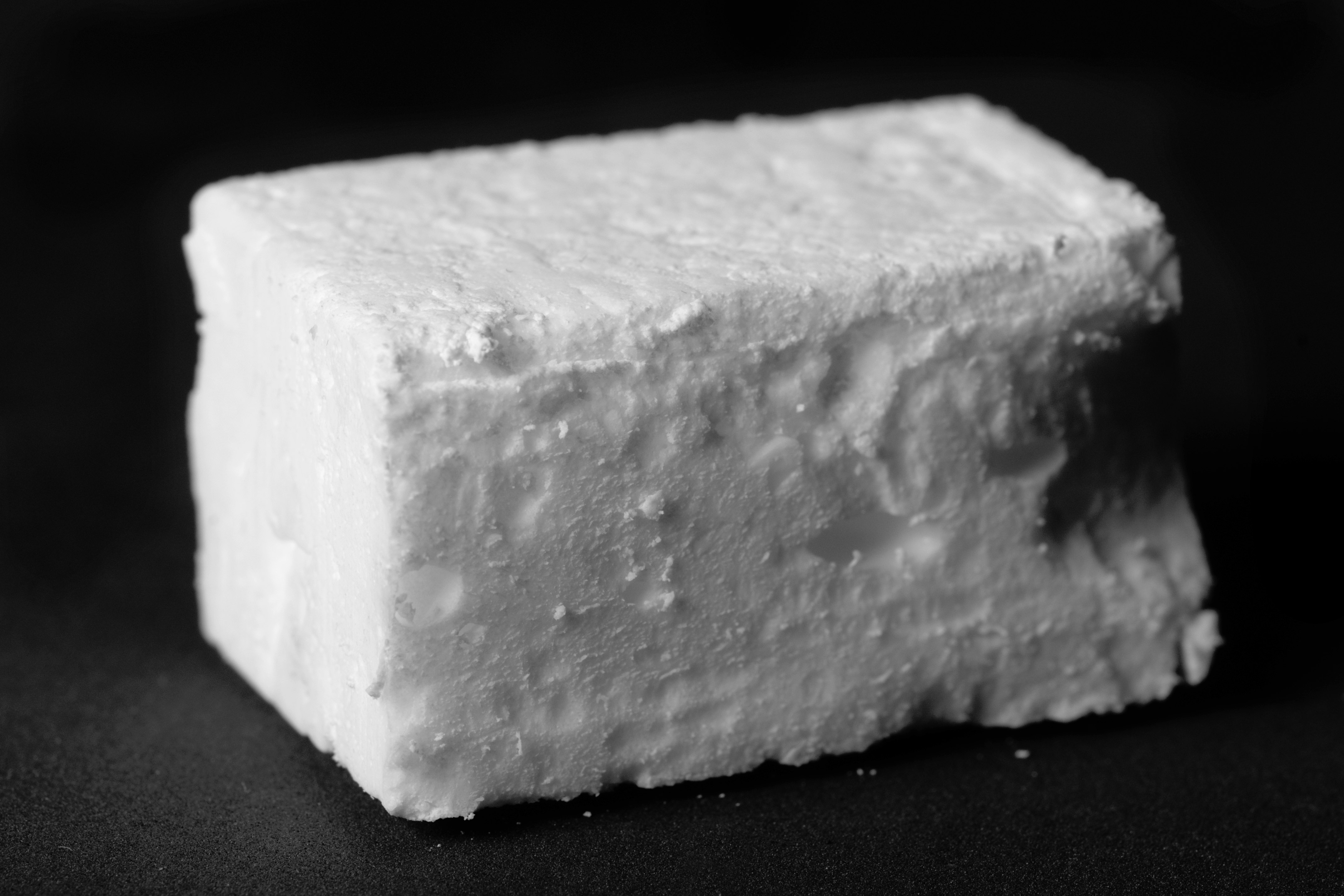
A petroleum-based fire starter for grills, camp fires, stoves or ovens

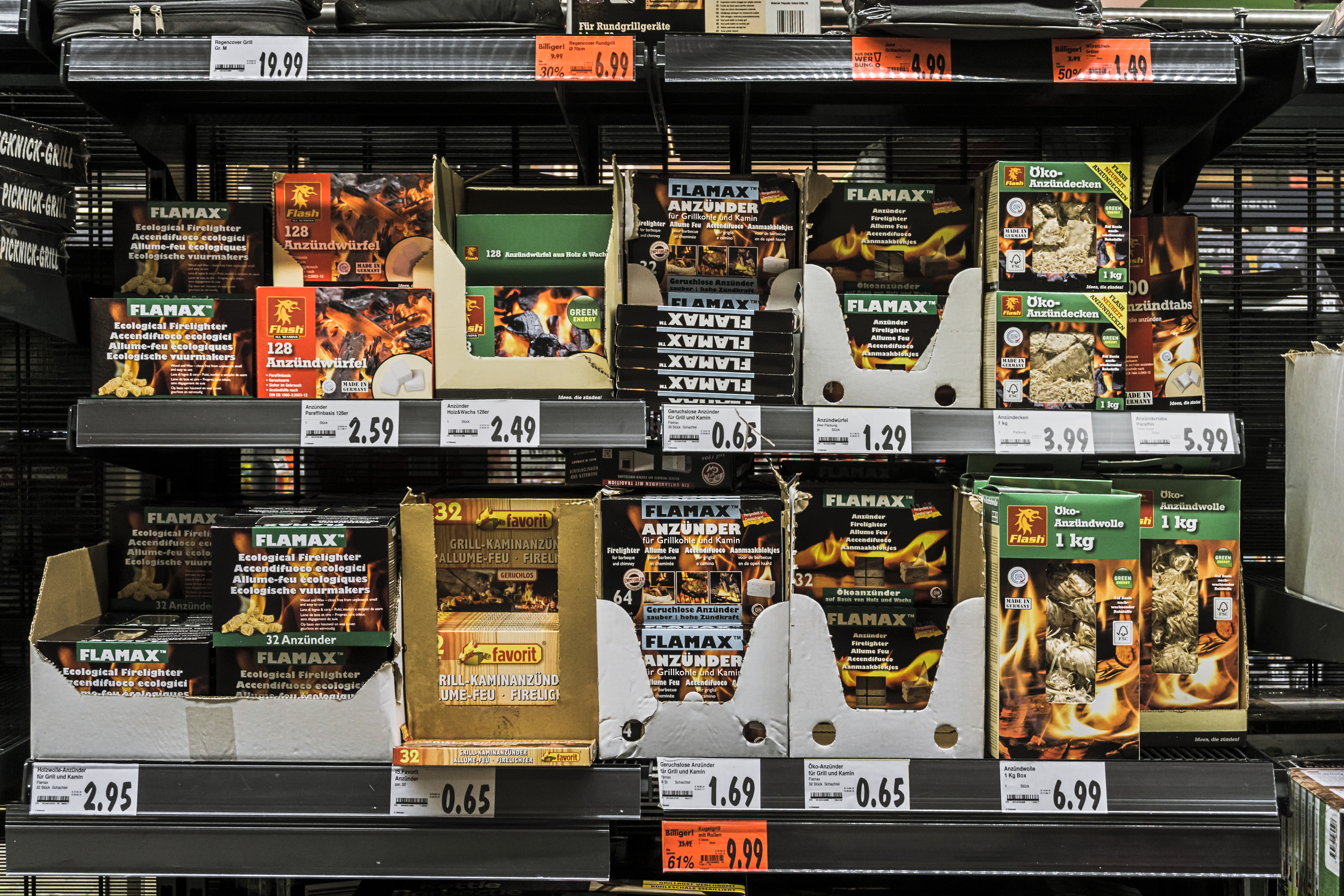
A variety of firelighters on sale in a German supermarket

A firelighter is a small solid fuel tablet for fire making. Firelighters marketed as consumer products may be used to start a wood or coal fire in a fireplace, wood-burning stove, or solid-fuel portable stove.

As a hazardous material, firelighters are assigned a UN number: 2623 ("Firelighters; solid with flammable liquid").

== See also ==
- Hexamine fuel tablet
