= Pump drill =

Simple hand tool

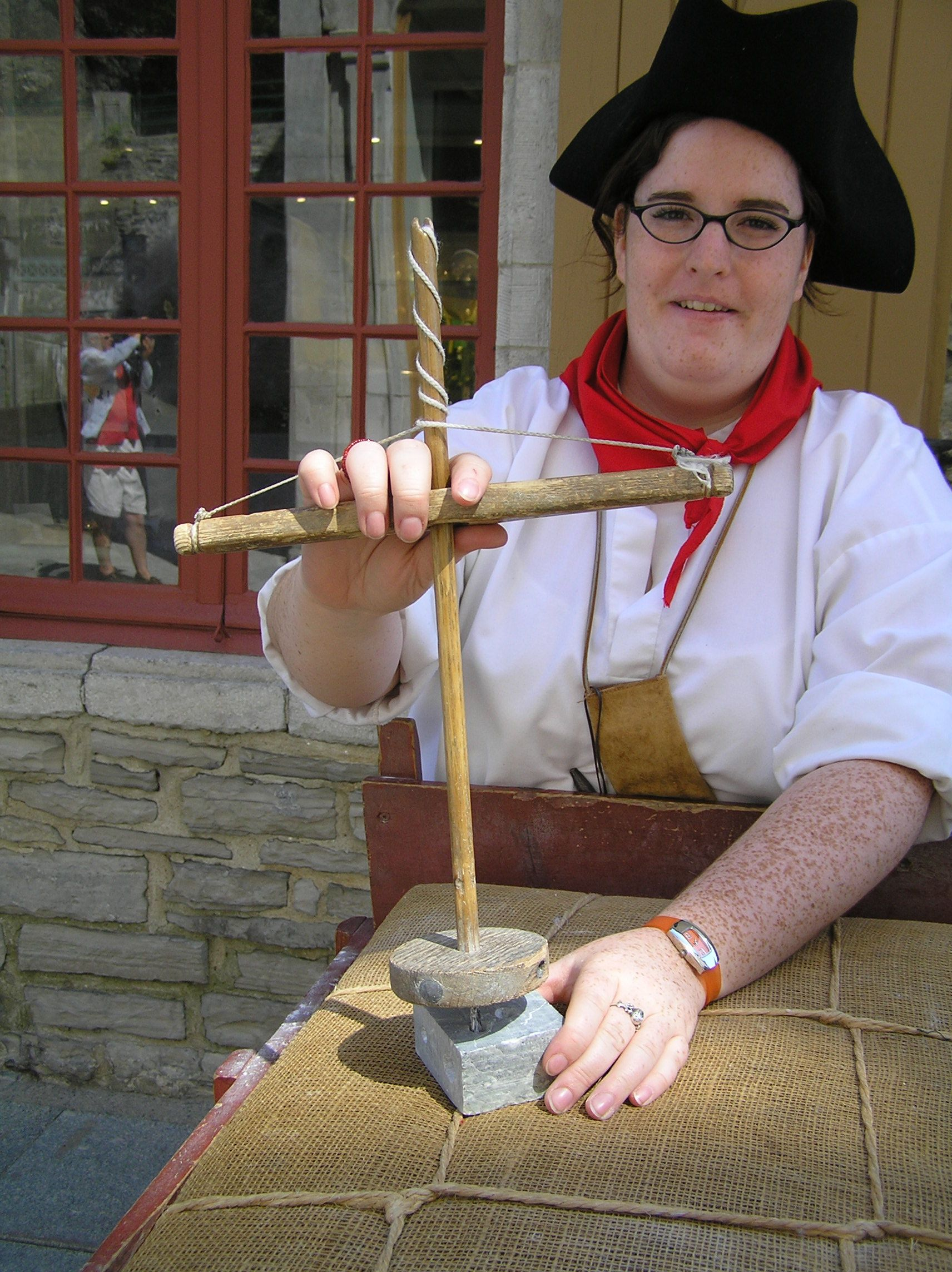
A pump drill

A pump drill is a simple hand-powered device used to impart a rapid rotating motion to a rod (the spindle or drill shaft). It can be used for fire making or as a drill to make holes in various materials. It consists of: the drill shaft, a narrow board with a hole through the center, a weight (usually a heavy disc) acting as a flywheel, and a length of cord. The weight is attached to the shaft, near the bottom end, and the hole board is slipped over the top. The cord is run through a hole or slot near the top of the shaft and attached to both ends of the hole board. The length of the cord is such that, at its lowest position, the board lies just above the weight.

The end of the shaft usually has a slot or hole that can hold a hard bit that does the actual drilling, either by abrasion or by cutting. For wood, the bit may be an auger bit or a simple triangular blade that can cut while rotating in either direction.

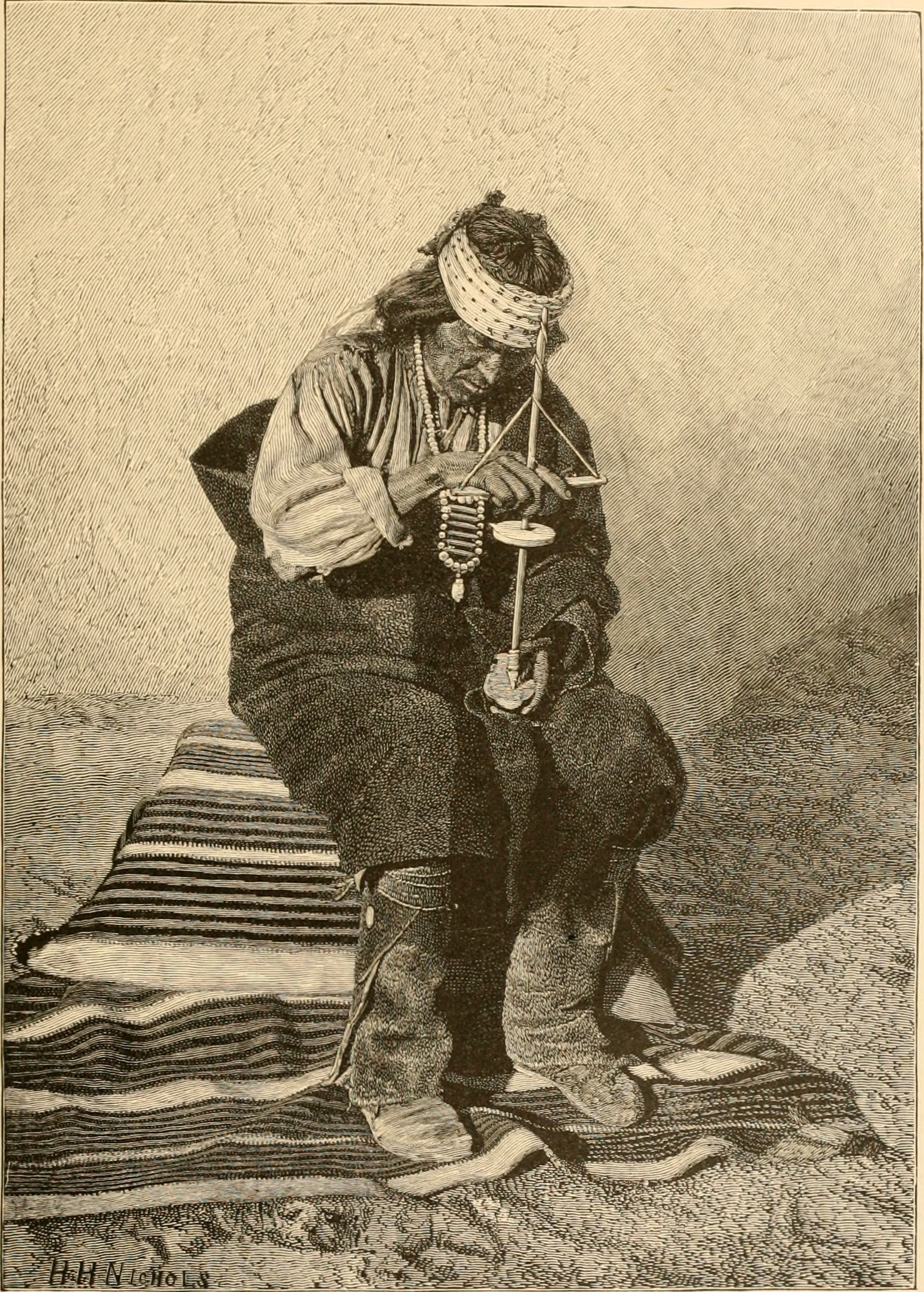
Native American drilling turquoise with a pump drill.

To use, the shaft is first turned by hand so that the cord wraps around the top part, as much as possible, and the board is as the highest position. A smooth downward pressure is exerted on the board, causing the shaft to rapidly spin. Once the bottom is reached, the pressure is relieved. The weight then keeps the shaft spinning so that the cord wind again around it, in the opposite sense, pulling the board up to the starting position, much like a yo-yo or button whirligig. The process then can be repeated.

== See also ==
- Bow drill, strap drill
- Hand drill
