= Bow drill =

Drilling tool of prehistoric origin operated by the cord of a bow

A bow drill is a simple hand-operated type of tool, consisting of a rod (the spindle or drill shaft) that is set in rapid rotary motion by means of a cord wrapped around it, kept taut by a bow which is pushed back and forth with one hand. This tool of prehistoric origin has been used both as a drill, to make holes on solid materials such as wood, stone, or bone, and as a fire drill to start a fire.

An image of a wooden bow drill designed for fire starting

The spindle can be held into a fixed frame, or by a hand-held block (the hand piece or thimble) with a hole into which the top of the shaft is inserted. Some lubricant should be used to reduce friction between these two parts, otherwise, it could lead to some trouble when doing it too fast. In Pakistan it has been dated between the 5th–4th millenniums BCE.

== History ==
This tool of prehistoric origin has been used both as a drill, to make holes on solid materials such as wood, stone, or bone (including teeth), and as a fire drill to start a fire.

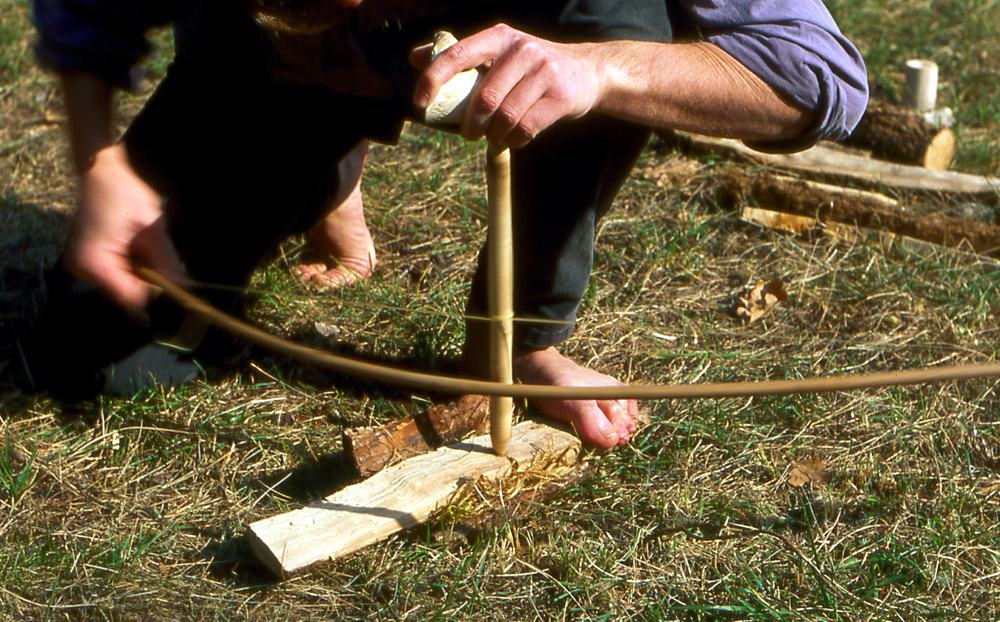
A bow drill being used

Bow drills with green jasper bits were used in Mehrgarh (Pakistan) between the 5th and 4th millenniums BCE to drill holes into lapis lazuli and carnelian. Similar drills were found in other parts of the Indus Valley civilization and Iran one millennium later.

A popular campcraft book of 1920 attributed the invention to the Inuit.

== Construction ==
The string of the bow is wrapped once around the spindle, so that it is tight enough not to slip during operation. In a variation called the Egyptian bow drill, the cord is wound around the shaft multiple times, or is fixed to it by a knot or a hole.

The strap drill is a simpler version, where the bow is absent and the cord is kept taut by pulling the ends with both hands, while moving them left and right at the same time. In the absence of a frame, the thimble is shaped so that it can be held with the chin or the mouth.

== Uses ==
For use as a fire drill, the shaft should have a blunt end, which is placed into a small cavity of a stationary piece of wood (the fireboard). Turning the shaft with high speed and downward pressure generates heat, which eventually creates powdered charcoal and ignites it forming a small ember.

For drilling, the lower end of the spindle may be fitted with a hard drill bit that creates the hole by abrasion or cutting.

The bow lathe used for traditional woodturning uses the same principle as the bow drill.

== See also ==
- Brace (tool)
- Pump drill
