= Ember =

Hot lump of slowly burning solid fuel

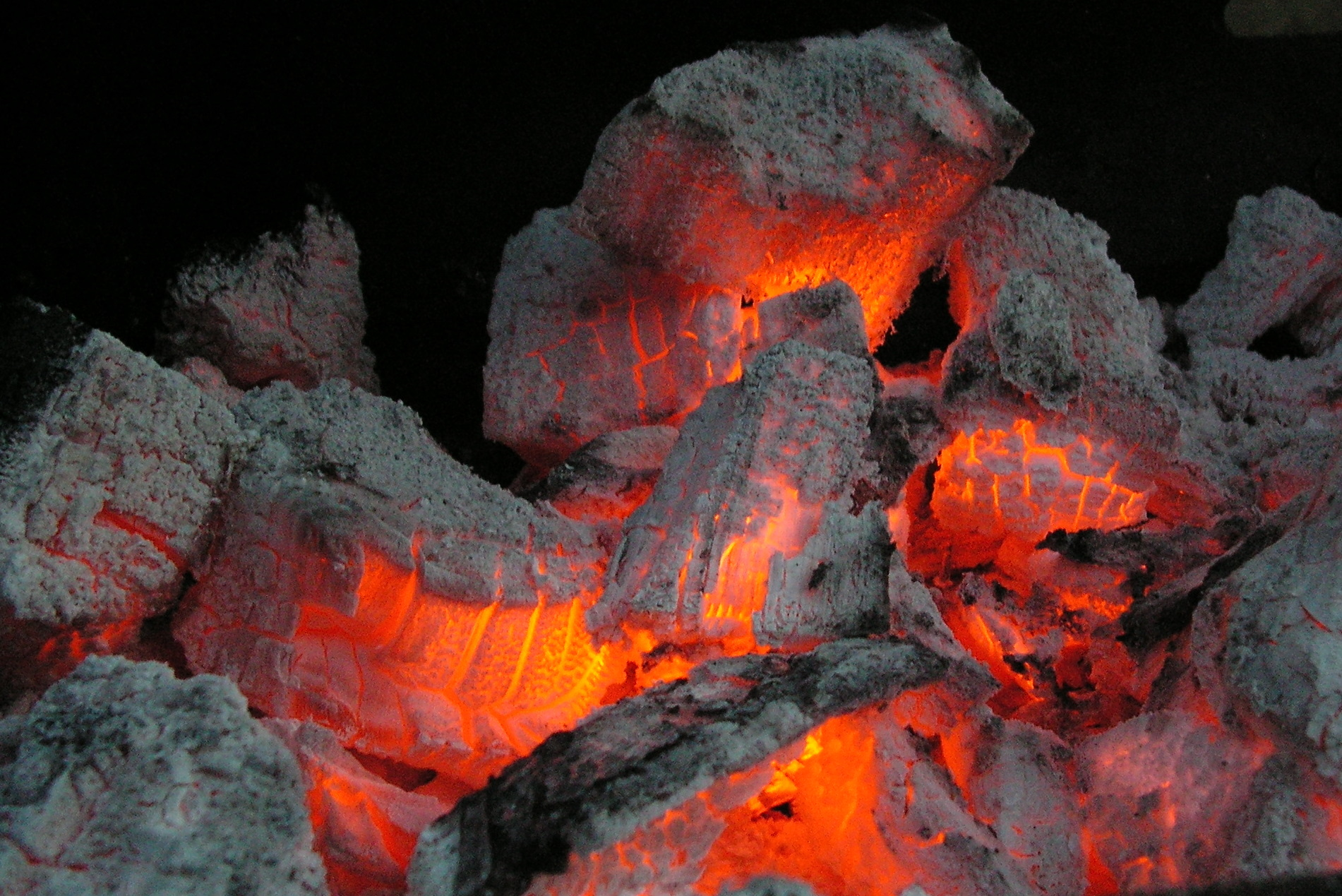
Embers of coal

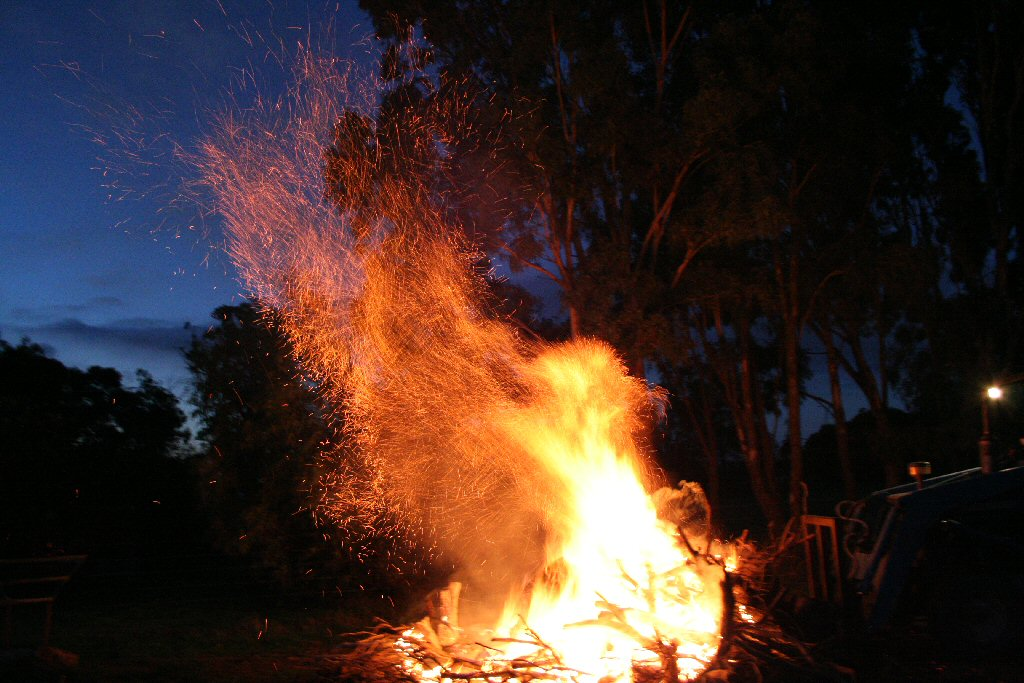
A bonfire in rural Australia, with a large number of sparks being blown by the wind; sparks are akin to embers in a similar way that dust is to stone.

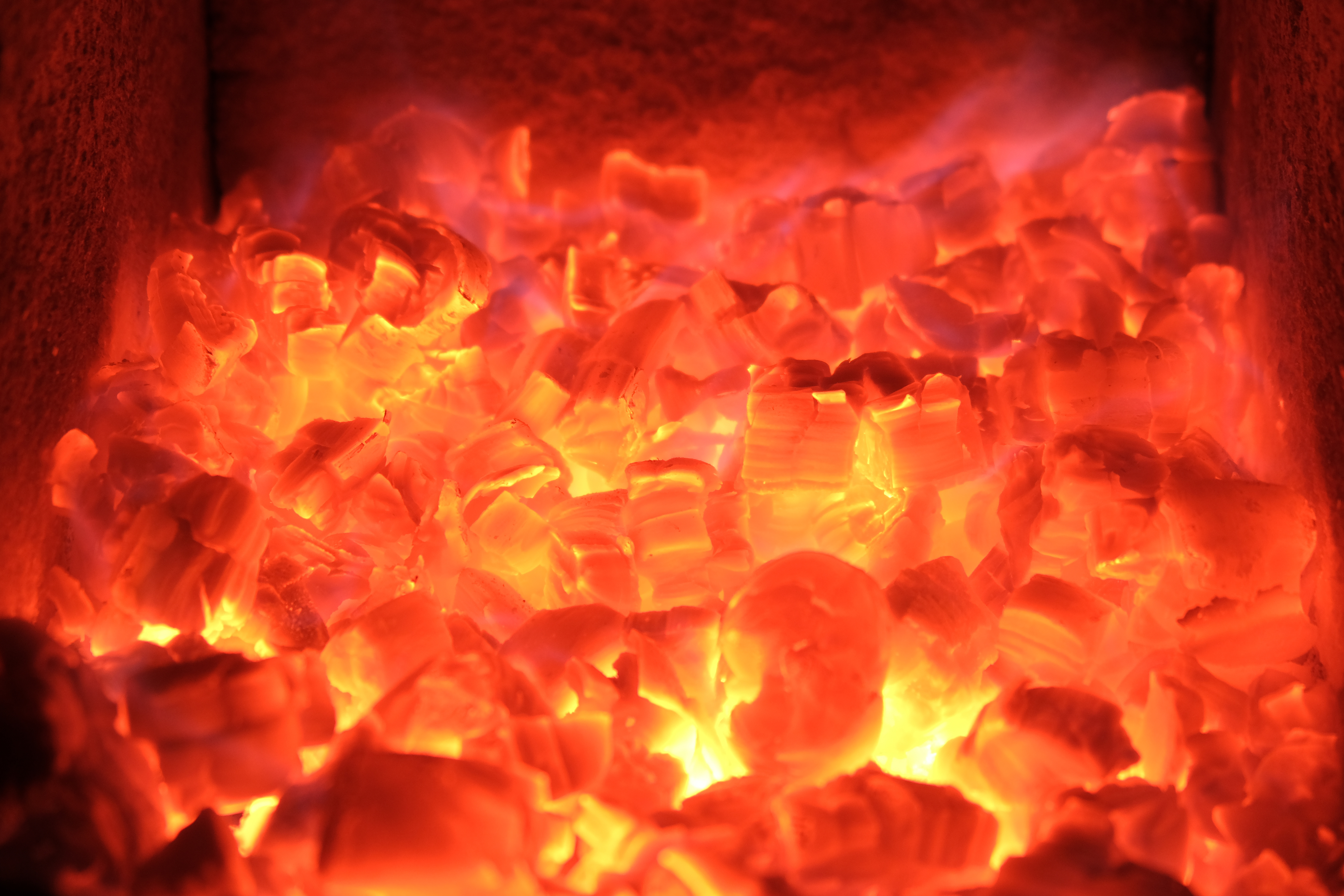
Embers of firewood used in sauna stove

An ember, also called a hot coal, is a hot lump of smouldering solid fuel, typically glowing, composed of greatly heated wood, coal, or other carbon-based material. Embers (hot coals) can exist within, remain after, or sometimes precede, a fire. Embers are, in some cases, as hot as the fire which created them. They radiate a substantial amount of heat long after the fire has been extinguished, and if not taken care of properly can rekindle a fire that is thought to be completely extinguished and can pose a fire hazard. In order to avoid the danger of accidentally spreading a fire, many campers pour water on the embers or cover them in dirt. Alternatively, embers can be used to relight a fire after it has gone out without the need to rebuild the fire – in a conventional fireplace, a fire can easily be relit up to 12 hours after it goes out, provided that there is enough space for air to circulate between the embers and the introduced fuel.

They are often used for cooking, such as in charcoal barbecues. This is because embers radiate a more consistent form of heat, as opposed to an open fire, which is constantly changing along with the heat it radiates.

An ember is formed when a fire has only partially burnt a piece of fuel, and there is still usable chemical energy in that piece of fuel. This happens because the usable chemical energy is so deep into the center that air (specifically oxygen) does not reach it, and it therefore does not combust (carbon-based fuel + O_{2} → CO_{2} + H_{2}O + C + other chemicals involved). It continues to stay hot and does not lose its thermal energy quickly because combustion is still happening at a low level. The small yellow, orange and red lights often seen among the embers are actually combustion; the combustion is just not happening at a fast enough rate to create a flame. Once the embers are completely 'burned through', the remains are oxidized minerals like carbon, calcium and phosphorus. At that point they are called ashes.

Embers play a large role in forest fires, wildland fires or wildland–urban interface fires. Because embers are typically burnt leaves and thus small and lightweight, they can easily become airborne. During a large fire, with the right conditions, embers can be blown far ahead of the fire front, starting spot fires several kilometres/miles away. A number of practical measures can be undertaken by homeowners to reduce the consequences of such an "ember attack" that bombards especially wooden structures and starts property fires.
