= Feather stick =

Form of tinder for starting fires

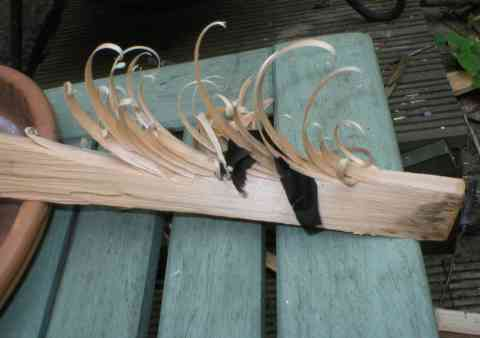
Feather stick ready to be ignited

A feather stick (sometimes referred to as a fuzz stick) is a length of wood which has been shaved to produce a cluster of thin curls protruding from the wood. It allows damp wood to be used to start a fire when dry tinder is hard to find.

It is believed to be a traditional method of fire starting, using basic tools and methods.

== Use ==
Feather sticks are made from dead "standing" wood, such as a branch that has broken from a tree and died, but has not yet fallen to the ground. The bark and the outer layer of wood are removed to reveal the drier heartwood. This is then shaved, with axe or knife, to produce as many curls as possible.

While the flakes can be fairly coarse, the finer they are shaved the more easily they ignite.

Feather sticks can be used with char cloth, where a small piece of the cloth is wound around the curls and a spark is struck on to it, using either the traditional flint and steel or a modern ferrocerium striker. This is then blown onto until the curls catch fire: the whole feather stick is then placed into the waiting kindling to start the campfire.

== See also ==
- Bushcraft – Wilderness survival skills
