= Tinderbox =

Container for fire-starting materials with flint, firesteel, and tinder

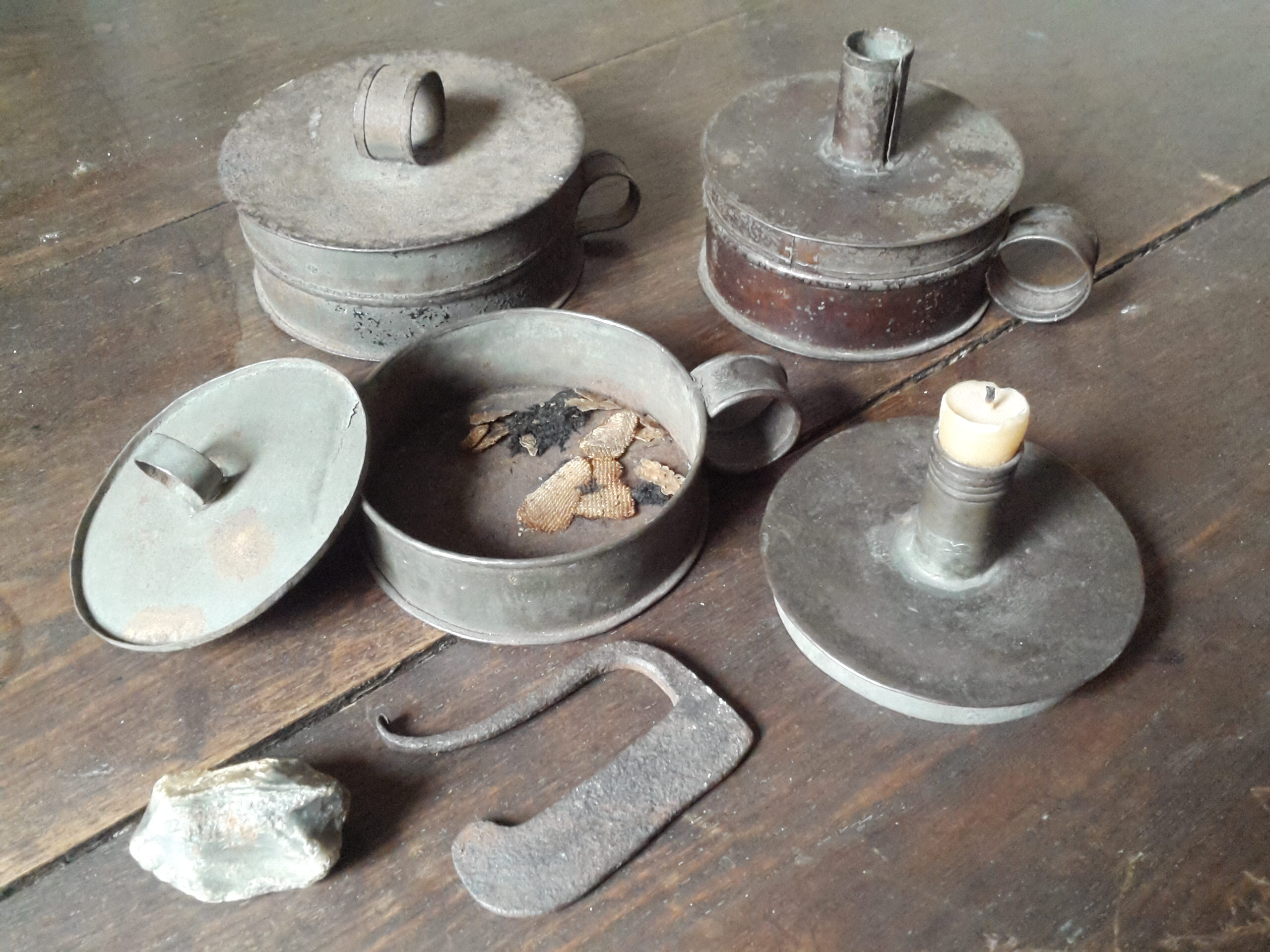
Sheet iron tinderboxes. English, 18th and early 19th C.

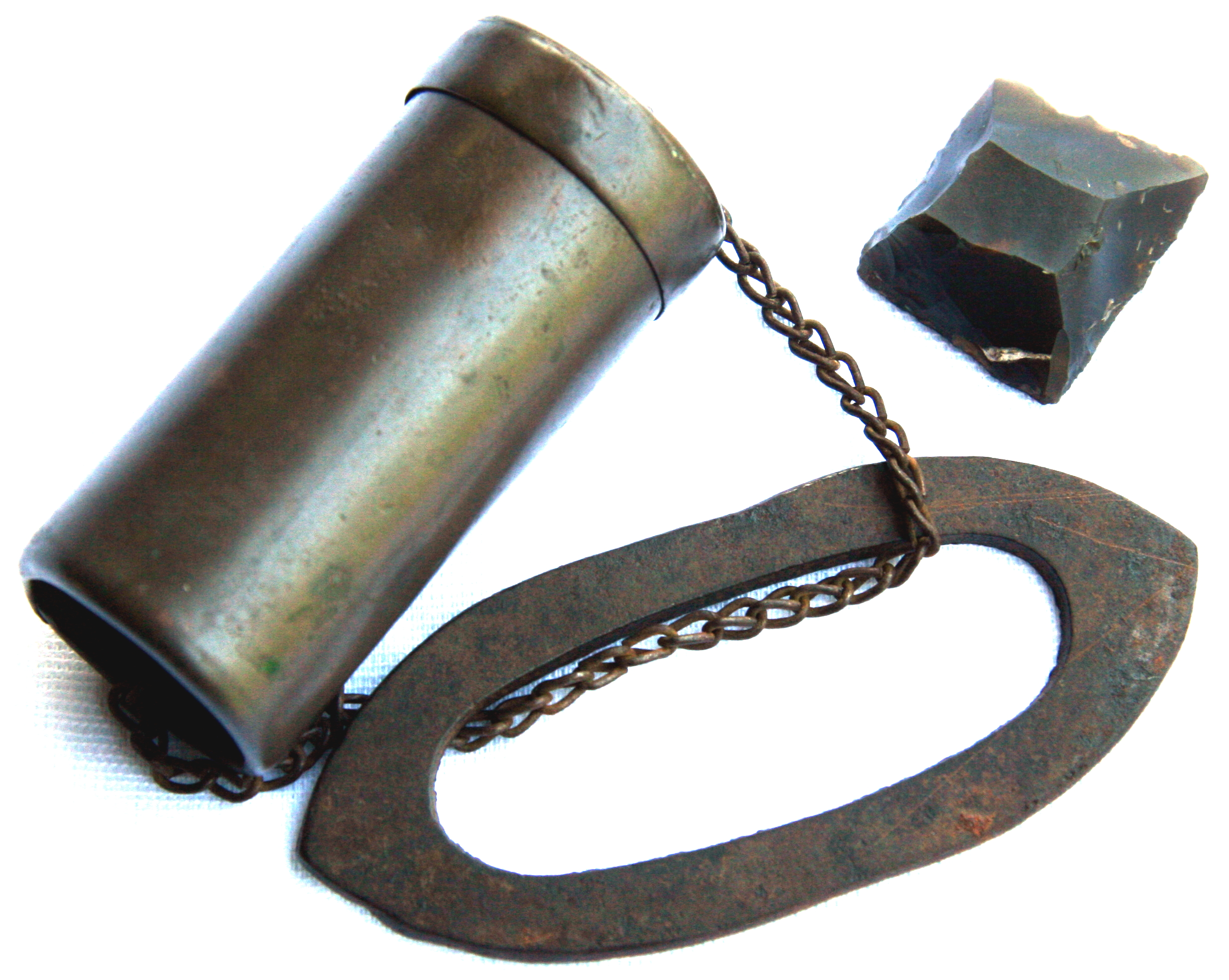
Pocket tinderbox with firesteel and flint. This type was used during the Boer War due to a scarcity of matches

A tinderbox, or patch box, is a container made of wood or metal containing flint, firesteel, and tinder (typically charcloth, but possibly a small quantity of dry, finely divided fibrous matter such as hemp), used together to help kindle a fire. A tinderbox may also contain sulfur-tipped matches.

Tinderboxes fell out of general usage when friction matches were invented.

== History ==
Throughout prehistoric Europe flint and iron pyrites (commonly known as fool's gold) were struck against one another in order to create a spark for firelighting. As an example, Ötzi (the natural mummy of a man who lived some time between 3350 and 3105 BC, discovered in September 1991) was found with tinder fungus along with flint and pyrite for creating sparks.

With the development of iron ore smelting in the Iron Age, the firesteel eventually replaced pyrites. This was simply a piece of carbon steel (it is difficult to obtain sparks with ordinary iron), which was usually wrought into a 'D' shape, or an oval ring, so that it could be conveniently looped around two or three fingers for striking. The flint was sometimes chipped to provide a suitably sharp edge to obtain a spark and if necessary other hard stones, such as quartzite, chert or chalcedony, could be substituted.

Charcloth was fabric made from vegetable fibre, such as cotton, linen, or jute, which had been charred via pyrolysis to give it the low ignition temperature and slow burning characteristics suitable for use as tinder. Rotten wood, known as touchwood, was also used, as well as amadou, which was a tinder prepared from fungus steeped in potassium nitrate (saltpetre) and dried.

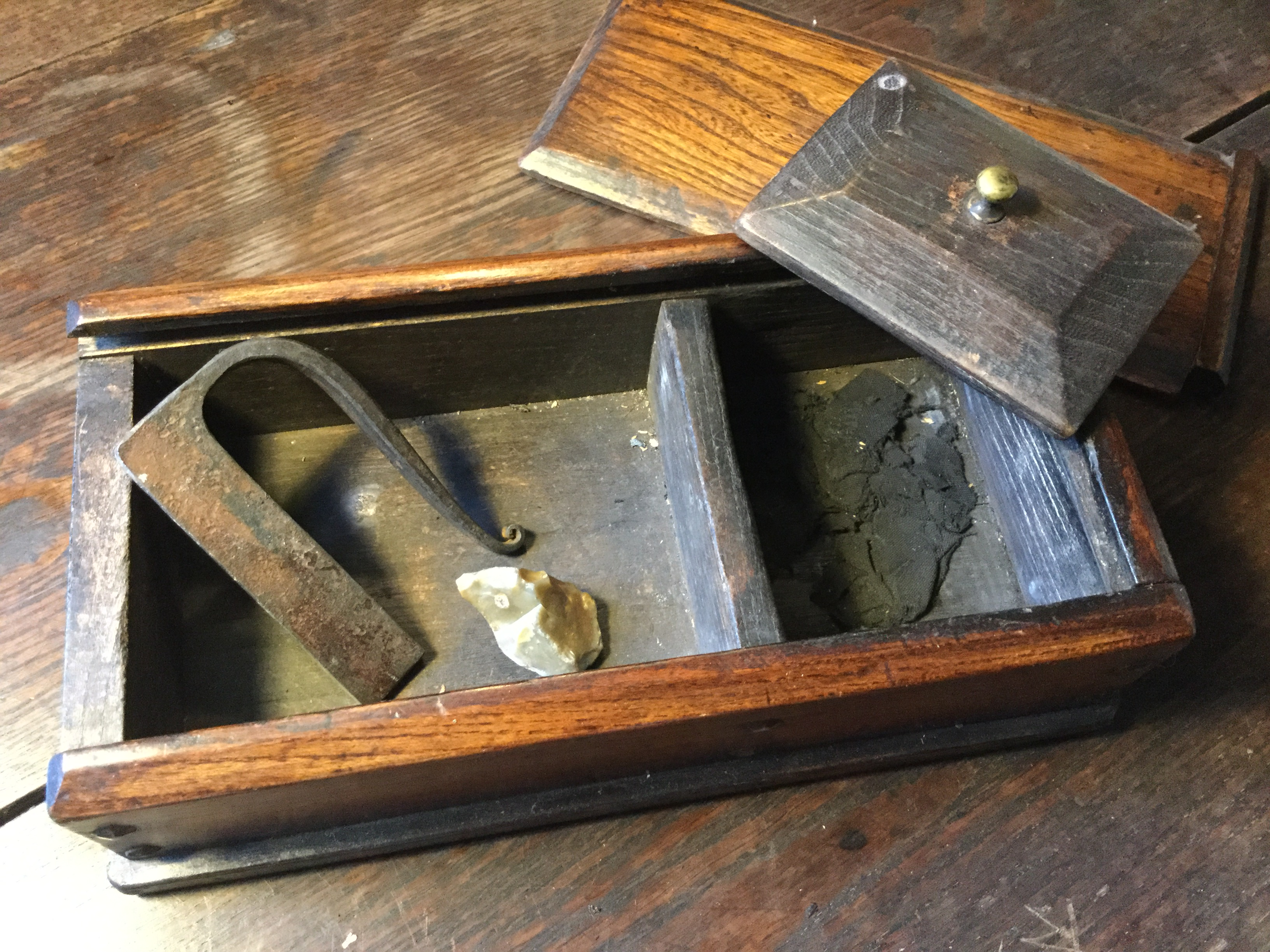
Wooden tinderbox with separate compartments for the firesteel, flint etc. and tinder. English or Welsh, 18th C.

When away from home small pocket tinderboxes were often carried, sometimes set with a burning glass (a magnifying lens) in the lid to light the tinder directly from the sun's rays. The poorer people working in the fields would obtain a light by simply striking a flint on the back of a knife onto a piece of touchpaper (paper impregnated with potassium nitrate) that they carried in their pockets.

The tinder pistol, based on the flintlock mechanism, was a more expensive alternative to the tinderbox and was in use in middle and upper-class homes in the 18th century. In the early 19th century a more efficient tinderbox was invented with a rotating metal wheel to create the sparks and there were other more experimental devices available, such as the fire piston and the instantaneous light box.

A London street seller of matches for tinderboxes in 1821

In the 18th and early 19th century tinderboxes were in common use, but with the advent of John Walker's 'friction lights' in 1827, where a match could be struck by withdrawing it from a piece of folded glass paper, tinderboxes increasingly became obsolete. A book from 1881 notes that in 1834 a magazine editor had predicted that despite the advent of 'lucifers' (friction matches), the tinderbox would continue to be in general use in the household, but that in fact, by the time of writing, the tinderbox had become rare, expensive and was commonly seen only in museums of antiquities. Another book from 1889 describes such a tinderbox, observing that the wear patterns on the flint were the same as those on ancient prehistoric flints in the collection.

== Use ==
In use the flint was struck in a vigorous downward motion against the steel, sending a shower of sparks into the tinder which was arranged in the bottom of the box. The sparks (actually pieces of burning steel broken off by the harder flint) created very small embers as they fell onto the charcloth, the glow of which, with some gentle blowing, would be enough to ignite a sulfur tipped wooden splint. The splint could then be carried to a candle, often set in a holder on the top of the box, and finally the cloth would be extinguished with a damper to preserve it for further use. With skill, a fire could be started in under a minute, but at other times it took longer and occasionally a tiny pinch of gunpowder was added to encourage the process.

== As metaphor ==
In conventional usage, the term "tinderbox" refers to something that is so dry that it could catch on fire with the slightest provocation, perhaps even spontaneously. It is also used to describe a potentially volatile or violent person or situation: for instance, an agitated or unstable individual, or a prison in which there is feverish unrest.

== See also ==
- Chuckmuck
- Fire striker
