= Fire striker =

Carbon steel for making sparks

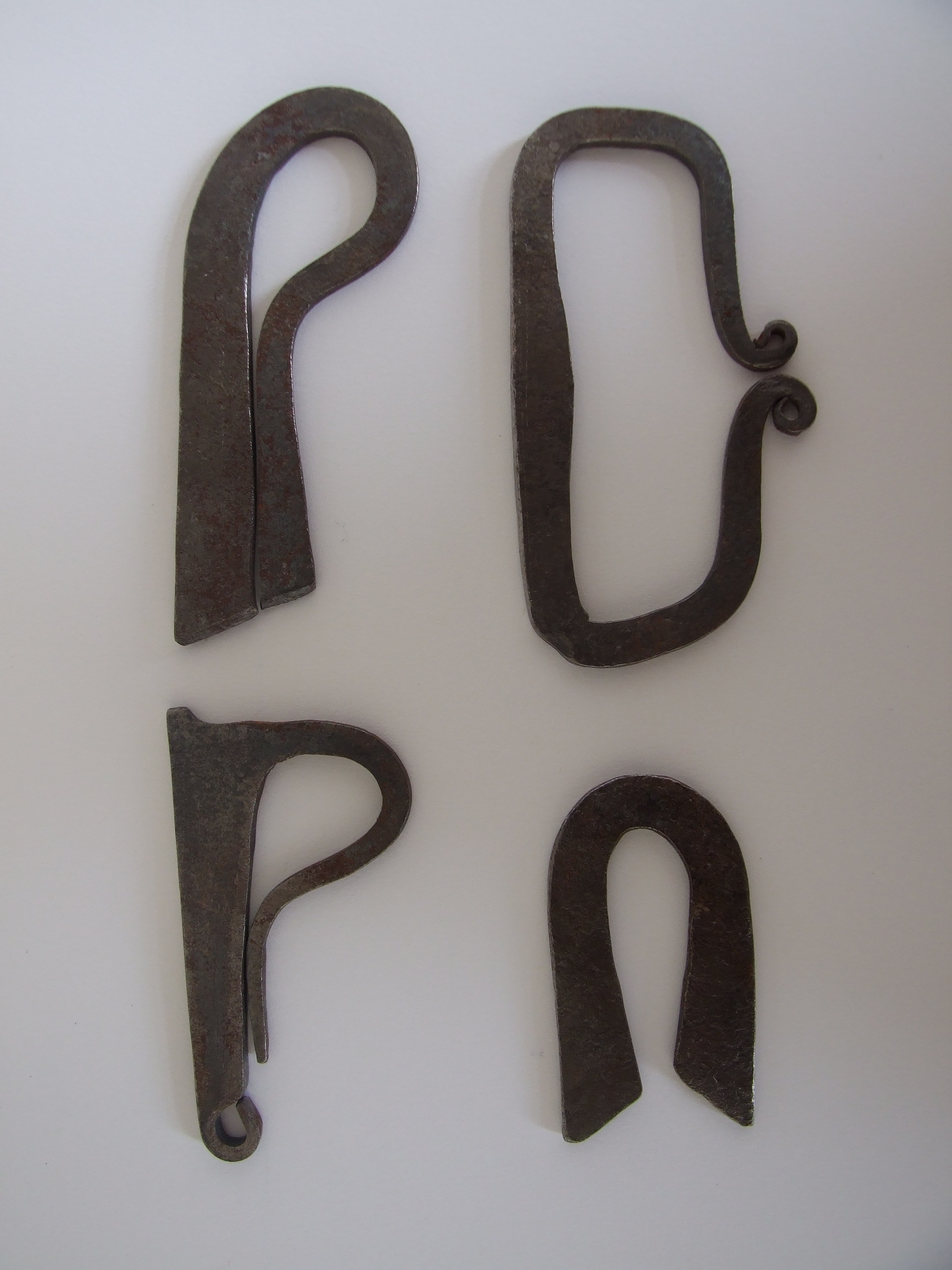
Assorted reproduction fire steels typical of the ancient and medieval periods

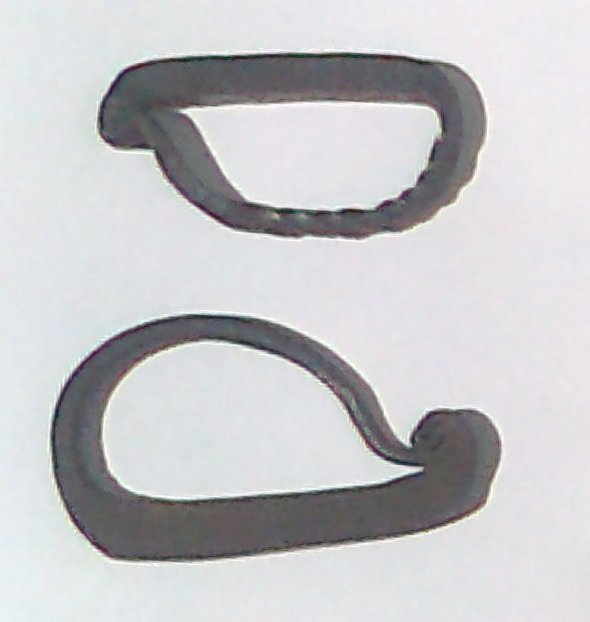
Late 18th-century fire steels from Brittany

A fire striker or fire steel is a tool used in fire making, consisting of a piece of steel that can be struck against a flint, chert, or other hard rock in order to generate sparks.

== History ==
Before the invention of matches, percussion fire making was often used to start fires. Before the advent of steel, a variety of iron pyrite or marcasite was used with flint and other stones to produce a high-temperature spark that could be used to create fire. There are indications that the Iceman, also known as Ötzi, may have used iron pyrite to make fire. From the Iron Age forward, until the invention of the friction match in 1826 by John Walker, the use of flints and steels was widespread. The fire steel was often kept in a metal tinderbox, together with flint and tinder. In Tibet and Mongolia, they were instead carried in a leather pouch called a chuckmuck.

In Japan, percussion fire making was performed using agate or even quartz. It was also used as a ritual to bring good luck or ward off evil. Ninjas used an Uchitake (打竹).

== Uses ==
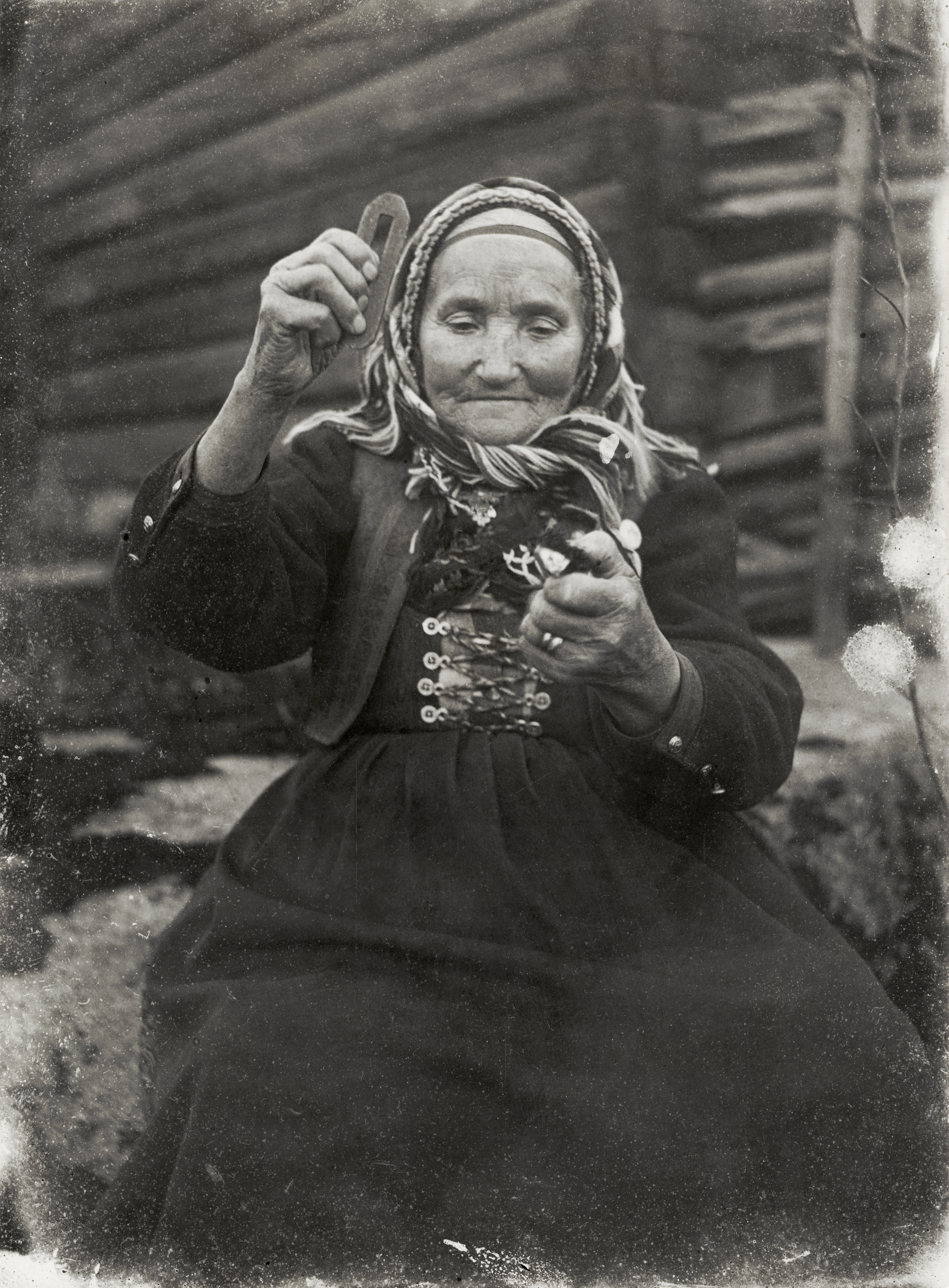
Fire striker and flint used in Dalarna, Sweden, in 1916

The type and hardness of steel used is important. High-carbon steels (1060, W1, tool steels, etc.) generate sparks easily. Iron and alloys (like stainless steel, 5160, etc.) are more difficult and generate fewer sparks. The steel must be hardened but softer than the flint-like material striking off the spark. Old files, leaf and coil springs, and rusty gardening tools are often repurposed as strikers.

Besides flint, other hard, non-porous rocks that can take a sharp edge can be used, such as chert, quartz, agate, jasper or chalcedony.

The sharp edge of the flint is used to violently strike the fire steel at an acute angle in order to cleave or shave off small particles of metal. The pyrophoricity of the steel results in the shavings oxidising in the air. The molten, oxidising sparks then ignite tinder. The tinder is best held next to the flint while the steel striker is quickly slid down against the flint, casting sparks into the tinder. Char cloth or amadou ("tinder fungus") is often used to catch the low-temperature sparks, which can then be brought to other, heavier tinder and blown into flame.

== See also ==
- Chuckmuck
- Coat of arms of Serbia (uses fire striker symbols as charges)
- Fire piston
- Ferrocerium
- Order of the Golden Fleece (whose collar consists of fire steels linked by flints)
- Coat of arms of Porvoo (featuring a single C-shaped firesteel).
