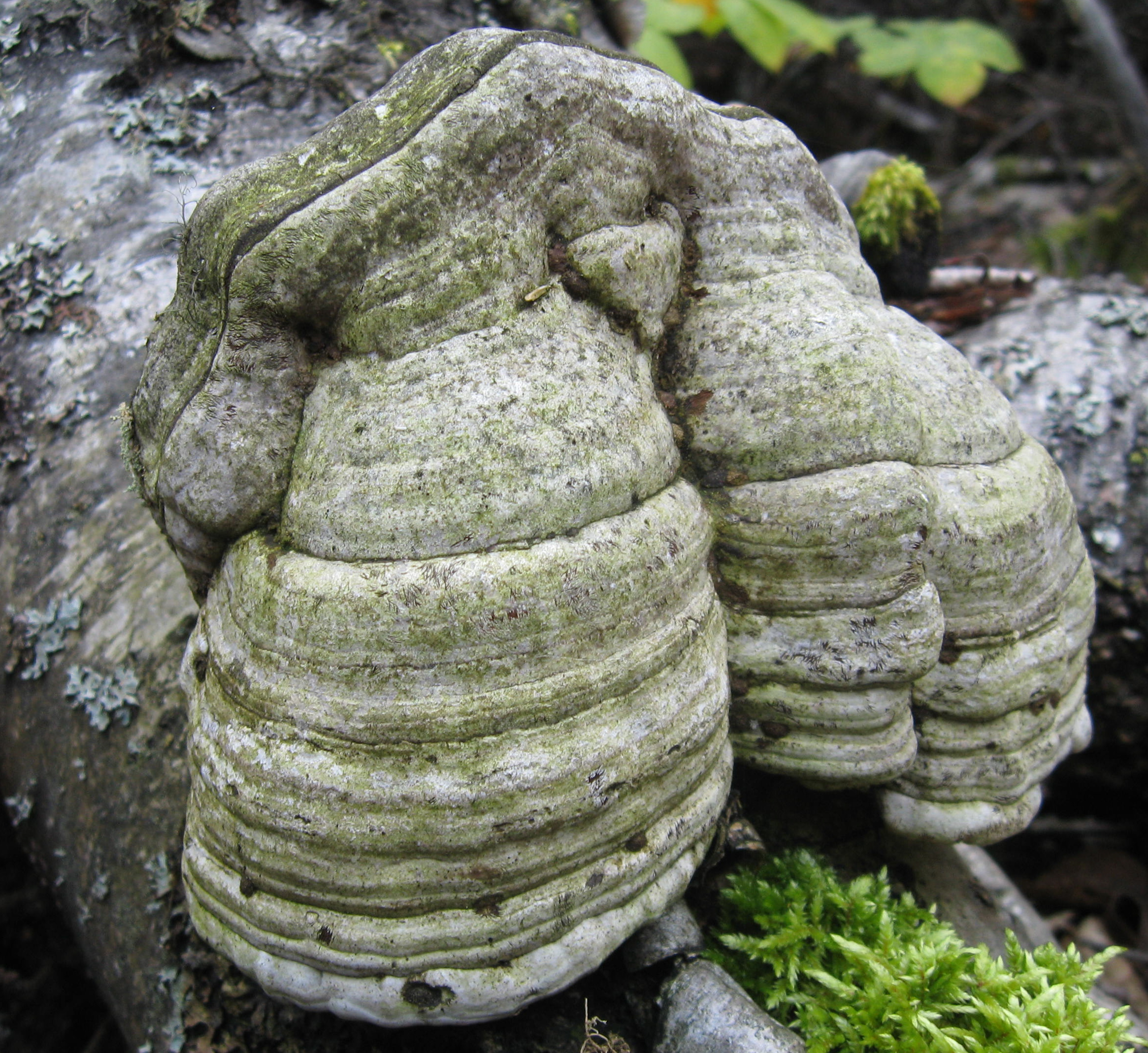
- Fomes fomentarius

Scientific classification
- Kingdom: Fungi
- Division: Basidiomycota
- Class: Agaricomycetes
- Order: Polyporales
- Family: Polyporaceae
- Genus: Fomes (Fr.) Fr. (1849)

Type species
- Fomes fomentarius (L.) Fr. (1849)

= Fomes =

Genus of fungi

Fomes is a genus of perennial woody fungi in the family Polyporaceae. Species are typically hoof-shaped (ungulate). New growth each season is added to the margin, resulting in a downward extension of the hymenium. This often results in a zonate appearance of the upper surface, that is, marked by concentric bands of color.

The name comes from Latin fomes, meaning "tinder", from the use of Fomes fomentarius, also known as the tinder fungus, in making tinder (see amadou).

== Taxonomy ==
Fomes was first introduced by Elias Magnus Fries as a subgenus of Polyporus in his 1836 work Genera Hymenomycetum. He promoted it to generic status in 1849.

== Description and ecology ==
Fomes species have perennial, hoof-shaped fruit bodies that attach directly to their substrate without a stipe. The cap surface has a hard smooth crust that ranges in colour from gray to blackish. On the underside of the cap, the pore surface is pale brown with small pores, and brown tube layers. The tough and fibrous context is pale brown. The fruit body becomes stratified after multiple years of growth. Fomes has a trimitic hyphal system, containing generative, skeletal, and binding hyphae. The generative hyphae have clamp connections, while binding and skeletal hyphae have pale brownish pigment that appears when they are mounted in a solution of potassium hydroxide. The cystidioles are fusoid, imbedded, or project somewhat. The basidia (spore-bearing cells) are club-shaped with a basal clamp, and have four sterigmata. The spores are cylindric, large, hyaline and smooth, and are non-reactive to Melzer's reagent.

Fomes fungi are among the food recorded for the pleasing fungus beetle genus Megalodacne. A possible Fomes (but the identification was very uncertain) was also once recorded in association with the little-known pleasing fungus beetle Haematochiton elateroides; however, it is suspected that these beetles were not feeding on the fungus, but simply hibernating in the dead log on which it grew.

== Species ==
As of June 2017, Index Fungorum accepts 59 species of Fomes:

- Fomes abramsianus (Murrill) Murrill (1915)
- Fomes ajazii S.M.Hussain (1952)
- Fomes albescens (Lázaro Ibiza) Sacc. & Trotter (1925)
- Fomes albogriseus Peck (1903)
- Fomes albotextus Lloyd (1924) – Sumatra
- Fomes angulus Lloyd (1913)
- Fomes aratus Sacc. & D.Sacc. (1905)
- Fomes arctostaphyli Long (1917)
- Fomes auriscalpioides Henn. (1904)
- Fomes bomfimensis Henn. (1904)
- Fomes borealis Lloyd (1915)
- Fomes borneoensis (Lloyd) S.Ahmad (1956)
- Fomes bossardii Lucien (1923)
- Fomes chaquensis Iaconis & J.E.Wright (1953)
- Fomes clelandii Lloyd (1915)
- Fomes congoanus Bres. (1913)
- Fomes crispus Lázaro Ibiza (1917)
- Fomes extensus (Lév.) Cooke (1885 – Uganda)
- Fomes fasciatus (Sw.) Cooke (1885)
- Fomes ferrugineobrunneus Cout. (1925)
- Fomes fomentarius (L.) Fr. (1849) – widespread
- Fomes fulvellus (Bres.) Sacc. (1891)
- Fomes fulvus (Scop.) Gillet (1878)
- Fomes goethartii Bres. (1910)
- Fomes griseus Lázaro Ibiza (1916)
- Fomes haeuslerianus Henn. (1896)
- Fomes halconensis Bres. (1912)
- Fomes hemitephrus (Berk.) Cooke (1885) – Australia

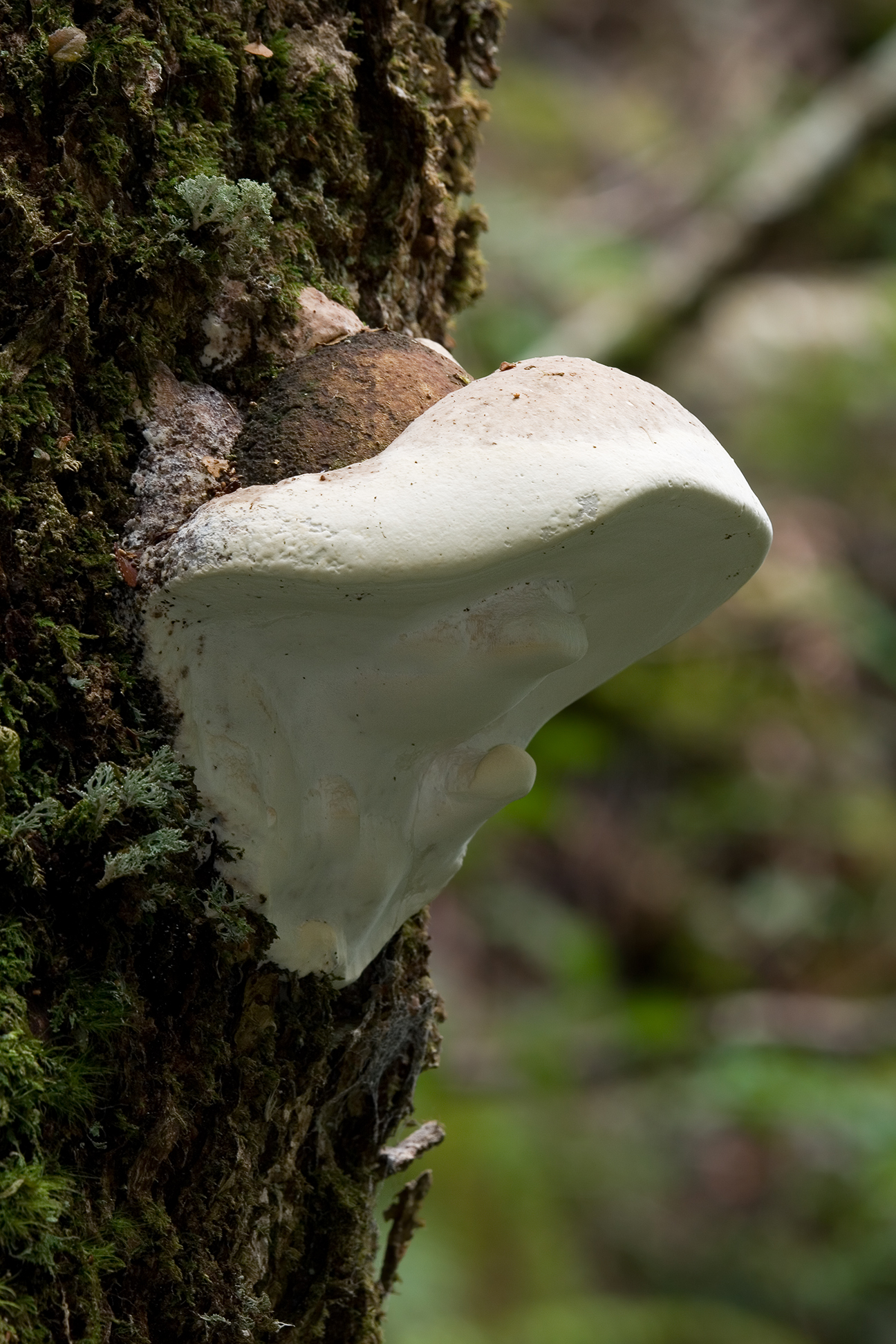
Fomes hemitephrus photographed in Tasmania

- Fomes idahoensis R.W.Br. (1940)
- Fomes imitator Petch (1922)
- Fomes javanicus Bres. (1912)
- Fomes langloisii (Murrill) Sacc. & D.Sacc. (1905)
- Fomes lazaroi Sacc. & Trotter (1925)
- Fomes longinquus Lloyd (1925)
- Fomes lukinsii N.Walters (1962)
- Fomes meliae (Underw.) Murrill (1903) – British Virgin Islands
- Fomes minimus N.Walters (1962) – Lord Howe Island
- Fomes mirabilis C.B.Ussher (1911)
- Fomes nigrescens Lloyd (1915)
- Fomes nigriporus Lázaro Ibiza (1916)
- Fomes nigrolaccatus (Cooke) Sacc. (1888)
- Fomes niveus (Lázaro Ibiza) Sacc. & Trotter (1925)
- Fomes noscius Corner (1932)
- Fomes obesus (Pat.) Sacc. & Trotter (1912)
- Fomes ostricolor Lloyd (1915)
- Fomes pachyderma Bres. (1912)
- Fomes perelegans Rick (1960)
- Fomes pini-canadensis (Schwein.) Cooke (1885)
- Fomes praerimosus (Murrill) Sacc. & D.Sacc. (1905)
- Fomes pseudoconchatus Henn. (1908)
- Fomes pseudosenex (Murrill) Sacc. & Trotter (1912) – Mauritius
- Fomes pusilla Lloyd (1915)
- Fomes rechingeri Bres. (1910)
- Fomes silveirae Torrend (1909)
- Fomes subamboinensis Henn. (1904)
- Fomes subendothejus Bres. (1910)
- Fomes subzonatus (Lázaro Ibiza) Sacc. & Trotter (1925)
- Fomes unciatus Bres. (1922)
- Fomes uncinatus Bres. (1922)
