= Fire piston =

Tool for kindling a fire

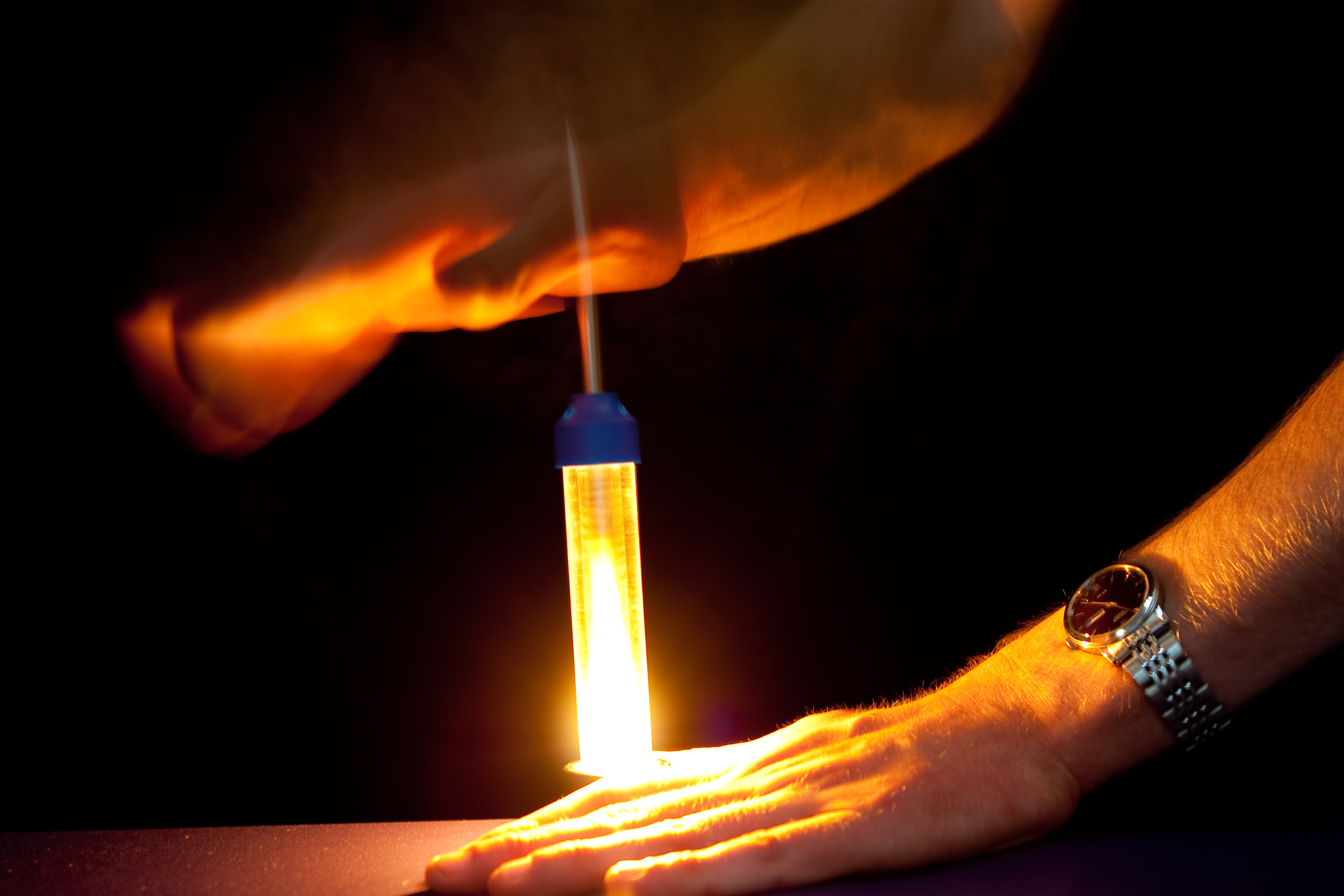
Demonstration of a fire piston

A fire piston, sometimes called a fire syringe or a slam rod fire starter, is a device of ancient Southeast Asian origin which is used to kindle fire. It uses the principle of the heating of a gas (in this case air) by rapid and adiabatic compression to ignite a piece of tinder, which is then used to set light to kindling.

== Description and use ==
Modern fire piston made from 1/2" PVC pipe, wood dowel, and rubber O-ring

A fire piston consists of a hollow cylinder sealed at one end and open at the other. Sizes range in length from 3 to 6 inches (7.5 to 15 cm) with a bore about 0.25 inch (6–7 mm) in diameter, to 10 to 14 inches (25 to 35 cm) with a bore about 0.5 inch (14 mm) in diameter. A piston with an airtight circular seal is fitted into the cylinder. A string packing lubricated with water or rubber gasket lubricated with grease is used to create an air-tight but slippery seal. At the end of the piston a small cavity is made, where tinder can be inserted without it being crushed during subsequent operations. The piston can be completely withdrawn from the cylinder for installation or removal of the tinder.

The piston (or cylinder) has a handle on the end to allow a firm grip to be applied to it, or a large enough surface area to strike it sharply without causing pain, while the cylinder (or piston) is braced or slammed against a hard surface. The compression of the air when the piston is quickly forced into the cylinder causes the interior temperature to rise sharply to over 400 °F (260 °C), the autoignition temperature of tinder. This is hot enough for the tinder in the piston face to ignite with a visible flash that can be seen, if the cylinder is made of translucent or transparent material. The piston is then quickly withdrawn, before the now-burning tinder depletes the available oxygen inside the cylinder. The smouldering tinder can then be removed from the face of the piston and transferred to a larger nest of tinder material. The ember is then fanned or blown upon vigorously to create a flame, at which time various stages of larger kindling can be added until built into a full-scale fire.

Ancient and modern versions of fire pistons have been made from wood, animal horns, antlers, bamboo, or metal. Today, fire pistons are commonly constructed from wood, metal, or plastic. Do-it-yourself designs have become available using wood dowels, PVC and copper pipe, and rubber O-rings, to build versions costing less than $2 USD each.

== Principle of operation ==
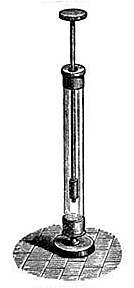
A 19th-century glass-cylinder fire syringe with a metal piston to which the tinder is attached

Rapid compression of a gas increases its pressure and its temperature at the same time. If this compression is done too slowly the heat will dissipate to the surroundings as the gas returns to thermal equilibrium with them. If the compression is done quickly enough, then there is no time for thermal equilibrium to be achieved. The absolute temperature of the gas can suddenly become much higher than that of its surroundings, increasing from the original room temperature of the gas to a temperature hot enough to set tinder alight. The air in the cylinder acts both as a source of heat and as an oxidizer for the tinder fuel.

The same principle is used in the diesel engine to ignite the fuel in the cylinder, eliminating the need for a spark plug as used in the gasoline engine. The principle of operation is closer to the hot bulb engine, an early antecedent to the diesel, since the fuel (tinder) is compressed with the gas, while in a diesel the fuel is injected when the gas is already compressed and at a high temperature.

Fire pistons have a compression ratio of about 25 to 1. This compares with about 20:1 for a modern diesel engine, and between 7:1 and 11.5:1 for a gasoline engine. The fire piston is made deliberately narrow so that unaided human strength can exert enough force to compress the air in the cylinder to its fullest extent. To achieve a high compression ratio, the final compressed volume of the tinder and air must be small relative to that of the length of the piston tube. These two factors together mean that only a tiny amount of tinder can be lit by a fire piston, but this can be sufficient to light other tinder, and in turn to light a larger fire.

Tinders that ignite at a very low temperature work best. Easily-combustible materials such as char cloth or amadou work well as tinder, and can also hold an ember. By contrast, cotton fibers ignite at 455 °F (235 °C) and will flash brightly but do not hold an ember. The bright flash of light is sometimes sufficient for demonstration purposes, but will not start a persistent fire.

The construction of a hand-operated pump, such as an ordinary bicycle pump, is very similar except that the pump also has valves and a hose to deliver compressed air as an output. In the case of the pump, the heating of the compressed air is an undesired side effect. In both fire piston and pumps, the mechanism and lubricants must be chosen to resist high peak temperatures and pressures.

== History ==
=== Southeast Asia and Madagascar ===
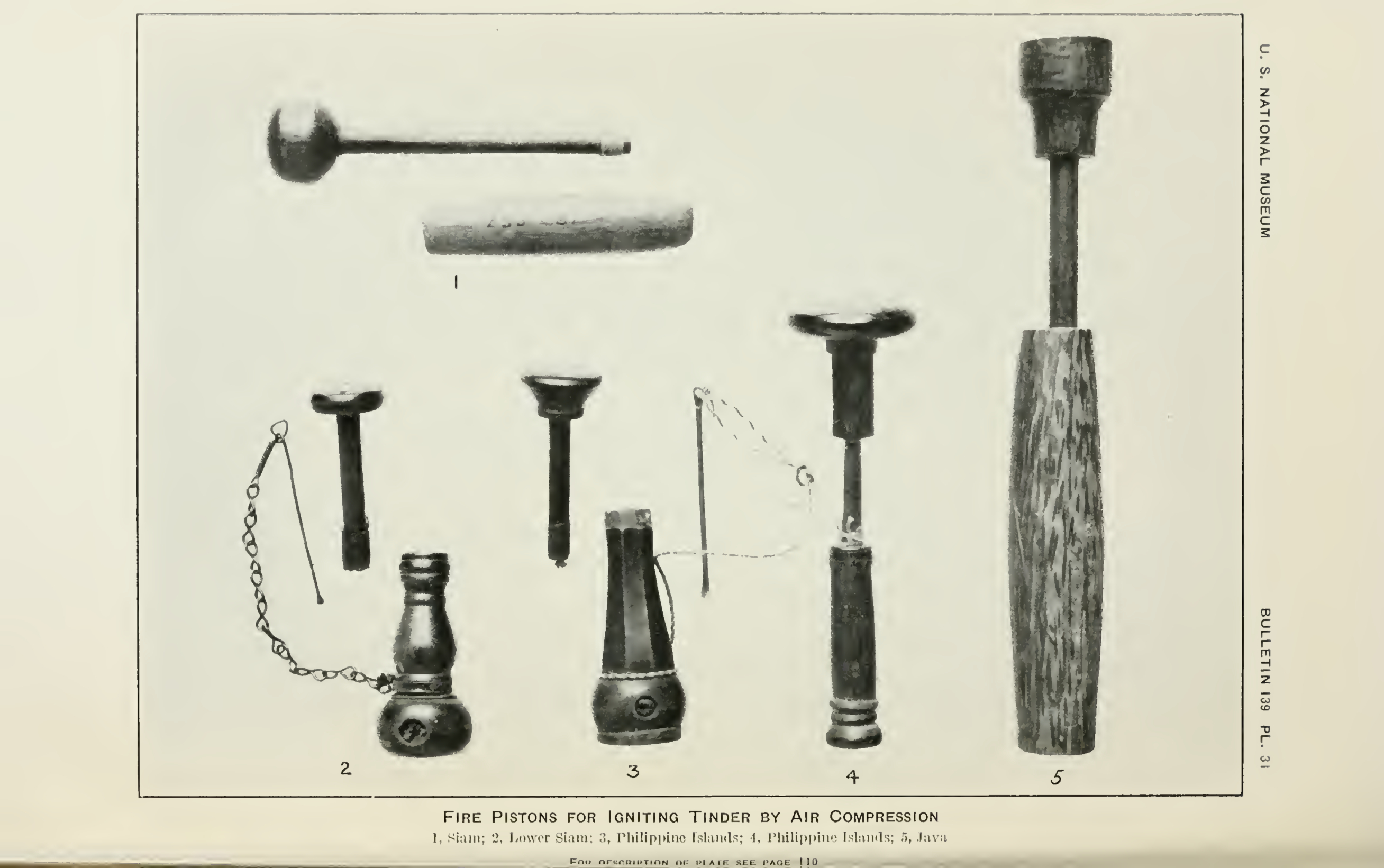
Fire pistons from Thailand (1,2); the Philippines (3,4); and Java, Indonesia (5)

Fire pistons were invented by Southeast Asians (probably the Austronesian peoples). Their use was mostly concentrated in the Austronesian regions, particularly in the Malay Peninsula, the Philippines, Borneo, Sumatra, Java, some of the islands east of Java including Flores, and in Madagascar. They are also found in Myanmar, Thailand, and Laos in Mainland Southeast Asia.

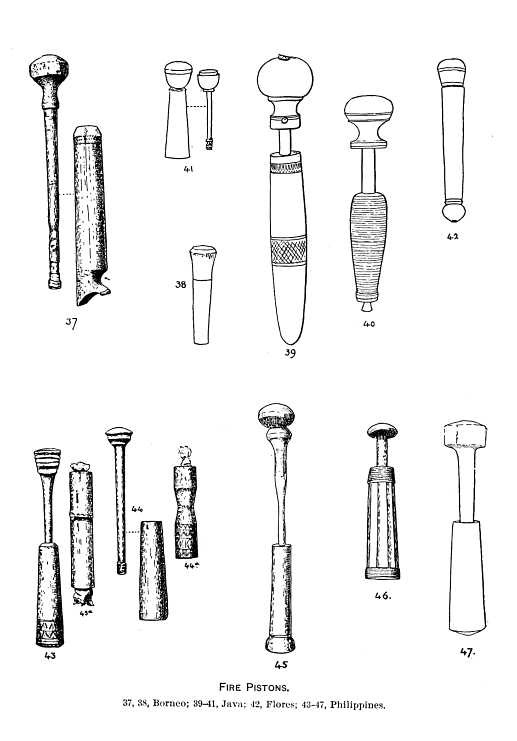
19th to early 20th century fire pistons from Borneo (27, 28); Java (29-41); Flores (42); and the Philippines (43-47)

Fire pistons in Southeast Asia were variously constructed of bamboo, wood, metal, ivory, bone, and horn. The main tube was typically around 3.25 in (8.3 cm) long and 0.5 in (1.3 cm) in diameter, with a bore size around 0.375 in (0.95 cm). The end of the tube usually flared out into a small cavity used for holding tinder. The tinder used was typically obtained from the leaf bases of palm trees and rattan vines and were usually stored in a tinder box carried along with the piston. They were known as lek phai tok in Thai; gobek api in Malay (lit. 'fire mortar and pestle'); and sulpakan or sumpak in Tagalog; among other names.

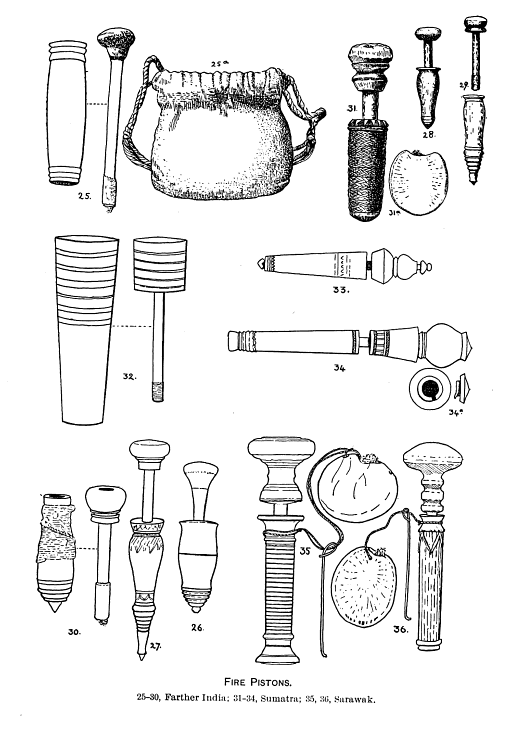
19th to early 20th century fire pistons and tinder pouches from the Khmu people of Laos (25); the Thai Malays of southern Thailand (25 -31); the Minangkabau people of Sumatra (32-34); and the Iban people of Sarawak, Borneo (35,36)

The antiquity of the fire piston in Southeast Asia is unknown, but it definitely pre-dated the Austronesian colonization of Madagascar (c. 100–500 AD). It was one of the early definite proofs linking Madagascar with a Southeast Asian origin.

The principles governing fire pistons were also used to construct Southeast Asian piston bellows with bamboo. These piston bellows could pump sufficient air into a furnace to produce temperatures high enough to melt metal, which led to the independent development of sophisticated bronze and iron metallurgy in Southeast Asia starting at around 1500 BC. Particularly in the development of bronze gongs (e.g. from the Dong Son culture) that were then exported in the ancient maritime trade networks of Southeast Asia. These piston-bellows reached as far as Madagascar prior to European contact. The bamboo piston-bellows technology was also adopted early by the Chinese, replacing the indigenous Chinese leather-bellows technology completely. Piston bellows were also introduced to Japan.

Whether the European fire pistons were influenced by the Southeast Asian fire pistons was a matter of debate. But Balfour (1908) and Fox (1969) have demonstrated convincingly that the European fire pistons were independently discovered via air guns. Fox, however, tries to argue that the Southeast Asian fire pistons were introduced from Europe, but this is rejected as unconvincing by other scholars. The presence of derivative piston-bellows technology and the existence of fire pistons even in isolated and widely separated cultures, like the Kachin of northern Burma and the Igorot of highland Luzon, makes it definitely known that Southeast Asian fire pistons existed long before the European versions.

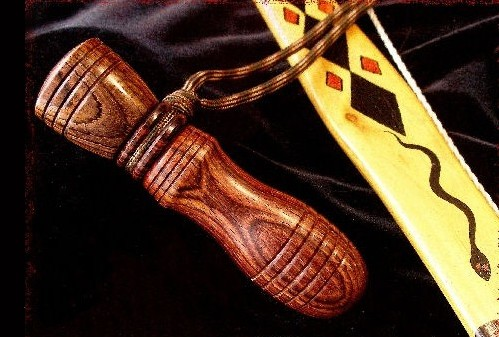
Modern replica of a Southeast Asian fire piston made from cocobolo

Despite the independent invention of European fire pistons, it was the Southeast Asian fire pistons that inspired Rudolf Diesel in his creation of the diesel engine at around 1892, not the European versions (which had largely been replaced by matches by the late 19th century). Diesel was a student of the inventor Carl von Linde. He acquired the idea of the internal combustion engine after he witnessed Linde light a cigarette with a fire piston. This fire piston was acquired by Linde from Southeast Asia during a lecture in Penang.

A Philippine fire piston (sulpakan) made of carabao horn was also among the anthropological items sent by José Rizal (a Filipino revolutionary hero) to Adolf Bastian in 1888 for the collections of the Ethnological Museum of Berlin. It was accompanied by a drawing explaining its use as a fire-starter.

=== Europe ===
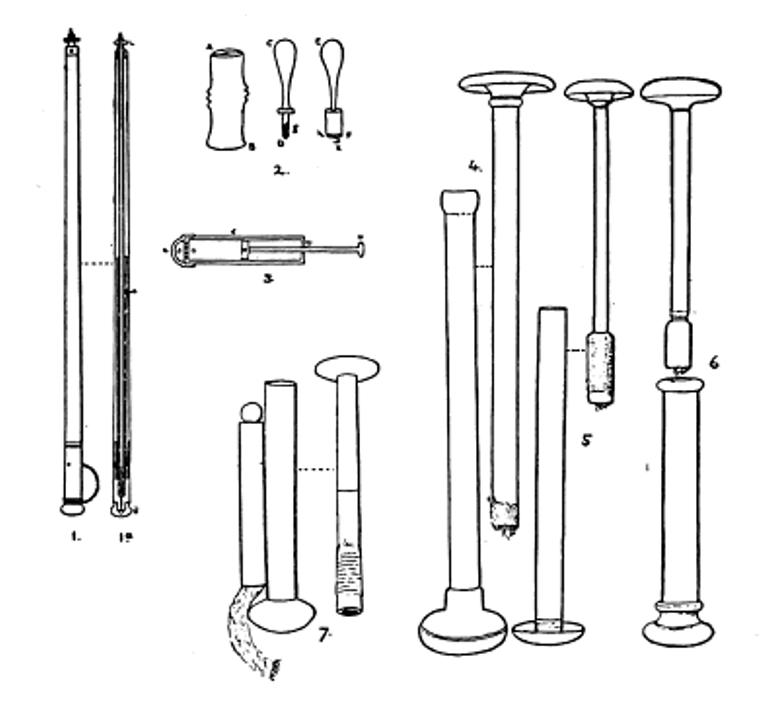
Early 19th century European fire pistons

The first known documented fire piston in the West was made in 1745 by the Abbot Agostino Ruffo of Verona, Italy, who was making a pair of air guns for the king of Portugal, John V. While Ruffo was testing a gun's air pump for leaks by plugging its outlet with a scrap of wood, he noticed that, after he had pressurized the pump, the wood had been scorched. Subsequently, he found that tinder was ignited by the pump. Ruffo made an apparatus to study the phenomenon further, but his invention was not popularized.

It is recorded that the first fire piston made its wider debut in front of scientists in 1802, and it was patented in 1807 simultaneously in both England and France. Fire pistons, or "fire syringes" as they were called then, enjoyed a brief period of popularity in parts of Europe during the early nineteenth century, until being displaced by the friction match invented in 1826.

In the US, descriptions have been published for many years.

== See also ==
- Fire striker
- Firelighting
- Flame holder
- Luthang, a Filipino bamboo children's toy gun using the same principle and construction

== General and cited references ==
- Arbor Scientific, Tools That Teach, Fire Syringe P1-2020
- Balfour, Henry (1907). "The fire piston," Annual Report of the Board of Regents of the Smithsonian Institution, pp. 565–598.
- Fox, Robert (July 1969). "The Fire Piston and Its Origins in Europe", Technology and Culture, 10 (3) : 355–370.
- Jamison (1994). The Remarkable Firepiston Woodsmoke. Menasha Ridge Press, Birmingham AL ISBN 0-89732-151-0
- Jamison, Richard with Mel Deweese (2007), "The remarkable fire piston" in: Richard and Linda Jamison, Primitive Skills and Crafts: An outdoorsman's guide to shelters, tools, weapons, tracking, survival, and more (New York: Skyhorse Publishing, ), pp. 163–176.
- Rowlands, John J. (1947) The Cache Lake Country; New York: W. W. Norton and Company.
