= Sumpak =

Sumpak may refer to:

- an improvised firearm used in the Philippines
- a traditional bamboo toy gun used in the Philippines
- a fire piston, a device used to kindle a fire
