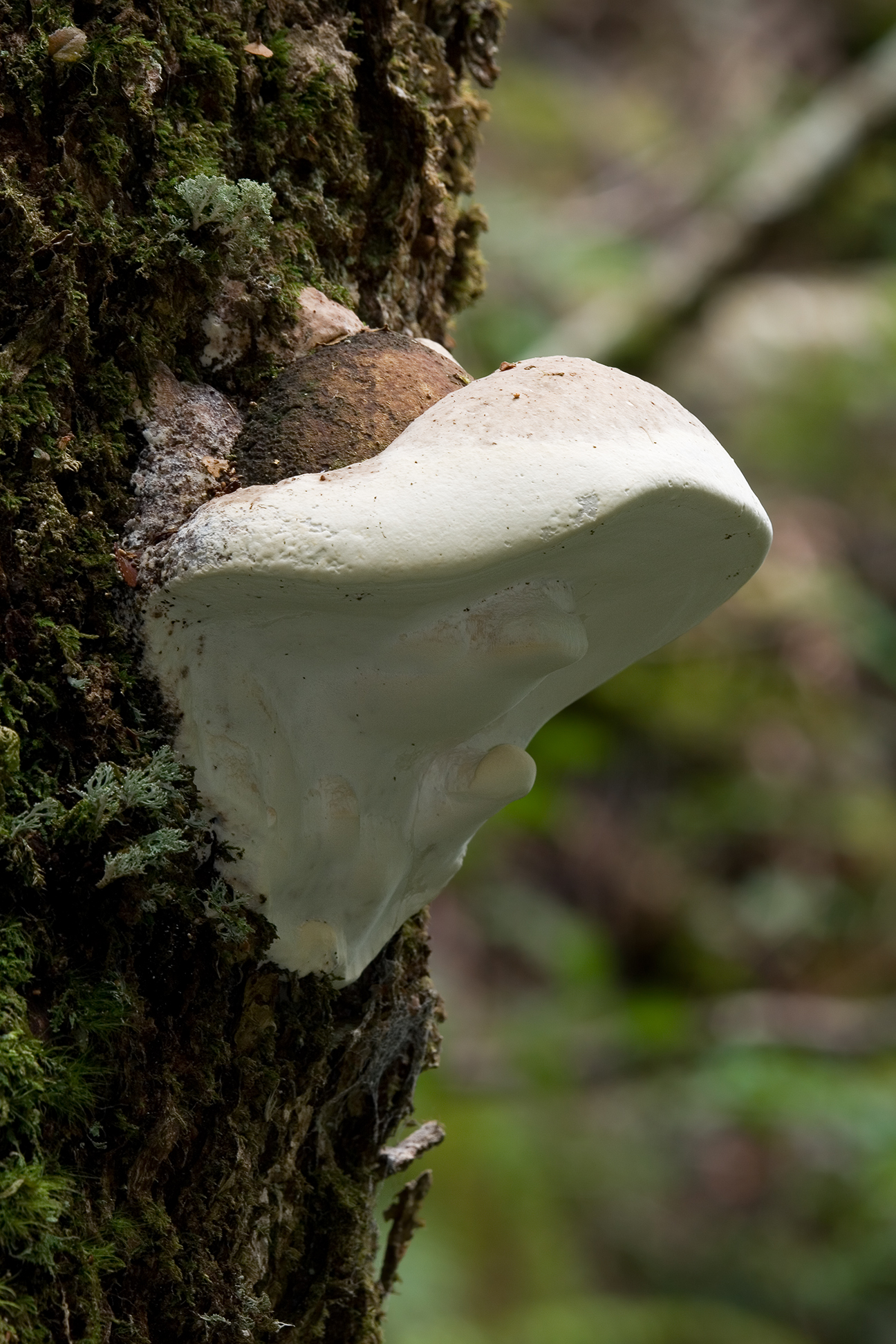

Scientific classification
- Domain: Eukaryota
- Kingdom: Fungi
- Division: Basidiomycota
- Class: Agaricomycetes
- Order: Polyporales
- Family: Polyporaceae
- Genus: Fomes
- Species: F. hemitephrus

Binomial name
- Fomes hemitephrus (Berk.) Cooke (1885)

Synonyms
- Polyporus hemitephrus Berk. (1855)

= Fomes hemitephrus =

Species of fungus

Fomes hemitephrus is a bracket fungus in the family Polyporaceae. First named Polyporus hemitephrus by English naturalist Miles Joseph Berkeley in 1855, it was given its current name by the English mycologist Mordecai Cubitt Cooke in 1885. The species is found in Australia and New Zealand, and is one of the most common polypores in those countries, causing a white rot on several tree species.

Historically, Fomes hemitephrus has been placed in several different genera, including Fomitopsis, Heterobasidion, and Trametes.
