= Chuckmuck =

Tinder pouch with a striking plate

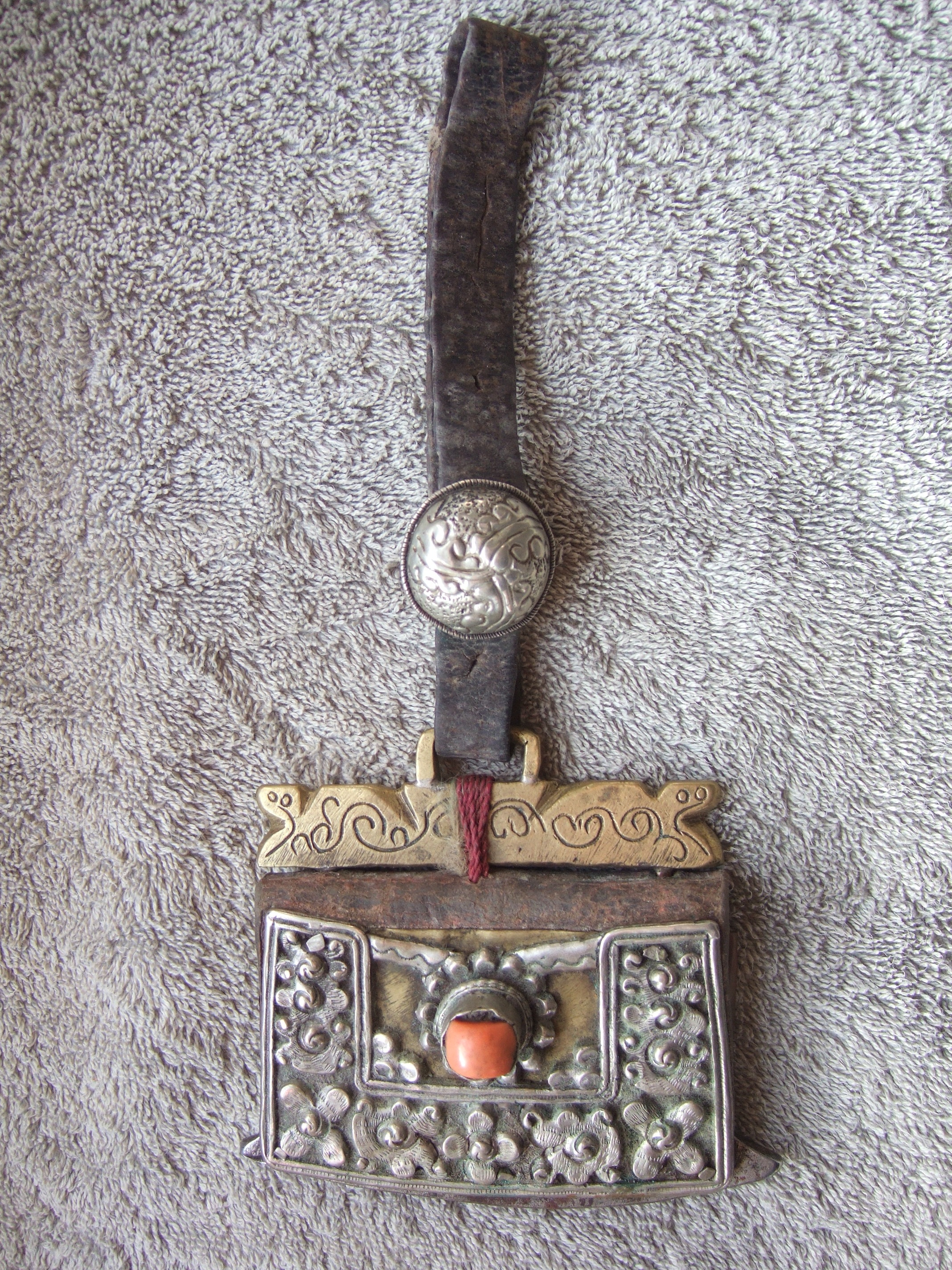
Tibetan flint pouch

A chuckmuck is a belt-hung leather and metal decorated tinder pouch with an attached thin long striking plate, found across North Asia and China to Japan from at least the 17th century. Chuckmucks form a well-marked group within flint-and-steel types of fire-lighting kit, still used as jewellery amongst Tibetans (mechag) and Mongolians (kete). This large distinctive style of a worldwide daily utensil was noted in Victorian British India and the 1880s Anglo-Indian word chuckmuck (derived from chakmak) was adopted into specialist English by the early 20th century.

== Description ==
The chuckmuck is constructed from a stiff leather purse with a thick curved steel striker attached by rivets to its base. The sides and flap of the purse are either sewn or fixed by ornamental metal plates or small plaques. Inside are kept a piece of flint and a little tinder (pulped woody material such as plant roots). On the top fold a thin metal plate with 1 - 3 small hooks allow the pouch to be hung from the belt with a chuckmuck strap: a chain, leather thong or embroidered cloth.

Chuckmucks vary in size and decoration, with the circular boss in the centre of the flap, which operates as a hook to keep the purse closed, sometimes being decorated by a semi-precious stone such as coral or turquoise. Other decorations on the mounts are in silver, brass or iron with geometric patterns, floral designs, Tibetan motifs, or in the animal style. The steel striker is occasionally engraved: with two dragons or Chinese characters. The University of Washington database contains a collection of fire steels, including early chuckmucks on plates 45-48 from several countries.

The chuckmuck is hung from the belt in both Mongolian and Tibetan traditional dress for men and women. For this reason, it is sometimes described as a Chatelaine (chain) with strap ornaments, as in the British Museum exhibit. It is sometimes accompanied by a 'chuckmuck purse' as a jewellery set in exactly the same style, only lacking the curved steel striker.

== History ==
The container for a flint-and-steel kit can come in two main forms: the tinderbox and the tinder pouch.

The chuckmuck design appears in many cultures from the 17th century or earlier, stretching from the Silk Road to the Himalaya and China to Japan

It is not known where or when the design originated, but it was manufactured locally in several countries in Central Asia. One known, still active, hub of metalwork was the area between Lanzhou, Xining and Labrang, the NE part of Amdo which incorporates the Amdo Tibetans, some Mongol regions, the Salar, the Hui and Han Chinese. In Tibet, apart from Lhasa and a very few other towns, only Derge was renowned for the quality of its metalwork.

The 19th-century growth in museums and world expositions in several countries led to many exhibits on the theme of man making fire and several of these included examples of chuckmucks. As a result, many museums and old collections contain chuckmucks; they occasionally appear in antique auctions.

In 1926 a British museum of Fire-Making Appliances catalogued 52 of these chuckmucks and illustrated 11. "Of all tinder-pouches, by far the handsomest and most interesting are those commonly known by this name, which form an exceeding well-marked group. All come from one part of the world covering Tibet, the Himalayan region, Mongolia and Northern China." The whole museum collection was transferred to the Science Museum in 1937

Museums worldwide today classify them in a variety of different ways: "pouch (tinder flint)" "tinder pouch ('mecha')" fire-striker, flint-steel set, and rarely mention the chuckmuck design to distinguish it from other pouches.

== Etymology ==
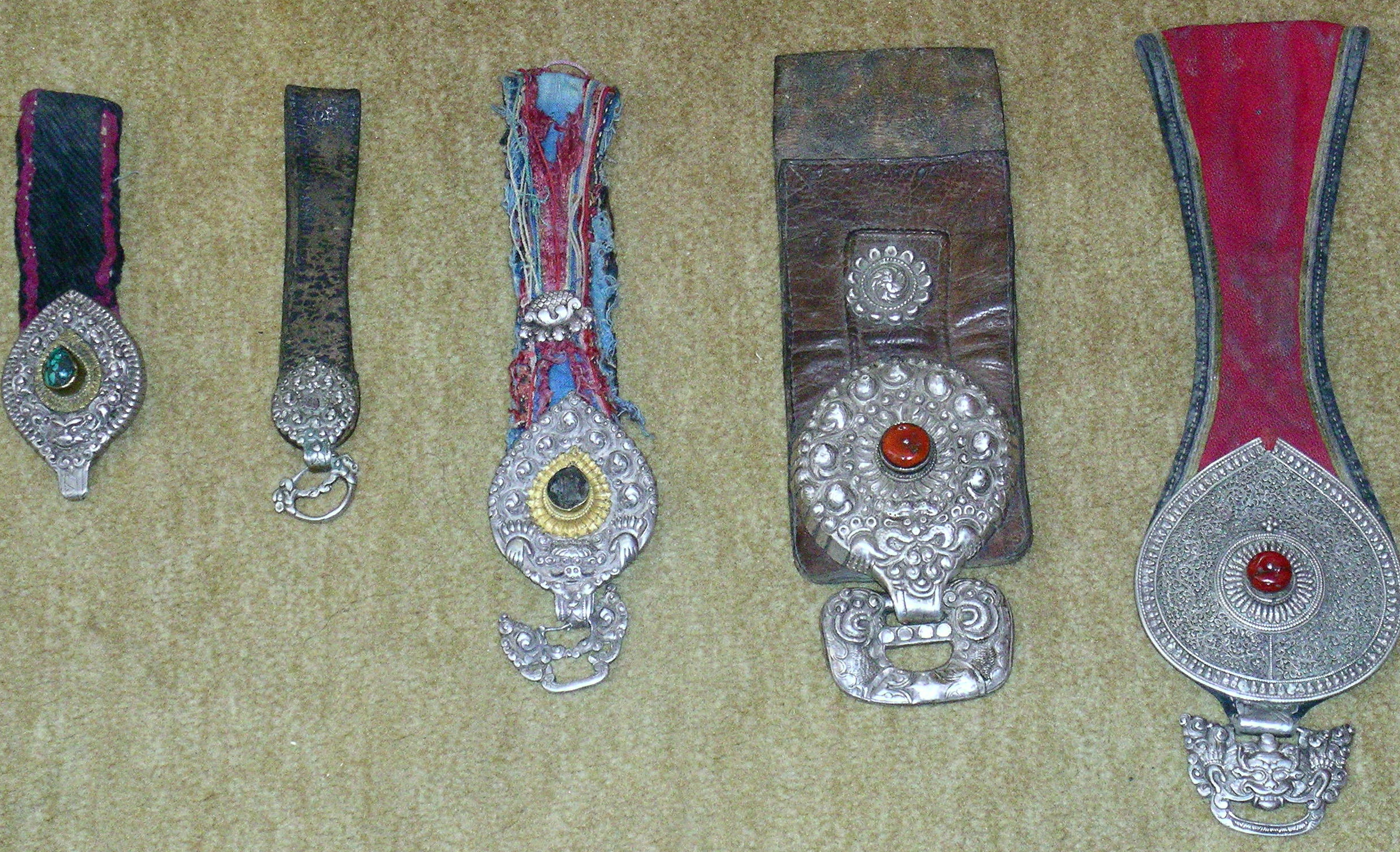
Mechag style cloth and leather belt straps for suspending chuckmucks

Chuckmuck is derived via the British Indian word chakmak from the Turkish word for flint, çakmaktaşı. This word of Turkic origin was simplified and incorporated as slang in many languages of Central Asia. When encountered in British India during contact with Himalayan Tibetan tribes, it became identified as a particular form of fire-steel - the chuckmuck. Since this coincided with the introduction of the friction match, the function of the tinderbox and tinder pouch gradually became unnecessary, and by the end of the 19th century, only its use as ethnic jewellery by Mongolians and Tibetans kept the chuckmuck in daily use.

=== Chuckmuck ===
For a few decades in mid 19th century, chuckmuck and chakmak were used almost interchangeably as the ‘Indian’ word for any type of fire-steel.

The first known use of the word chuckmuck comes from 1843 from British India: “the coolness of the British soldier is shewn by his sitting down and lighting his chuckmuck and enjoying the solace of his pipe while the arrows of death were bustling around his ears”.

In central India, north west of Mumbai, a British officer describes a local guide: “Round his waist was a broad leather belt, hung round with numerous pouches… and a chuckmuck, or leather bag, with flint, steel and tinder.” This would best be described as a tinder pouch, and, that of the pipe smoking soldiers a simple metal tube with striker.

A camping book in 1871 details "a very convenient and portable means of carrying fire, sold under the name of "strike-a-light" or "chuckmuck"; it is formed of a brass tube of 1in. caliber and 3in. in length, which has a cap and a sliding bottom to it : it is filled of tinder….it contains also a gun flint or bit of agate, and its chain passes through an oval of steel or case-hardened iron” costing around a shilling - clearly one of the plethora of short-lived metal tinderbox designs.

However, after the 1889 publication of Hindu-koh by Donald Macintyre (VC), a prominent British Gurkha officer, containing the first known illustration and description of a chuckmuck, the word became more strictly defined in academic circles. Macintyre actually made his hunting trip, on which the book is based, in the Himalaya in 1853-4, and was a prominent fellow of the Royal Geographical Society and other Indian societies.

The museum categorisation of chuckmuck dates from this time. After that, all academic descriptions, where they were catalogued in English, used the word to refer to the classic design of the chuckmuck. Chakmak does not appear to have been used as a descriptive term outside India.

Chuckmuck was defined as an Anglo-Indian word. It continues to be used in books in English about the history of fire-lighting.

=== Chakmak ===
Catholic missionaries had a presence in Western Tibet from 1624 to 1640. The initial reports of the Jesuit António de Andrade, including dictionaries, were supplemented by many others in the 19th century on the eastern fringes of the Tibetan plateau, leading to an 1899 dictionary citing lcags ma and lcags mag, pronounced as chagmag, as vulgar slang for me lcags, itself often transliterated as mechag.

In Nepal, a traditional kukri features two little knives attached at the back of the sheath. One is called a chakmak. It is blunt on both sides and it works like a knife sharpener or when struck on a limestone creates sparks to start fire.

Chakmak, as an Indian word, was widely used in reports and books in British India. “In Ladakh both men and women wore in their waste-clothes or girdles a chakmak (or leather case ornamented with brass, containing a flint, steel and tinder)”.

William Moorcroft, extensively catalogued the Himalayan regions around Ladakh in the 1820s, noting “Every man carries a knife hanging from his girdle, and a chakmak, or steel for striking a light”. As he was describing Tibetan dress, these were of the classic chuckmuck design.

In 1891 William Woodville Rockhill recorded some of Salar language, an archaic Turkic dialect spoken near Lanzhou between the Tibetan plateau and Mongolia. He derived the Salar word cha’-ma from Ottoman Turkish chakmak. Similarly, in Uyghur language, a Turkic language spoken in western China, the word for flint is chaqmaq teshi.

In Persian and Arabic, chakmak means "flint" or "fire-striker". An early example dated 1716 is from Persia, where the Islamic inscription reads “The fire steel (chakmak) of his heart is so filled with sparks that his charged sight intensifies the burning”

In the Kyrgyz language, as noted by an 1899 Danish expedition, the "apparatus for striking fire is called Chakmak. It is possible that flint is found by this lake of Chakmaktinkul and that the name may arise therefrom in relation to the striking of fire from flint".

=== In other languages ===
- In Mongolian, kete
- In Japanese, hiuchi-bukuro
