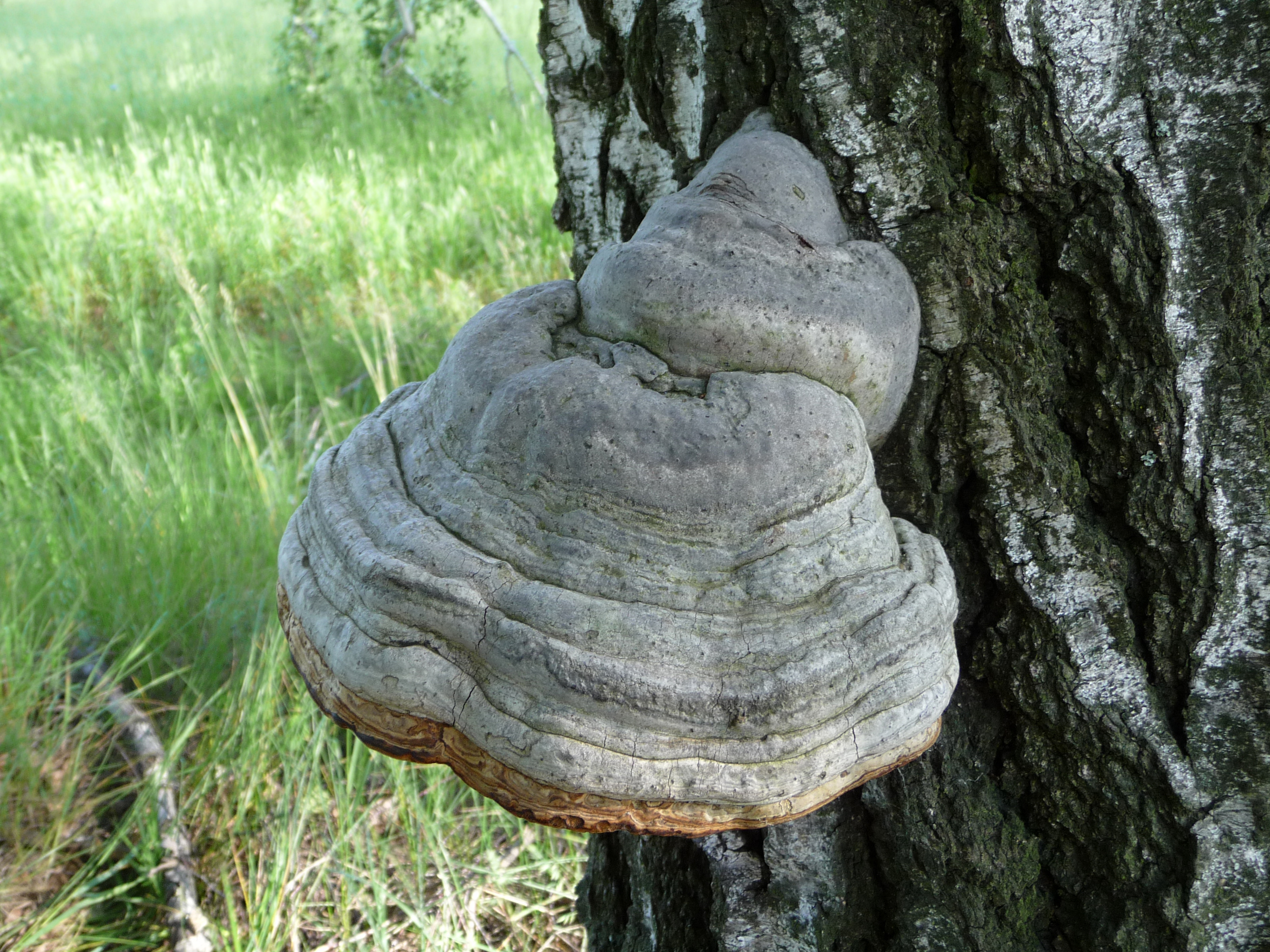

Scientific classification
- Kingdom: Fungi
- Division: Basidiomycota
- Class: Agaricomycetes
- Order: Polyporales
- Family: Polyporaceae
- Genus: Fomes
- Species: F. fomentarius

Binomial name
- Fomes fomentarius (L.) Fr. 1849

Synonyms
- Species synonymy: 1753 Boletus fomentarius L.; 1783 Agaricus fomentarius (L.) Lam.; 1789 Boletus ungulatus Bull.; 1818 Polyporus fomentarius (L.) G. Mey.; 1839 Polyporus fomentarius var. excavatus Berk.; 1861 Polyporus inzengae Ces. & De Not.; 1877 Polyporus mirus Kalchbr.; 1882 Fomes mirus (Kalchbr.) P. Karst.; 1884 Polyporus introstuppeus Berk. & Cooke; 1885 Fomes excavatus (Berk.) Cooke; 1885 Fomes introstuppeus (Berk. & Cooke) Cooke; 1885 Fomes inzengae (Ces. & De Not.) Cooke; 1886 Placodes fomentarius (L.) Quél.; 1888 Ochroporus fomentarius (L.) J. Schröt.; 1898 Scindalma fomentarium (L.) Kuntze; 1898 Scindalma introstuppeum (Berk. & Cooke) Kuntze; 1898 Scindalma mirum (Kalchbr.) Kuntze; 1900 Ungulina fomentaria (L.) Pat.; 1903 Elfvingia fomentaria (L.) Murrill; 1914 Elfvingiella fomentaria (L.) Murrill; 1915 Fomes nigrescens Lloyd; 1916 Fomes griseus Lázaro Ibiza; 1916 Ungularia populina Lázaro Ibiza; 1917 Ungularia albescens Lázaro Ibiza; 1917 Ungularia nivea Lázaro Ibiza; 1917 Ungularia subzonata Lázaro Ibiza; 1922 Polyporus fomentarius var. lineatus Velen.; 1925 Fomes albescens (Lázaro Ibiza) Sacc. & Trotter; 1925 Fomes niveus (Lázaro Ibiza) Sacc. & Trotter; 1925 Polyporus populinus (Lázaro Ibiza) Sacc. & Trotter; 1925 Fomes subzonatus Lázaro Ibiza) Sacc. & Trotter; 1963 Pyropolyporus fomentarius (L.) Teng

= Fomes fomentarius =

Species of fungus

Fomes fomentarius
- Mycological characteristics
- Pores on hymenium
- No distinct cap
- Hymenium attachment is not applicable
- Lacks a stipe
- Spore print is white
- Ecology is parasitic or saprotrophic
- Edibility is inedible

Fomes fomentarius (commonly known as the tinder fungus, false tinder fungus, hoof fungus, tinder conk, tinder polypore or ice man fungus) is a perennial wood-decay basidiomycete found in Europe, Asia, Africa and North America. The species produces large, hoof-shaped polypore fruit bodies which vary in colour from silvery grey to almost black, though they are normally brown. It develops on the trunks of various hardwood species and is associated with the development of white rot in the underlying wood. It has traditionally been described as a plant pathogen, but experimental studies have also reported its occurrence as a latent stem endophyte within apparently healthy trees.

Though inedible, F. fomentarius has traditionally seen use as the main ingredient of amadou, a material used primarily as tinder, but also used to make clothing and other items. The 5,000-year-old Ötzi carried four pieces of F. fomentarius, supposedly for tinder.

== Taxonomy ==
The first scientific description of the fungus appeared in the literature in the 1753 Species Plantarum by Carl Linnaeus; he called it Boletus fomentarius. The specific epithet fomentarius is from the Latin fomentum, referring to tinder. The species has been described as a member of numerous different genera. In 1783, Jean-Baptiste Lamarck named the species Agaricus fomentarius in his Encyclopédie Méthodique: Botanique. In 1818, Georg Friedrich Wilhelm Meyer described Polyporus fomentarius in his Primitiae Florae Essequeboensis, and this name was sanctioned by Elias Magnus Fries in the 1821 publication of the first volume of his Systema Mycologicum. Fries later, in his 1849 Summa vegetabilium Scandinaviae, moved the species to the genus Fomes. Subsequent attempts to change the genus of the species have been unsuccessful; the species was named Placodes fomentarius by Lucien Quélet in 1886, Ochroporus fomentarius by Joseph Schröter in 1888 and Scindalma fomentarium by Otto Kuntze in 1898. In the twentieth century, Narcisse Théophile Patouillard named the species Ungulina fomentaria in 1900, and William Murrill twice reallocated the species; in 1903, he named it Elfvingia fomentaria and in 1914, he named it Elfvingiella fomentaria. In 1963, Shu Chün Teng named it Pyropolyporus fomentarius. These names are considered obligate synonyms; that is, different names for the same species based on a single description or specimen. In addition to the obligate synonyms, there are a number of taxonomic synonyms, whereby names have been described as separate species, but have come to be considered synonymous. The species is commonly known as the tinder fungus, hoof fungus, tinder polypore, ice man fungus or false tinder fungus.

== Description ==
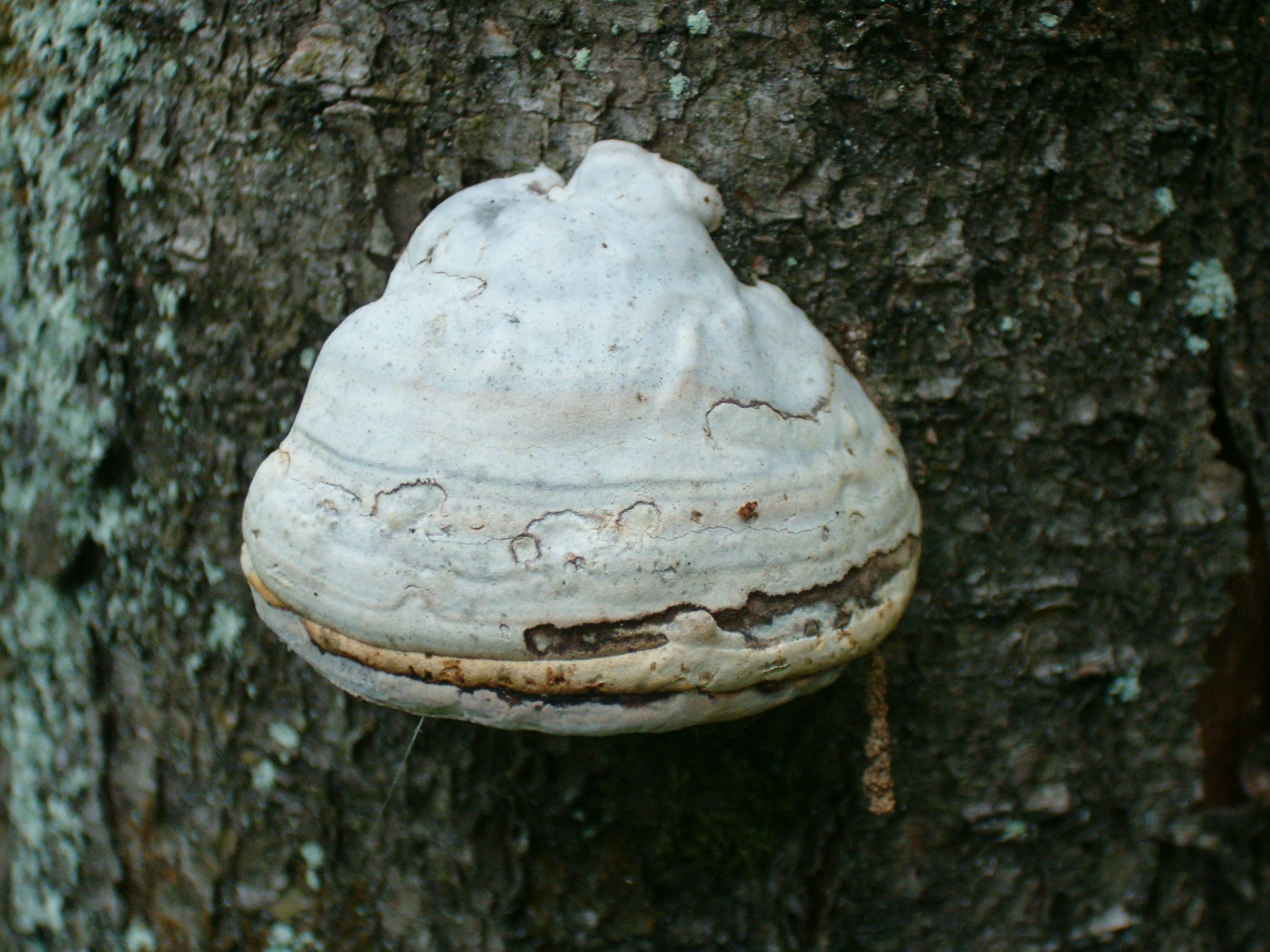
F. fomentarius can vary in colour from a very light grey to almost black.

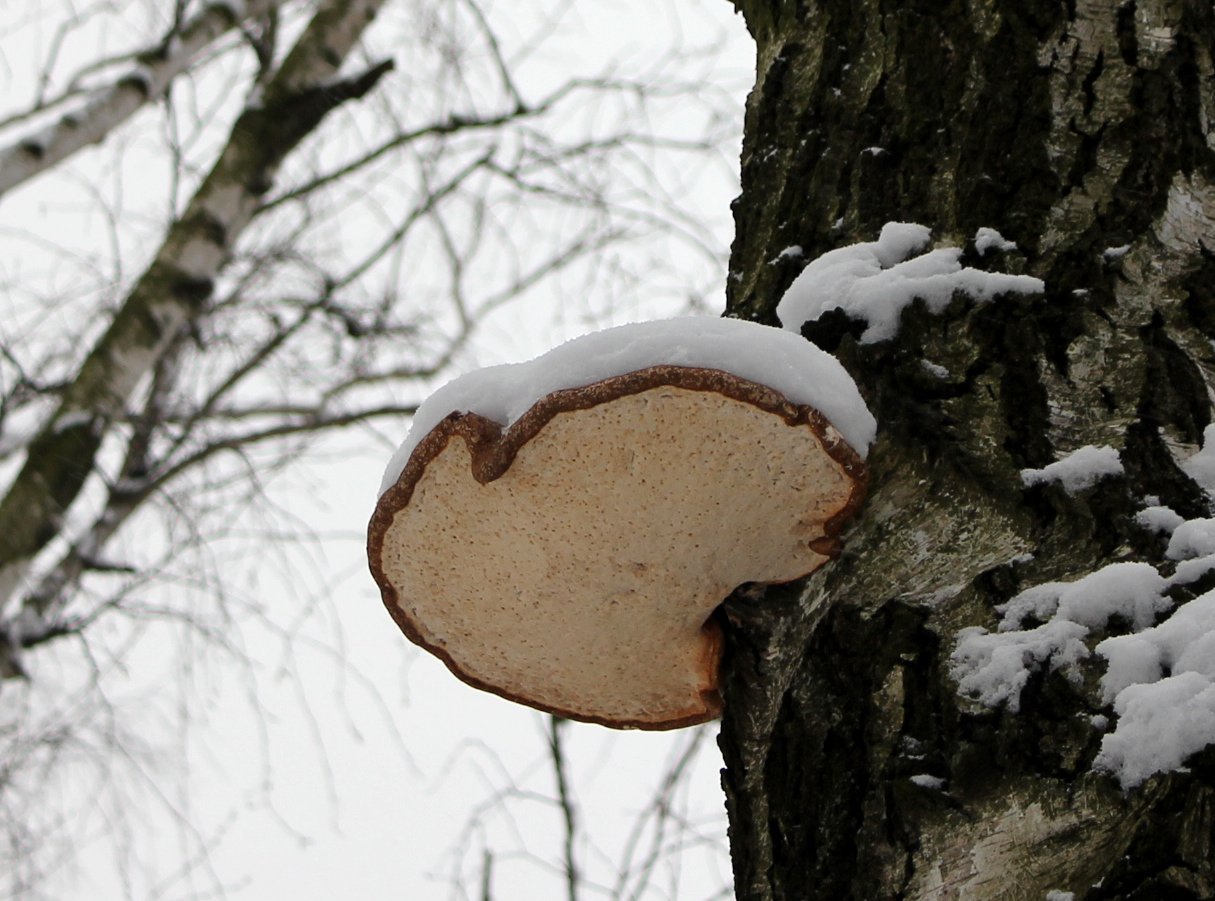
The porous underside and the brown rim.

Fomes fomentarius has a fruit body of between 5 and 45 centimetres (2.0 and 17.7 in) across, 3 and 25 cm (1.2 and 9.8 in) wide and 2 and 25 cm (0.8 and 9.8 in) thick, which attaches broadly to the tree on which the fungus is growing. While typically shaped like a horse's hoof, it can also be more bracket-like with an umbonate attachment to the substrate. The species typically has broad, concentric ridges, with a blunt and rounded margin.

The flesh is hard and fibrous, and a cinnamon brown colour. The upper surface is tough, bumpy, hard and woody, varying in colour, usually a light brown or grey. The margin is whitish during periods of growth. The hard crust is from 1 to 2 mm (0.04 to 0.08 in) thick, and covers the tough flesh. The underside has round pores of a cream colour when new, maturing to brown, though they darken when handled. The pores are circular, and there are 2–3 per millimetre. The tubes are 2 to 7 mm (0.08 to 0.28 in) long and a rusty brown colour.

The colouration and size of the fruit body can vary based on where the specimen has grown. Silvery-white, greyish and nearly black specimens have been known. The darkest fruit bodies were previously classified as Fomes nigricans, but this is now recognised as a synonym of Fomes fomentarius. The colour is typically lighter at lower latitudes and altitudes, as well as on fruit bodies in the Northern Hemisphere that grow on the south side of trees. However, studies have concluded that there is no reliable way to differentiate varieties; instead, the phenotypic differences can "be attributed either to different ecotypes or to interactions between the genotype and its environment".

=== Microscopic features ===
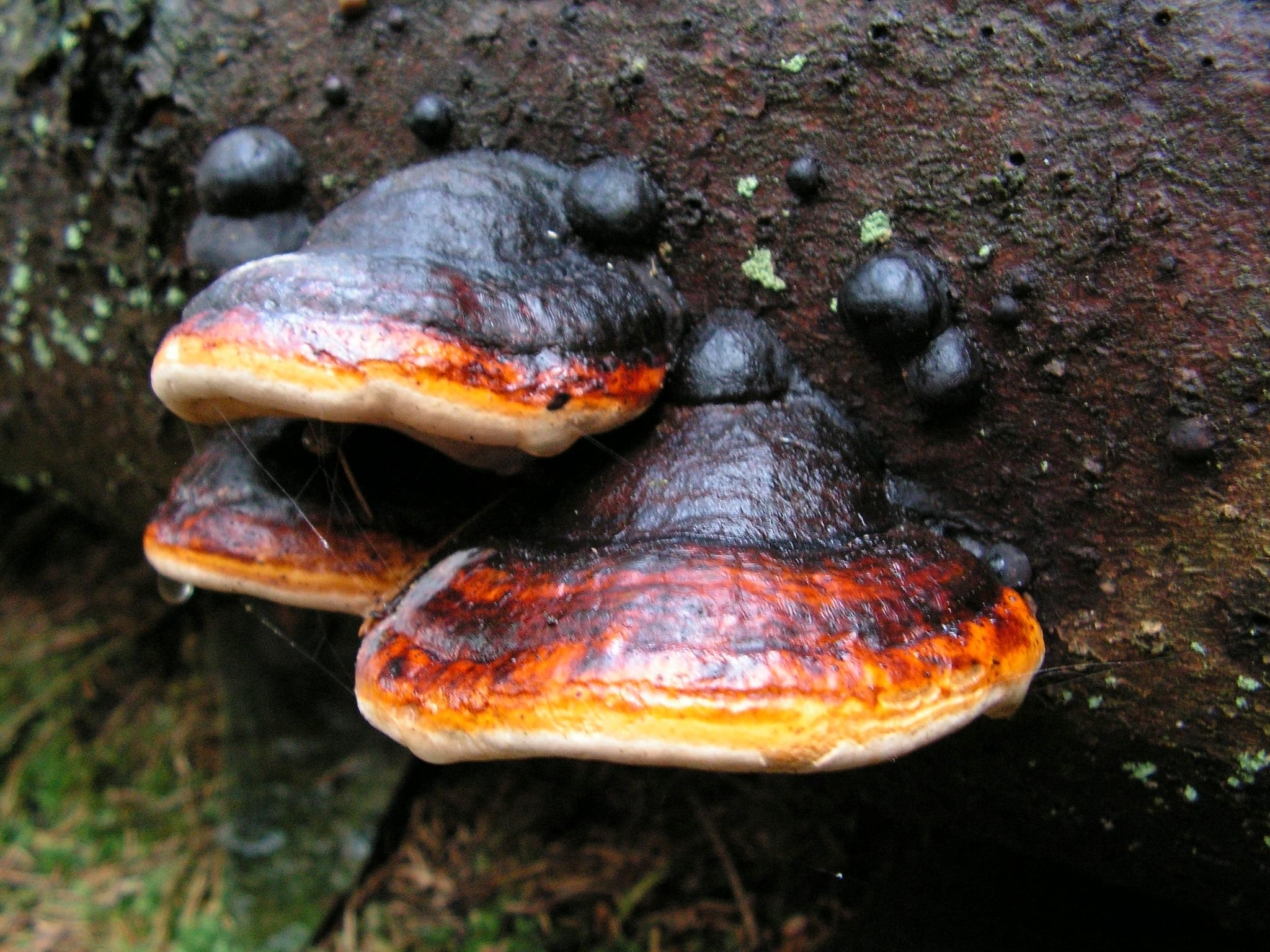
Fomitopsis pinicola is a lookalike species.

The spores are lemon-yellow in colour, and oblong-ellipsoid in shape. They measure 15–20 by 5–7 μm. The species has a trimitic hyphal structure (meaning that it has generative, skeletal and binding hyphae), with generative hyphae (hyphae that are relatively undifferentiated and can develop reproductive structures) with clamp connections.

=== Similar species ===
Fomes fomentarius can easily be confused with Phellinus igniarius, species from the genus Ganoderma and Fomitopsis pinicola. An easy way to differentiate F. fomentarius is by adding a drop of potassium hydroxide onto a small piece of the fruit body from the upper surface. The solution will turn a dark blood red if the specimen is F. fomentarius, due to the presence of the chemical fomentariol.

== Habitat and distribution ==
Fomes fomentarius has a circumboreal distribution as well as being found in both northern and southern Africa, throughout Asia and into eastern North America, and throughout Europe, and is frequently encountered. The optimal temperature for the species's growth is between 27 and 30 °C (81 and 86 °F) and the maximum is between 34 and 38 °C (93 and 100 °F). F. fomentarius typically grows alone, but multiple fruit bodies can sometimes be found upon the same host trunk. The species most typically grows upon hardwoods. In northern areas, it is most common on birch, while, in the south, beech is more typical. In the Mediterranean, oak is the typical host. The species has also been known to grow upon maple, cherry, hickory, lime tree, poplar, willow, alder, hornbeam, sycamore, and even, exceptionally, softwoods, such as conifers.

== Ecology ==
Fomes fomentarius is a stem-associated white-rot fungus that degrades both lignin and cellulose in hardwood tissues, resulting in pale, fibrous wood. Although long regarded primarily as a pathogen of living trees, its ecological strategy has been reassessed. The species has been described as apparently unable to colonise freshly wounded sapwood directly, instead requiring prior wood colonisation by other microorganisms. In experimental studies of European beech (Fagus sylvatica), the fungus was not recovered from freshly cut healthy wood, but was frequently isolated after incubation under drying conditions, suggesting the presence of latent mycelia within living stem tissues. In these studies, F. fomentarius was isolated predominantly from stem tissues rather than branches, corresponding to the typical position of basidiocarps on mature trees. Microscopic examination revealed fungal hyphae within xylem lumina following incubation, consistent with activation of previously quiescent thalli.

These findings have led some authors to interpret F. fomentarius as adopting an endophytic phase during part of its life cycle, remaining latent within living trees and becoming actively saprotrophic as host tissues senesce or environmental conditions change. As with many wood-decay fungi, the distinction between parasitic colonisation of living tissue and saprotrophic decay of senescent or stressed wood may be gradual rather than discrete.

The fruit bodies are perennial, surviving for up to thirty years. The strongest growth period is between early summer and autumn. The yearly growth always occurs on the bottom of the fungus, meaning that the lowest layer is the youngest. This occurs even if the host tree has been laid on the forest floor, which can happen because of the white rot induced by the fungus. This is a process known as positive gravitropism. Very large numbers of spores are produced, particularly in spring, with up to 887 million basidiospores an hour being produced by some fruit bodies. Spore production also takes place in autumn, though not nearly as heavily. The spores are released at comparatively low temperatures. In dry weather, the spores are visible as a white powder.

== Uses ==
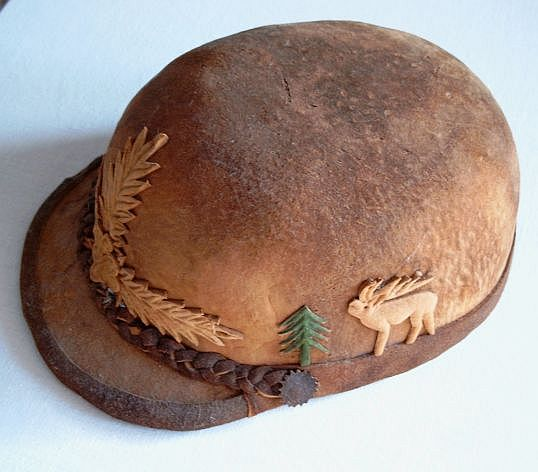
A cap made from amadou

The species is inedible; the flesh has an acrid taste, with a slightly fruity smell. The fungus has economic significance; it depreciates timber value as the parasitic infection advances. Fomes fomentarius infects trees through damaged bark.

=== Amadou ===
This species, as well as others such as Phellinus igniarius, can be used to make amadou, a material used as tinder, among other purposes. Amadou is produced from the flesh of the fungus fruit bodies. The young fruit bodies are soaked in water before being cut into strips, and are then beaten and stretched, separating the fibres. The resulting material is referred to as "red amadou". The addition of gunpowder or nitre produces an even more potent tinder. The flesh has further been used to produce clothing, including caps, gloves and breeches.

Amadou is used in fly fishing for drying flies. Other items of clothing and even picture frames and ornaments may be made from the fungus, particularly Bohemia. The fungus is known to have been used as a firestarter in Hedeby, and it is known that the fungus was used as early as 3000 BCE. When found, the 5,000-year-old Ötzi the Iceman was carrying four pieces of F. fomentarius fruit body. Chemical tests led to the conclusion that he carried it for use as tinder.

== See also ==
- Piptoporus betulinus also carried by Ötzi
- Forest pathology
- Ganoderma applanatum known as the artist's conk

== Cited texts ==
- Harding, Patrick (2008). Mushroom Miscellany. HarperCollins. ISBN 978-0-00-728464-1.
- Schmidt, Olaf (2006). Wood and Tree Fungi: Biology, Damage, Protection, and Use. Springer. ISBN 978-3-540-32138-5.
- Schwarze, Francis W. M. R.; Engels, Julia; Mattheck, Claus (2000). Fungal Strategies of Wood Decay in Trees. Springer. ISBN 978-3-540-67205-0.
- Stamets, Paul (2005). Mycelium Running. Ten Speed Press. ISBN 978-1-58008-579-3.
