= Bamboo gun =

Traditional Philippine toy gun

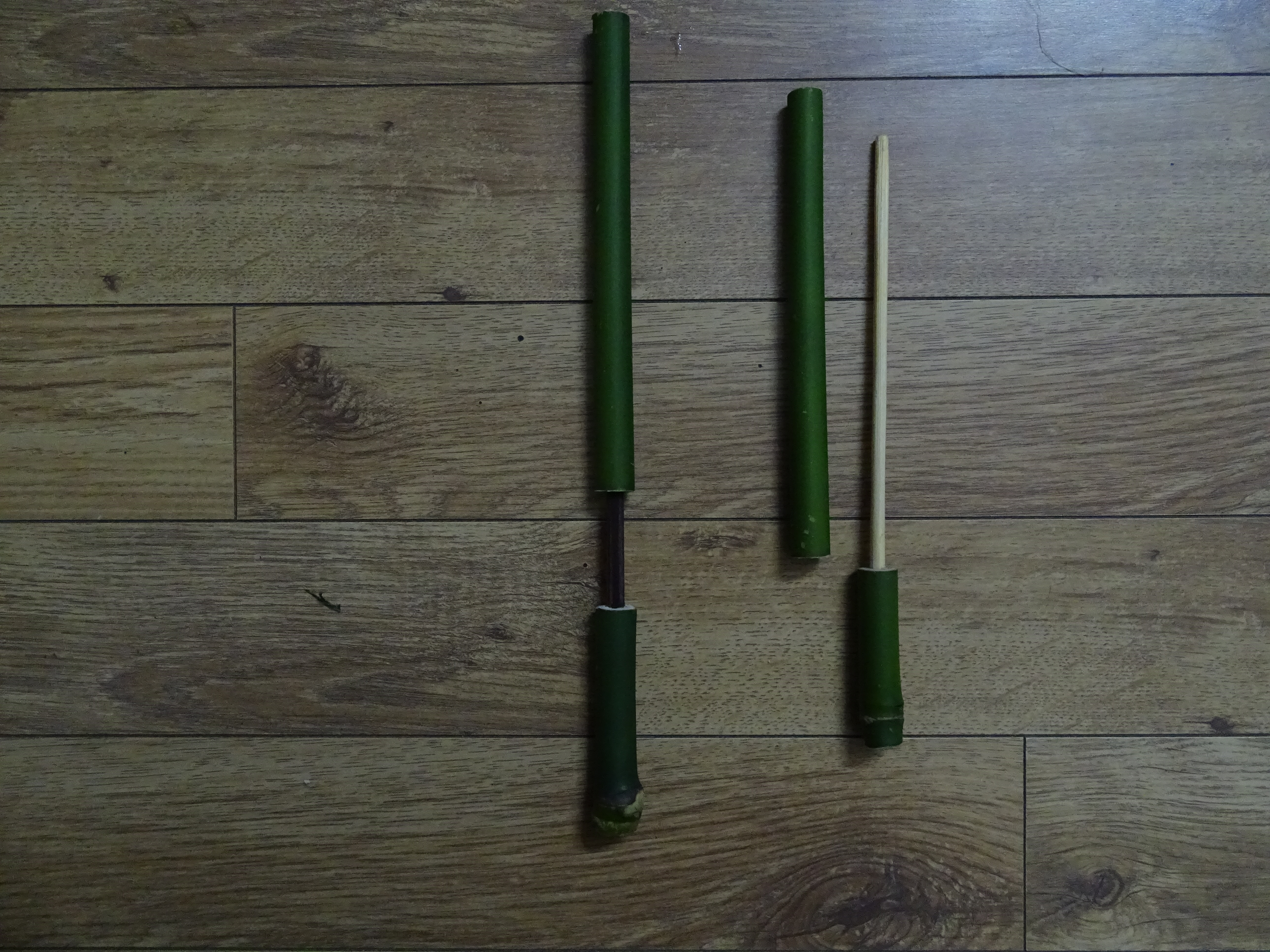
Bamboo tube gun

A bamboo gun is a traditional toy gun, a pop gun made from a hollow cylindrical piece of bamboo and a piston that works as a syringe plunger. A tough small "bullet" like a dry seed or a wet piece of paper is inserted in one end of the cylinder and the piston is pushed in rapidly at the other end. This results in the air compressing inside before it pushes the "bullet" out with a pop.

Today, the material of the gun barrel is modified from bamboo to alloy.

== Indonesia ==
In Indonesia, the bamboo gun is known by various names, especially those originating from West Java, Banten, and Jakarta, where in Sundanese it is known as bebeletokan, while in Betawi it is known as pletokan or peletokan. In other regions it is also found, in South Sumatra it is known as dor-doran, the Madurese people call it tor-cetoran, while in Central Java it is known as tulup or bedhil-bedhilan.

== Philippines ==
The bamboo gun is popular among children in rural areas of the Philippines. Regional names include sumpak, sulpak, sulpot, palsuot, paltok and luthang.

The name luthang is originally Cebuano, meaning a small naval cannon (lantaka). The word has been recorded in Spanish dictionaries of Visayan languages since at least 1711, where its meaning evolved to include muskets, arquebuses and shotguns. The word is still used as a verb meaning "to gun down" in Cebuano languages; and in Hiligaynon as an archaic synonym of pistola (gun or pistol).

== Vietnam ==
The bamboo gun was a wildly popular toy in Vietnam in the 90s-2000s and had many names, such as súng phóc, ống phóc, ống thụt, etc.

== See also ==
- Sumpit
- Lantaka
- Fire piston
- Sipa
- Pop gun
