= Ferrocerium =

Pyrophoric alloy whose primary components are cerium and iron

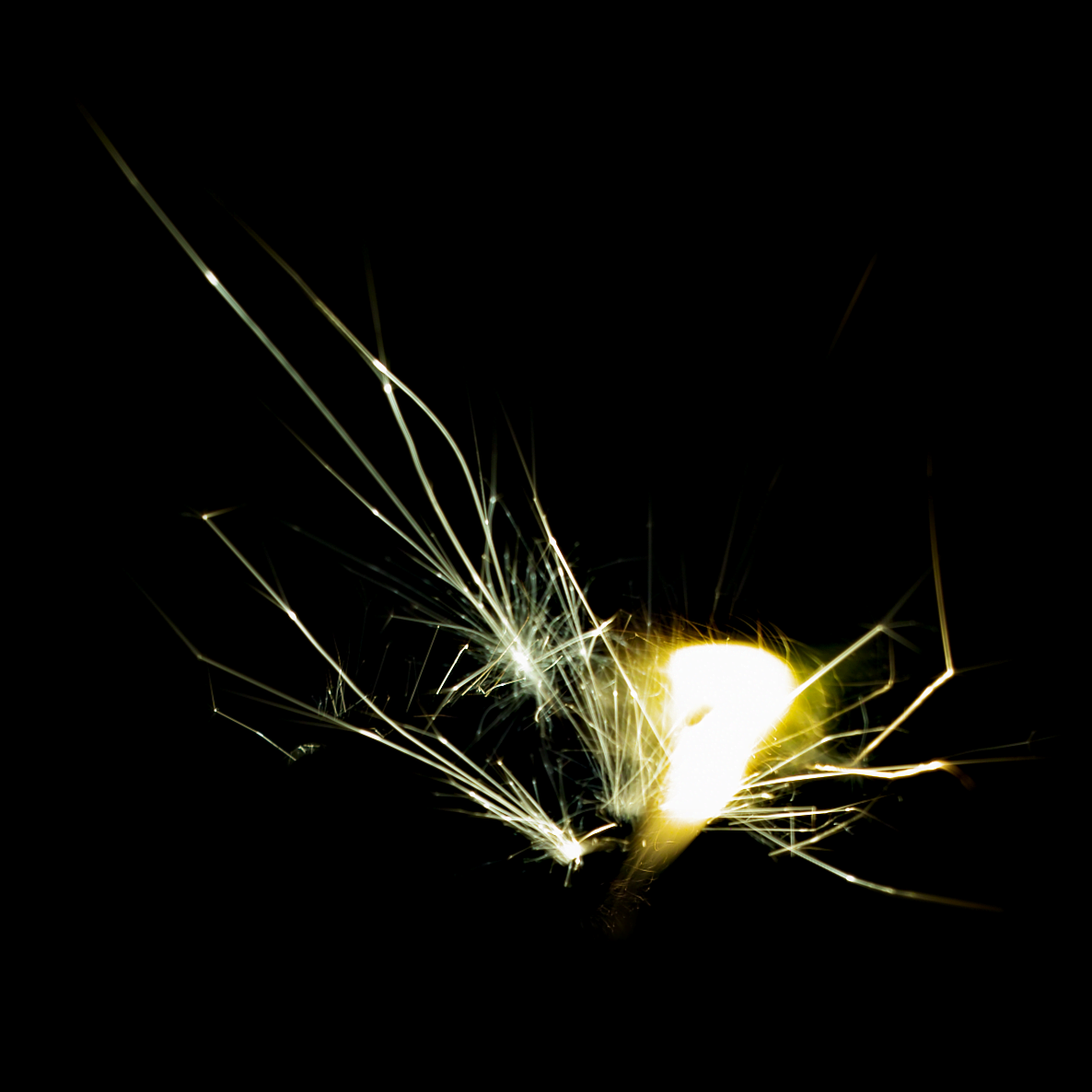
Spark trails from a cigarette lighter

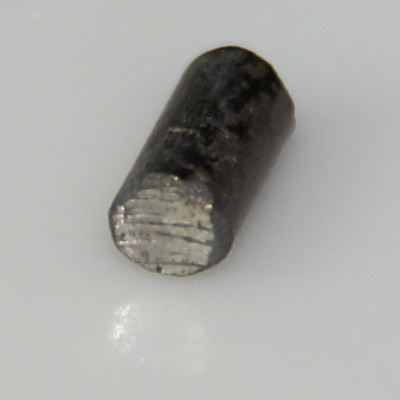
Ferrocerium "flint" from a lighter

Ferrocerium (also known in Europe as Auermetall) is a synthetic pyrophoric alloy of mischmetal (cerium, lanthanum, neodymium, other trace lanthanides and some iron – about 95% lanthanides and 5% iron) hardened by blending in oxides of iron and/or magnesium. When struck with a harder material, friction produces hot fragments that oxidize rapidly when exposed to the oxygen in the air, producing sparks that can reach temperatures of 3,315 °C (6,000 °F). The effect is due to the low ignition temperature of cerium, between 150 and 180 °C (302 and 356 °F).

Ferrocerium has many commercial applications, such as the ignition source for cigarette or cigar lighters, strikers for gas welding and cutting torches, deoxidization in metallurgy, and ferrocerium rods. Because of ferrocerium's ability to ignite in adverse conditions, rods of ferrocerium (also called ferro rods, spark rods, and flint-spark-lighters) are commonly used in camping and as emergency firelighting devices in survival kits— in which compositions with higher magnesium contents are preferred due to producing hotter, whiter sparks. Though ferrocerium is sometimes mistakenly referred to as "flint", due to their similar use in fire-lighting, ferrocerium and natural flint have opposite mechanical operation.

== Discovery ==
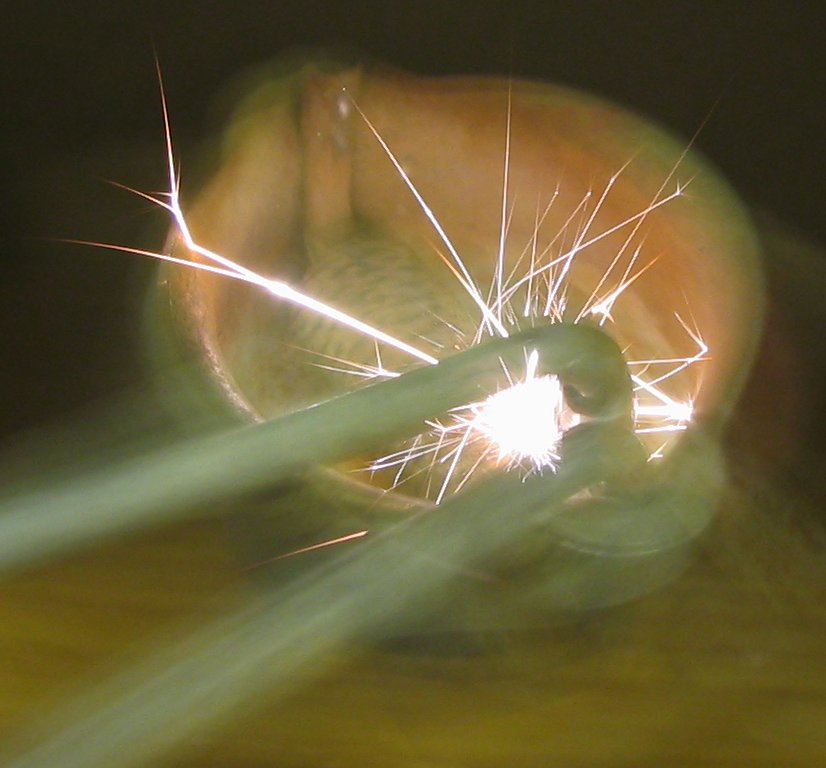
A spark lighter in action

Ferrocerium alloy was invented in 1903 by the Austrian chemist Carl Auer von Welsbach. It takes its name from its two primary components: iron (from Latin: ferrum), and the rare-earth element cerium, which is the most prevalent of the lanthanides in the mixture. Except for the extra iron and magnesium oxides added to harden it, the mixture is approximately the combination found naturally in tailings from thorium mining, which Auer von Welsbach was investigating. The pyrophoric effect is dependent on the brittleness of the alloy and its low autoignition temperature.

== Composition ==
In Auer von Welsbach's first alloy, 30% iron (ferrum) was added to purified cerium, hence the name "ferro-cerium". Two subsequent Auermetalls were developed: the second also included lanthanum to produce brighter sparks, and the third added other heavy metals.

A modern ferrocerium firesteel product is composed of an alloy of rare-earth metals called mischmetal, containing approximately 20.8% iron, 41.8% cerium, about 4.4% each of praseodymium, neodymium, and magnesium, plus 24.2% lanthanum. A variety of other components are added to modify the spark and processing characteristics. Most contemporary ferrocerium rods are hardened with iron oxide and magnesium oxide.

== Uses ==
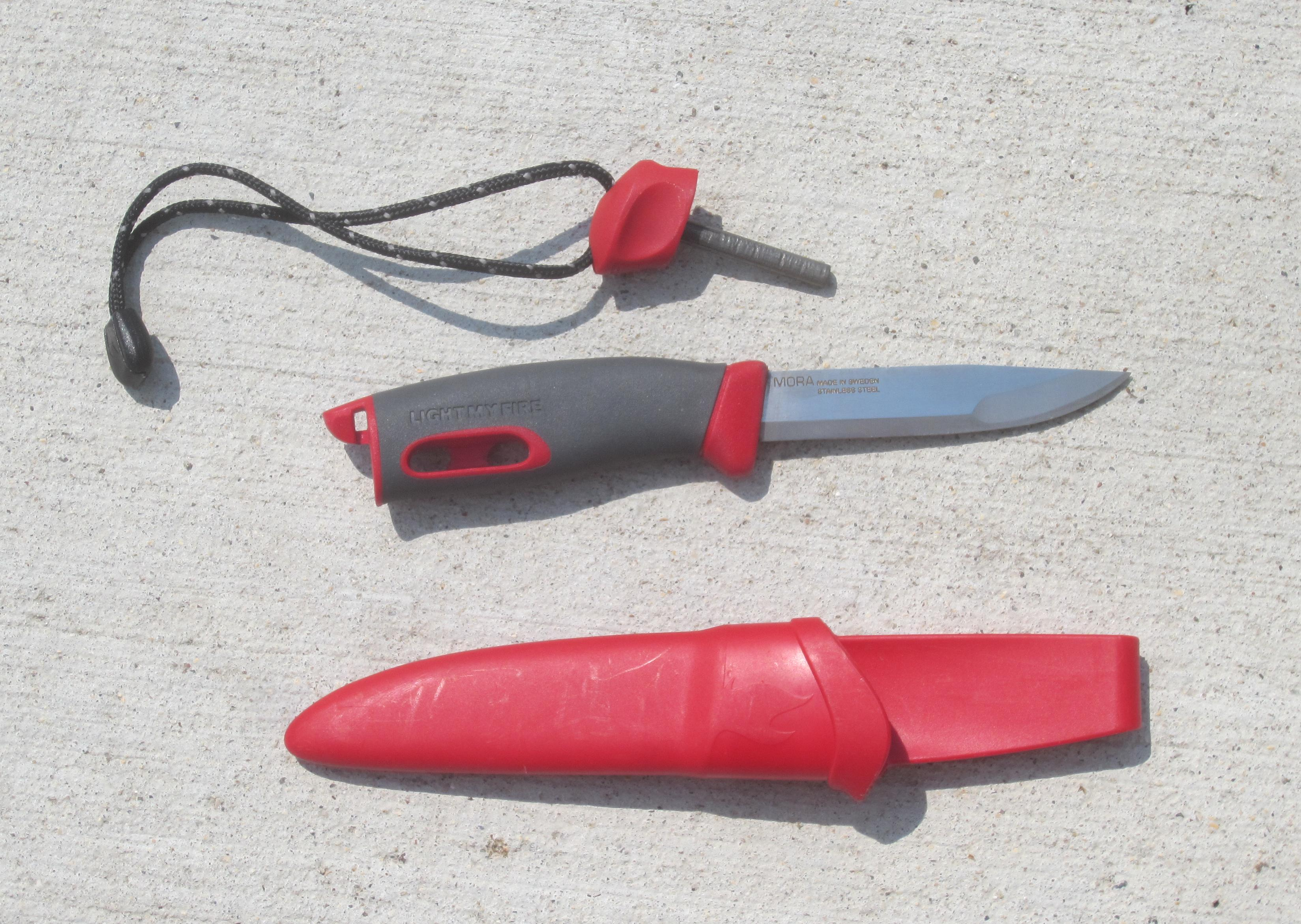
A mora knife with a ferrocerium rod that can be stored in the handle

Ferrocerium is used in fire lighting in conjunction with a striker, similarly to natural flint-and-steel, though ferrocerium takes on the opposite role to the traditional system; instead of a natural flint rock striking tiny iron particles from a firesteel, a striker (which may be in the form of a hardened steel wheel) strikes particles of ferrocerium off of the "flint". This manual rubbing action creates a spark due to cerium's low ignition temperature between 150–180 °C (302–356 °F). Any material that is harder than the rod itself may be used to produce sparks. Though the striker must have a sharp corner, sharp edge, or a knurled surface in order to produce sparks, carbon steel is not required. The idea that carbon steel is needed to produce sparks from a ferrocerium rod is an oft repeated myth, though carbon steel does make the spark more prevalent when striking.

Ferrocerium is most commonly used to start Bunsen burners and oxyacetylene welding torches.

About 700 tons were produced in 2000.
