= Char cloth =

Type of tinder made from natural fibres via pyrolysis

Char Cloth
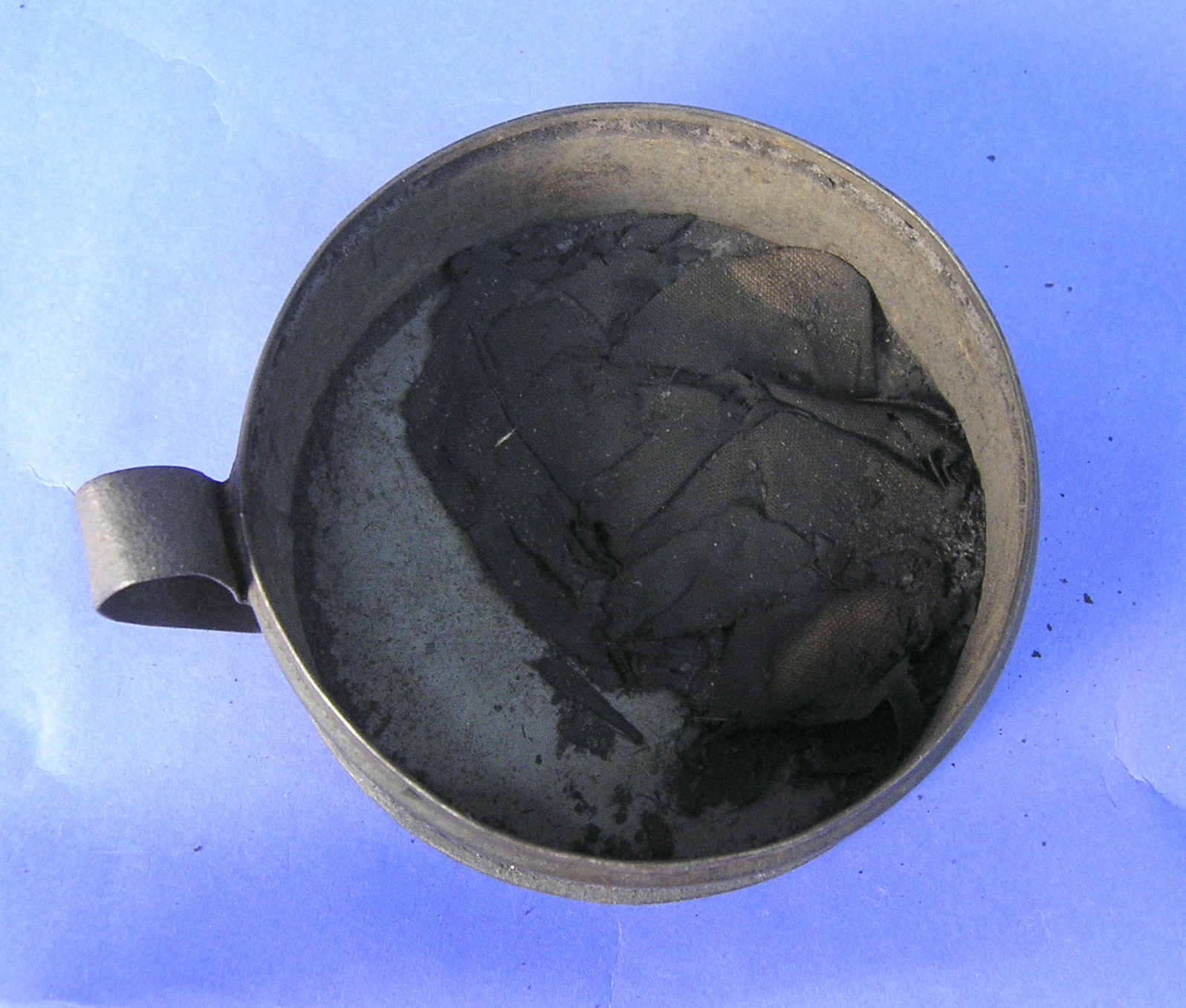
- Char cloth in a tinder box

Thermal properties
- Upper working temperature: 455 °C
- Lower working temperature: 349 °C

Char cloth, also called char paper, is a material with low ignition temperature, used as tinder when lighting a fire. It is the main component in a tinderbox. It is a small swatch of fabric made from a natural fibre (such as linen, cotton, jute etc.) that has been converted through pyrolysis.

== Description ==
Char cloth looks like a black, fragile piece of cloth. It is usually made from swatches of organic fabrics, but similar tinder can be made in the same way using cotton balls or tampons, dried moss, leaves or fungus (amadou for instance), raw unspun flax, etc. This is packed into a small, almost airtight, rectangular tin, then heated slowly and steadily over coals for a long period of time, allowing it to undergo pyrolysis. The material that remains after this process ignites very easily, making it the preferred tinder when lighting a fire using flint and steel.

Pyrolysis is defined as "a thermochemical decomposition of organic material at elevated temperatures in the absence of oxygen". Essentially, pyrolysis is turning organic matter into charcoal, a low weight, high energy content, very easily ignited matter. Fresh charcoal can even autoignite, even though its autoignition temperature (349 – 455 °C) is not that low (for instance, paper's is 218–246 °C (424–475 °F)); this is because, if even a small point ignites, it will generate more energy than lost, igniting the cloth around, so energy and temperature will build up until it turns red hot ember. The cloth usually does not produce enough gas for it to produce flames, but if close enough to something that can, a full fire will finally occur.

== Technique ==
This material, when properly prepared, will ignite with the slightest spark and provides a slow burning, hot ember to build the fire around, making it very popular with campers; especially in harsh weather conditions when lighting a fire is more difficult. Applying the same principle that has been used throughout history by indigenous peoples, char cloth can start a fire with only the help of flint and steel, it is then placed in a tinder bundle and blown into flames. It is easily made on a small scale, making it accessible and popular in the domestic sphere and while cooking on campfires.

When struck against steel, a flint edge produces sparks. 'The hard flint edge shaves off a particle of the steel that exposes iron, which reacts with oxygen from the atmosphere and can ignite the proper tinder'. With this flint and steel technique the char cloth will ignite and an "ember will flash through it" allowing for a flame to be built around the ember. Although the char cloth is slow burning, the spark will need to be fostered using small kindling materials such as dried leaves, small twigs or a tinder bundle.

== Historical uses ==
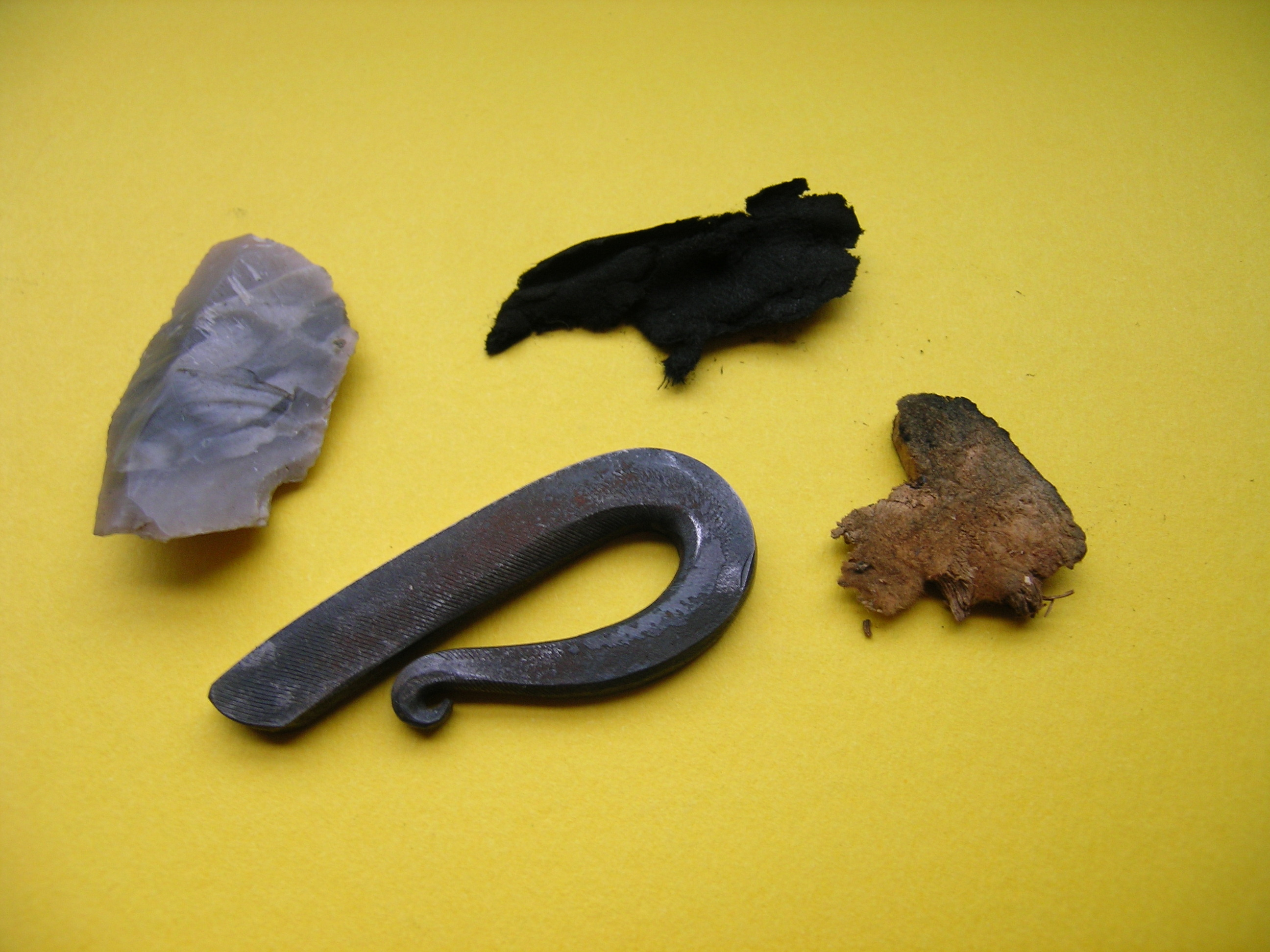
Components of a tinderbox, including char cloth

Char cloths have been used to light fires for centuries.

One of the earliest recorded uses of a char cloth dates back to a ninjutsu manual written by Hattori Hanzō in 1560 called the Ninpiden or Shinobi Hiden, or Legends of Ninja Secrets. The manual states how to make char cloth from either cotton, silk or paper.

"Crumple cotton, silk, or paper until it is soft. Divide it into small amounts, and dry-roast it until it is black, paying attention that it doesn't burn white. Keep it within a tightly covered container and be sure to always have some at hand."

Another use of char cloth was recorded by C. P. Mountford and R. M. Berndt in Making Fire by Percussion, where the introduction of char cloth to Australian Indigenous Aboriginals is detailed, saying the use of char cloth was easier than traditional methods.

Char cloth has also been noted as used by the indigenous people of Hawaii in 1940. In the Hawaiian Journal of History, when describing the smoking habits of the islanders, the use of char cloth to light tobacco is briefly mentioned as a method introduced by colonists to the Hawaiian people. "This was not a traditional Hawaiian way of starting fires but was the flint and steel method introduced from the West."

== Scientific Investigation ==
The production of char cloth occurs when organic cellulose based fibres undergo pyrolysis, an irreversible chemical reaction that includes the thermal decomposition of material in an inert atmosphere (in the absence of oxygen). At elevated temperatures of greater than 250 °C, cellulose decomposes to form considerable amounts of flammable products. "Biomass is a complex material, mainly composed of hemicellulose, cellulose, and lignin in addition to extractives (tannins, fatty acids, resins) and inorganic salts". Char cloth is converted biomass, named biochar. Char cloth is the result of incomplete combustion, as oxygen is a limiting reagent in the reaction due to the limited oxygen let into the tin during the production process.
