= Amadou =

Spongy material derived from fungi

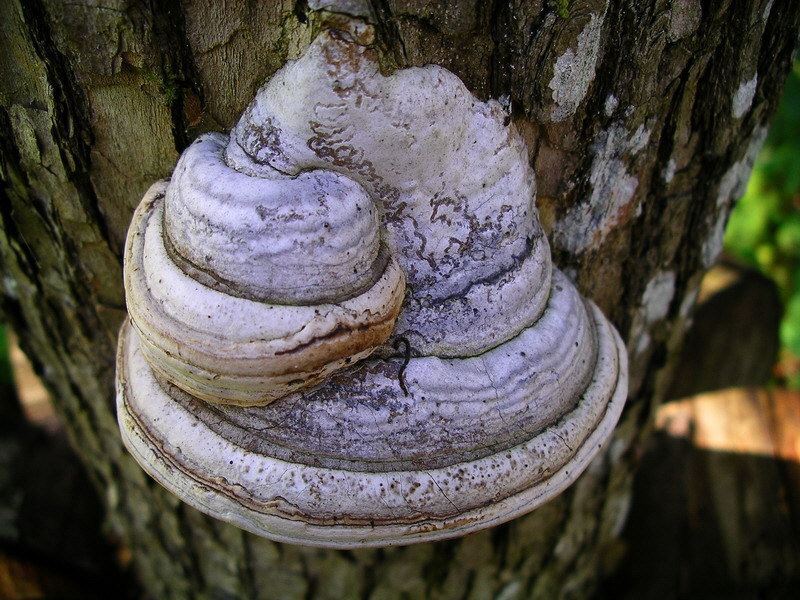
Fomes fomentarius

Amadou is a spongy material derived from Fomes fomentarius and similar fungi that grow on the bark of coniferous and angiosperm trees, and have the appearance of a horse's hoof (thus the name "hoof fungus"). It is also known as the "tinder fungus" and is useful for starting slow-burning fires. The fungus must be removed from the tree, the hard outer layer scraped off, and then thin strips of the inner spongy layer cut for use as tinder.

Amadou was a precious resource to ancient people, allowing them to start a fire by catching sparks from flint struck against iron pyrite. Bits of fungus preserved in peat have been discovered at the Mesolithic site of Star Carr in the UK, modified presumably for this purpose. Remarkable evidence for its utility is provided by the discovery of the 5,000-year-old remains of Ötzi, who carried it on a cross-alpine excursion before his death and subsequent ice-entombment.

Amadou has great water-absorbing abilities. It is used in fly fishing for drying out dry flies that have become wet. Another use is for forming a felt-like fabric used in the making of hats and other items. It can be used as a kind of artificial leather. Mycologist Paul Stamets famously wears a hat made of amadou.

Before such uses, amadou needs to be prepared by being pounded flat, and boiled or soaked in a solution of nitre. One method of preparation starts by soaking a slice in washing soda for a week, beating it gently from time to time. Following this it is left to dry. The result is initially hard and must be pounded with a blunt object to soften and flatten it. The specialist trade of making traditional amadou products is under threat and increasingly rare in some parts of Europe.
