= Campfire songs =

Songs traditionally sung around a campfire

Camp songs or campfire songs are a category of folk music traditionally sung around a campfire for entertainment. Since the advent of summer camp as an activity for children, these songs have been identified with children's songs, although they may have originated in earlier traditions popular with adults. The tradition of singing around a campfire has existed for centuries. It has been suggested that a good campfire song will have a strong refrain or repeating structure so that others can participate easily. Campfire songs may be used alongside campfire stories.

At summer camps for children, songs have been said to build a sense of belonging among campers. 4-H reports that camp songs foster camaraderie and reduce the stress and anxiety of a new environment.

== See also ==
- List of folk songs by Roud number
