= The Countryside Code =

Sets of rules for walkers in the United Kingdom

The Countryside Code is a set of guidelines designed for use by both the public and land managers across England and Wales. It offers members of the public a "guide to enjoying parks and waterways, coast and countryside", whilst also providing advice on how land managers can help visitors. It was established in 2004 as a relaunch of The Country Code, which had existed since the 1930s.

The Countryside Code is managed by Natural England in England and Natural Resources Wales in Wales. Whilst both organisations oversee the Countryside Code, they are each individually responsible for promoting it in their respective country.

== The original rules ==
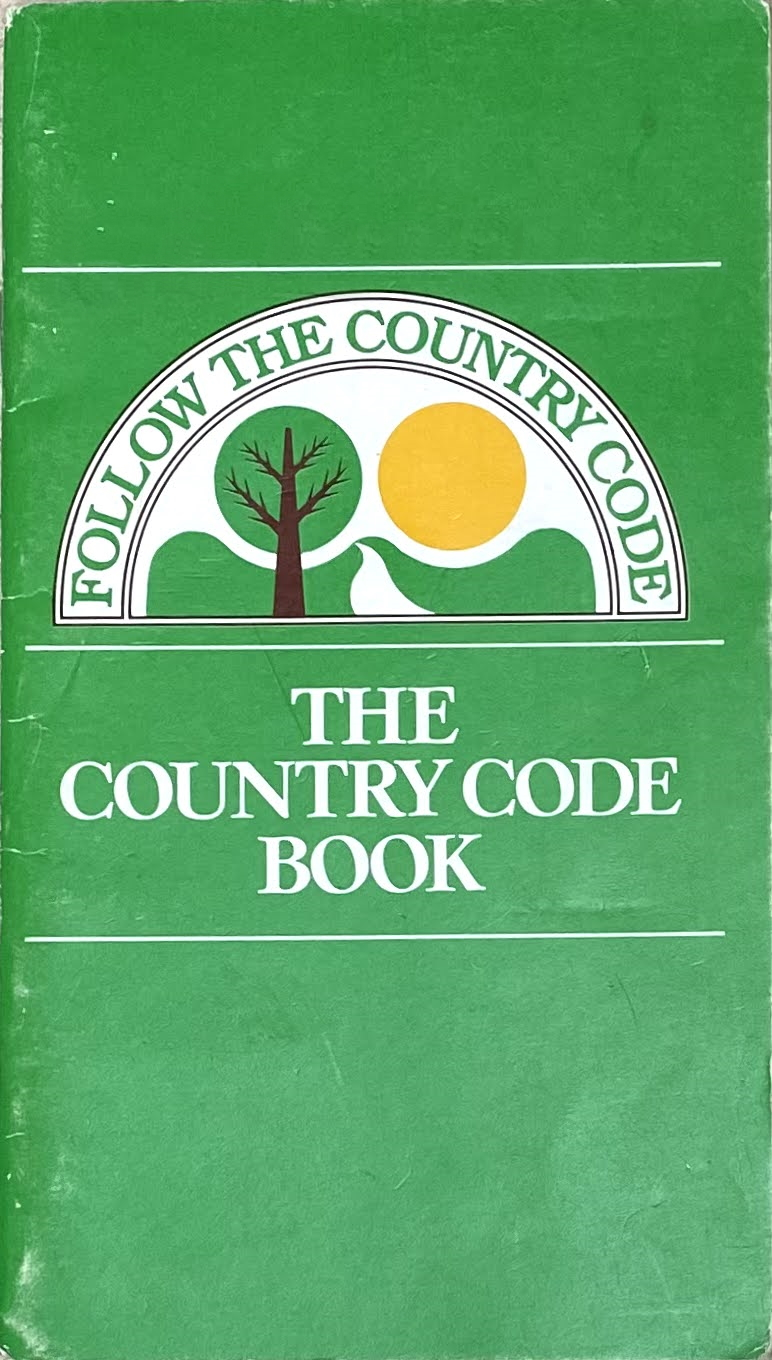
The Country Code Book 1982

The Country Code evolved from the work of various organisations and had several different versions from the 1930s. A booklet version was published in 1951, and the most widely accepted version of The Country Code was published in 1981 by the Countryside Commission:

1. Enjoy the countryside and respect its life and work
2. Guard against all risk of fire
3. Fasten all gates
4. Keep your dogs under close control
5. Keep to public paths across farmland
6. Use gates and stiles to cross fences, hedges and walls
7. Leave livestock, crops and machinery alone
8. Take your litter home
9. Help to keep all water clean
10. Protect wildlife, plants and trees
11. Take special care on country roads
12. Make no unnecessary noise

At some point after 1981, the instruction to fasten all gates was replaced with one to instead leave gates as found.

== The Countryside Code ==
In 2004, the Country Code was revised and relaunched as The Countryside Code (Côd Cefn Gwlad in Welsh) to reflect the introduction of new open access rights and changes in society over the preceding years. The revised Code was produced through a partnership between the Countryside Agency and the Countryside Council for Wales

- Be safe - plan ahead and follow any signs
- Leave gates and property as you find them
- Protect plants and animals, and take your litter home
- Keep dogs under close control
- Consider other people

== The Countryside Code Refresh ==
A new, refreshed Countryside Code was launched by Natural England and Natural Resources Wales, coinciding with the 70th anniversary of the creation of the founding booklet. Key changes to the code included:

- New advice for people to ‘be nice, say hello, share the space’ as well as ‘enjoy your visit, have fun, make a memory’.
- A reminder not to feed livestock, horses or wild animals.
- To stay on marked footpaths, even if they are muddy, to protect crops and wildlife.
- Information on permissions to do certain outdoor activities, such as wild swimming.
- Clearer rules for dog walkers to take home dog poo and use their own bin if a there are no public waste bins.
- A refreshed tone of voice, creating a guide for the public rather than a list of rules – recognising the significant health and wellbeing benefits of spending time in nature.
- New wording to make clear that the code applies to all our natural places, including parks and waterways, coast and countryside.

== Publicity and promotion ==
In the 1960s and 70s the Country Code was publicised by several public information films shown in cinemas and on television.

In May 2023, Natural England and Aardman Animations launched a new campaign promoting the Countryside Code, alongside Shaun the Sheep. The aim of the campaign was to engage young people and children with the messages of the Countryside Code.

== The Scottish Outdoor Access Code ==
In Scotland, where there is a more general right of access, Scottish Natural Heritage developed The Scottish Outdoor Access Code, which was approved in draft form by the Scottish Parliament in July 2003 following the passing of the Land Reform (Scotland) Act of the same year, and was accepted in February 2005. The Scottish Outdoor Access Code differs significantly from The Country Code in that it promotes access rights that include crossing over land and non-motorised recreational activities like walking, cycling, angling and horse riding, and will normally apply in all rural settings. The basis of access rights over land (in Scotland) is of shared responsibilities, in that those exercising such rights have to act responsibly, following the Scottish Outdoor Access Code, while land owners/managers have a reciprocal responsibility in respecting the interests of those who exercise their rights.

The Scottish code "is based on three key principles [which] apply equally to the public and to land managers":

1. Take personal responsibility for your own actions.
2. Respect people's privacy and peace of mind.
3. Help land managers and others to work safely and effectively.

Three additional principles apply to visitors:

1. Care for your environment.
2. Keep your dog under proper control.
3. Take extra care if you are organising an event or running a business.

Both the Countryside Code and the Scottish code provide guidance for land managers as well as visitors.

== See also ==
- Leave No Trace
- Tread Lightly!
- Trail ethics
