= Wilderness Volunteers =

Nonprofit organization

- Abbreviation: WV
- Formation: 1997; 29 years ago
- Founder: Deborah Northcutt; John Sherman; Vince White-Petteruti
- Type: Nonprofit
- Tax ID no.: 91-1821692
- Legal status: 501(c)(3)
- Purpose: Stewardship of America's wild lands through organizing and promoting volunteer service in cooperation with public land agencies.
- Headquarters: Flagstaff, Arizona
- Region served: United States
- Board President: Ross Holloway
- Executive Director: Carrie Henderson
- Staff: 2
- Volunteers: Approximately 500 per year
- Website: https://wildernessvolunteers.org/

Wilderness Volunteers (WV) is a 501(c)(3) nonprofit organization created in 1997 to organize and promote volunteer service to America's wild lands. WV works with public land agencies including the National Park Service, the Forest Service, the Bureau of Land Management and the United States Fish and Wildlife Service. They offer adventure service trips with a variety of projects including trail construction and maintenance, campsite restoration, revegetation, invasive plant removal, and cleanup. All trips are led by volunteer leaders. Trips are one week long and are limited to 12 or fewer participants. Wilderness Volunteers teaches and follows Leave No Trace outdoor living skills and ethics.

== Mission statement ==
Stewardship of America's wild lands through organizing and promoting volunteer service in cooperation with public land agencies.

== Organization ==
Wilderness Volunteers is governed by a volunteer Board of Directors, each serving a three-year term. A president is elected annually by the Board from among its members and is not paid. The executive director runs the day-to-day operations of the group, and is a paid staff member. In addition to the executive director, there is a full-time Program Manager. There are approximately 120 volunteer staff who lead the projects in the field, giving generously of their time and resources to support the program.

== Awards ==
Wilderness Volunteers received a Presidential Volunteer Service Award for making a difference through volunteer service in 2013.

In 2017 Wilderness Volunteers was awarded the National Park Service Wes Henry National Wilderness Stewardship non-government partner award.
