= Motorcycle Superstore =

American motorcycle equipment retailer

- Type: Private
- Founded: Grants Pass, Oregon, United States (1998)
- Founder: Don Becklin
- Headquarters: Irving, Texas, United States
- Key people: Zach Parham, President and CEO
- Products: riding gear, apparel, parts and accessories for motorcycles, scooters, ATVs, and snowmobiles
- Parent: MAG Retail Group
- Website: jpcycles.com/motorcyclesuperstore

Motorcycle Superstore is an Internet-based retailer of motorcycle riding gear, apparel, parts, and accessories with two retail outlets. Motorcycle Superstore also sells products for scooters, ATVs, snowmobiles, and personal watercraft.

== Overview ==
Motorcycle Superstore is a privately held organization based in Medford, Oregon. Club motorcycle racer, Don Becklin, started selling motorcycle gear from the attic of his grandfather's house in Grants Pass, Oregon in 1998. By 2000, Becklin's motorcycle-related Internet retail enterprise moved out of the attic into a corporate office, a warehouse, and a retail outlet in Medford, Oregon under the Motorcycle Superstore name. The company opened an additional distribution center in Louisville, Kentucky in 2010, with an attached retail outlet that opened in 2011. In May 2014, the controlling interest of Irvine, California-based Motorsport Aftermarket Group was acquired by Indianapolis-based holding company LDI Ltd. to merge Motorsport Aftermarket Group (or MAG) with a Fort Worth-based motorsport distribution company called Tucker Rocky. In 2015, The parent company for Motorcycle Superstore (MAG Retail Group) merged workforce and the corporate offices from Medford, Oregon and Anamosa, Iowa to a new temporary facility in Irving, Texas where a permanent facility was completed in October 2017.

=== Products ===
Motorcycle Superstore's product selection includes motorcycle-related helmets and riding gear, parts, tires, accessories and casual apparel for all riding styles including street/sportbike, cruiser, dirt bike, scooter, and ATV as well as gear and accessories for snowmobiles and personal watercraft.

In 2009, Motorcycle Superstore established a cooperative program with many U.S. motorcycle tire installation shops, called the "Preferred Installer Program," through which customers can purchase tires, exhaust systems or Power Commanders from Motorcycle Superstore and have them shipped to a local motorcycle shop for installation.

=== Facilities ===
The company's corporate headquarters is currently in Coppell, Texas. An Eastern distribution center is located in Louisville, Kentucky.

== Rankings, ratings, and awards ==
- Ranked #197 for online sales among all Internet retailers by Internet Retailer as of February 2010, with $71 million and 18.3% growth in 2010
- Ranked #7 in online sales among sporting goods websites by Internet Retailer in 2010
- Awarded "Growth Stage Company of the Year" in 2009 by the Oregon Entrepreneurs Network (OEN)
- Received 2011 BizRate Circle of Excellence award

== Sponsorships ==
Motorcycle Superstore's sponsorships as of 2011:

- American Motorcycle Association (AMA) Pro Women's Motocross Championship (title sponsor)
- AMA Pro Road Racing – SuperSport class (title sponsor)
- AMA Pro Grand National Championship Flat Track series
- AMA Pro Flat Track Pro Singles Championship (title sponsor)
- AMA Amateur National Motocross Championships at Loretta Lynn's (holeshot sponsor)
- AMA EnduroCross (associate sponsor)
- BlueRibbon Coalition – champions the responsible use of public lands and waters
- Tread Lightly – promotes responsible outdoor recreation
- St. Jude's Children's Research Hospital – pediatric cancer research center
- RiderDown Foundation – assists responsible off-road motorcyclists and ATV racers injured while riding
- MX for Children – promotes a positive bond between motocross enthusiasts and children's hospitals
- Children's Miracle Network Hospitals – raises funds for children's hospitals, medical research and community awareness of children's health issues

Motorcycle Superstore and Albertson Enterprises announced the launch of their Supercross and Motocross race team, Motorcycle Superstore / Suzuki at the end of 2015. The team will contest the full 17 race Monster Energy AMA Supercross Series and 12 race Lucas Oil Pro Motocross Championship with a four rider roster in the 250 class on the new 2016 RMZ250 Suzuki.
