= Repeat after me song =

A repeat after me song (also known as an echo song) is a type of song where a leader sings or says a verse followed by another person, audience repeating what they say. This is common for campfires, particularly among youth.

== See also ==
- Chant
