= Primum non nocere =

Maxim in bioethics meaning "first, do no harm"

Primum non nocere (Classical Latin: [ˈpriːmũː noːn nɔˈkeːrɛ]) is a Latin phrase that means "first, do no harm". The phrase is sometimes recorded as primum nil nocere.

Non-maleficence, which is derived from the maxim, is one of the principal precepts of bioethics that all students in healthcare are taught in school and is a fundamental principle throughout the world. Another way to state it is that, "given an existing problem, it may be better not to do something, or even to do nothing, than to risk causing more harm than good." It reminds healthcare personnel to consider the possible harm that any intervention might do. It is invoked when debating the use of an intervention that carries an obvious risk of harm but a less certain chance of benefit.

Non-maleficence is often contrasted with its complement, beneficence. Young and Wagner argued that, for healthcare professionals and other professionals subject to a moral code, in general beneficence takes priority over non-maleficence (“first, do good,” not “first, do no harm”) both historically and philosophically. Indeed, beneficence is the Hippocratic priority both in the Oath and in Epidemics I, which "First do no harm" and "Primum non nocere" reverse quite contrarily to Hippocratic and other classical authorities.

== Origin ==
The origin of the phrase is uncertain. Some early versions of the Hippocratic Oath include the promise "to abstain from doing harm" (Greek: ἐπὶ δηλήσει δὲ καὶ ἀδικίῃ εἴρξειν) but do not include the precise phrase. Perhaps the closest approximation in the Hippocratic Corpus is in Epidemics: "The physician must ... have two special objects in view with regard to disease, namely, to do good or to do no harm" (book I, sect. 11, trans. Adams, Greek: ἀσκέειν, περὶ τὰ νοσήματα, δύο, ὠφελέειν, ἢ μὴ βλάπτειν).

According to Gonzalo Herranz, Professor of Medical Ethics at the University of Navarra, Primum non nocere was introduced into American and British medical culture by Worthington Hooker in his 1847 book Physician and Patient. Hooker attributed it to the Parisian pathologist and clinician Auguste François Chomel (1788–1858), the successor of Laennec in the chair of medical pathology, and the preceptor of Pierre Louis. Apparently, the axiom was part of Chomel's oral teaching. Hooker, however, was quoting an earlier work by Elisha Bartlett who, on pages 288–289, says "The golden axiom of Chomel, that it is only the second law of therapeutics to do good, its first law being this – not to do harm – is gradually finding its way into the medical mind, preventing an incalculable amount of positive ill." However, Hooker used neither the specific expression, nor the traditional Latin phrase.

A detailed investigation of the origins of the aphorism was reported by the clinical pharmacologist Cedric M. Smith in the April 2005 issue of The Journal of Clinical Pharmacology. It addresses the questions of the origin and chronology of appearance of the maxim. Rather than being of ancient origin as usually assumed, the specific expression, and its even more distinctive associated Latin phrase, has been traced back to an attribution to Thomas Sydenham (1624–1689) in a book by Thomas Inman (1860), Foundation for a New Theory and Practice of Medicine. Inman's book and his attribution were reviewed by an author who signed simply as "H. H." in The American Journal of the Medical Sciences, also in 1860. Smith's article also reviews the various uses of the now popular aphorism, its limitations as a moral injunction, and its increasingly frequent use in a variety of contexts.

The origin stories are probably apocryphal, and the true origins in either language, or any language, misty and proverbial.

An American surgeon, L.A. Stimson, used the expression in 1879 and again in 1906 (in the same journal). That it was in common use by the 20th century is apparent from later mentions, such as by the prominent obstetrician J. Whitridge Williams in 1911, as well as detailed discussion of its use in a popular book authored by Dr. Morris Fishbein, editor of The Journal of the American Medical Association in 1930.

== See also ==
- Ahimsa
- Ethics
- Harm principle
- Iatrogenesis
- Leaving the world a better place
- Meta-ethics
- Non-aggression principle
- Non-violence
- Nursing ethics
- Principlism
