= Leave the gate as you found it =

Rule of courtesy in rural areas

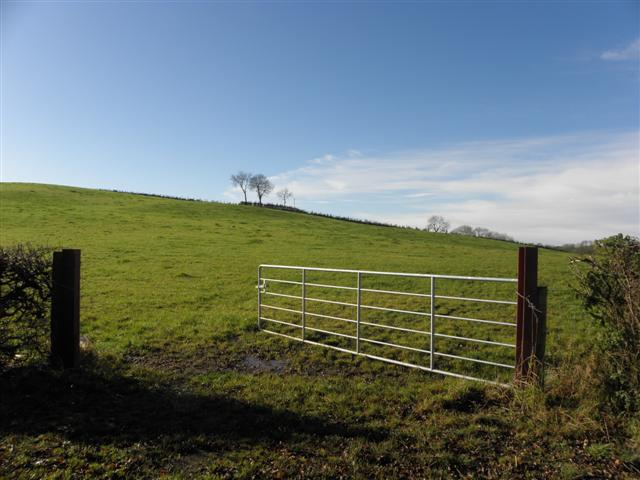
An open gate to a field

Leave the gate as you found it (or leave all gates as found) is an important rule of courtesy in rural areas throughout the world. If a gate is found open, it should be left open, and if it is closed, it should be left closed. If a closed gate absolutely must be traversed, it should be closed again afterwards. It applies to visitors travelling onto or across farms, ranches, and stations.

In low-rainfall areas, closing gates can cut livestock off from water supplies. For example, most of the land used for grazing in Australia has no natural water supplies, so drinking water for the stock must be supplied by the farmer or landowner, often by using a windmill to pump groundwater. Even visitors who know how a stock water system works may be unaware of breakdowns. During hot weather, cattle require large quantities of water to drink and can die in less than a day if they do not get it. Sheep need less water and can survive longer without it, but will die if cut off from water for several hot days.

In all agricultural areas, farmers need to keep groups of livestock separate, for reasons including breeding for disease resistance and increased production, pest control, and controlling when ewes deliver their lambs. Unwanted mingling of flocks or herds can deprive a farmer of significant income.

The original versions of the United Kingdom's Country Code advised visitors to always close gates. The revised Countryside Code now suggests that gates should be left as found.

== See also ==
- Leave No Trace
- Leaving the world a better place
