= Leaving the world a better place =

Ethical principle

Leaving the world a better place, often called the campsite rule, campground rule, or just leaving things better than you found them, is an ethical proposition that individuals should go beyond trying not to do harm in the world, and should try to remediate harms done by others.

== History and application ==
This ethic was articulated by Bessie Anderson Stanley in 1911 (in a quote often misattributed to Ralph Waldo Emerson): "To leave the world a bit better, whether by a healthy child, a garden patch or a redeemed social condition; To know even one life has breathed easier because you have lived. This is to have succeeded." In his last message to the Boy Scouts, founder Robert Baden-Powell wrote: "Try and leave this world a little better than you found it and when your turn comes to die, you can die happy in feeling that at any rate you have not wasted your time but have done your best". American writer William Gaddis, in his 1985 novel, Carpenter's Gothic, disputed the wisdom of this ethic, writing: "Finally realize you can't leave things better than you found them the best you can do is try not to leave them any worse . . ."

Dan Savage, in his syndicated sex-advice column, Savage Love has articulated a variation of the rule for relationships, which he calls the "campsite rule", stating that in any relationship, but particularly those with a large difference of age or experience between the partners, the older or more experienced partner has the responsibility to leave the younger or less experienced partner in at least as good a state (emotionally and physically) as before the relationship. The "campsite rule" includes things like leaving the younger or less experienced partner with no STDs, no unwanted pregnancies, and not overburdening them with emotional and sexual baggage. In 2013, humorist Alexandra Petri premiered a sex comedy play, The Campsite Rule, based on Savage's rule. Savage also created a companion rule, the "tea and sympathy rule" in reference to a line in the play, Tea and Sympathy, in which an older woman asks of a high-school-age boy, right before having sex with him: "Years from now, when you talk about this – and you will – be kind". The companion rule imposes on the younger person in the relationship the requirement to be kind to an older partner who followed the "campsite rule".

In 2015, a crowdsourcing competition to rethink the Ten Commandments called the Rethink Prize included "Leave the world a better place than you found it" as one of the ten winning beliefs selected by a panel of judges. Augustana College bioethicist Deke Gould invoked the "campground rule" in a 2021 article advocating "efforts to design future minds—whether these are full artificial, enhanced biological, or postbiological ones—should aim to produce minds that are not relevantly human‐like".

== See also ==
- Beneficence (ethics)
- Leave No Trace
- Leave the gate as you found it
- Primum non nocere ("First, do no harm")
