= Fire pan =

Pan for holding or conveying fire

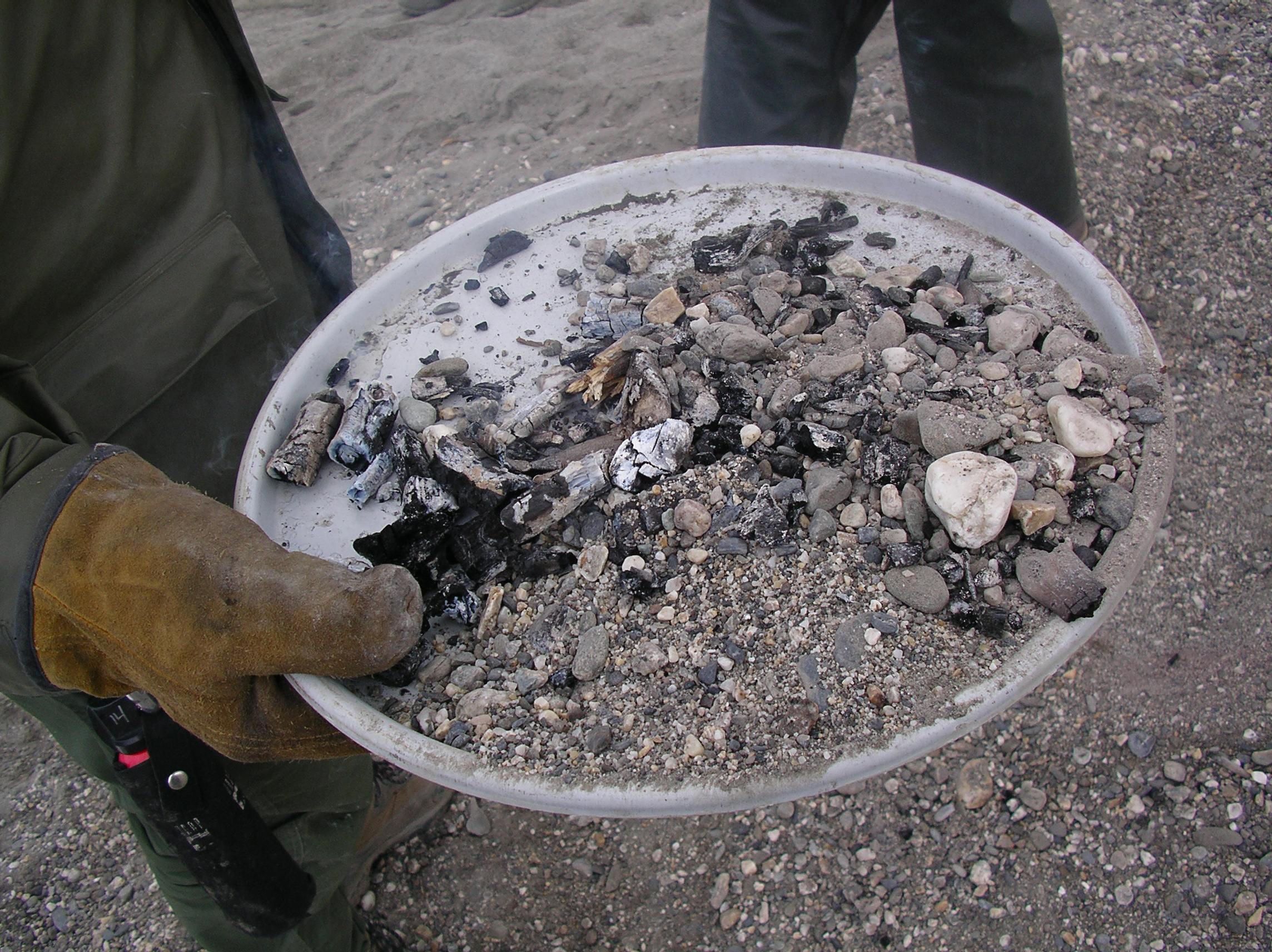
A fire pan being used in a demonstration of a "Leave No Trace" fire

A fire pan is a pan for holding or conveying fire. The use of a fire pan reduces the impact to the ground, vegetation and rocks, and its compact size results in the burning of less wood. Fire pans also allow users to easily burn their accumulated garbage, although the best practice is to only burn paper. Combustible items will be reduced to ash. A fire pan user can leave no trace of the fire, as the ashes can be collected and buried.

== Background ==
Fire pans were initially used by river guides to minimize the impact of their fires but they are becoming increasingly popular with backpackers, campers and other outdoor users. The pan is usually a metal tray with rigid sides at least three inches high such as a metal oil drain pan or a backyard barbecue grill.

== Usage ==
When using a fire pan care should be taken so the heat does not scorch vegetation or sterilize the ground, therefore it is necessary to elevate the pan with rocks or with several inches of mineral soil. Used in winter a fire pan can be placed atop limbs or logs to keep the pan from sinking into the snow. A fire pan can be more convenient than a traditional campfire because it allows the fire to be picked up and moved should the need arise.

== See also ==
- Campfire safety
