= Leave No Trace =

Set of outdoor ethics

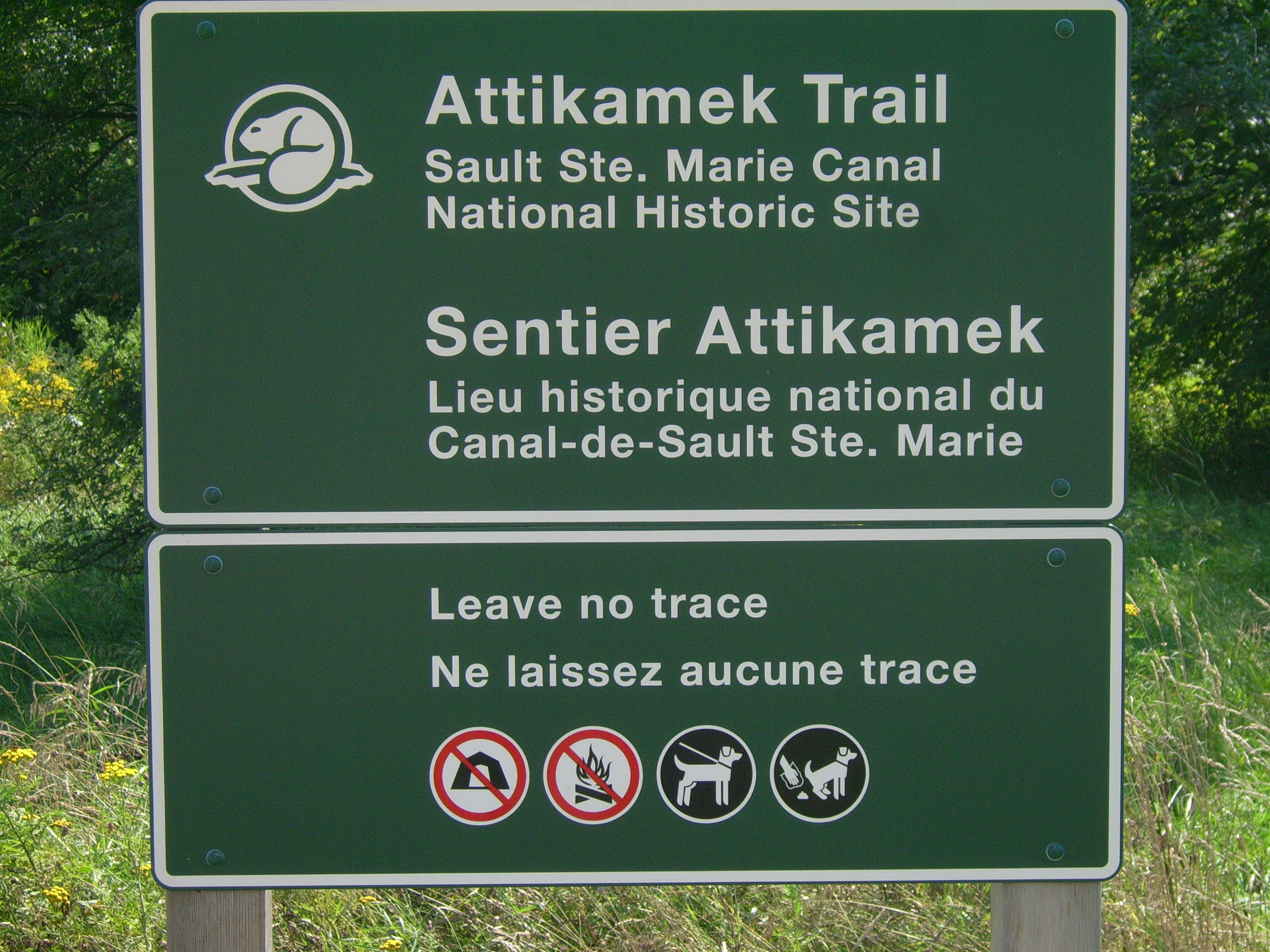
"Leave no trace" sign on the Attikamek Trail near Sault Ste. Marie Canal in Canada

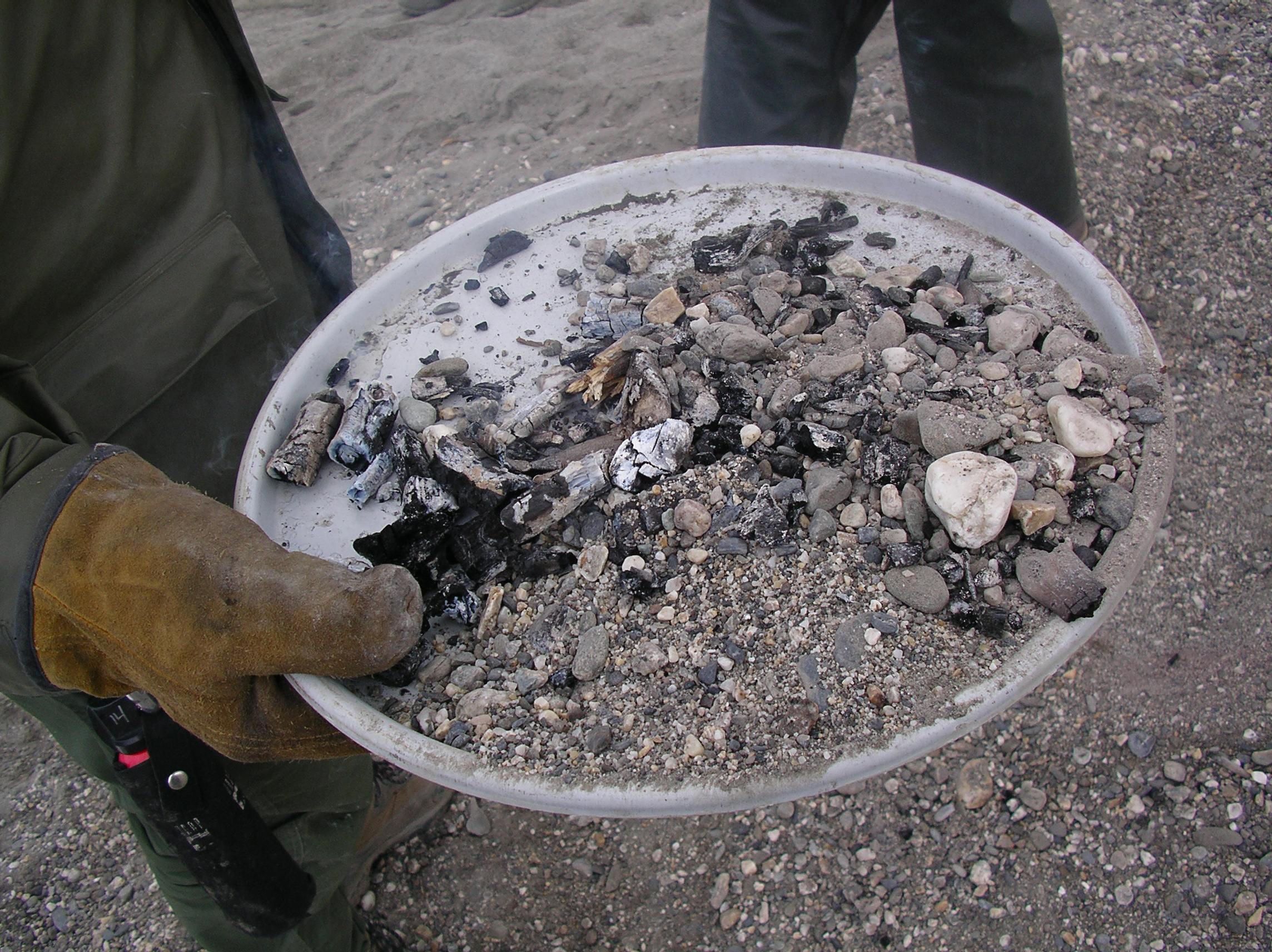
A demonstration of a Leave No Trace fire in a fire pan

Leave No Trace, sometimes written as LNT, is a set of ethics promoting conservation of the outdoors. Originating in the mid-20th century, the concept started as a movement in the United States in response to ecological damage caused by wilderness recreation. In 1994, the non-profit Leave No Trace Center for Outdoor Ethics was formed to create educational resources around LNT, and organized the framework of LNT into seven principles:

1. Plan ahead and prepare
2. Travel and camp on durable surfaces
3. Dispose of waste properly
4. Leave what you find
5. Minimize campfire impacts
6. Respect wildlife
7. Be considerate of others

The idea behind the LNT principles is to leave the wilderness unchanged by human presence.

== History ==
By the 1960s and 1970s, outdoor recreation was becoming more popular, following the creation of equipment such as synthetic tents and sleeping pads. A commercial interest in the outdoors increased the number of visitors to national parks, with the National Park Service seeing a five-fold increase between 1950 and 1970, from 33 million to 172 million. Articles were written about the wild being “loved to death,” problems with overcrowding and ecological damage, and the need for management. To solve this, regulations were imposed, including limits on group sizes and where camping was allowed. This was met negatively, with people writing that it took the joy and spontaneity out of wilderness recreation.

The focus was shifted towards education, with the National Park Service (NPS), United States Forest Service (USFS), and the Bureau of Land Management (BLM) training Wilderness Informational Specialists to teach visitors about minimal impact camping. In 1987, the three departments cooperatively developed a pamphlet titled Leave No Trace Land Ethics.

At the same time, there was a cultural shift in outdoor ethics from woodcraft, where travelers prided themselves on their ability to use available natural resources, to having a minimal impact on the environment by traveling through wilderness as visitors. Groups such as the Sierra Club, the National Outdoor Leadership School (NOLS), and Scouting America were advocating minimum impact camping techniques, and companies like REI and The North Face began sharing the movement.

In 1990, the national education program of Leave No Trace was developed by the USFS in conjunction with NOLS, alongside Smokey Bear, Woodsy Owl, and programs like Tread Lightly! geared towards motorized recreation. The Bureau of Land Management joined the program in 1993 followed by the National Park Service and U.S. Fish and Wildlife Service in 1994.

The number of LNT principles varied widely during the 1990s, starting from 75 and dropping to 6 as more people had input and principles were condensed. However, by 1999, the list was finalized as seven principles and has remained unchanged.

== Principles ==
The principles are as followed:

1. Plan Ahead and Prepare
  - Know the regulations and special concerns for the area you'll visit.
  - Prepare for extreme weather, hazards, and emergencies.
  - Schedule your trip to avoid times of high use.
  - Visit in small groups when possible. Consider splitting larger groups into smaller groups.
  - Repackage food to minimize waste.
  - Use a map and compass or GPS to eliminate the use of marking paint, rock cairns or flagging.
2. Travel and Camp on Durable Surfaces
  - Durable surfaces include maintained trails and designated campsites, rock, gravel, sand, dry grasses or snow.
  - Protect riparian areas by camping at least 61 m (200 ft) from lakes and streams.
  - Good campsites are found, not made. Altering a site is not necessary.
    - In popular areas:
      - Concentrate use on existing trails and campsites.
      - Walk single file in the middle of the trail, even when wet or muddy.
      - Keep campsites small. Focus activity in areas where vegetation is absent.
    - In pristine areas:
      - Disperse use to prevent the creation of campsites and trails.
      - Avoid places where impacts are just beginning.
3. Dispose of Waste Properly
  - Pack it in, pack it out. Inspect your campsite, food preparation areas, and rest areas for trash or spilled foods. Pack out all trash, leftover food and litter.
  - Utilize toilet facilities for defecation whenever possible. Otherwise, deposit solid human waste in catholes dug 6 to 8 inches deep, at least 200 feet from water, camp and trails. Cover and disguise the cathole when finished.
  - Pack out toilet paper and hygiene products.
  - To wash yourself or your dishes, carry water 200 feet away from streams or lakes and use small amounts of biodegradable soap. Scatter strained dishwater.
4. Leave What You Find
  - Preserve the past: examine, photograph, but do not touch cultural or historic structures and artifacts.
  - Leave rocks, plants and other natural objects as you find them.
  - Avoid introducing or transporting non-native species.
  - Do not build structures, furniture, or dig trenches.
5. Minimize Campfire Impacts
  - Campfires can cause lasting impacts to the environment. Use a lightweight stove for cooking and enjoy a candle lantern for light.
  - Where fires are permitted, use established fire rings, fire pans, or mound fires.
  - Keep fires small. Only use down and dead wood from the ground that can be broken by hand.
  - Burn all wood and coals to ash, put out campfires completely, then scatter cool ashes.
6. Respect Wildlife
  - Observe wildlife from a distance. Do not follow or approach them.
  - Never feed animals. Feeding wildlife damages their health, alters natural behaviors, [habituates them to humans], and exposes them to predators and other dangers.
  - Protect wildlife and your food by storing rations and trash securely.
  - Control pets at all times, or leave them at home.
  - Avoid wildlife during sensitive times: mating, nesting, raising young, or winter.
7. Be Considerate of Other Visitors
  - Respect other visitors and protect the quality of their experience.
  - Be courteous. Yield to other users on the trail.
  - Step to the downhill side of the trail when encountering pack stock.
  - Take breaks and camp away from trails and other visitors.
  - Let nature's sounds prevail. Avoid loud voices and noises.

== Organization ==
Leave No Trace Center for Outdoor Ethics
- Formation: 1994
- Type: 501(c)(3) Nonprofit
- Headquarters: Boulder, Colorado, USA
- Executive Director: Dana Watts
- Staff: 18
- Volunteers: 25,000+
- Website: lnt.org

Since 1994, the Leave No Trace program has been managed by the Leave No Trace Center for Outdoor Ethics, a 501(c)(3) non-profit organization, dedicated to the responsible enjoyment and active stewardship of the outdoors worldwide. Leave No Trace works to build awareness, appreciation and respect for wildlands through education, research, volunteerism and partnerships. The center also has a youth education initiative, Leave No Trace for Every Kid, which emphasizes asset development in youth through the lens of outdoor stewardship.

The center has partnerships with the National Park Service, the U.S. Forest Service, the Bureau of Land Management, the U.S. Fish and Wildlife Service, US Army Corps of Engineers, and other partners such as colleges, universities, guide services, small businesses, non-profits and youth-serving organizations such as the Boy Scouts of America and the American Camp Association.

Over 20 percent of the organization's 2019 income went to three members of their board of directors.

There are also formal Leave No Trace organizations in Australia, Canada, Ireland and New Zealand.

== Criticism ==
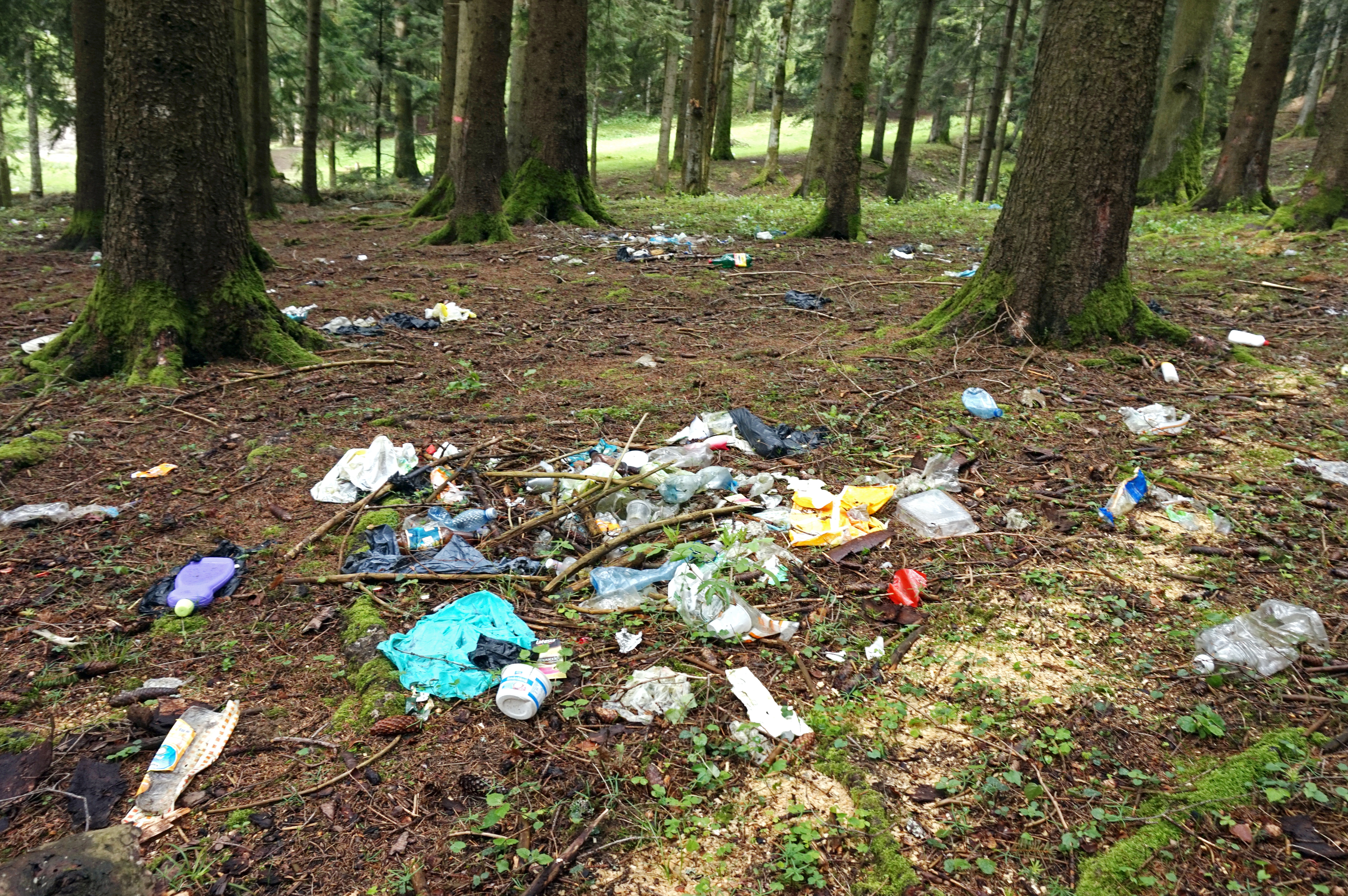
Litter in a forest in Romania. As well as spoiling the view, discarded waste can cause damage to plants and animals in the environment.

While Leave No Trace is a widely accepted conservationist ethic, there has been some criticism. In 2002, environmental historian James Morton Turner argued that Leave No Trace focused "largely on protecting wilderness" rather than tackling questions such as the "economy, consumerism, and the environment", and that it "helped ally the modern backpacker with the wilderness recreation industry" by encouraging backpackers to purchase products advertising Leave No Trace, or asking people to bring a petroleum stove instead of building a natural campfire.

In 2009, Gregory Simon and Peter Alagona argued that there should be a move beyond Leave No Trace, and that the ethic "disguises much about human relationships with non-human nature" by making it seem that parks and wilderness areas are "pristine nature" which "erases their human histories, and prevents people from understanding how these landscapes have developed over time through complex human–environment interactions". They posit that there should be a new environmental ethic "that transforms the critical scholarship of social science into a critical practice of wilderness recreation, addresses the global economic system...and reinvents wilderness recreation as a more collaborative, participatory, productive, democratic, and radical form of political action". They also write about how "the LNT logo becomes both a corporate brand and an official stamp of approval" in outdoor recreation stores like REI.

The authors articulate their new environmental ethic as expanding LNT, not rejecting it all together, and share the seven principles of what they call 'Beyond Leave No Trace':

1. Educate yourself and others about the places you visit
2. Purchase only the equipment and clothing you need
3. Take care of the equipment and clothing you have
4. Make conscientious food, equipment, and clothing consumption choices
5. Minimize waste production
6. Reduce energy consumption
7. Get involved by conserving and restoring the places you visit

In 2012, in response to critiques of their 2009 article, Simon and Alagona wrote that they "remain steadfast in our endorsement of LNT’s value and potential" but that they believe that "this simple ethic is not enough in a world of global capital circulation." They write that Leave No Trace "could not exist in its current form without a plethora of consumer products;" that "the use of such products does not erase environmental impacts;" and that LNT "systematically obscures these impacts, displacements, and connections by encouraging the false belief that it is possible to 'leave no trace'".

Other critics of Leave No Trace have argued that it is impractical, displaces environmental impacts to other locations, "obscures connections between the uses of outdoor products and their production and disposal impacts" and have questioned how much the ethic affects everyday environmental behavior.

== See also ==
- Clean climbing
- Leave the gate as you found it
- Leaving the world a better place
- "Rules of the Trail" (as applied in mountain biking)
- The Country Code
- Trail ethics
- Tread Lightly!
- Outdoor Code
