= Trail ethics =

Socially acceptable behaviors on recreational trails

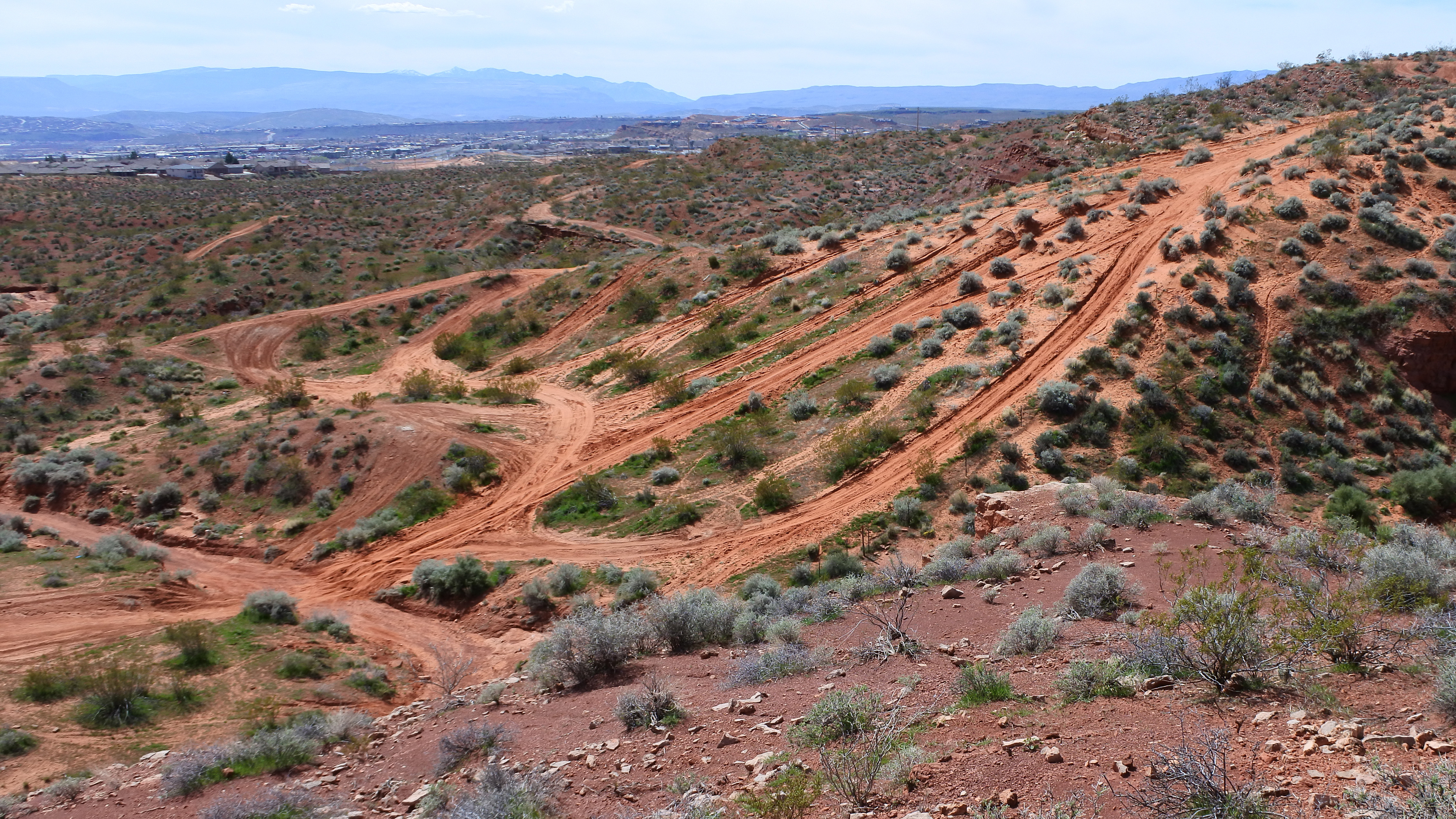
Off-road vehicle impact in SW Utah.

Trail ethics define appropriate ranges of behavior for hikers on a public trail. It is similar to both environmental ethics and human rights in that it deals with the shared interaction of humans and nature. There are multiple agencies and groups that support and encourage ethical behavior on trails.

Trail ethics applies to the use of trails, by pedestrians, dog walkers, hikers, backpackers, mountain bikers, equestrians, hunters, and off-road vehicles.

== Etiquette ==
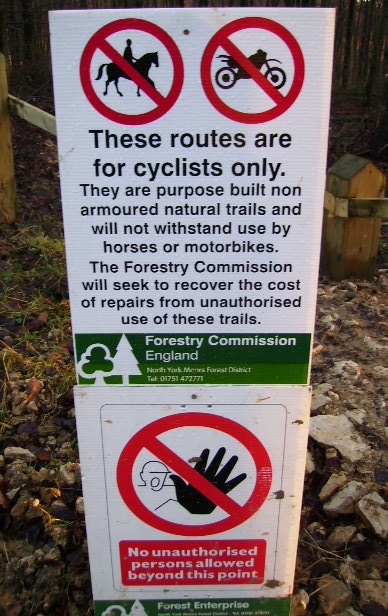
Sometimes trail use is regulated.

Sometimes conflicts can develop between different types of users of a trail or pathway. Etiquette has developed to minimize such interference. Examples include:

- When two groups meet on a steep trail, sometimes the group moving uphill is given the right-of-way.
- Trail-users generally avoid making loud sounds, such as shouting or loud conversation, playing music, or the use of mobile phones.
- Trail-users must avoid impacting the land through which they travel. Users can avoid impact by staying on established trails, and durable surfaces, not picking plants, or disturbing wildlife, and carrying garbage out. The Leave No Trace movement offers a for low-impact hiking: "Leave nothing but footprints. Take nothing but photos. Kill nothing but time. Keep nothing but memories".
- The feeding of wild animals is dangerous and can cause harm to both the animals and to other people.
- Mountain bikers must yield to both hikers and riders on horses (equestrians), unless the trail is clearly designated and marked for bike-only travel. Hikers yield to equestrians.

== Trails in urban areas ==
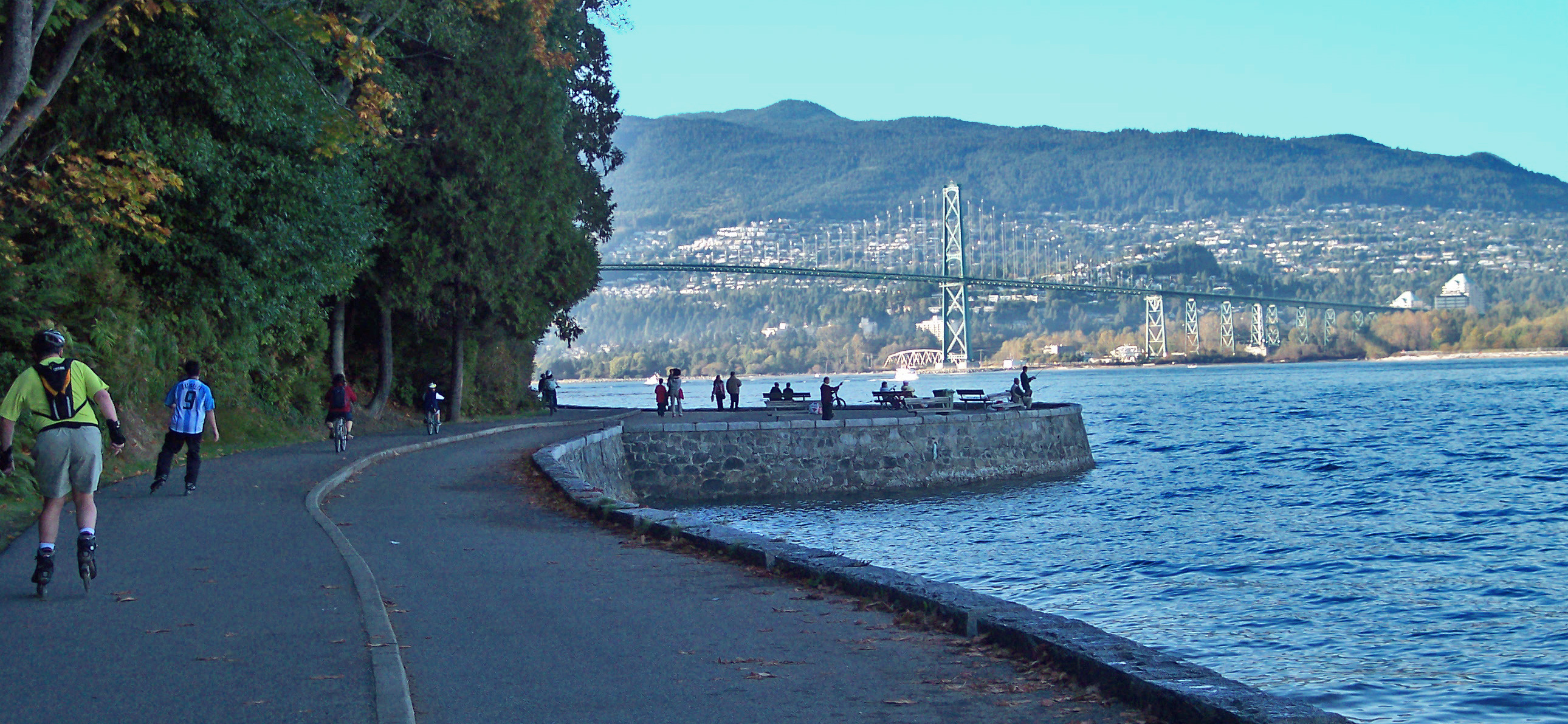
Stanley Park seawall path, Vancouver, British Columbia. which is divided so as to separate skaters and walkers

Some cities have worked to add pathways for pedestrians and cyclists. This can reduce the amount of vehicle traffic in busy urban areas, and make visiting downtown areas more pleasant. There can be difficulties when a path is used by people travelling at different speeds, such as pedestrians, joggers, and cyclists, and the appropriate etiquette is not observed.

== Off road vehicles ==
In the US, off-road vehicle (ORV) use on public land has been criticized by some members of the government and environmental organizations including the Sierra Club and The Wilderness Society. They have noted several consequences of illegal ORV use such as pollution, trail damage, erosion, land degradation, possible species extinction, and habitat destruction which can leave hiking trails impassable. ORV proponents argue that legal use taking place under planned access along with the multiple environment and trail conservation efforts by ORV groups will mitigate these issues. Groups such as the Blue-ribbon Coalition advocate Treadlightly, which is the responsible use of public lands used for off-road activities.

== See also ==
- Tread Lightly!
- Leave No Trace
- "Rules of the Trail" (as applied in Mountain biking)
- Clean Trails
- Conservation ethic
- Environmental ethics
