= Campfire story =

Form of oral storytelling performed around an open fire at night

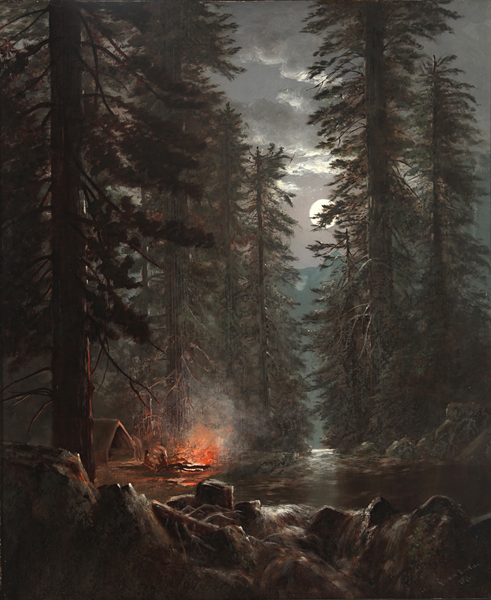
Campfire in the Redwoods by Edwin Deakin (1876), Laguna Art Museum.

In North America, a campfire story is a form of oral storytelling performed around an open fire at night, typically in the wilderness, largely connected with the telling of stories having supernatural motifs or elements of urban legend. Whereas the activity is not incomparable to, nor mutually exclusive from indigenous practices, they should not be confused with each other in a contemporary context.

== History ==
The modern campfire story is an invention of the late modern period and may have arisen among soldiers or frontiersmen who utilized storytelling as a nightly means to stay awake while acting as camp lookouts. In North America, as early as the 1840s, the term "camp-fire story" was associated with wartime exploits such as those told in a military encampment. In the late 1800s, advertisements, for journals and lectures, providing the inclusion of "camp-fire stories" began to appear. Contemporaneously, fraternities and other organizations would arrange reunions among veterans who then continued the tradition in peacetime and even outside the confines of a camp. The term likewise began to be connected with encounters with large or dangerous game, such as bears, buffaloes, panthers or snakes.

With the formation of youth groups, such as Girl Scouts and Boy Scouts of America, came the adoption of practices already established by organizations of the day. Consequently, campfire stories came to be an integral part within such organizations nearly since their inception. In the first edition of the official handbook for the Boy Scouts of America, chapter three on "Campcraft" provides many notes for campfire entertainment including those on storytelling. While the example story provided is an adaptation of Native American oral tradition, the criteria for stories given are as follows: "Indian legends, war stories, ghost stories, detective stories, stories of heroism, the history of life, a talk about the stars." It is among these early youth groups that the understanding of a campfire story came to be broadened and signaled a major shift in audience from veterans to a more general public. Likewise, the very nature of such organizations present factors conducive to stories of the supernatural, namely, the introduction of younger groups of listeners far more impressionable to stories of a frightful or fantastic nature. In time, the popularity of the latter would come to be predominant and greatly eclipse other genre stories.

== Camping activity ==
Campfire stories hold a strong association with camping as a form of recreation. Author William W. Forgey, in the introduction to his 1984 book Campfire Stories ... Things That Go Bump in the Night, noted that in his ten years of service as a scoutmaster, the most requested campfire event were stories that evoke fear. Forgey further identified a number of elements that should go into the telling of a campfire story:

1. Enjoy the practice
2. Maintain eye contact
3. Keep in close contact with audience
4. Do not obsess over details
5. Set a "quiet mood" prior to the story
6. Utilize the energy of the audience
7. Maintain the campfire
8. Forgo props or scare tactics, these distract from the story
9. Use different vocal inflections
10. Start sessions with believable tales to build credibility

Forgey's points emphasize an important distinction of the campfire story as a practice rather than a genre, as is the case with ghost stories or urban legends. The campfire story, while having a strong association with horror or the supernatural, is not a subset or class of tales but an outdoor activity, as much so as hiking, rock climbing or swimming. It is also for many a rite of passage into the years directly preceding preadolescence.

== See also ==
- Folklore of the United States
- Canadian folklore
