= Campfire =

Fire lit at a campsite

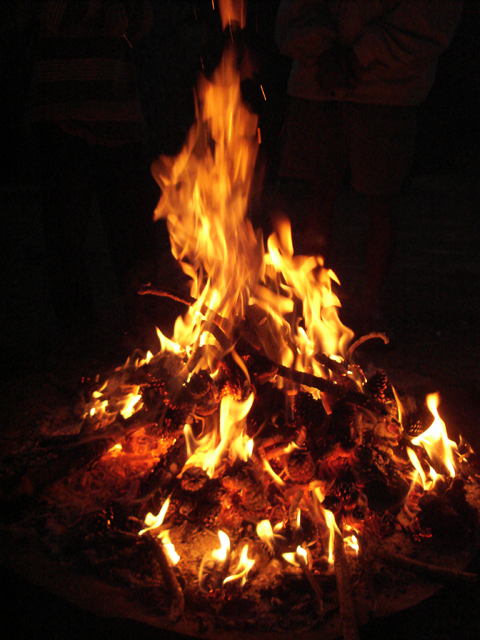
A campfire made using twigs and pine cones.

A campfire is a fire at a campsite that provides light, warmth, and heat for cooking. It can also serve as a beacon and an insect and predator deterrent. Established campgrounds often provide a stone or steel fire ring for safety. Campfires are a popular feature of camping. At summer camps, the word campfire often refers to an event (ceremony, get together, etc.) at which there is a fire. Some camps refer to the fire itself as a campfire.

== History ==
=== First campfire ===
An analysis of burned antelope bones from caves in Swartkrans, South Africa, confirms that Australopithecus robustus and/or Homo erectus built campfires roughly 1.6 million years ago. Evidence within Wonderwerk Cave, at the edge of the Kalahari Desert, has been called the oldest known controlled fire. Microscopic analysis of plant ash and charred bone fragments suggests that materials in the cave were not heated above about 1,300 °F (704 °C). This is consistent with preliminary findings that the fires burned grasses, brush, and leaves. Such fuel would produce weak flames. The data suggests humans were cooking prey by campfire as far back as the first appearance of Homo erectus 1.9 million years ago.

== Safety ==
=== Finding a site ===
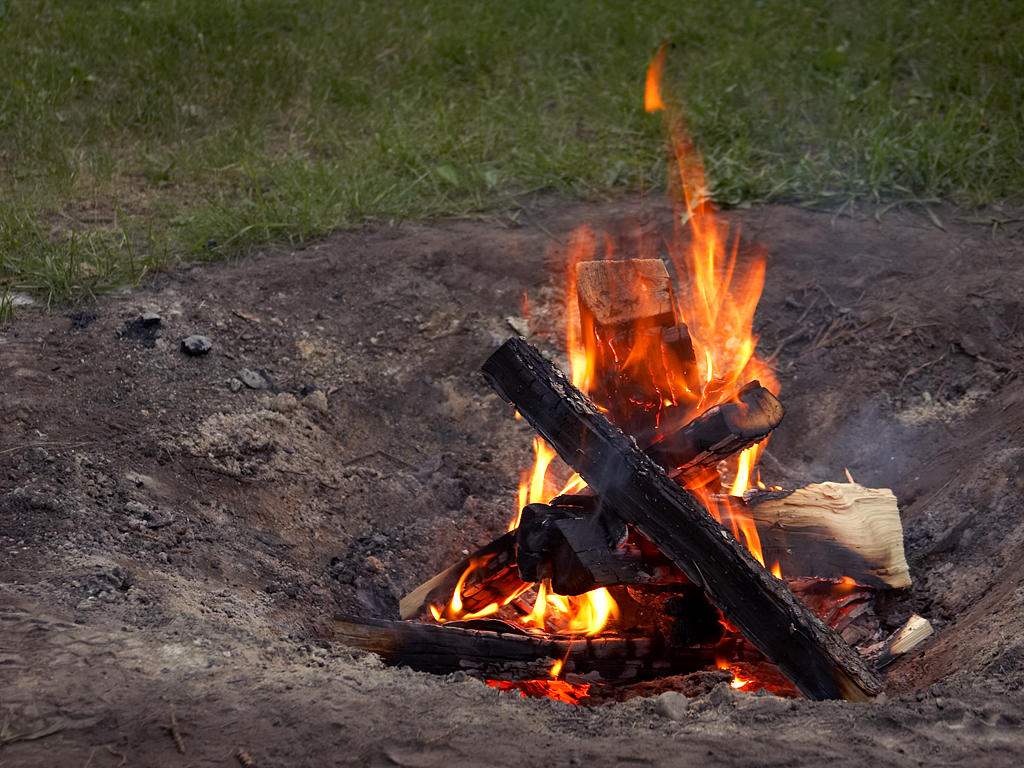
A small fire in a backyard fire pit. Dousing a campfire or fireplace with soapy water and detergent is not a good idea. While it may seem like a good way to extinguish the fire, the soapy water can actually cause things to become worse. Unless the fire has been extinguished and only hot ash remains.

Ideally, campfires should be made in a fire ring. If a fire ring is not available, a temporary fire site may be constructed. Bare rock or unvegetated ground is ideal for a fire site. Alternatively, turf may be cut away to form a bare area and carefully replaced after the fire has cooled to minimize damage. Another way is to cover the ground with sand, or other soil mostly free of flammable organic material, to a depth of a few inches. A ring of rocks is sometimes constructed around a fire. Fire rings, however, do not fully protect material on the ground from catching fire. Flying embers are still a threat, and the fire ring may become hot enough to ignite material in contact with it, or heat the water to a vapor thereby cracking the rocks.

=== Safety measures ===
Campfires can spark wildfires. As such, it is important for the fire builder to take multiple safety precautions, including:

- Avoiding building campfires under hanging branches or over steep slopes, and clear a ten-foot diameter circle around the fire of all flammable debris.
- Having enough water nearby and a shovel to smother an out-of-control fire with dirt.
- Minimizing the size of the fire to prevent problems from occurring.
- Never leaving a campfire unattended.
- When extinguishing a campfire, using plenty of water or dirt, then stirring the mixture and add more water, then check that there are no burning embers left whatsoever.
- Never bury hot coals, as they can continue to burn and cause root fires or wildfires. Be aware of roots if digging a hole for your fire.
- Making sure the fire pit is large enough for the campfire and there are no combustibles near the campfire, and avoiding the construction of the campfire on a windy day.

== Types of fuel ==
There are three types of material involved in building a fire without manufactured fuels or modern conveniences such as lighters:

Pitchwood from a fir stump

1. Tinder lights easily and is used to start an enduring campfire. It is anything that can be lit with a spark and is usually classified as being thinner than a human's pinky finger. The tinder of choice before matches and lighters was amadou next to flint and steel. A few decent natural tinders are cotton, birch bark, cedar bark, and fatwood, where available; followed by dead, dry pine needles or grass; a more comprehensive list is given in the article on tinder. Although not natural, steel wool makes excellent tinder and can be started with steel and flint, or a 9 volt battery without difficulty.
2. Kindling wood is an arbitrary classification including anything bigger than tinder but smaller than fuel wood. In fact, there are gradations of kindling, from sticks thinner than a finger to those as thick as a wrist. A quantity of kindling sufficient to fill a hat may be enough, but more is better. A faggot is a related term indicating a bundle of small branches used to feed a small fire or continue developing a bigger fire out of a small one.
3. Fuel wood can be different types of timber. Timber ranges from small logs two or three inches (76 mm) across to larger logs that can burn for hours. It is typically difficult to gather without a hatchet or other cutting tool. In heavily used campsites, fuel wood can be hard to find, so it may have to purchased at a nearby store or be brought from home. However, untreated wood should not be transported due to the probability that invasive species of bugs will be transported with it. Heat-treated wood such as kiln-dried lumber is safe to transport. In the United States, areas that allow camping, like state parks and national parks, often let campers collect firewood lying on the ground. Some parks do not do this for various reasons, e.g. if they have erosion problems from campgrounds near dunes. Parks almost always forbid cutting living trees, and may also prohibit collecting dead parts of standing trees.

In most realistic cases nowadays, non-natural additions to the fuels mentioned above will be used. Often, charcoal lighters like hexamine fuel tablets or ethyl alcohol will be used to start the fire, as well as various types of scrap paper. With the proliferation of packaged food, it is quite likely that plastics will be incinerated as well, a practice that not only produces toxic fumes but will also leave polluted ashes behind because of incomplete combustion at too-low open fire temperatures.

== Construction styles ==
There are a variety of designs to choose from in building a campfire. A functional design is important in the early stages of a fire. Most of them make no mention of fuelwood—in most designs, fuelwood is never placed on a fire until the kindling is burning strongly.

=== Teepee ===
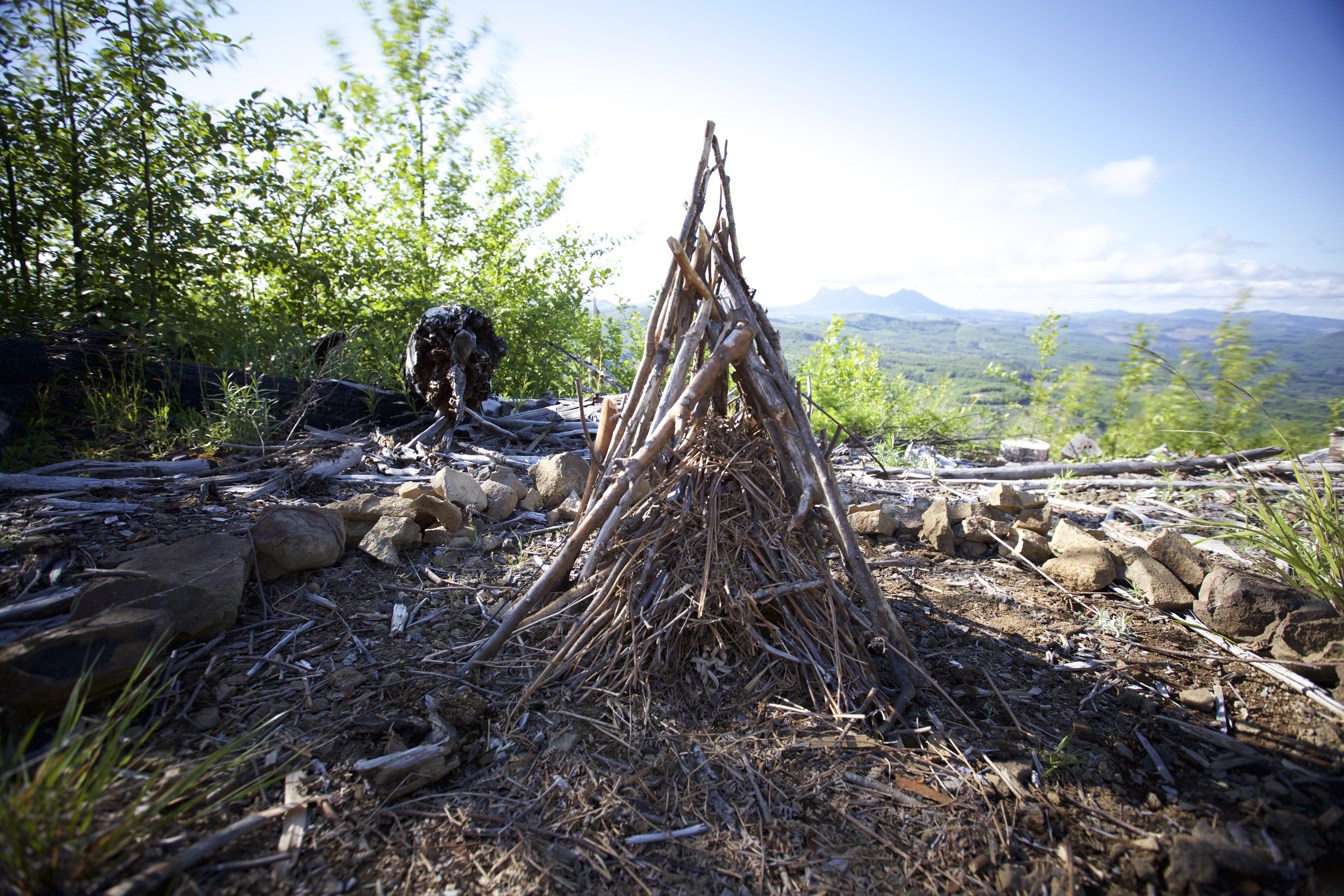
Teepee style campfire

The tipi (or teepee) fire-build takes some patience to construct. First, the tinder is piled up in a compact heap. The smaller kindling is arranged around it, like the poles of a tipi. For added strength, it may be possible to lash some of the sticks together. A tripod lashing is quite difficult to execute with small sticks, so a clove hitch should suffice. (Synthetic rope should be avoided since it produces pollutants when it burns.) Then the larger kindling is arranged above the smaller kindling, taking care not to collapse the tipi. A separate tipi as a shell around the first one may work better. Tipi fires are excellent for producing heat to keep people warm. The gases from the bottom quickly come to the top as you add more sticks.

One downside to a Tipi fire is that when it burns, the logs become unstable and can fall over. This is especially concerning with a large fire.

=== Log cabin ===
A log cabin fire-build likewise begins with a tinder pile. The kindling is then stacked around it, as in the construction of a log cabin. The first two kindling sticks are laid parallel to each other, on opposite sides of the tinder pile. The second pair is laid on top of the first, at right angles to it, and also on opposite sides of the tinder. More kindling is added in the same manner. The smallest kindling is placed over the top of the assembly. Of all the fire-builds, the log cabin is the least vulnerable to premature collapse, but it is also inefficient because it makes the worst use of convection to ignite progressively larger pieces of fuel. However, these qualities make the log cabin an ideal cooking fire as it burns for a long period of time and can support cookware.

A variation on the log cabin starts with two pieces of fuelwood with a pile of tinder between them, and small kindling laid over the tops of the logs, above the tinder. The tinder is lit, and the kindling is allowed to catch fire. When it is burning briskly, it is broken and pushed down into the consumed tinder, and the larger kindling is placed over the top of the logs. When that is burning well, it is also pushed down. Eventually, a pile of kindling burns between two pieces of fuelwood, and soon the logs catch fire from it.

Another variation is called the funeral pyre method because it is used for building funeral pyres. Its main difference from the standard log cabin is that it starts with thin pieces and moves up to thick pieces. If built on a large scale, this type of fire-build collapses in a controlled manner without restricting the airflow.

=== Hybrid ===
A hybrid-style fire

A hybrid fire combines the elements of both the tipi and the log cabin creating an easily lit yet stable fire structure. The hybrid is made by first erecting a small tipi and then proceeding to construct a log cabin around it. This fire structure combines benefits of both fire types: the tipi allows the fire to ignite easily and the log cabin sustains the fire for a long time.

=== Cross-fire ===
A cross-fire is built by positioning two pieces of wood with the tinder in between. Once the fire is burning well, additional pieces of wood are placed on top in layers that alternate directions. This type of fire creates coals suitable for cooking.

=== Lean-to ===
A lean-to fire-build starts with the same pile of tinder as the tipi fire-build. Then, a long, thick piece of kindling is driven into the ground at an angle, so that it overhangs the tinder pile. The smaller pieces of kindling are leaned against the big stick so that the tinder is enclosed between them.

In an alternative method, a large piece of fuelwood or log can be placed on the ground next to the tinder pile. Then kindling is placed with one end propped up by the larger piece of fuelwood, and the other resting on the ground so that the kindling is leaning over the tinder pile. This method is useful in very high winds, as the piece of fuel wood acts as a windbreak.

=== Rakovalkea ===
A traditional Finnish rakovalkea

The traditional Finnish rakovalkea (lit. 'slit bonfire'), or nying in Scandinavian languages, also called by English terms long log fire or gap fire, is constructed by placing one long and thick piece of fuelwood (log) atop another, parallel, and bolstering them in place with four sturdy posts driven into the ground. Traditionally, whole un-split tree trunks provide the fuelwood. Kindling and tinder are placed between the logs in sufficient quantity (while avoiding the very ends) to raise the upper log and allow ventilation. The tinder is always lit at the center so the bolstering posts near the ends do not burn prematurely.

The rakovalkea has two significant features. First, it burns slowly but steadily when lit; it does not require arduous maintenance, but burns for a very long time. A well constructed rakovalkea of two thick logs of two meters in length can warm two lean-to shelters for a whole sleeping shift. The construction causes the logs themselves to protect the fire from the wind. Thus, exposure to smoke is unlikely for the sleepers; nevertheless someone should always watch in case of an emergency. Second, it can be easily scaled to larger sizes (for a feast) limited only by the length of available tree trunks. The arrangement is also useful as beacon fire, i.e. a temporary light signal for ships far in the sea.

=== Swedish torch ===
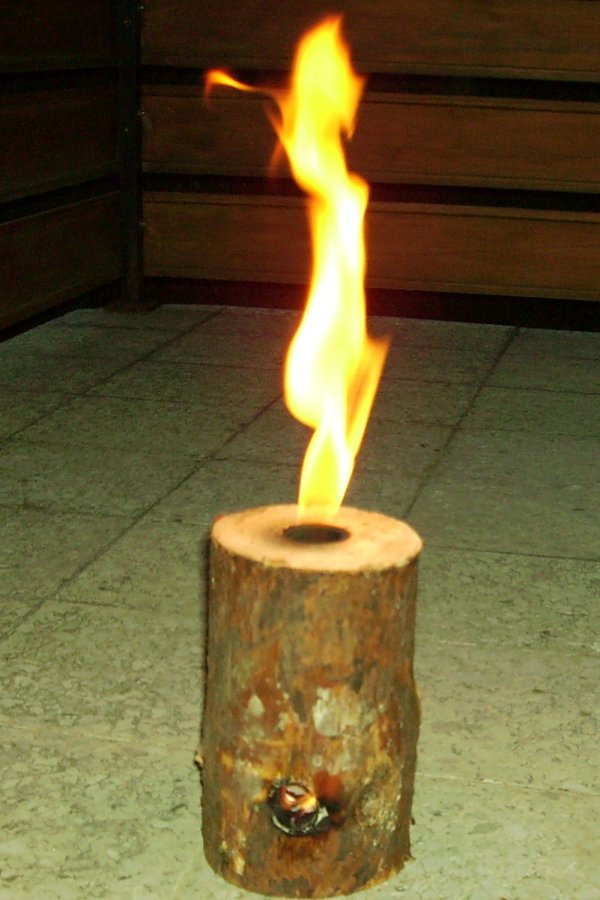
Schwedenfackel

The Swedish torch (Schwedenfackel or Schwedenfeuer) is also known by other names, including Swedish (log) candle, and Swedish log stove.

This fire is unique because it uses only one piece of fairly-sized wood as its fuel. The log is partially cut (though some variants involve completely splitting it) and then set upright. Ideally, the log should be cut evenly and placed on a level surface for stability. Tinder and kindling are added to the preformed chamber created by the initial cuts. Eventually, the fire becomes self-feeding. The flat, circular top provides a surface for placing a kettle or pan for cooking, boiling liquids, and more. In some instances, the elevated position of the fire can serve as a better beacon than a typical ground-based campfire.

=== Keyhole fire ===
A keyhole fire is made in a keyhole-shaped fire ring, and is used in cooking. The large round area is used to build a fire to create coals. As coals develop, they are scraped into the rectangular area used for cooking.

=== Top lighter ===
A "top lighter" fire is built similar to a log cabin or pyre, but instead of the tinder and kindling being placed inside the cabin, it is placed in a tipi on top. The small tipi is lighted on top, and the coals eventually fall down into the log cabin. Outdoor youth organizations often build these fires for "council fires" or ceremonial fires. They burn predictably, and with some practice a builder can estimate how long they will last. They also do not throw off much heat, which isn't needed for a ceremonial fire. The fire burns from the top down, with the layer of hot coals and burning stubs igniting the next layer down.

Another variation to the top lighter, log cabin, or pyre is known by several names, most notably the pyramid, self-feeding, and upside-down method. The reasoning for this method are twofold. First, the layers of fuelwood take in the heat from the initial tinder/kindling, therefore, it is not lost to the surrounding ground. In effect, the fire is "off the ground", and burns its way down through its course. And secondly, this fire type requires minimal labor, thereby making it ideal as a fire of choice before bedding down for the evening without having to get up periodically to add fuelwood and/or stoke the fire to keep it going. Start by adding the largest fuelwood in a parallel "layer", then continue to add increasingly smaller and smaller fuelwood layers perpendicularly to the last layer. Once enough wood is piled, there should be a decent "platform" to make the tipi [tinder/kindling] to initiate the fire.

=== Dakota smokeless pit fire ===
Dakota fire pit

A Dakota smokeless pit fire is a tactical fire used by the United States military as the flame produces a low light signature, reduced smoke, and is easier to ignite under strong wind conditions. Two small holes are dug in the ground: one vertical for the firewood and the other slanted to the bottom of the first hole to provide a draft of air for nearly complete combustion. Optional are flat stones to partially cover the first hole and provide support for cookery, and a tree over the pits to disperse the smoke.

=== Star Fire ===
A Star Fire, or Indian Fire, is the fire design often depicted as the campfire of the old West. Typically, three to six logs are laid out like the spokes of a wheel (star-shaped). The fire is started at the "hub" and logs are pushed towards the center as the flames consume them.

== Ignition ==
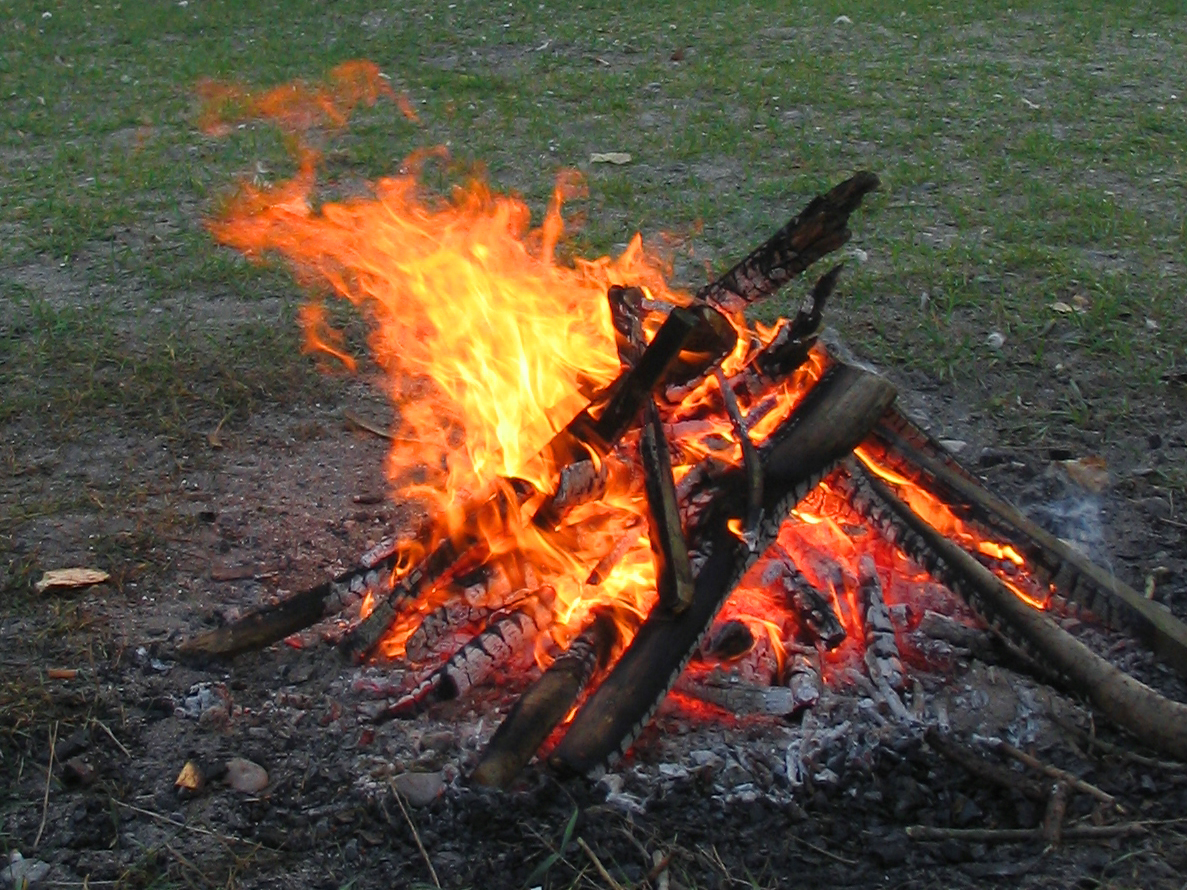
A campfire

Once the fire is built, the tinder is lighted, using one of several methods

- smoldering black carbon powder produced by friction between a stick, or bow drill, or pump drill and a hole or crack on dry wood,
- a magnifying glass focusing sunlight,
- smoldering material produced by a fire piston,
- smoldering black carbon powder produced by a bamboo fire saw
- smoldering material produced by a fire roll (small amount of cotton mixed with ash or iron rust, rolled vigorously between two flat stones or planks, until it starts smoking),
- smoldering material produced by a piece of flint or ferro-rod struck against steel over amadou or other initial tinder, or
- an ignition device, such as a match or a lighter.

A reasonably skilful fire-builder using reasonably good material only needs one match. The tinder burns brightly, but reduced to glowing embers within half a minute. If the kindling does not catch fire, the fire-builder must gather more tinder, determine what went wrong and try to fix it.

One of five problems can prevent a fire from lighting properly: wet wood, wet weather, too little tinder, too much wind, or a lack of oxygen. Rain will douse a fire, but a combination of wind and fog also has a stifling effect. Metal fire rings generally do a good job of keeping out wind, but some of them are so high as to impede the circulation of oxygen in a small fire. To make matters worse, these tall fire rings also make it very difficult to blow on the fire properly.

A small, enclosed fire that has slowed down may require vigorous blowing to get it going again, but excess blowing can extinguish a fire. Most large fires easily create their own circulation, even in unfavourable conditions, but the variant log-cabin fire-build suffers from a chronic lack of air so long as the initial structure is maintained.

Once large kindling is burning, all kindling is placed in the fire, then the fuel wood is placed on top of it (unless, as in the rakovalkea fire-build, it is already there).

== Activities ==
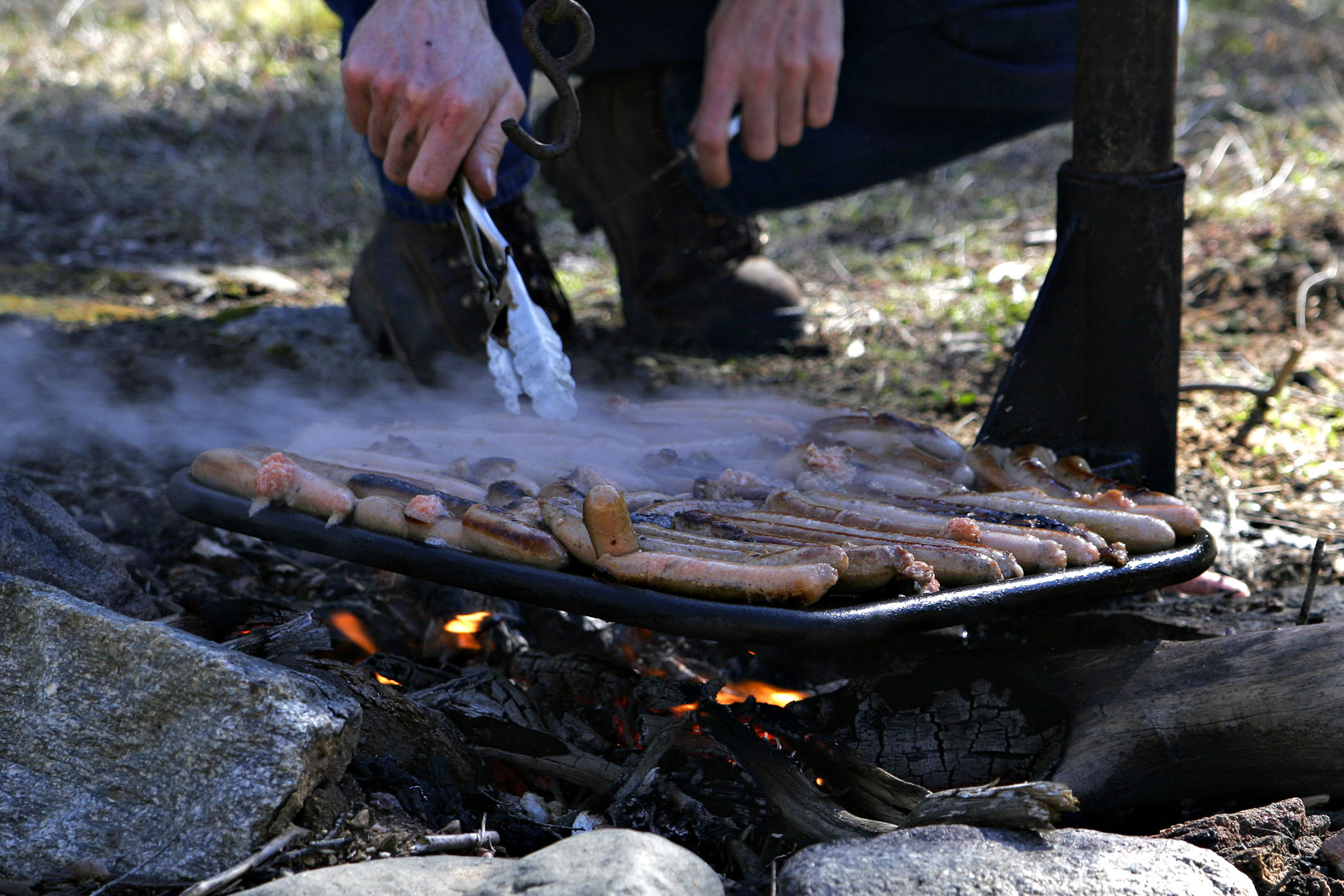
Australian "snags" (English-style sausages) cooking on a campfire.

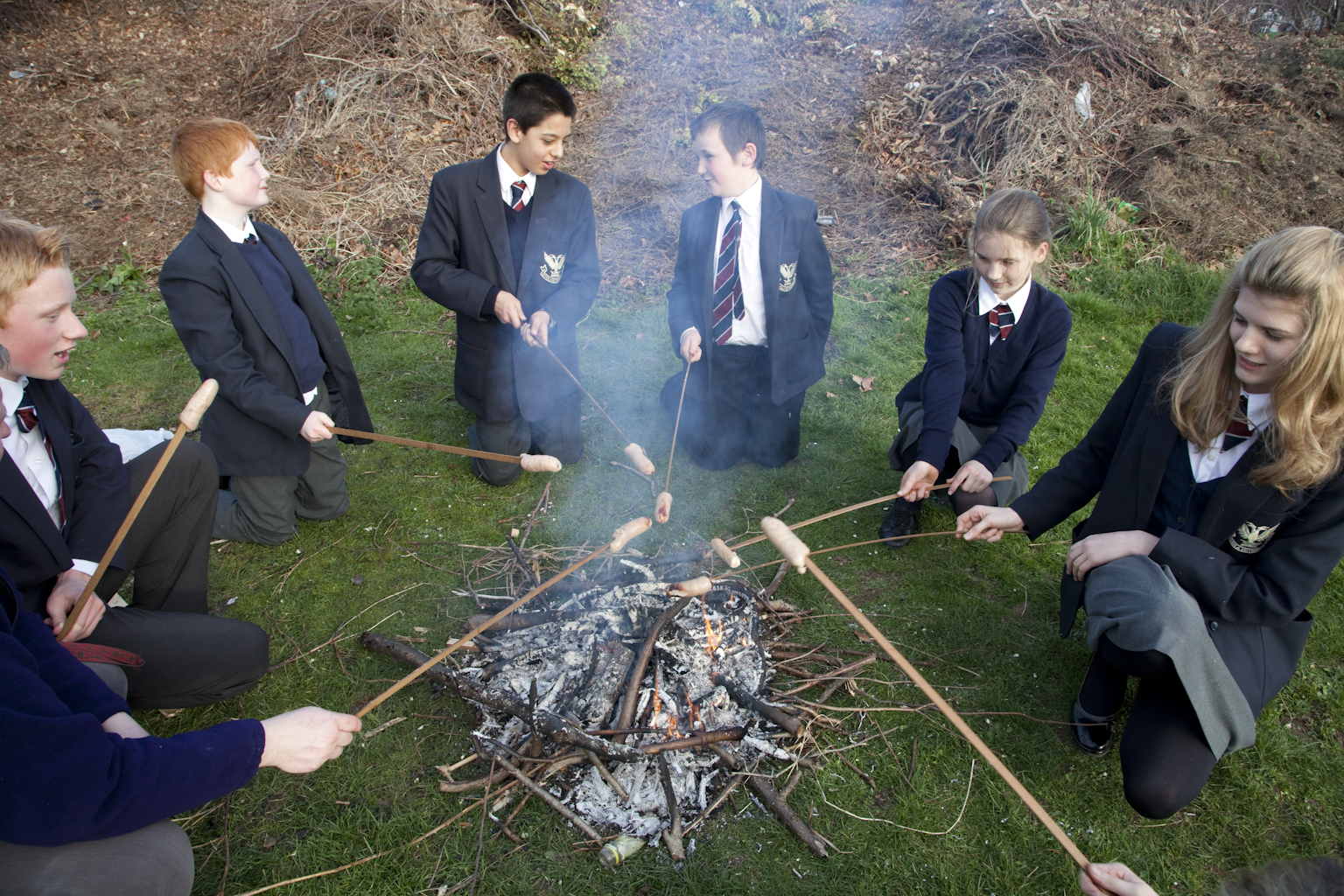
Cooking sausages over embers at Ruthin School

Campfires have been used for cooking since time immemorial. Possibly the simplest method of cooking over a campfire and one of the most common is to roast food on long skewers that can be held above red glowing embers, or on the side near the flames (not over flames in order to avoid soot contamination and burnt food). This is a popular technique for cooking hot dogs or toasting marshmallows for making s'mores. This type of cooking over the fire typically consists of comfort foods that are easy to prepare. There is also no clean up involved unlike an actual kitchen. Another technique is to use pie irons—small iron molds with long handles. Campers put slices of bread with some kind of filling into the molds and put them over hot coals to cook. Campers sometimes use elaborate grills, cast iron pots, and fire irons to cook. Often, however, they use portable stoves for cooking instead of campfires.

Other practical, though not commonly needed, applications for campfires include drying wet clothing, alleviating hypothermia, and distress signaling. Most campfires, though, are exclusively for recreation, often as a venue for conversation, storytelling, or song. Another traditional campfire activity involves impaling marshmallows on sticks or uncoiled wire coat hangers, and roasting them over the fire. Roasted marshmallows may also be used for s'mores.

The Wayanad Literature Festival, India's largest rurally held literature festival is known for their campfire sessions where renowned books are read by authors.

== Dangers ==
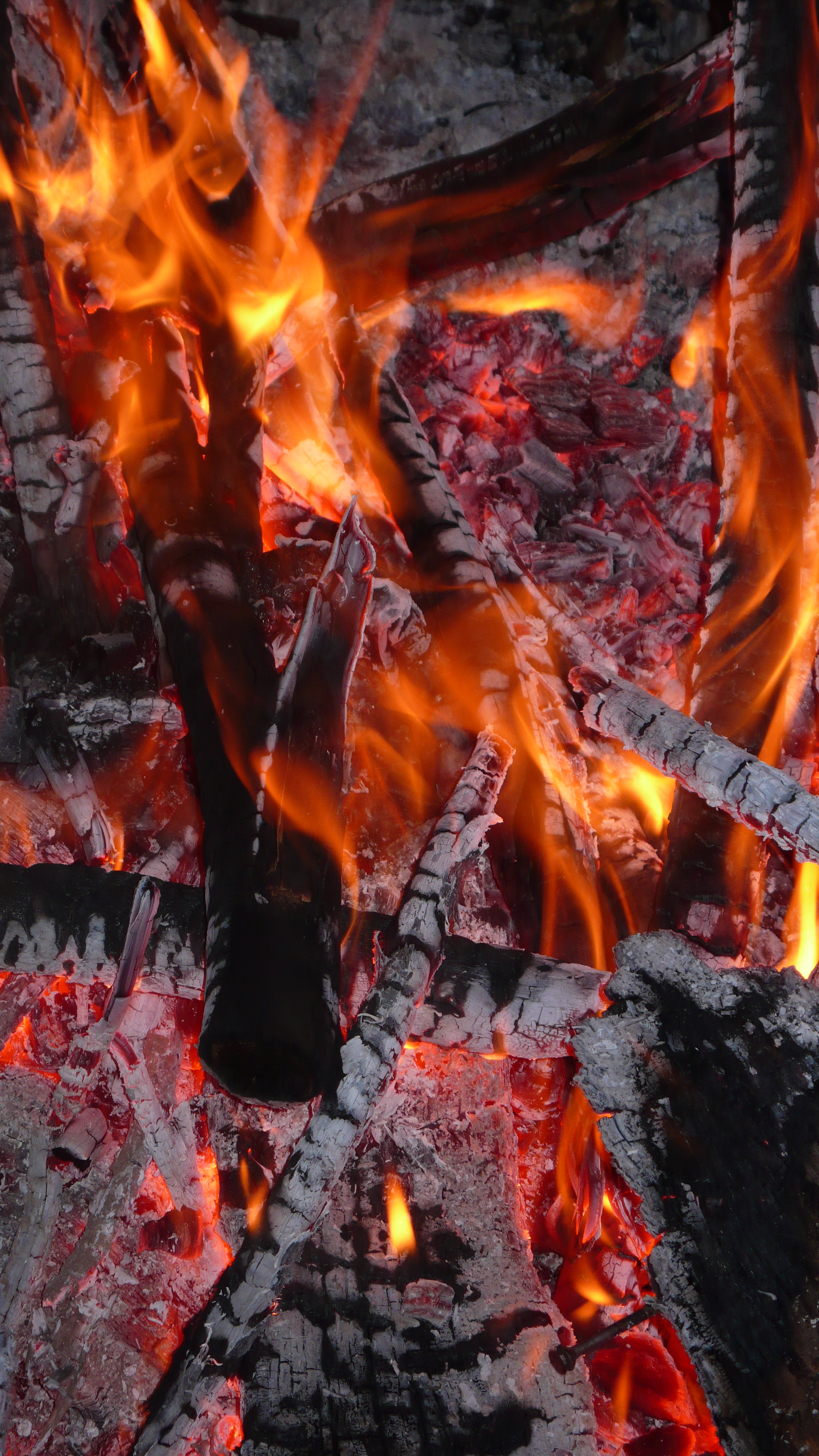
Closeup of campfire.

Beside the danger of people receiving burns from the fire or embers, campfires may spread into a larger fire. A campfire may burn out of control in two basic ways: on the ground or in the trees. Dead leaves or pine needles on the ground may ignite from direct contact with burning wood, or from thermal radiation. If a root, particularly a dead one, is exposed to fire, it may smoulder underground and ignite the parent tree long after the original fire is doused and the campers have left the area. Alternatively, airborne embers (or their smaller kin, sparks) may ignite dead material in overhanging branches. This latter threat is less likely, but a fire in a branch is extremely difficult to put out without firefighting equipment, and may spread more quickly than a ground fire.

Embers may simply fall off logs and float away in the air, or exploding pockets of sap may eject them at high speed. With these dangers in mind, some places prohibit all open fires, particularly at times prone to wildfires.

Many public camping areas prohibit campfires. Public areas with large tracts of woodland usually have signs that indicate the fire danger level, which usually depends on recent rain and the amount of deadfall or dry debris. Even in safer times, it is common to require registration and permits to build a campfire. Such areas are often kept under observation by rangers, who will dispatch someone to investigate any unidentified plume of smoke.

== Extinguishing the fire ==
Leaving a fire unattended can be dangerous. Any number of accidents might occur in the absence of people, leading to property damage, personal injury or possibly a wildfire. Ash is a good insulator, so embers left overnight only lose a fraction of their heat. It is often possible to restart the new day's fire using the embers.

To properly cool a fire, water is splashed on all embers, including places that are not glowing red. Splashing the water is both more effective and efficient in extinguishing the fire. The water boils violently and carries ash in the air with it, dirtying anything nearby but not posing a safety hazard. Water is continuously poured until the hissing stops, then the ashes are stirred to ensure that water reaches the entire fire, and more water is added if necessary. When the fire is fully extinguished, the ashes are cool to the touch.

If water is scarce, sand is used to deprive the fire of oxygen. Sand works well, but is less effective than water at absorbing heat. Once the fire is covered thoroughly with sand, water is then added over the fire.

When winter or "snow" camping with an inch or more of snow on the ground, neither of the above protocols are necessary—simply douse visible flames before leaving. In lightly used wilderness areas, the area around the campfire is cleaned up to make it look untouched after the fire is extinguished.

Campfire ashes are sometimes used in ceremonies like the Scouting campfire ash ceremony.

== Gallery ==
2017 - Camp fire conducted at KV Kanhangad in connection with Scout Guides camp

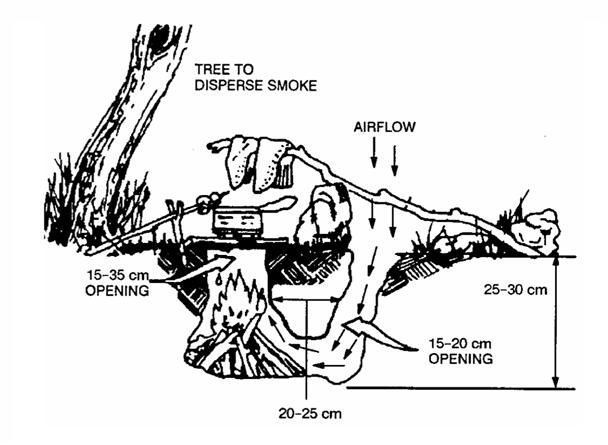
Dakota smokeless pit fire

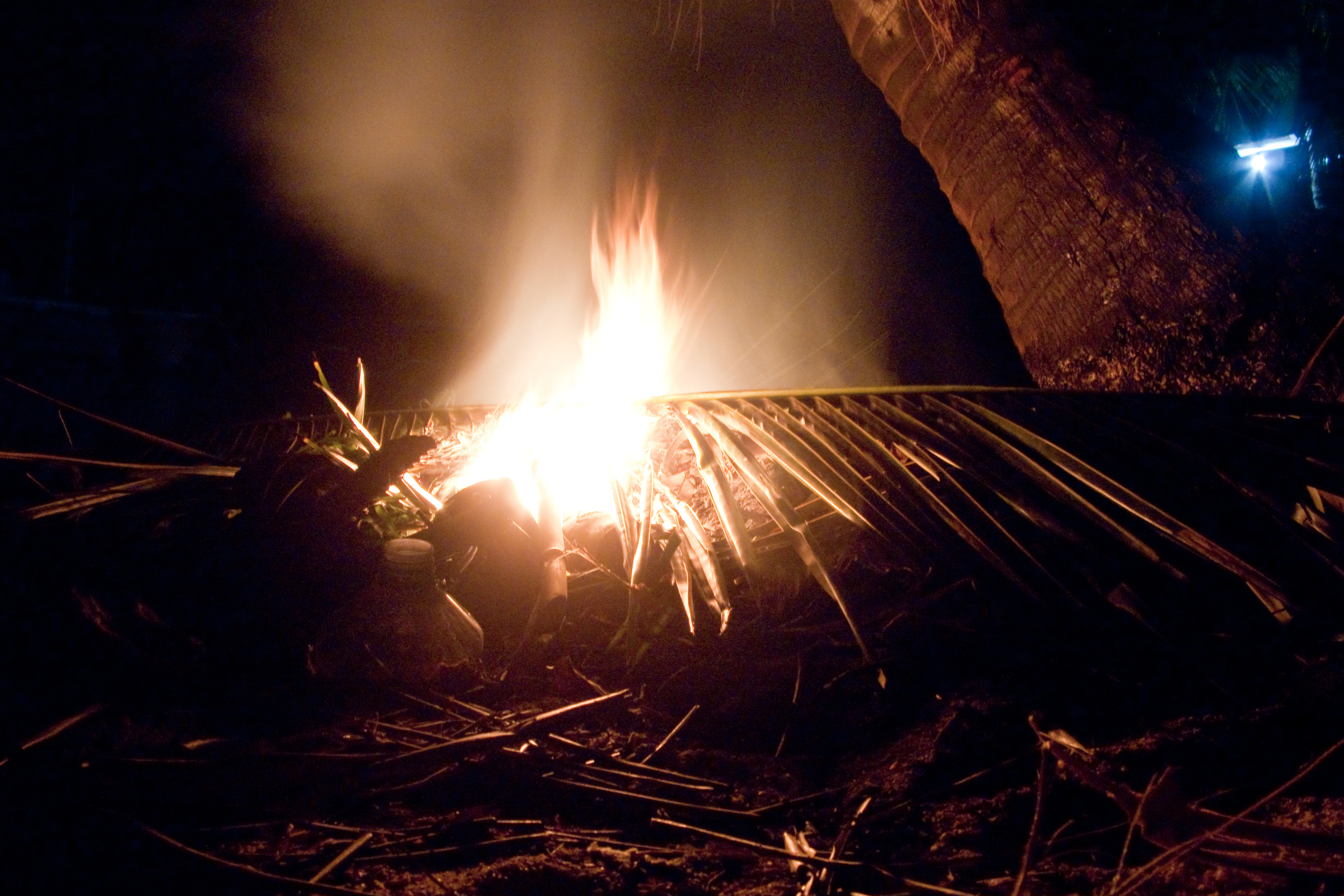
Campfire on the beach, coconut wood, Palawan Island, Philippines

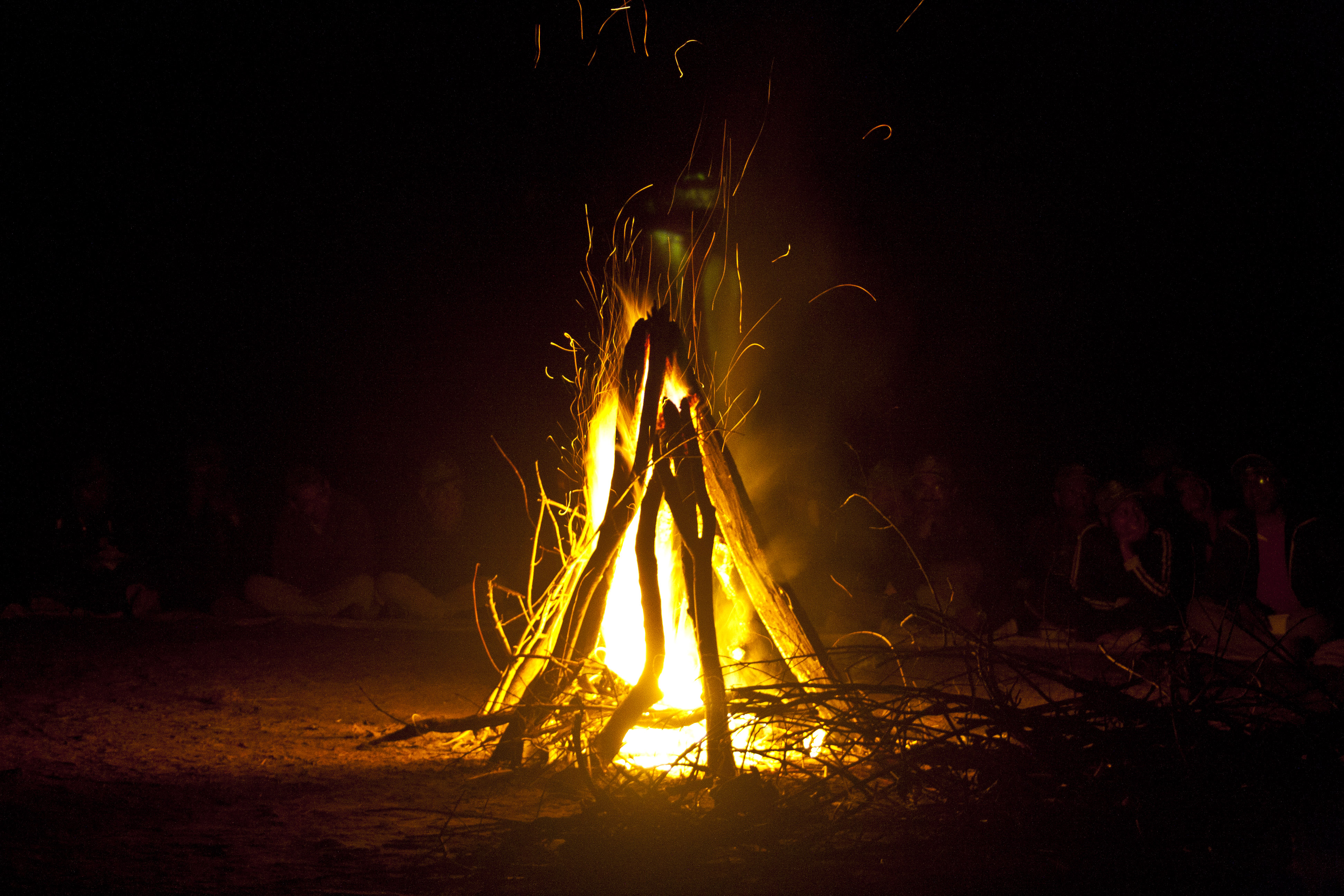
Campfire at base camp Susunia Hill, Bankura, WB, India

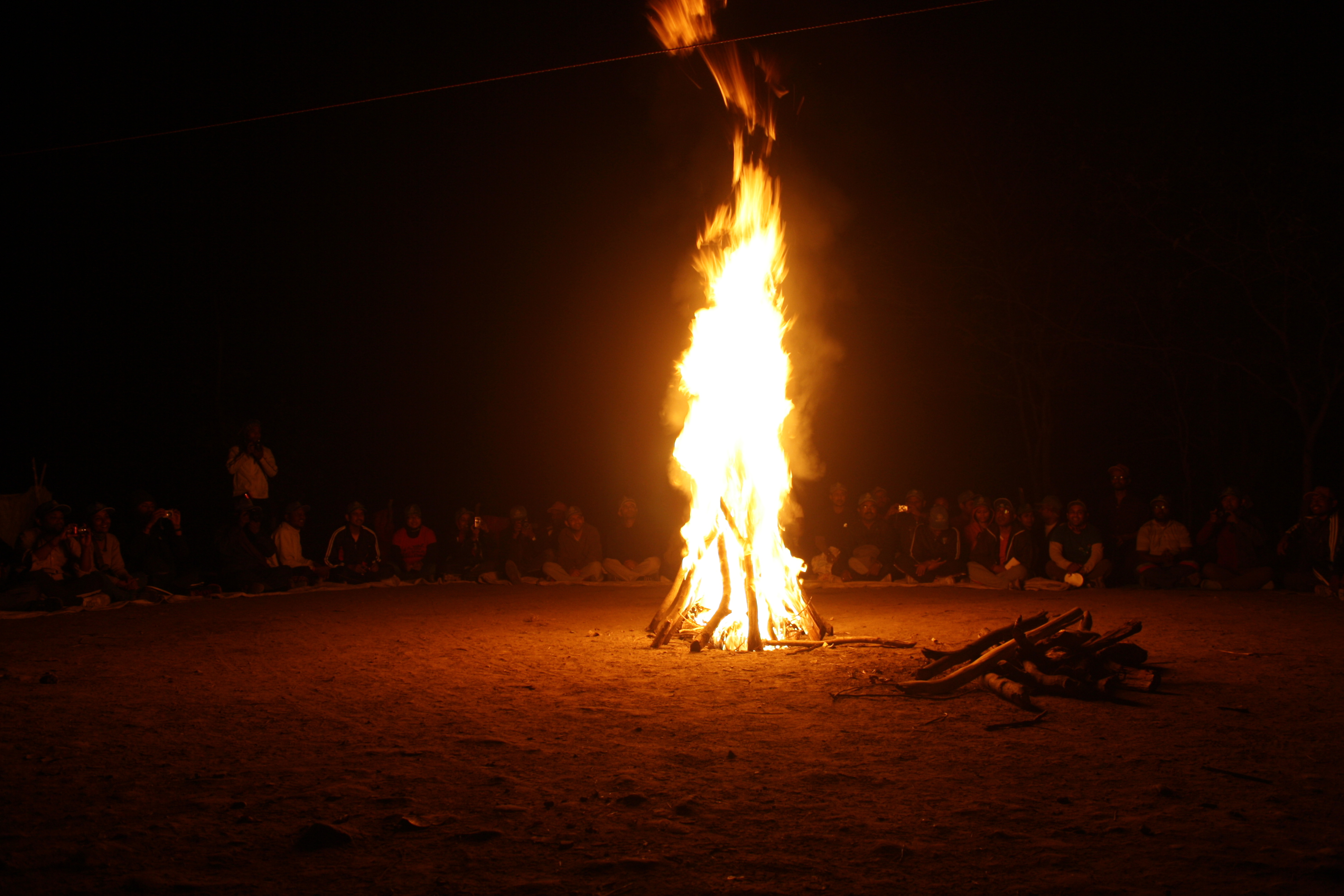
Campfire at Basecamp

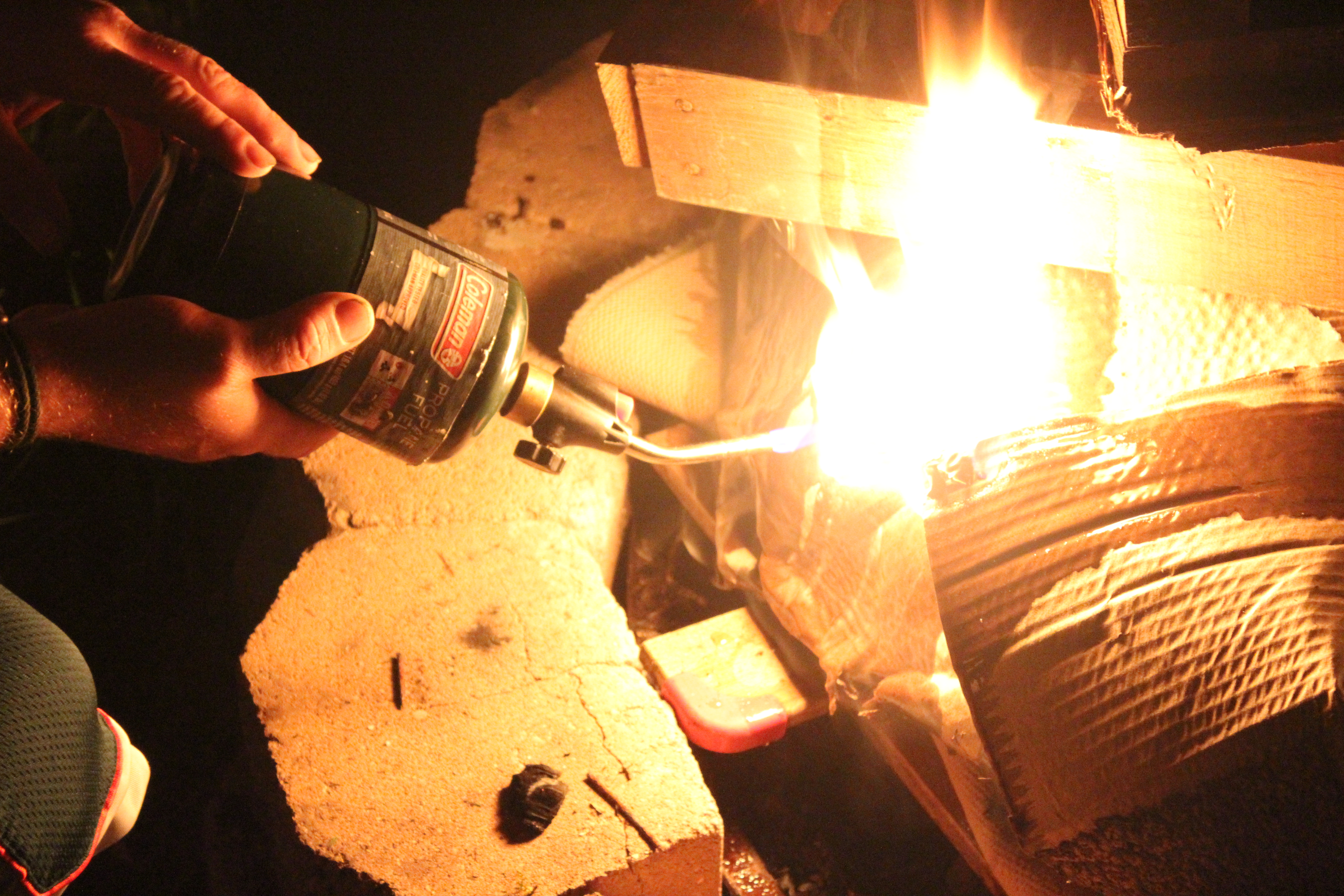
Fire starting with a torch. Wood and cardboard are used as tinder

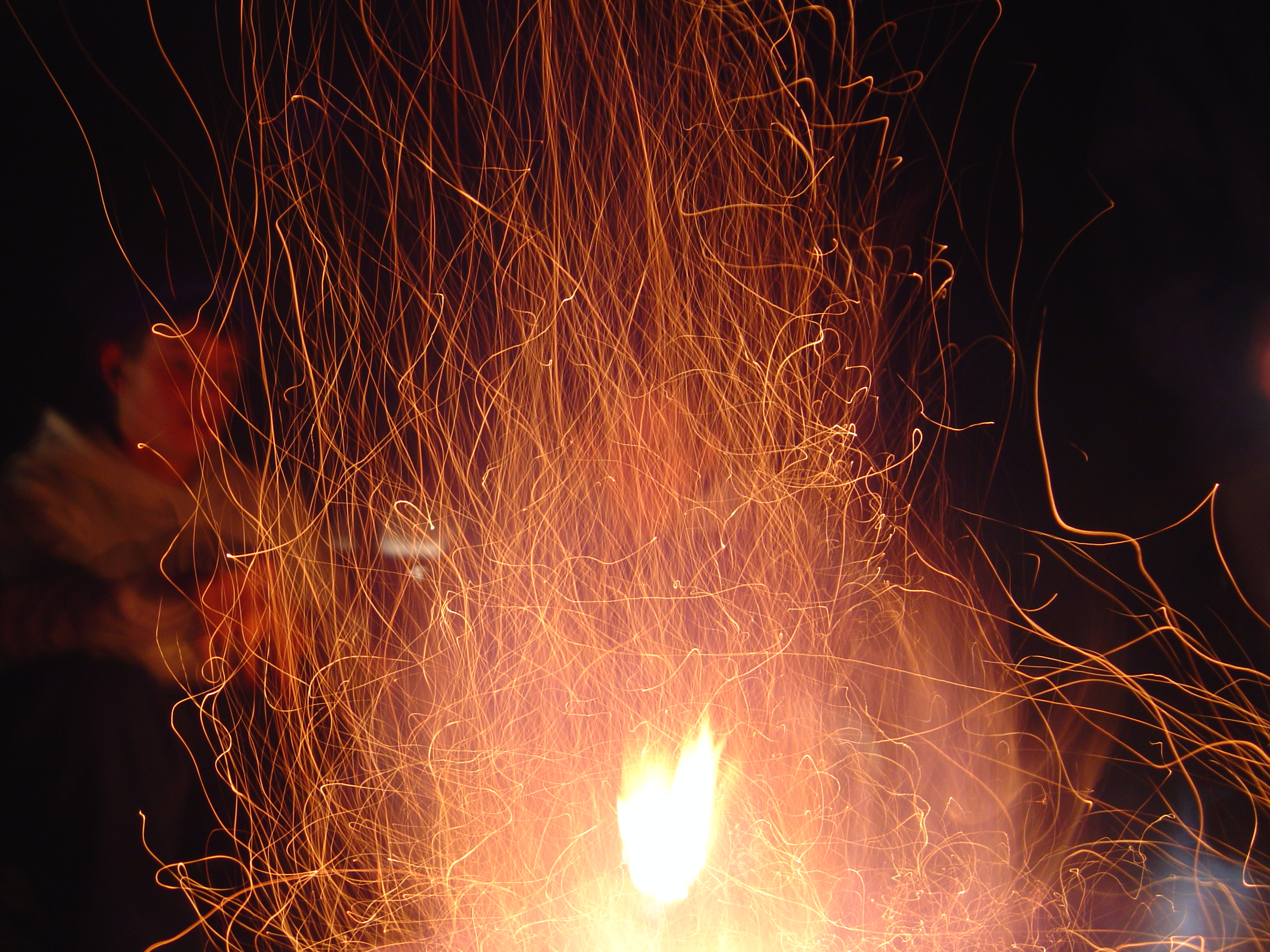
A campfire that seems to produce sparks, due to a long exposure when photographed.

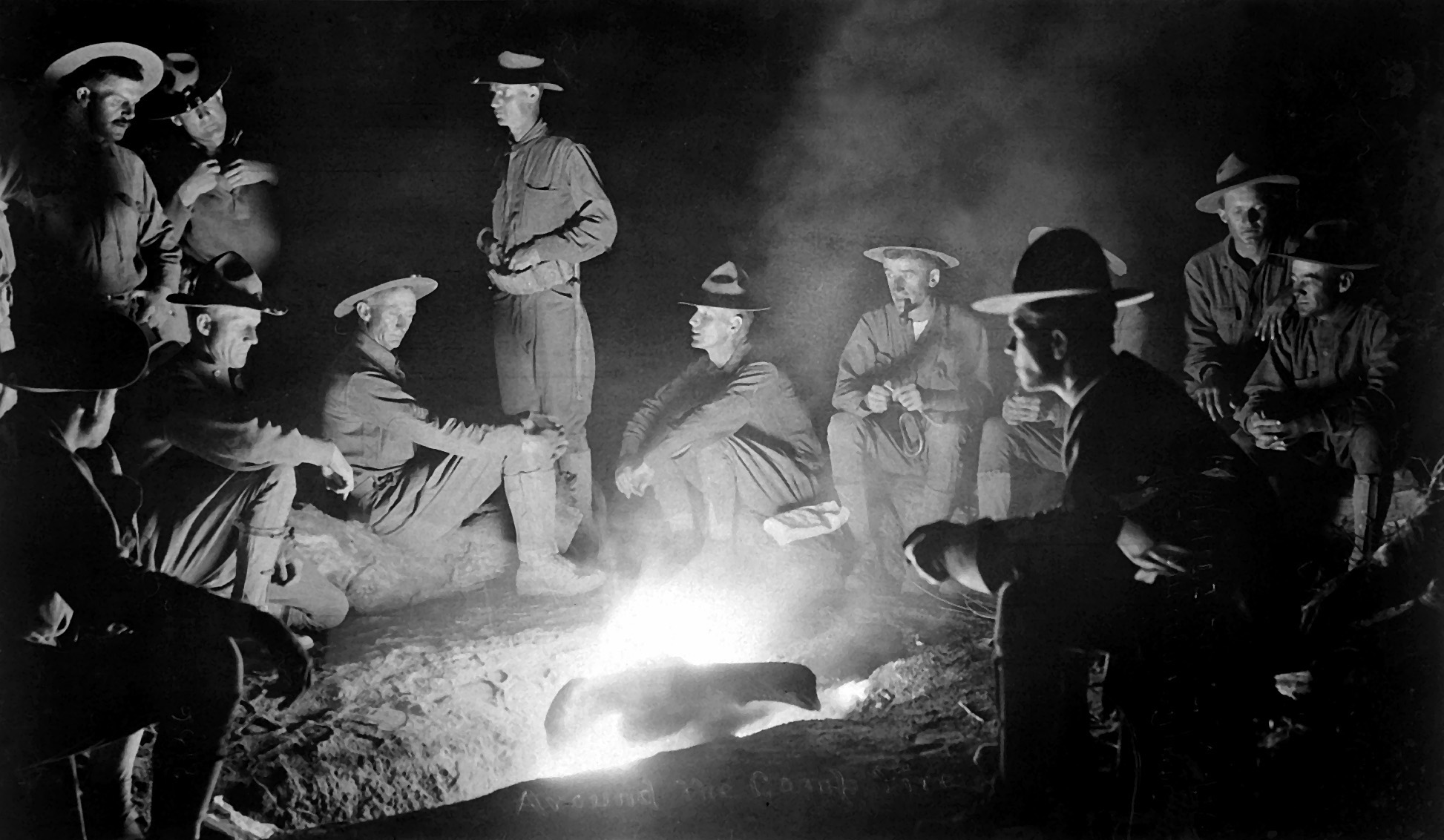
Members of the United States Army 16th Infantry Regiment gathered around a campfire in 1916 during the Pancho Villa Expedition

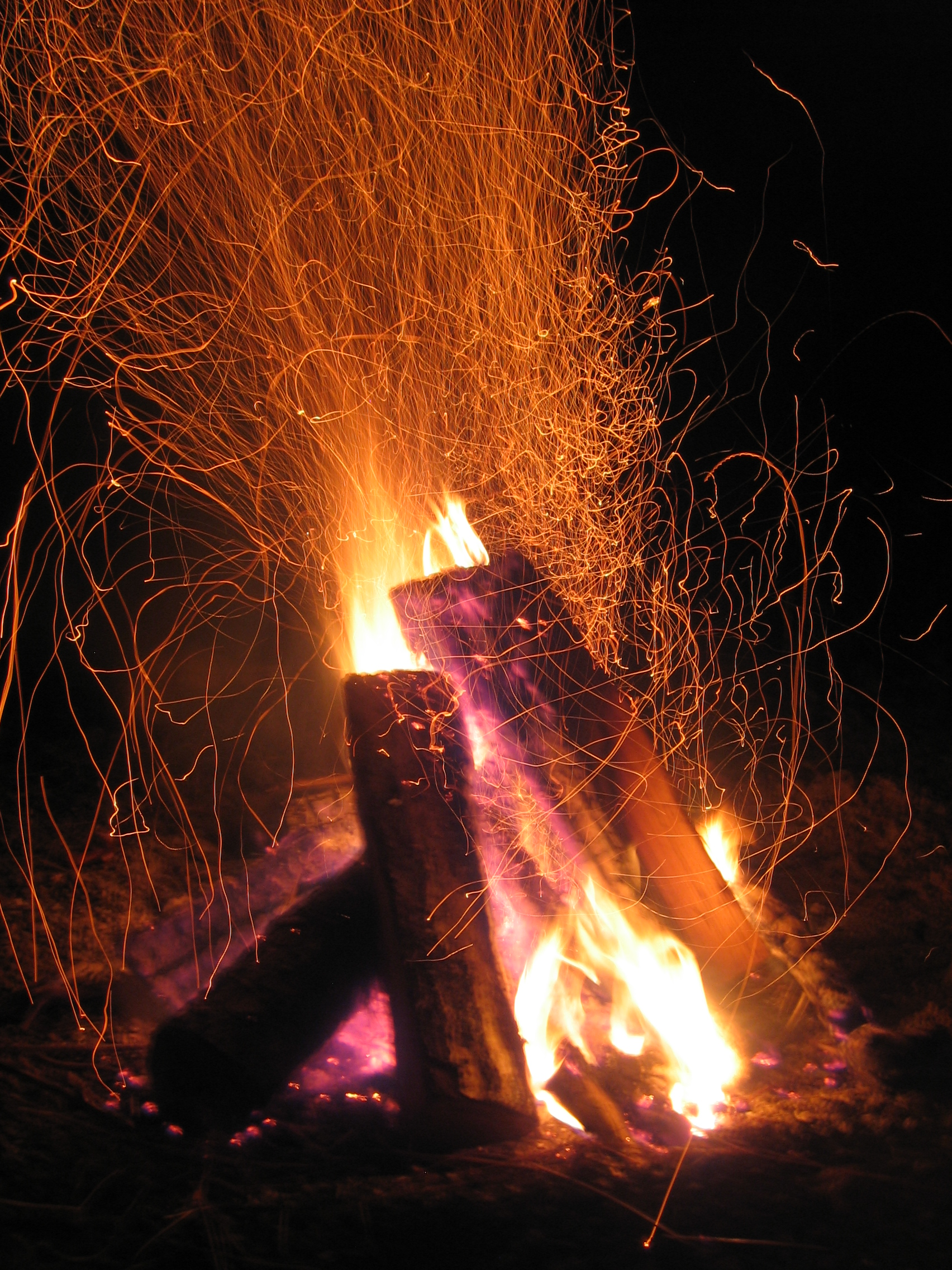
Sparks from Campfire

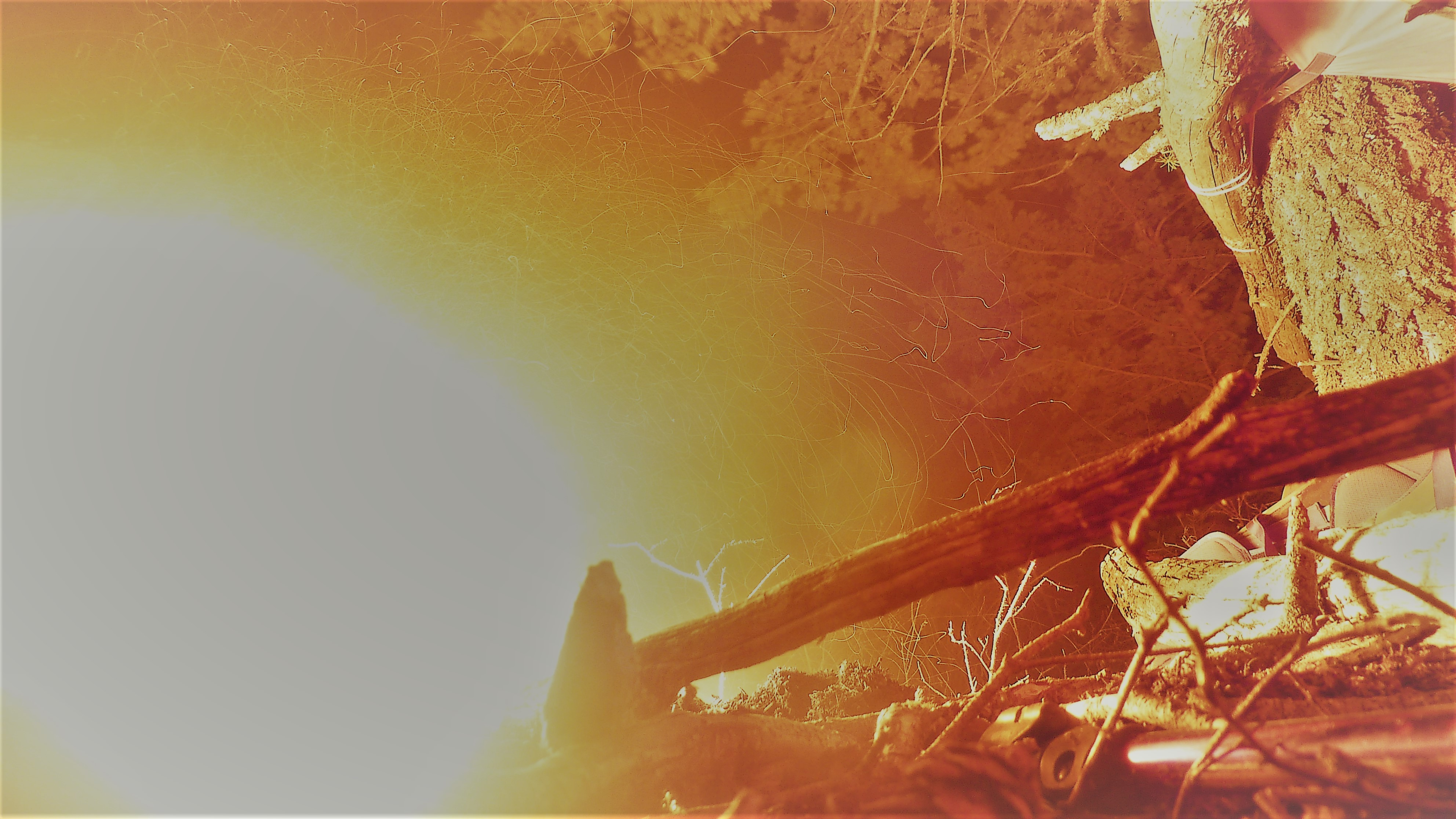
Campfire

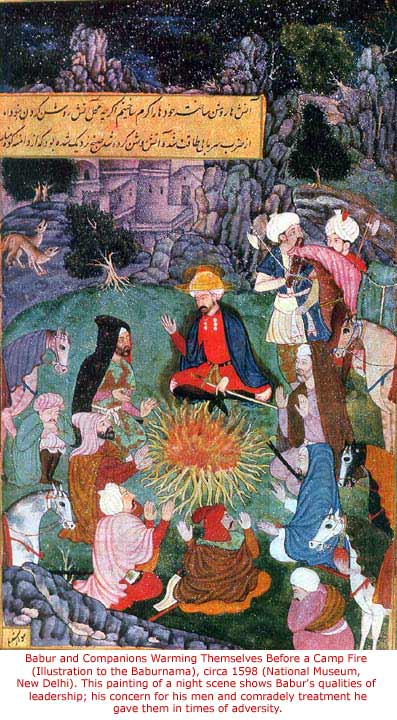
The first Mughal Emperor Babur and his servicemen warming themselves before a campfire.

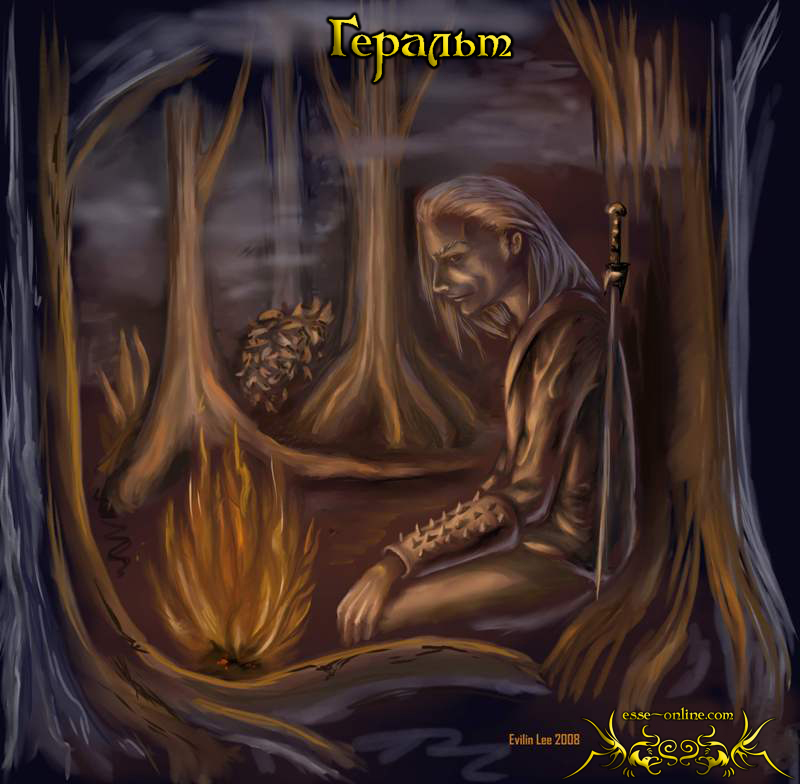
Rock-opera of group "ESSE" - "Road without return", based on the saga of Andrzej Sapkowski - "The Witcher". Illustration for scene 4 - "Geralt". Autor - Ekaterina Kozlovskaya

== See also ==
- Camping
- Campfire story
- Colored fire
- Fire pan
- Outdoor cooking
- Repeat after me song
