= Tread Lightly! =

Non-profit organization in the USA

- Type: Nonprofit Organization
- Industry: Outdoor
- Founded: Launched in 1985 as a public awareness program Became Nonprofit in 1990
- Founder: US Forest Service
- Headquarters: Salt Lake City, Utah, United States
- Key people: Matt Caldwell, Executive Director; Danielle Fowles, Assistant Director; Evan Robins, Stewardship Manager; Jerrica Archibald, Communications Manager
- Revenue: 1,217,396 United States dollar (2017)
- Total assets: 1,548,846 United States dollar (2022)
- Website: www.treadlightly.org

Tread Lightly! is a nonprofit organization based in Centerville, Utah, whose mission is to promote responsible recreation through stewardship, education and communication. It was started as a campaign to address impacts from off road vehicles by the United States Forest Service in 1985, and became a nonprofit in 1990.

== Background ==
Tread Lightly and its partners lead a national initiative to protect and enhance recreation access and opportunities by promoting outdoor ethics to heighten individuals’ sense of good stewardship. The organization's goal is to balance the needs of people who enjoy outdoor recreation with the need to maintain a healthy environment through minimum impact education and on-the-ground public land stewardship.

Tread Lightly's core ethic revolves around five tenets of responsible recreation, called the T.R.E.A.D. Principles:

- Travel Responsibly
- Respect the Rights of Others
- Educate Yourself
- Avoid Sensitive Areas
- Do Your Part

== See also ==
- Ecology movement
- Environmental protection
- Habitat conservation
- Leave No Trace
- Trail ethics
