= List of moths of Australia (Thyrididae) =

Partial list of Australian moths

This is a list of the Australian moth species of the family Thyrididae. It also acts as an index to the species articles and forms part of the full List of moths of Australia.

== Subfamily Siculodinae ==
=== Rhodoneurini ===
- Addaea aneranna Turner, 1915
- Addaea fragilis Warren, 1899
- Addaea fulva Warren, 1907
- Addaea polyphoralis (Walker, 1866)
- Addaea pusilla (Butler, 1887)
- Addaea subtessellata Walker, 1866
- Kanshizeia hemicycla (Meyrick, 1886)
- Mellea ordinaria (Warren, 1896)
- Oxycophina theorina (Meyrick, 1887)
- Rhodoneura aurata (Butler, 1882)

=== Siculodini ===
- Abrotesia griphodes Turner, 1915
- Calindoea atripunctalis (Walker, 1866)
- Calindoea dorilusalis (Walker, 1859)
- Calindoea polygraphalis (Walker, 1866)
- Collinsa cuprea (Pagenstecher, 1884)
- Collinsa submicans (Warren, 1908)
- Hypolamprus bastialis (Walker, 1859)
- Hypolamprus crossosticha (Turner, 1911)
- Hypolamprus hypostilpna (Turner, 1941)
- Hypolamprus melilialis (Swinhoe, 1900)
- Hypolamprus reticulata (Butler, 1886)
- Hypolamprus sciodes Turner, 1911
- Hypolamprus semiusta Warren, 1908
- Hypolamprus ypsilon (Warren, 1899)
- Microbelia giulia (Swinhoe, 1902)
- Microbelia molybditis (Turner, 1915)
- Novobelura dohertyi (Warren, 1897)
- Pharambara micacealis Walker, 1866
- Pharambara splendida Butler, 1887
- Picrostomastis marginepunctalis (Leech, 1889)
- Picrostomastis subrosealis (Leech, 1889)

== Subfamily Striglininae ==
- Aglaopus carycina (Turner, 1915)
- Aglaopus centiginosa (T.P. Lucas, 1898)
- Aglaopus ferruginea (Whalley, 1976)
- Aglaopus floccosa (Warren, 1905)
- Aglaopus gemmulosa (Whalley, 1976)
- Aglaopus innotata (Warren, 1904)
- Aglaopus irias (Meyrick, 1887)
- Aglaopus loxomita (Turner, 1906)
- Aglaopus parata (Whalley, 1976)
- Aglaopus pyrrhata (Walker, 1866)
- Aglaopus stramentaria (T.P. Lucas, 1898)
- Banisia fenestrifera Walker, 1863
- Banisia lobata (Moore, 1882)
- Banisia myrsusalis (Walker, 1859)
- Banisia placida Whalley, 1976
- Canaea hyalospila (Lower, 1894)
- Canaea semitessellalis (Walker, 1866)
- Mathoris loceusalis (Walker, 1859)
- Striglina asinina Warren, 1899
- Striglina buergersi Gaede, 1922
- Striglina cinnamomea (Rothschild, 1915)
- Striglina meridiana Whalley, 1976
- Striglina navigatorum (R. Felder & Rogenhofer, 1873)
- Striglina scitaria (Walker, 1862)
