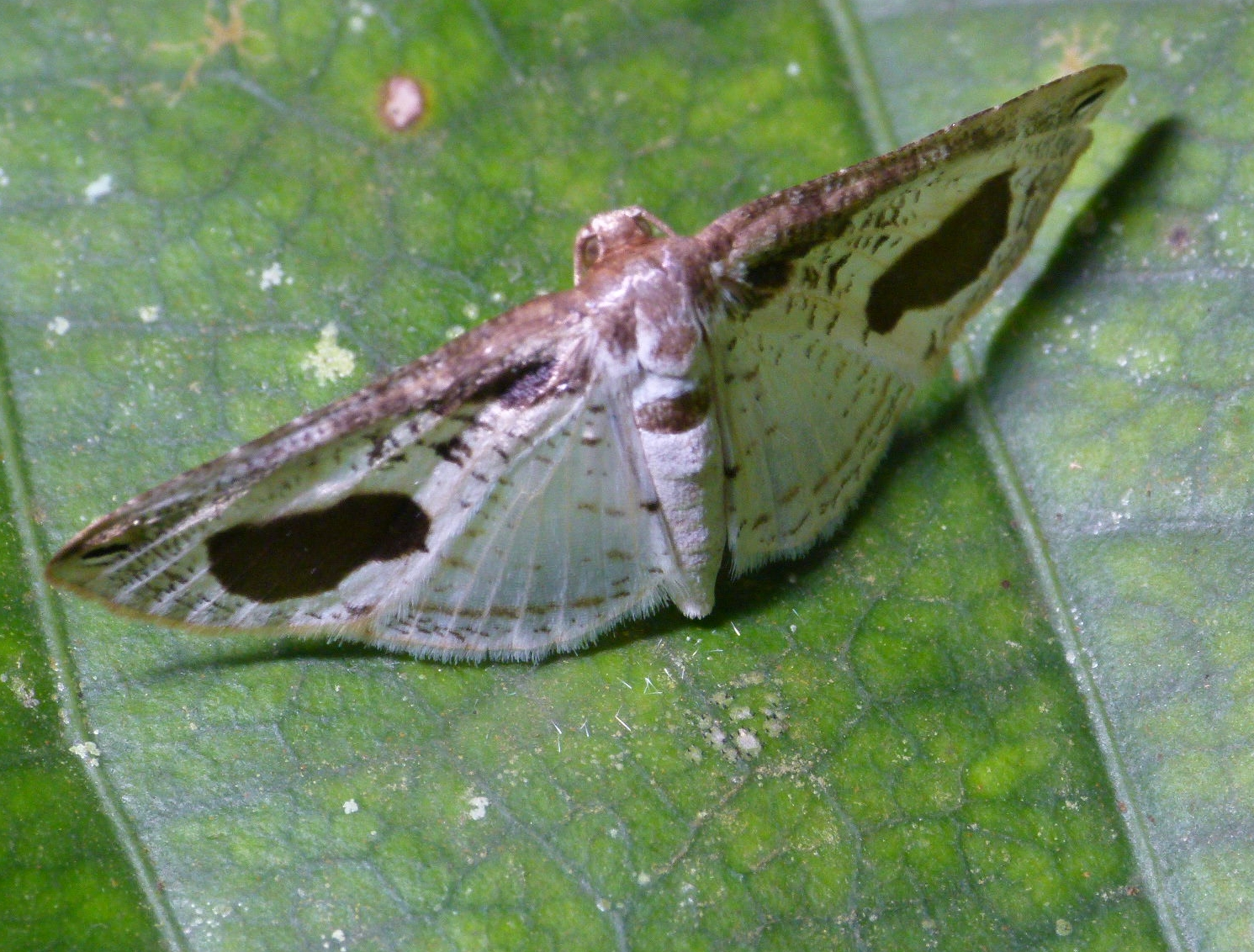

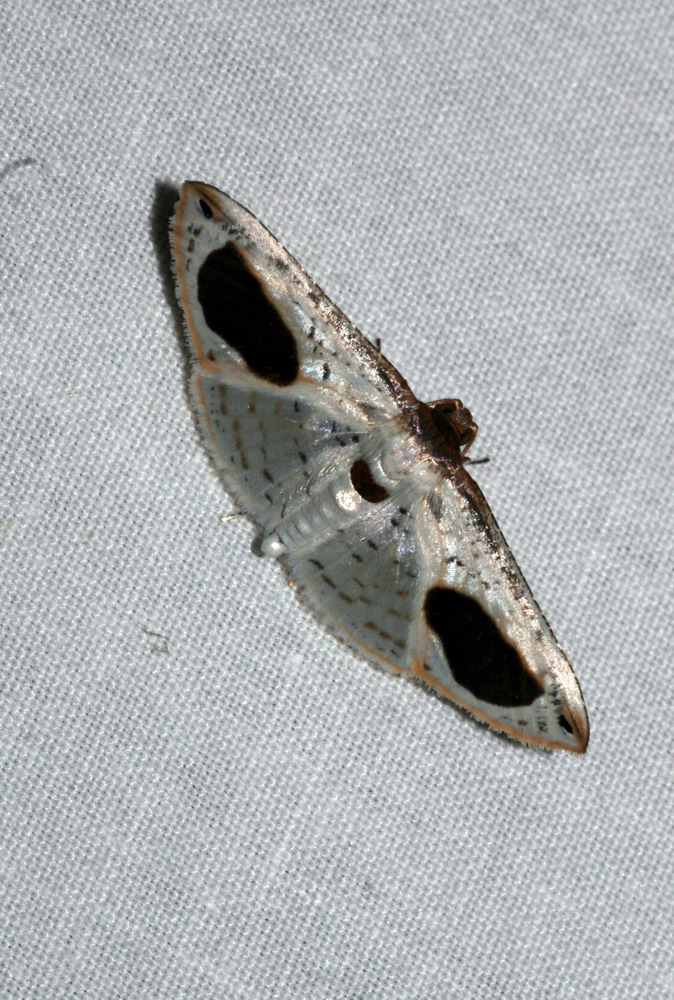

Scientific classification
- Kingdom: Animalia
- Phylum: Arthropoda
- Class: Insecta
- Order: Lepidoptera
- Family: Thyrididae
- Genus: Calindoea
- Species: C. argentalis

Binomial name
- Calindoea argentalis Walker, [1866] 1865

Synonyms
- Siculodes tuberosalis Warren, 1896

= Calindoea argentalis =

Species of moth

Calindoea argentalis is a moth of the family Thyrididae first described by Francis Walker in 1865. It is found in India, Sri Lanka, Java and Borneo.

Host plant is Syzygium jambos.
