= Hapana milloti =

Scientific classification
- Kingdom: Animalia
- Phylum: Arthropoda
- Class: Insecta
- Order: Lepidoptera
- Family: Thyrididae
- Genus: Hapana
- Species: H. milloti

Binomial name
- Hapana milloti (Viette, 1954)

Synonyms
- Betouse miloti Viette, 1954

Species of moth

Hapana milloti is a species of moth of the family Thyrididae. It is found in Madagascar.

They have a wing length between 7.5 and 9.5 mm. Externally this species is very similar to Hapana verticalis: the main difference of this species is that it is lacking the tarsal spines.
