= Nemea betousalis =

Scientific classification
- Domain: Eukaryota
- Kingdom: Animalia
- Phylum: Arthropoda
- Class: Insecta
- Order: Lepidoptera
- Family: Thyrididae
- Genus: Nemea
- Species: N. betousalis

Binomial name
- Nemea betousalis (Gaede, 1917)

Synonyms
- Rhodoneura betousalis Gaede 1917; Rhodoneura bryaxis Fawcett, 1918

Species of moth

Nemea betousalis is a species of moth of the family Thyrididae. It is found in Kenya.

The wingspan of this species is 21–25 mm.
