= Hypolamprus lepraota =

Scientific classification
- Kingdom: Animalia
- Phylum: Arthropoda
- Class: Insecta
- Order: Lepidoptera
- Family: Thyrididae
- Genus: Hypolamprus
- Species: H. lepraota

Binomial name
- Hypolamprus lepraota Hampson, 1910

Species of moth

Hypolamprus lepraota is a moth of the family Thyrididae first described by George Hampson in 1910. It is found in Sri Lanka.
