= Hypolamprus striatalis =

Scientific classification
- Kingdom: Animalia
- Phylum: Arthropoda
- Clade: Pancrustacea
- Class: Insecta
- Order: Lepidoptera
- Family: Thyrididae
- Genus: Hypolamprus
- Species: H. striatalis

Binomial name
- Hypolamprus striatalis (C. Swinhoe, 1886)

Synonyms
- Microsca striatalis C. Swinhoe, 1885

Species of moth

Hypolamprus striatalis is a moth of the family Thyrididae first described by Charles Swinhoe in 1886. It is found in Sri Lanka. and India.
