= Hypolamprus subrosealis =

Scientific classification
- Domain: Eukaryota
- Kingdom: Animalia
- Phylum: Arthropoda
- Class: Insecta
- Order: Lepidoptera
- Family: Thyrididae
- Genus: Hypolamprus
- Species: H. subrosealis

Binomial name
- Hypolamprus subrosealis Leech, 1889

Synonyms
- Betousa penestica West, 1932

Species of moth

Hypolamprus subrosealis is a moth of the family Thyrididae first described by John Henry Leech in 1889. It is found in Sri Lanka.
