= Chrysotypus dawsoni =

Scientific classification
- Kingdom: Animalia
- Phylum: Arthropoda
- Class: Insecta
- Order: Lepidoptera
- Family: Thyrididae
- Genus: Chrysotypus
- Species: C. dawsoni

Binomial name
- Chrysotypus dawsoni Distant, 1897

Synonyms
- Proterozeuxis acuatalis Gaede, 1917; Proterozeuxis ansorgei Warren, 1899; Proterozeuxis brunnea Warren, 1908; Chrysotypus pectinifer (Hampson, 1906)

Species of moth

Chrysotypus dawsoni is a species of moth of the family Thyrididae.

It is found in Togo, Cameroon, Sierra Leone, Uganda, Tanzania and South Africa.

The body of this species is red brown, and the underside of the thorax is whitish. The wings are yellow brown with irregular dark brown lines with a wingspan of 34–48 mm.
