= Sijua meriani =

Scientific classification
- Domain: Eukaryota
- Kingdom: Animalia
- Phylum: Arthropoda
- Class: Insecta
- Order: Lepidoptera
- Family: Thyrididae
- Genus: Sijua
- Species: S. meriani

Binomial name
- Sijua meriani (Gaede, 1917)

Synonyms
- Rhodoneura meriani Gaede 1917

Species of moth

Sijua meriani is a species of moth of the family Thyrididae. It is found in the Seychelles.

The head and thorax of this species are brown violet, the wings grey violet with brown transversal lines. The wingspan of this species is 16 mm.
