= Toosa batesi =

Scientific classification
- Kingdom: Animalia
- Phylum: Arthropoda
- Class: Insecta
- Order: Lepidoptera
- Family: Thyrididae
- Genus: Toosa
- Species: T. batesi

Binomial name
- Toosa batesi Bethune-Baker, 1927

Species of moth

Toosa batesi is a moth in the family Thyrididae. It was described by George Thomas Bethune-Baker in 1927. It is found in Cameroon.

The wingspan is about 40 mm. Both wings are dark lustrous metallic green without any markings.
