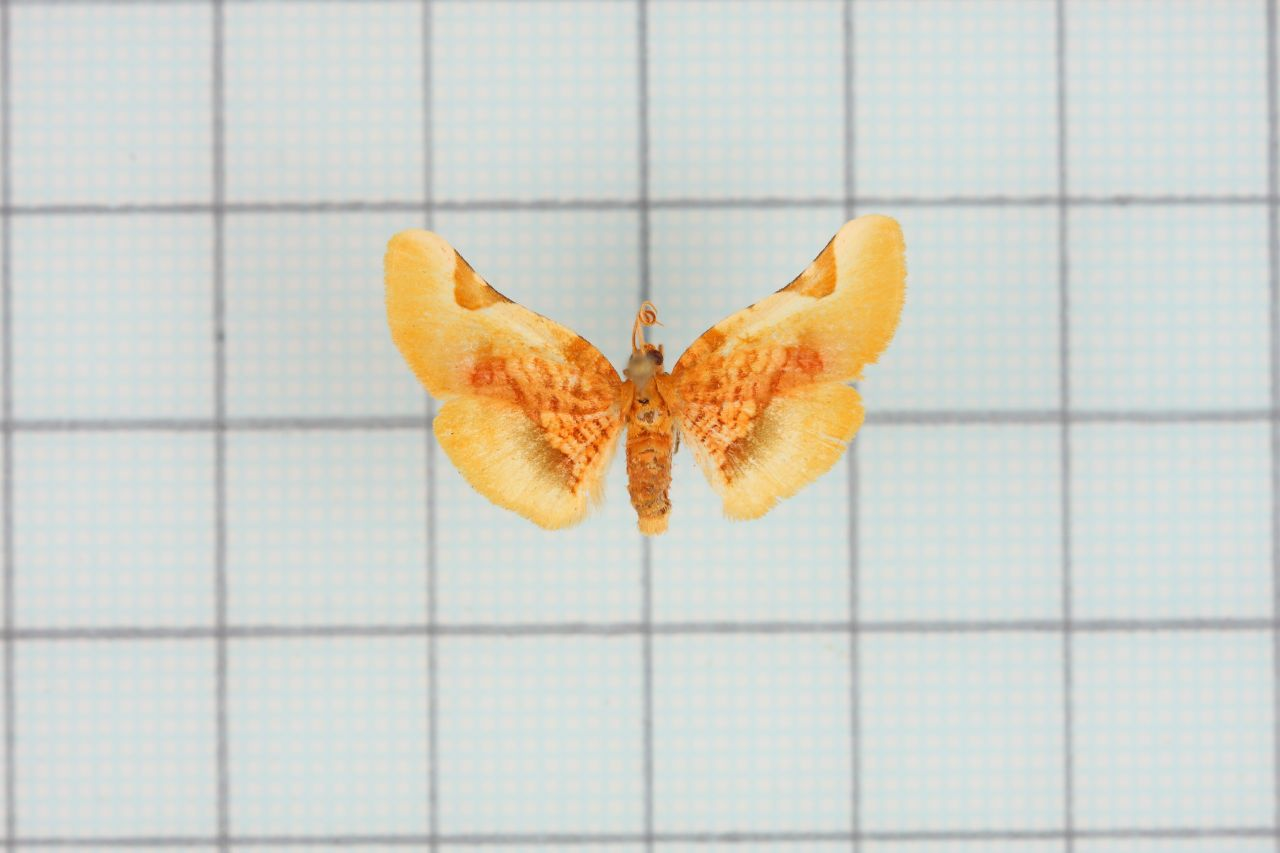

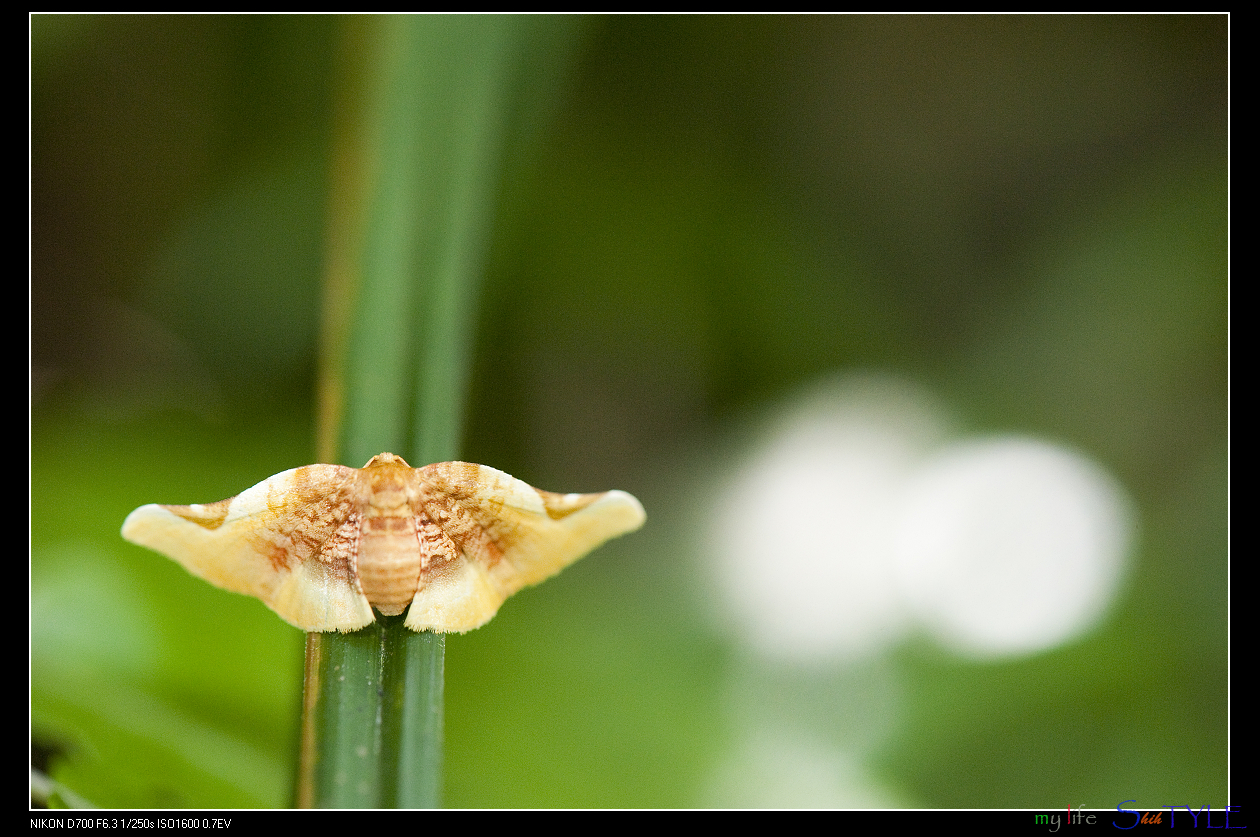

Scientific classification
- Domain: Eukaryota
- Kingdom: Animalia
- Phylum: Arthropoda
- Class: Insecta
- Order: Lepidoptera
- Family: Thyrididae
- Genus: Pyrinioides
- Species: P. sinuosus

Binomial name
- Pyrinioides sinuosus (Warren, 1896)

Synonyms
- Camptochilus sinuosa Warren, 1896; Pyralioides sinuosa Warren, 1896; Camptochilus sinuosa; Rhodoneura excavata Gaede, 1917

= Pyrinioides sinuosus =

Species of moth

Pyrinioides sinuosus is a species of moth of the family Thyrididae. It is found in Taiwan, Japan, Burma and India.

This species is sometimes called Pyrinioides sinuosa.
