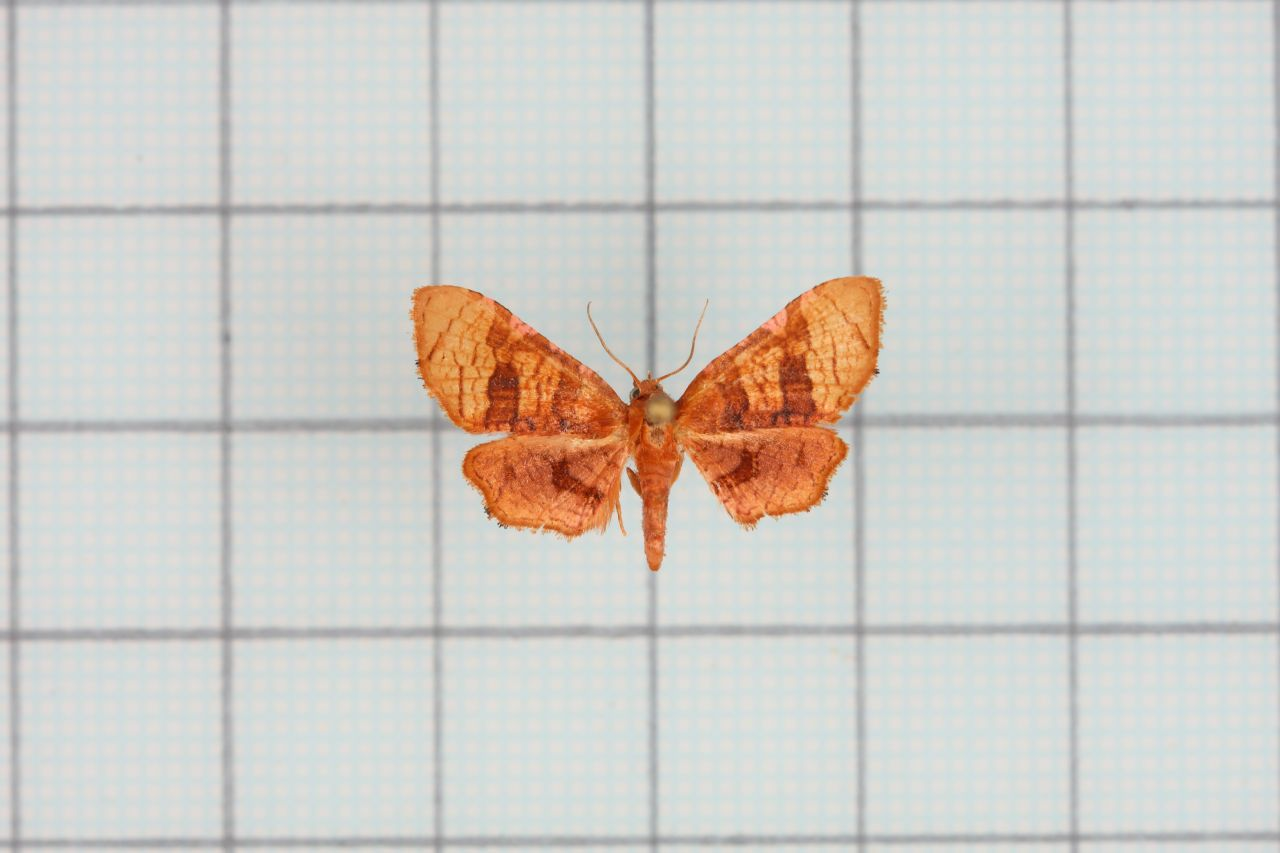

Scientific classification
- Domain: Eukaryota
- Kingdom: Animalia
- Phylum: Arthropoda
- Class: Insecta
- Order: Lepidoptera
- Family: Thyrididae
- Genus: Hypolamprus
- Species: H. emblicalis

Binomial name
- Hypolamprus emblicalis Moore, 1888

= Hypolamprus emblicalis =

Species of moth

Hypolamprus emblicalis is a species of moth of the family Thyrididae. It is found in India and Taiwan.

The wingspan is 16–18 mm (0.63–0.71 in).
