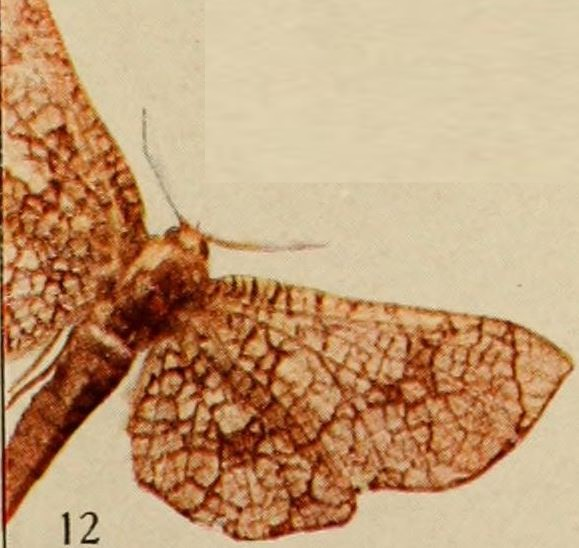

Scientific classification
- Kingdom: Animalia
- Phylum: Arthropoda
- Class: Insecta
- Order: Lepidoptera
- Family: Thyrididae
- Genus: Chrysotypus
- Species: C. medjensis

Binomial name
- Chrysotypus medjensis (Holland, 1920)

Synonyms
- Proterozeuxis medjensis Holland, 1920

= Chrysotypus medjensis =

Species of moth

Chrysotypus medjensis is a species of moth of the family Thyrididae. It is found in the Democratic Republic of the Congo.
