= Hypolamprus angulalis =

Scientific classification
- Domain: Eukaryota
- Kingdom: Animalia
- Phylum: Arthropoda
- Class: Insecta
- Order: Lepidoptera
- Family: Thyrididae
- Genus: Hypolamprus
- Species: H. angulalis

Binomial name
- Hypolamprus angulalis Moore, [1888]

Species of moth

Hypolamprus angulalis is a moth of the family Thyrididae first described by Frederic Moore in 1888. It is found in Malaysia, Myanmar and Sri Lanka.
