= Dixoa albatalis =

Scientific classification
- Kingdom: Animalia
- Phylum: Arthropoda
- Clade: Pancrustacea
- Class: Insecta
- Order: Lepidoptera
- Family: Thyrididae
- Genus: Dixoa
- Species: D. albatalis

Binomial name
- Dixoa albatalis (Swinhoe, 1889)

Species of moth

Dixoa albatalis is a moth of the family Thyrididae first described by Swinhoe in 1889. It is found in Sri Lanka and India.
