= Sijua jejunalis =

Scientific classification
- Domain: Eukaryota
- Kingdom: Animalia
- Phylum: Arthropoda
- Class: Insecta
- Order: Lepidoptera
- Family: Thyrididae
- Genus: Sijua
- Species: S. jejunalis

Binomial name
- Sijua jejunalis (Gaede, 1917)

Synonyms
- Rhodoneura jejunalis Gaede 1917

Species of moth

Sijua jejunalis is a species of moth of the family Thyrididae. It is found in the small African nation of Togo.

The wingspan of this species is 19–20 mm.
