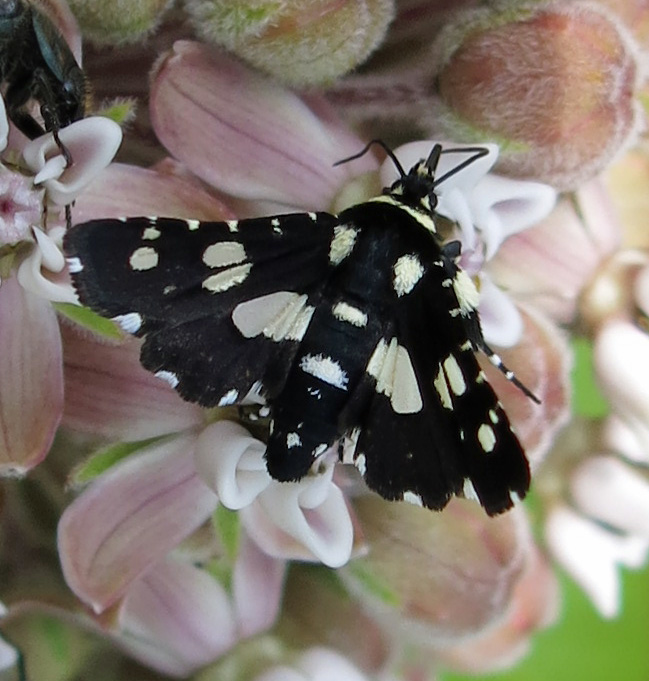

Scientific classification
- Kingdom: Animalia
- Phylum: Arthropoda
- Clade: Pancrustacea
- Class: Insecta
- Order: Lepidoptera
- Family: Thyrididae
- Genus: Pseudothyris
- Species: P. sepulchralis

Binomial name
- Pseudothyris sepulchralis (Guérin-Méneville, 1832)

Synonyms
- Thyris sepulchralis Guérin-Méneville, 1832; Thyris lugubris Boisduval, 1852; Dysodia margaritana Clemens, 1862

= Pseudothyris sepulchralis =

Mournful Thyris Moth

Species of moth

Pseudothyris sepulchralis, the mournful thyris, is a species of day-flying moth in the family Thyrididae and can be found throughout North America. They have a flight duration of 2–3 weeks. The adults are rarely found on flowering plants for feeding.

== Description ==
The larva is about 18 millimetres (0.71 in) in length. As an adult, its wingspan is around 15–23 millimetres (0.59–0.91 in) and its body is black with white spots and marks.

The larvae feed on Smilax species.

=== Pupae ===
The larva cuts an almost perfect circle into a leaf, before rolling itself in it, creating a pouch shaped cocoon and hibernating in it until the following year.
