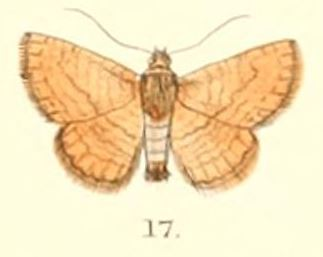

Scientific classification
- Domain: Eukaryota
- Kingdom: Animalia
- Phylum: Arthropoda
- Class: Insecta
- Order: Lepidoptera
- Family: Thyrididae
- Genus: Striglina
- Species: S. strigosa

Binomial name
- Striglina strigosa (Moore, 1882)

Synonyms
- Sonagara strigosa Moore, 1882

= Striglina strigosa =

Species of moth

Striglina strigosa is a species of moth of the family Thyrididae. It is found in India.
