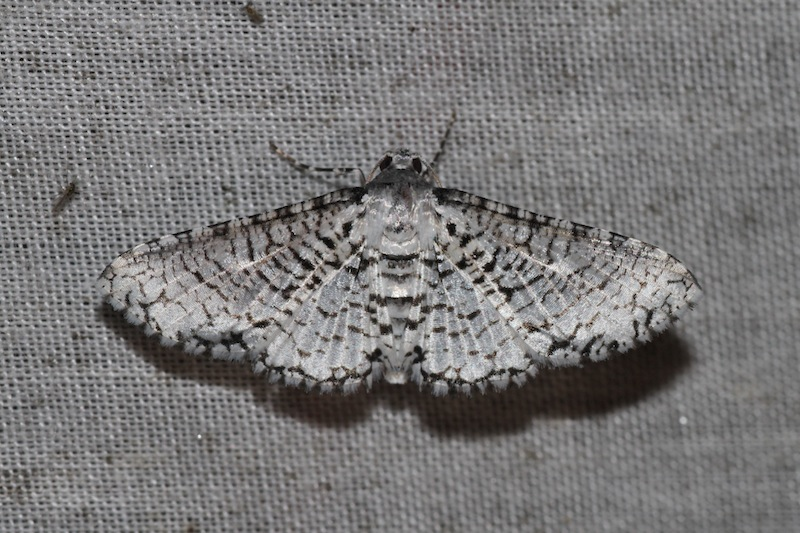

Scientific classification
- Domain: Eukaryota
- Kingdom: Animalia
- Phylum: Arthropoda
- Class: Insecta
- Order: Lepidoptera
- Family: Thyrididae
- Genus: Epaena
- Species: E. complicatalis

Binomial name
- Epaena complicatalis (Warren, 1897)

Synonyms
- Rhodoneura complicatalis Warren, 1897

= Epaena complicatalis =

Species of moth

Epaena complicatalis is a species of moth of the family Thyrididae. It is found in Sumatra, West Malaysia, Brunei, Borneo (Sabah, Sarawak), Kalimantan Timur in lowland to upper montane forest at altitudes of about 1700 m.

The fasciation of this medium-sized (22–38 mm) species is distinctive and not very variable.
