= Cecidothyris orbiferalis =

Scientific classification
- Domain: Eukaryota
- Kingdom: Animalia
- Phylum: Arthropoda
- Class: Insecta
- Order: Lepidoptera
- Family: Thyrididae
- Genus: cecidothyris
- Species: C. orbiferalis

Binomial name
- Cecidothyris orbiferalis (Gaede, 1917)

Synonyms
- Proterozeuxis orbiferalis Gaede, 1917

Species of moth

Cecidothyris orbiferalis is a species of moth of the family Thyrididae. It is found in the small African country of Togo.

The wings of this species are reddish brown with numerous small and big spots. Its wingspan is 23–26 mm.
