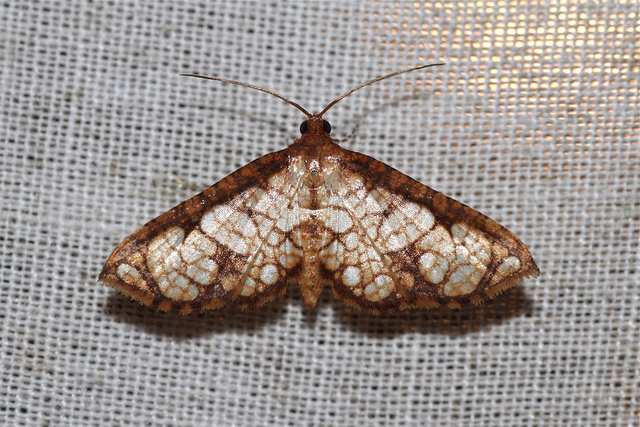

Scientific classification
- Kingdom: Animalia
- Phylum: Arthropoda
- Class: Insecta
- Order: Lepidoptera
- Family: Thyrididae
- Genus: Hypolamprus
- Species: H. taphiusalis

Binomial name
- Hypolamprus taphiusalis (Walker, 1859)

Synonyms
- Botys taphiusalis Walker, 1859; Siculodes globulifera Pagenstecher, 1892

= Hypolamprus taphiusalis =

Species of moth

Hypolamprus taphiusalis is a species of moth of the family Thyrididae. It is found in West Malaysia, Singapore, Sumatra, Brunei, Borneo (Sabah, Sarawak) and Java. The habitat consists of lowland to lower montane forest at altitudes of about 1,500 meters.

The wingspan is 15–19 mm. A small species with a very striking reticulate (net-like), dark brown patterning. Some specimens differ in the size of various fenestrae although the overall distribution of these fenestrae is similar.
