= Cecidothyris pexa =

Scientific classification
- Kingdom: Animalia
- Phylum: Arthropoda
- Class: Insecta
- Order: Lepidoptera
- Family: Thyrididae
- Genus: cecidothyris
- Species: C. pexa

Binomial name
- Cecidothyris pexa (Hampson, 1906)

Synonyms
- Cecidothyris guttulata Aurivilius 1910

Species of moth

Cecidothyris pexa is a species of moth of the family Thyrididae. It is found in South Africa and Tanzania.

The wingspan of this species is 25–34 mm.

== Subspecies ==
- Cecidothyris pexa pexa (Hampson, 1906)
- Cecidothyris pexa guttulata (Aurivillius, 1910)
