= Sijua plagalis =

Scientific classification
- Domain: Eukaryota
- Kingdom: Animalia
- Phylum: Arthropoda
- Class: Insecta
- Order: Lepidoptera
- Family: Thyrididae
- Genus: Sijua
- Species: S. plagalis

Binomial name
- Sijua plagalis (Gaede, 1917)

Synonyms
- Rhodoneura plagalis Gaede 1917

Species of moth

Sijua plagalis is a species of moth of the family Thyrididae. It is found in Cameroon.

The wingspan of the female of this species is 20 mm.
