= Mathoris magica =

Scientific classification
- Domain: Eukaryota
- Kingdom: Animalia
- Phylum: Arthropoda
- Class: Insecta
- Order: Lepidoptera
- Family: Thyrididae
- Genus: Mathoris
- Species: M. magica

Binomial name
- Mathoris magica Gaede, 1917

Species of moth

Mathoris magica is a species of moth of the family Thyrididae. It is found in Ghana, Cameroon, Equatorial Guinea, Gabon and Uganda.

The wings are black brown and the wingspan of this species is 14–15 mm. This species has morphological similarities to South American species - it is the only known species of African Thyrididae that has no round eyes. In Mathoris magica the eyes are posteriorly truncate or slightly reniform (kidney shaped).
