= Aglaopus glareola =

Scientific classification
- Kingdom: Animalia
- Phylum: Arthropoda
- Clade: Pancrustacea
- Class: Insecta
- Order: Lepidoptera
- Family: Thyrididae
- Genus: Aglaopus
- Species: A. glareola

Binomial name
- Aglaopus glareola C. Felder, R. Felder & Rogenhofer, 1874

Species of moth

Aglaopus glareola is a moth of the family Thyrididae. The species was first described by Cajetan Felder, Rudolf Felder and Alois Friedrich Rogenhofer in 1874. It is found in Sri Lanka, and Borneo.
