= Hapana minima =

Scientific classification
- Kingdom: Animalia
- Phylum: Arthropoda
- Clade: Pancrustacea
- Class: Insecta
- Order: Lepidoptera
- Family: Thyrididae
- Genus: Hapana
- Species: H. minima

Binomial name
- Hapana minima Whalley, 1971

Species of moth

Hapana minima is a species of moth of the family Thyrididae. It is found in Cameroon, Mozambique and Angola.

They have a wing length of 6.5 mm and are the smallest moths of the genus Hapana.
