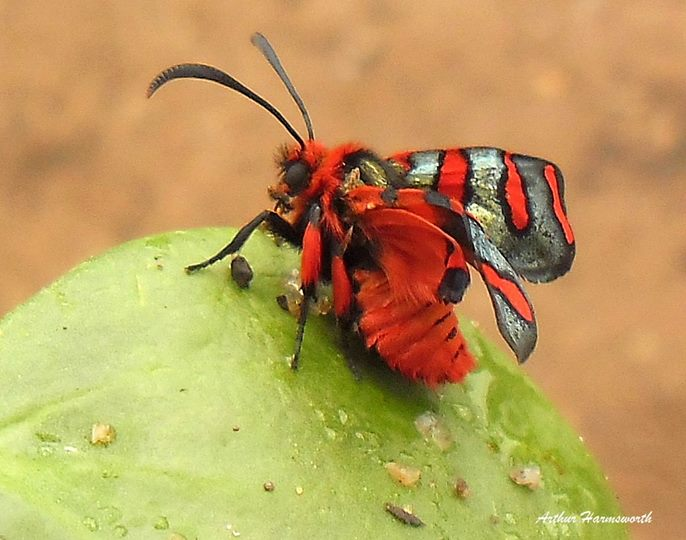

Scientific classification
- Kingdom: Animalia
- Phylum: Arthropoda
- Class: Insecta
- Order: Lepidoptera
- Family: Thyrididae
- Genus: Arniocera
- Species: A. erythropyga

Binomial name
- Arniocera erythropyga Wallengren, 1860

= Fire grid burnet =

Species of moth

The fire grid burnet (Arniocera erythropyga) is a day-flying moth of the family Thyrididae found in Zimbabwe and Malawi to Mozambique and South Africa.

This moth looks different from other burnets, mainly because of its colours. The common name of this moth refers to its fore wing pattern of black-edged, red bands on a metallic blue-green ground colour. The hind wing is pinkish red with a broad, marginal band of black. Males have hairs covering their head.
