= Chrysotypus vittiferalis =

Scientific classification
- Domain: Eukaryota
- Kingdom: Animalia
- Phylum: Arthropoda
- Class: Insecta
- Order: Lepidoptera
- Family: Thyrididae
- Genus: Chrysotypus
- Species: C. vittiferalis

Binomial name
- Chrysotypus vittiferalis (Gaede, 1917)

Synonyms
- Proterozeuxis vittiferalis Gaede, 1917

Species of moth

Chrysotypus vittiferalis is a species of moth of the family Thyrididae first described by Max Gaede in 1917. It is found in Ghana and Tanzania.

The body of this species is red brown, and the underside of the thorax is whitish. The wings are yellow brown with a net of thick and thin red-brown lines and a wingspan of 35 mm.
