= Hapana carcealis =

Scientific classification
- Domain: Eukaryota
- Kingdom: Animalia
- Phylum: Arthropoda
- Class: Insecta
- Order: Lepidoptera
- Family: Thyrididae
- Genus: Hapana
- Species: H. carcealis

Binomial name
- Hapana carcealis Whalley, 1971

Synonyms
- Hapana obscuralis auct. nec (Hampson, 1893)

Species of moth

Hapana carcealis is a species of moth of the family Thyrididae. It is found in India, Tanzania, Kenya, Malawi, Seychelles (Aldabra), Comoros, Zimbabwe and Mauritius.

They have a winglength between, 7.5 and 10 mm. The specimens from Aldabra are smaller than those from the continent. Those from Mauritius are intermediate in size.

Externally this species is very similar to Hapana verticalis. The male can be distinguished by the large reddish patch at the hindwings of H. carcealis and the genitalia are different.
