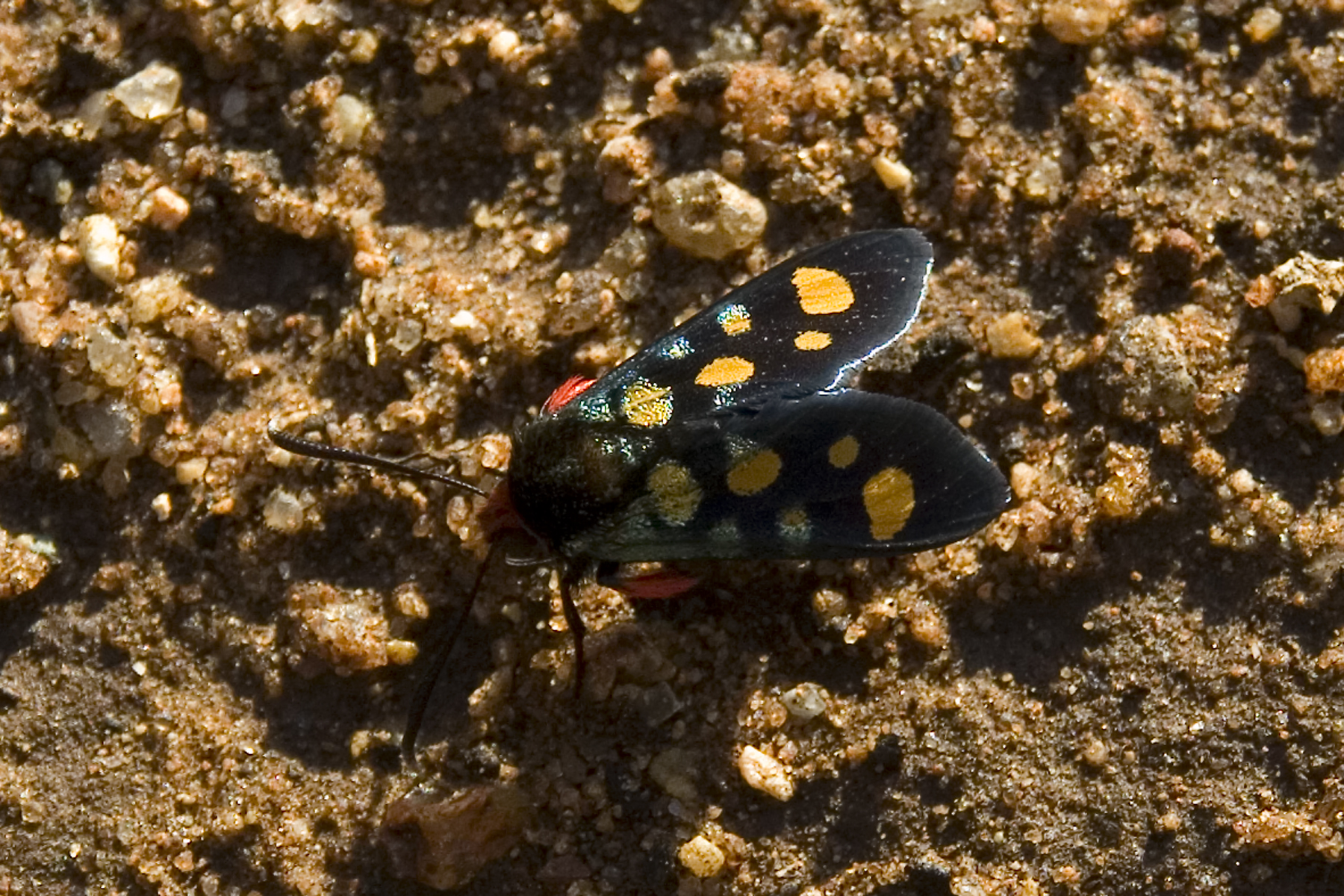

Scientific classification
- Domain: Eukaryota
- Kingdom: Animalia
- Phylum: Arthropoda
- Class: Insecta
- Order: Lepidoptera
- Superfamily: Thyridoidea
- Family: Thyrididae
- Genus: Arniocera
- Species: A. auriguttata

Binomial name
- Arniocera auriguttata Hopffer, 1857

= Arniocera auriguttata =

Species of moth

Arniocera auriguttata is a species of moth of the family Thyrididae. It is found in South Africa.
