= Mathoris loceusalis =

Scientific classification
- Kingdom: Animalia
- Phylum: Arthropoda
- Class: Insecta
- Order: Lepidoptera
- Family: Thyrididae
- Genus: Mathoris
- Species: M. loceusalis

Binomial name
- Mathoris loceusalis Walker, 1859

Synonyms
- Pyralis thyralis Walker, 1866

Species of moth

Mathoris loceusalis is a moth of the family Thyrididae first described by Francis Walker in 1859. It is found in India, Sri Lanka and Australia.

Its wings are brownish with a reddish outline. Two to three red-outlined white spots are found near the cell of the forewings. There is a black spot near the middle of the hindwings.

Larval food plants are Dendrophthoe glabrescens and Loranthus species.
