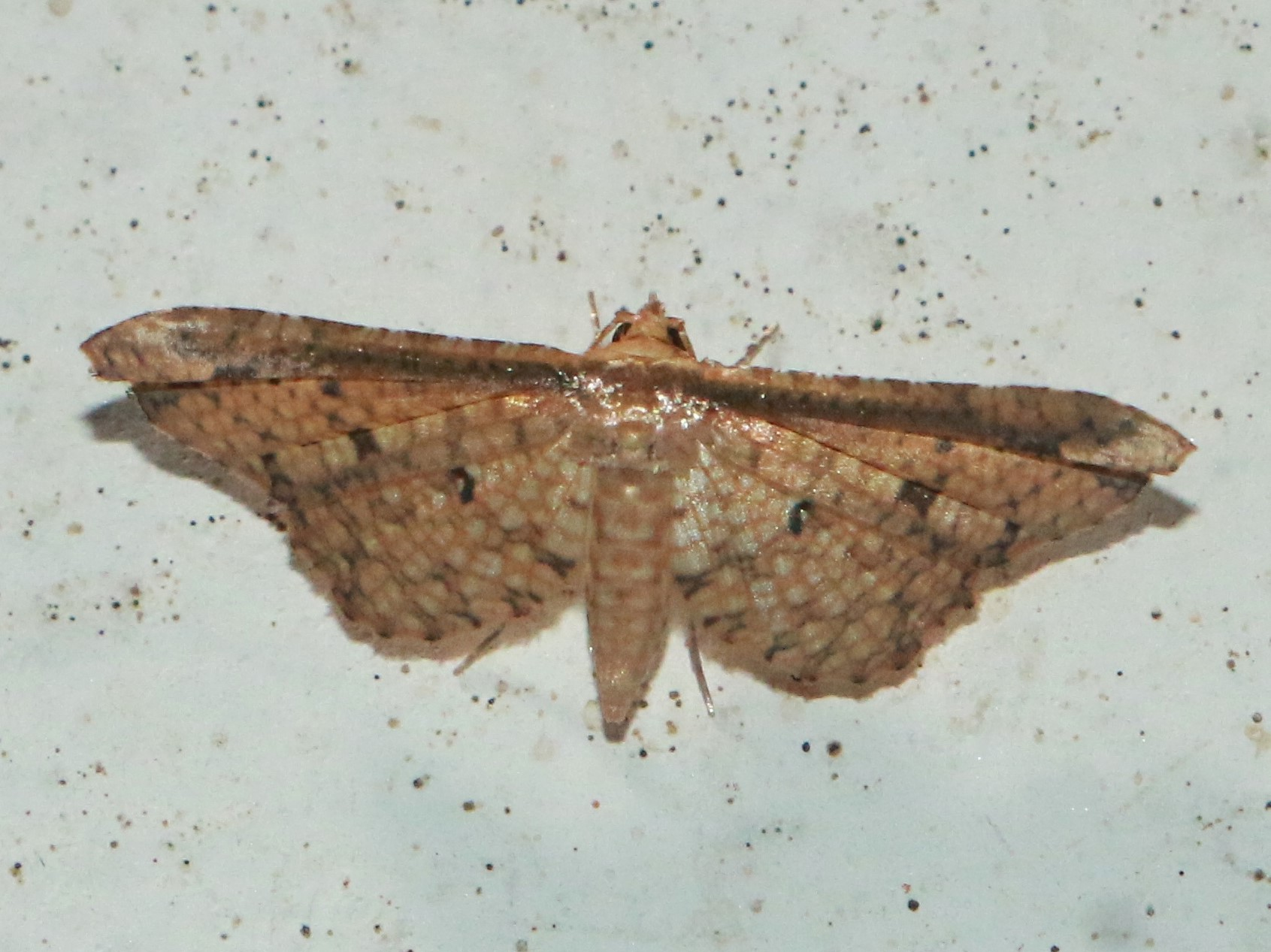

Scientific classification
- Kingdom: Animalia
- Phylum: Arthropoda
- Class: Insecta
- Order: Lepidoptera
- Family: Thyrididae
- Genus: Pharambara
- Species: P. splendida

Binomial name
- Pharambara splendida (Butler, 1887)

Synonyms
- List: Brixia dialitha Tams, 1935; Hypolamprus lineatellus van Eecke, 1929; Rhodoneura rhaphiducha Turner, 1911; Pharambara parcipunctalis Warren, 1896

= Pharambara splendida =

Species of moth

Pharambara splendida is a species of moth in the family Thyrididae that was first described by Arthur Gardiner Butler in 1887. It is found in India, Sri Lanka, Malaysia, Samoa, Taiwan, Sumatra and Australia.

Its larval host plant is Macaranga tanarius.
