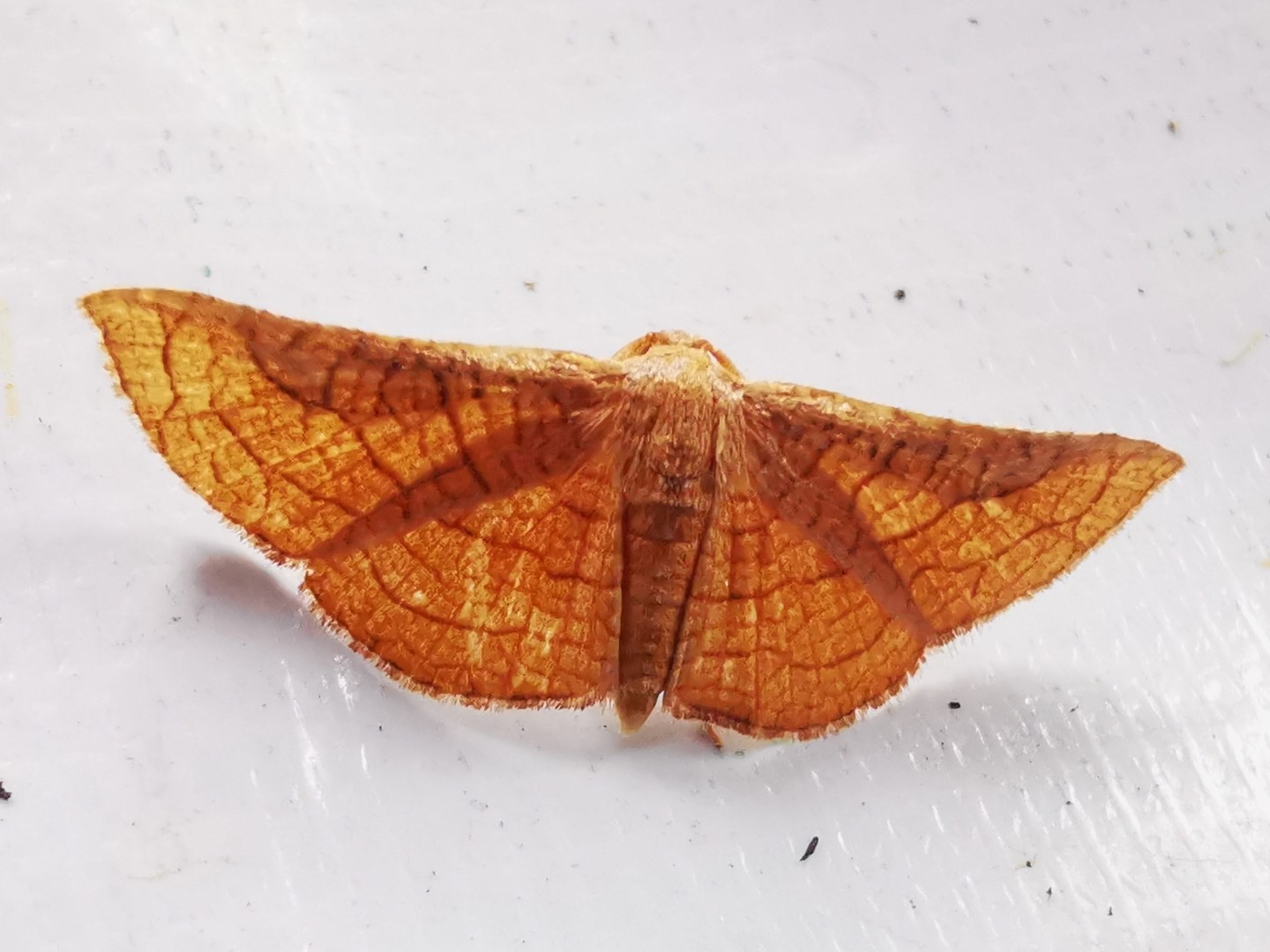

Scientific classification
- Kingdom: Animalia
- Phylum: Arthropoda
- Class: Insecta
- Order: Lepidoptera
- Family: Thyrididae
- Genus: Microctenucha; Warren, 1900
- Species: M. munda

Binomial name
- Microctenucha munda (Hampson, 1893)

Synonyms
- Rhodoneura munda Hampson 1893

= Microctenucha =

Genus of moths

Microctenucha is a monotypic moth genus in the family Thyrididae first described by William Warren in 1900. Its only species, Microctenucha munda, was first described by George Hampson in 1893.

Its wingspan is 30 mm.

== Distribution ==
It is found in Sikkim, India.

== Biology ==
Known host plants of this species are Litsea glutinosa and Neolitsea zeylanica (Lauraceae).
