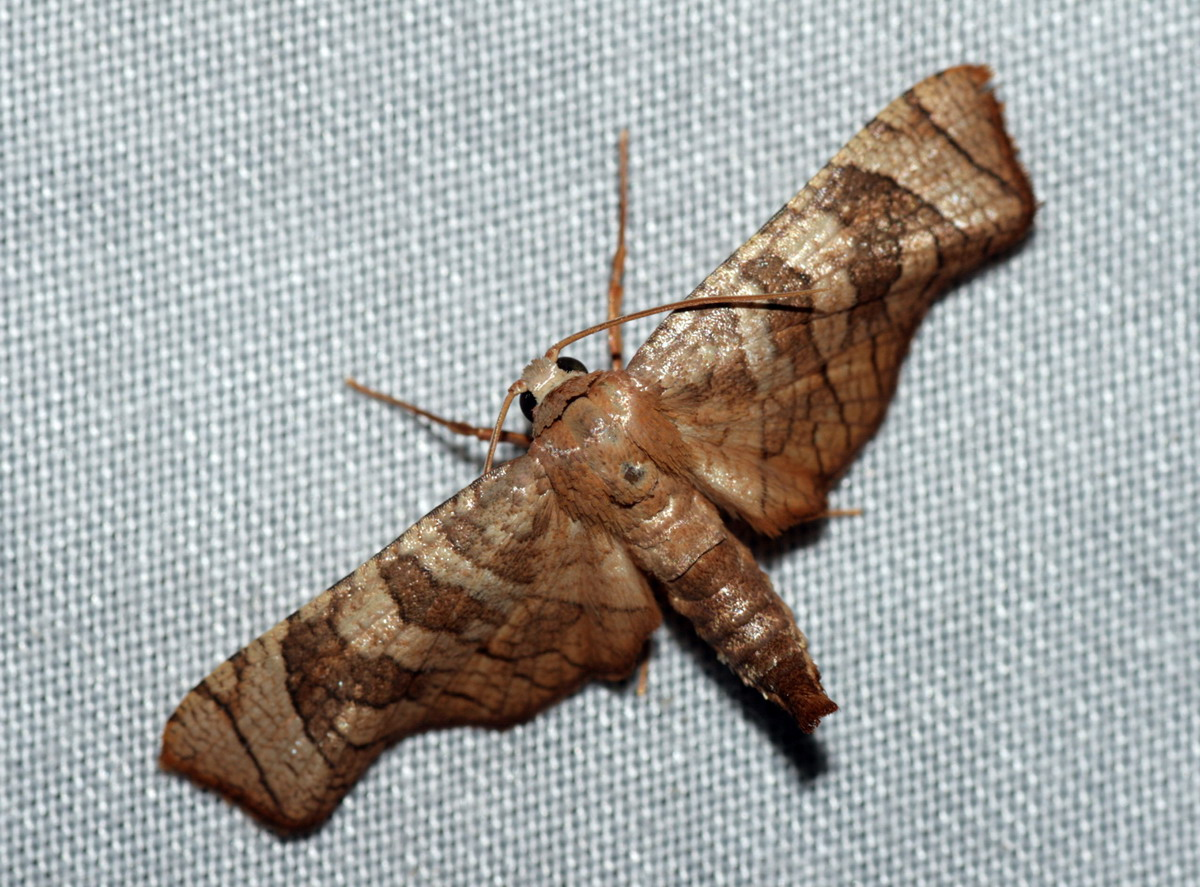
- Opula lepida (Thyrididae: Siculodinae: Siculodini)

Scientific classification
- Kingdom: Animalia
- Phylum: Arthropoda
- Class: Insecta
- Order: Lepidoptera
- Family: Thyrididae
- Genus: Opula; Walker, 1869

= Opula =

Genus of moths

Opulaa is a genus of moths of the family Thyrididae.

Type species: Opula impletalis Walker, 1869

== Species ==
Some species of this genus are:

- Opula chopardi (Viette, 1954)
- Opula hebes Whalley 1971
- Opula impletalis Walker 1869
- Opula lineata Whalley, 1967
- Opula monsterosa Whalley 1971
- Opula perigrapha Hampson 1914
- Opula scardialis Rebel 1914
- Opula spilotata Warren 1898
