= Cornuterus =

Scientific classification
- Domain: Eukaryota
- Kingdom: Animalia
- Phylum: Arthropoda
- Class: Insecta
- Order: Lepidoptera
- Family: Thyrididae
- Genus: Cornuterus; Whalley, 1971

Genus of moths

Cornuterus is a genus of moths of the family Thyrididae.

It was first described in 1971 by Paul E.S. Whalley.

== Species ==
Some species of this genus are:

- Cornuterus nigropunctula Pagenstecher 1892
- Cornuterus palairanta Bethune-Baker 1911
- Cornuterus paratrivius Whalley 1971
- Cornuterus trivius (Whalley, 1967)
