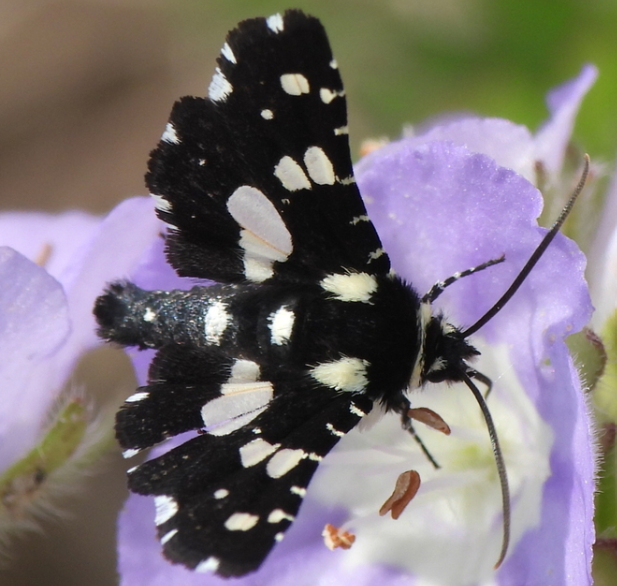
- Pseudothyris sepulchralis

Scientific classification
- Kingdom: Animalia
- Phylum: Arthropoda
- Class: Insecta
- Order: Lepidoptera
- Family: Thyrididae
- Subfamily: Thyridinae
- Genus: Pseudothyris; Thiele, 1986

= Pseudothyris =

Genus of moth

Pseudothyris is a monotypic moth of the family Thyrididae, its one known species being Pseudothyris sepulchralis. It was removed from the genus Thyris in 1986.
