= Toosa (moth) =

Scientific classification
- Domain: Eukaryota
- Kingdom: Animalia
- Phylum: Arthropoda
- Class: Insecta
- Order: Lepidoptera
- Family: Thyrididae
- Subfamily: Charideinae
- Genus: Toosa; Walker, 1856

Synonyms
- Cicinnoscelis Holland, 1894

Genus of moths

Toosa is a genus of moths of the family Thyrididae erected by Francis Walker in 1856. The species are found in Africa.

== Species ==
Some species of this genus are:

- Toosa batesi Bethune-Baker, 1927
- Toosa glaucopiformis Walker, 1856
- Toosa longipes (Holland, 1896)
