= Nemea (moth) =

Scientific classification
- Domain: Eukaryota
- Kingdom: Animalia
- Phylum: Arthropoda
- Class: Insecta
- Order: Lepidoptera
- Family: Thyrididae
- Genus: Nemea; Whalley, 1971

Genus of moths

Nemea is a genus of moths of the family Thyrididae from Africa.

== Species ==
Some species of this genus are:

- Nemea ankole Whalley, 1971
- Nemea betousalis (Gaede, 1917)
- Nemea eugrapha (Hampson, 1906)
- Nemea nivosa Whalley, 1971
- Nemea tamsi Whalley, 1971
