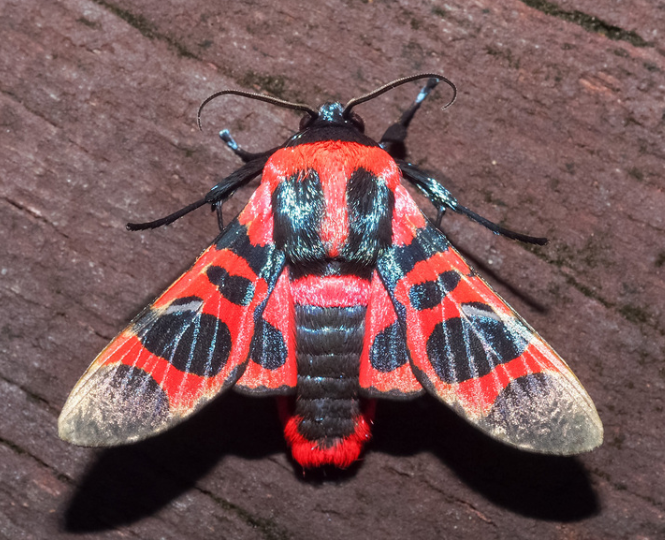

Scientific classification
- Kingdom: Animalia
- Phylum: Arthropoda
- Class: Insecta
- Order: Lepidoptera
- Family: Thyrididae
- Genus: Glanycus

= Glanycus =

Genus of moths

Glanycus is a genus of moth of the family Thyrididae.

== Species ==
Glanycus contains the following species:

- Glanycus blachieri
- Glanycus tricolor
- Glanycus sigionus
- Glanycus coendersi
- Glanycus insolitus
