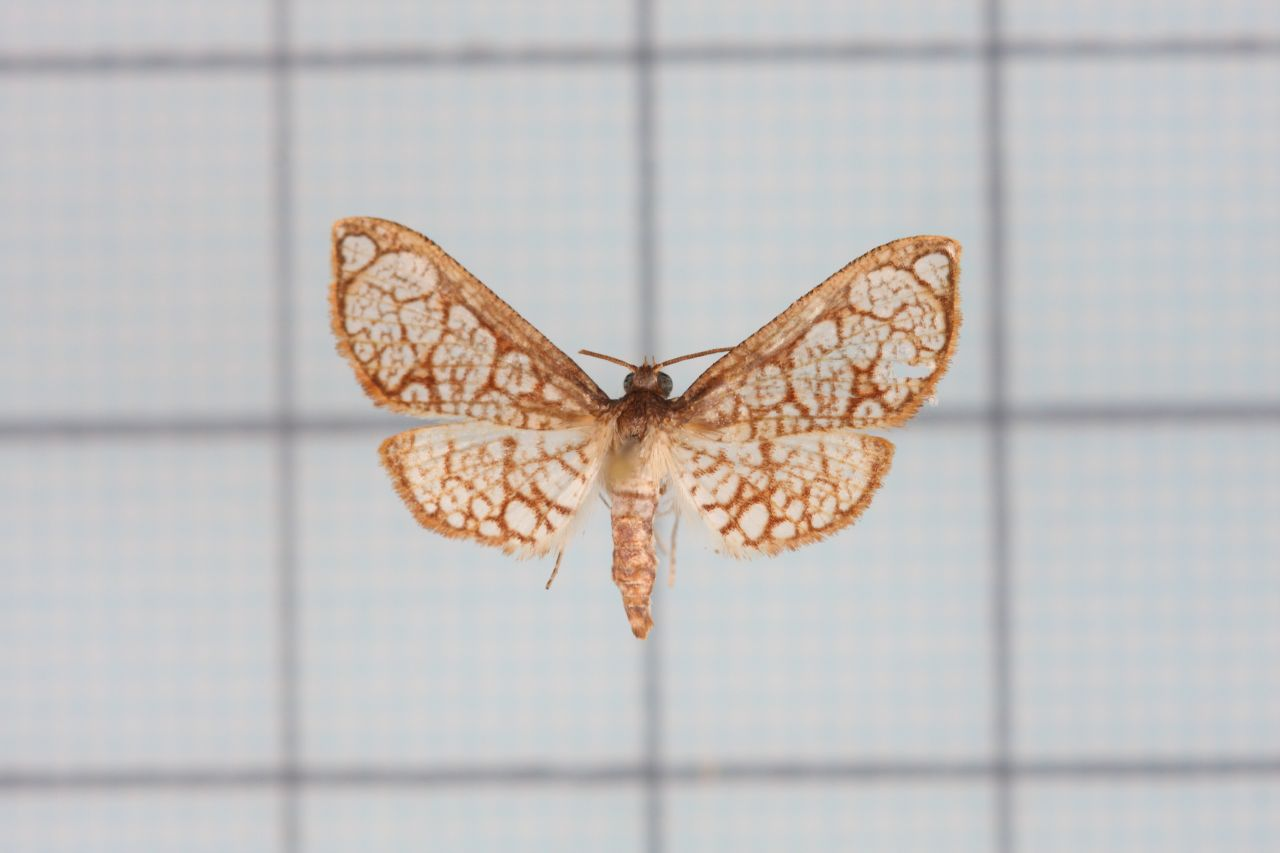
- Hypolamprus taphiusalis

Scientific classification
- Kingdom: Animalia
- Phylum: Arthropoda
- Class: Insecta
- Order: Lepidoptera
- Family: Thyrididae
- Tribe: Siculodini
- Genus: Hypolamprus; Hampson, [1893]

= Hypolamprus =

Genus of moths

Hypolamprus is a genus of moths of the family Thyrididae described by George Hampson in 1893.

== Description ==
Palpi slight, upturned and reaching above vertex of head. Antennae minutely ciliated in male. Neuration is similar to Rhodoneura, differs due to stalked forewings in veins 8 and 9.

== Species ==
- Hypolamprus angulalis Moore, [1888]
- Hypolamprus bastialis (Walker, 1859)
- Hypolamprus crossosticha (Turner, 1911)
- Hypolamprus curvifluus (Warren, 1898) (or Hypolamprus curviflua)
- Hypolamprus distrinctus Whalley, 1971
- Hypolamprus emblicalis Moore, 1888
- Hypolamprus gangaba Whalley, 1971
- Hypolamprus hypostilpna (Turner, 1941)
- Hypolamprus janenschi (Gaede, 1917)
- Hypolamprus kamadenalis (Strand, 1920)
- Hypolamprus lepraota Hampson, 1910
- Hypolamprus marginepunctalis (Leech, 1889)
- Hypolamprus melilialis (Swinhoe, 1900)
- Hypolamprus quaesitus Whalley, 1971
- Hypolamprus reticulatus (Butler, 1886)
- Hypolamprus sciodes Turner, 1911
- Hypolamprus semiusta Warren, 1908
- Hypolamprus striatalis (Swinhoe, 1885)
- Hypolamprus stylophorus (Swinhoe, 1895)
- Hypolamprus subrosealis (Leech, 1898)
- Hypolamprus taphiusalis (Walker, 1859)
- Hypolamprus tessellata (Swinhoe, 1904)
- Hypolamprus ypsilon (Warren, 1899)
