= Pharambara micacealis =

Scientific classification
- Kingdom: Animalia
- Phylum: Arthropoda
- Clade: Pancrustacea
- Class: Insecta
- Order: Lepidoptera
- Family: Thyrididae
- Genus: Pharambara
- Species: P. micacealis

Binomial name
- Pharambara micacealis (Walker, 1866)

Synonyms
- Pyralis disjunctalis Walker, 1866; Siculodes papuensis Pagenstecher, 1886

Species of moth

Pharambara micacealis is a moth of the family Thyrididae first described by Francis Walker in 1866. It is found in Sri Lanka, New Guinea and Australia.

Its wings are fawn coloured with some dark wavy lines.

One subspecies is recorded - Pharambara micacealis occlusa Warren, 1897.
