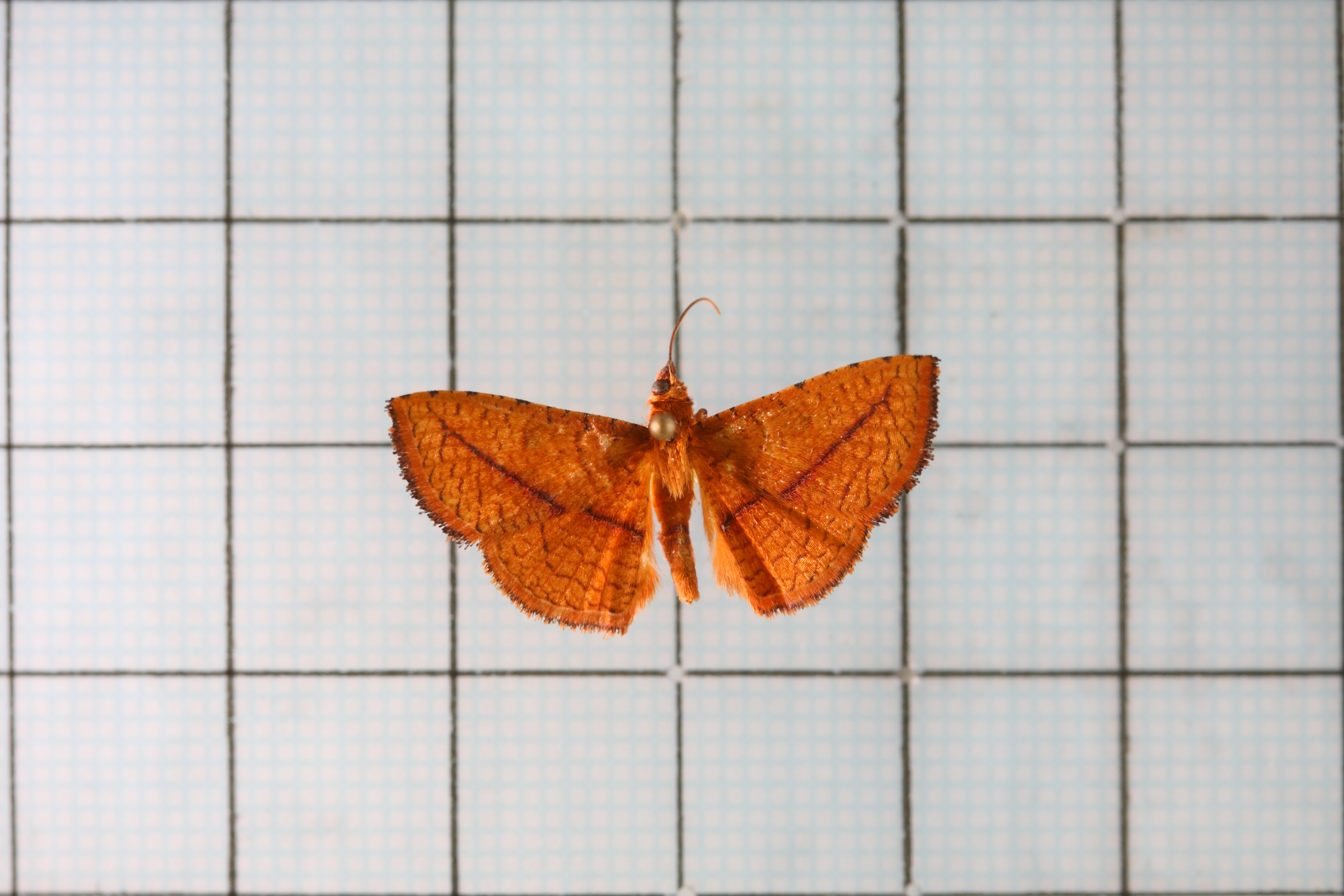

Scientific classification
- Kingdom: Animalia
- Phylum: Arthropoda
- Class: Insecta
- Order: Lepidoptera
- Family: Thyrididae
- Genus: Striglina
- Species: S. scitaria

Binomial name
- Striglina scitaria (Walker, 1862)

Synonyms
- Drepanodes scitaria Walker, 1862; Strigulina scitaria; Homodes thermesioides Snellen, 1877

= Striglina scitaria =

Daincha leaf webber

Species of moth

Striglina scitaria, the daincha leaf webber, is a species of moth of the family Thyrididae described by Francis Walker in 1862. It is found in Taiwan, Japan, India, Sri Lanka, Maldives, Myanmar, the Andamans, Borneo, New Guinea, Fiji and Australia. It is a major pest which mainly attacks legume crops.

== Description ==
Its wingspan is about 3 cm. Adults are reddish ocherous with wings evenly striated with brown. An oblique reddish-brown line runs from apex of the forewing to the inner margin of hindwing before the middle. Ventral side is with a dark spot at end of cell of forewing. The oblique line coming out as black streaks ventrally. In some subspecies, there is a line on the hindwing from the same point on costa as the oblique line and curved to inner margin above anal angle or oblique to outer margin before anal angle. Larvae are olive colored. First somite ocherous and head is black. There are few short distal hairs and series of transverse black dots from second to terminal somite.

== Ecology ==
The larvae feed on Sesbania bispinosa, Cassia corymbosa, Notonia grandiflora, Cassia fistula, Albizia procera, Derris elliptica, Combretum indicmu, Bauhinia racemosa, Kleinia grandiflora and Quisqualis indica.
