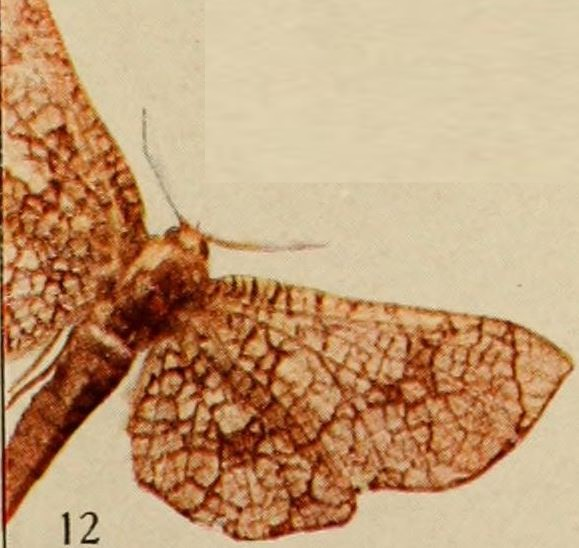
- Chrysotypus medjensis

Scientific classification
- Domain: Eukaryota
- Kingdom: Animalia
- Phylum: Arthropoda
- Class: Insecta
- Order: Lepidoptera
- Family: Thyrididae
- Genus: Chrysotypus; Butler, 1879

Synonyms
- Argyrotypus Butler, 1879; Proterozeuxis Warren, 1899

= Chrysotypus =

Genus of moths

Chrysotypus is a genus of moths of the family Thyrididae.

Type species: Chrysotypus dives Butler 1879

== Species ==
Some species of this genus are:

- Chrysotypus animula Viette 1957
- Chrysotypus caryophyllae Frappa 1954
- Chrysotypus circumfuscus Whalley 1971
- Chrysotypus cupreus Kenrick 1913
- Chrysotypus circumfuscus Whalley, 1971
- Chrysotypus dawsoni Distant 1897
- Chrysotypus dives Butler 1879
- Chrysotypus enigmaticus Whalley 1977
- Chrysotypus lakato Viette 1958
- Chrysotypus locuples Mabille 1879
- Chrysotypus luteofuscus Whalley 1971
- Chrysotypus maculatus Viette 1960
- Chrysotypus medjensis (Holland, 1920)
- Chrysotypus perineti Viette 1957
- Chrysotypus phoebus Viette 1960
- Chrysotypus quadratus Whalley 1971
- Chrysotypus reticulatus Whalley 1971
- Chrysotypus splendida Warren 1899
- Chrysotypus subflavus Whalley 1971
- Chrysotypus tessellata Warren 1908
- Chrysotypus vittiferalis Gaede 1917
