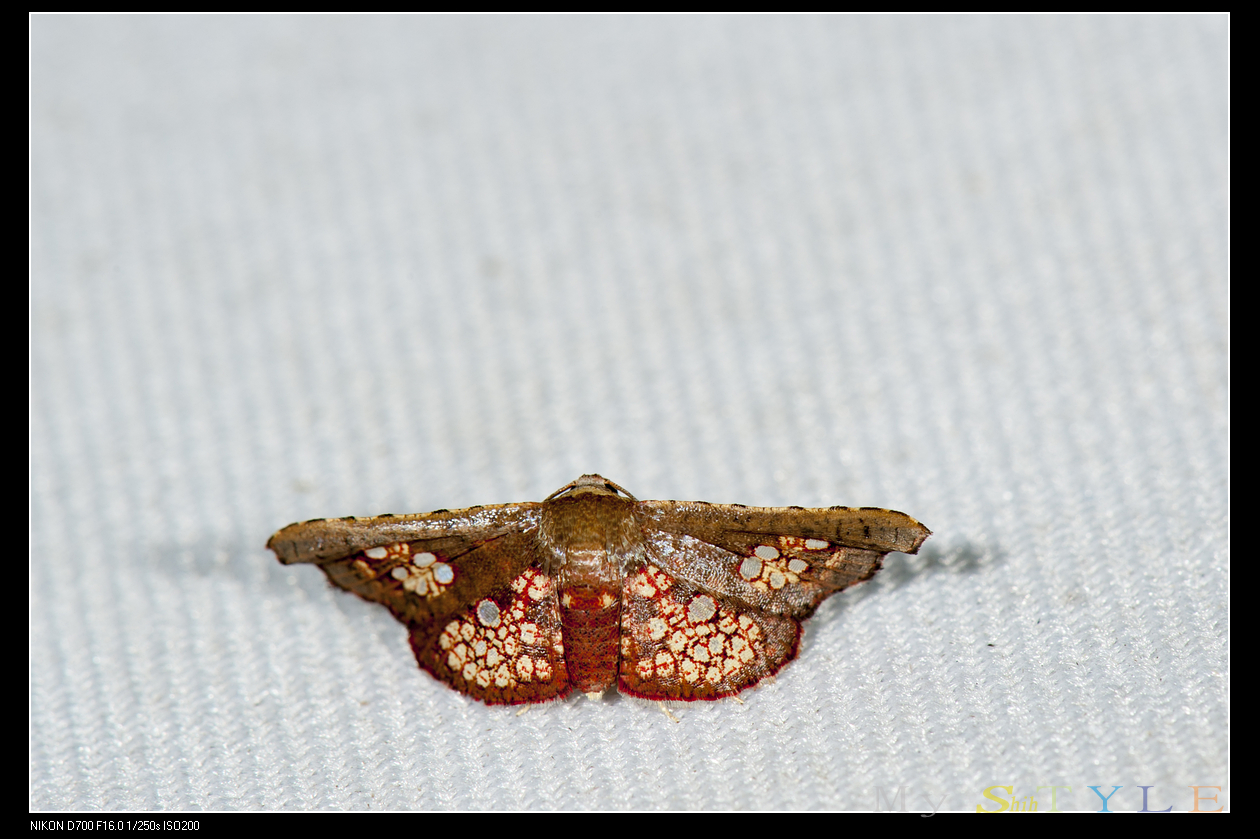

Scientific classification
- Kingdom: Animalia
- Phylum: Arthropoda
- Class: Insecta
- Order: Lepidoptera
- Family: Thyrididae
- Genus: Mathoris; Guenée, 1877

Synonyms
- Letchena Moore, 1885

= Mathoris =

Genus of moths

Mathoris is a genus of moths of the family Thyrididae.

== Species ==
Some species of this genus are:

- Mathoris crepuscula Guenee 1877
- Mathoris loceusalis (Walker 1859)
- Mathoris magica Gaede 1917
- Mathoris thyralis (Walker 1866)
