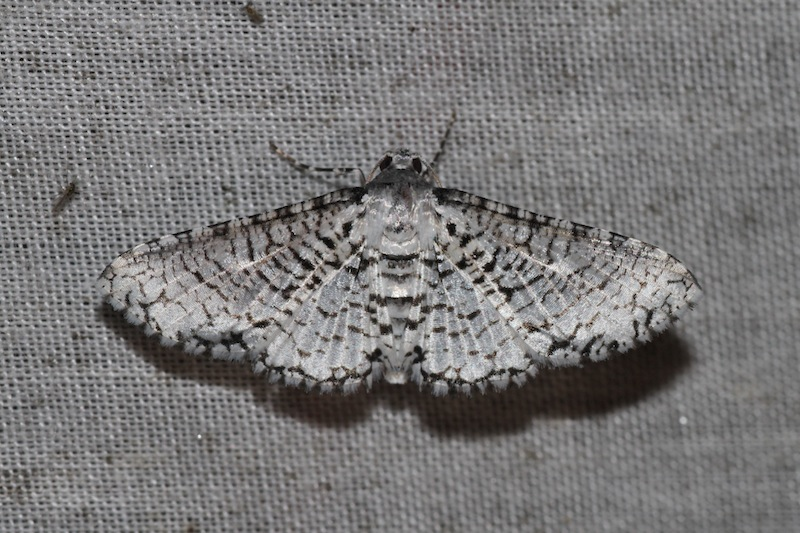
- Epaena complicatalis

Scientific classification
- Kingdom: Animalia
- Phylum: Arthropoda
- Class: Insecta
- Order: Lepidoptera
- Family: Thyrididae
- Genus: Epaena; Karsch, 1900

= Epaena =

Genus of moths

Epaena is a genus of African moths of the family Thyrididae.

== Species ==
Some species of this genus are:

- Epaena andida (Whalley, 1971
- Epaena candidatalis (Swinhoe, 1905)
- Epaena complicatalis (Warren, 1897)
- Epaena danista (Whalley, 1971)
- Epaena inops (Gaede, 1917)
- Epaena pellucida Whalley, 1971
- Epaena trijuncta (Warren, 1898)
- Epaena vocata (Whalley, 1971
- Epaena xystica (Whalley, 1971
