= Cecidothyris =

Scientific classification
- Kingdom: Animalia
- Phylum: Arthropoda
- Class: Insecta
- Order: Lepidoptera
- Family: Thyrididae
- Genus: cecidothyris Aurivillius, 1910

Genus of moths

Cecidothyris is a genus of moths of the family Thyrididae from Africa.

== Species ==
Some species of this genus are:

- Cecidothyris affinia Whalley, 1971
- Cecidothyris chrysotherma (Hampson, 1914)
- Cecidothyris longicorpa Whalley, 1971
- Cecidothyris orbiferalis (Gaede, 1917)
- Cecidothyris parobifera Whalley, 1971
- Cecidothyris pexa (Hampson, 1906)
- Cecidothyris tyrannica Whalley, 1971
