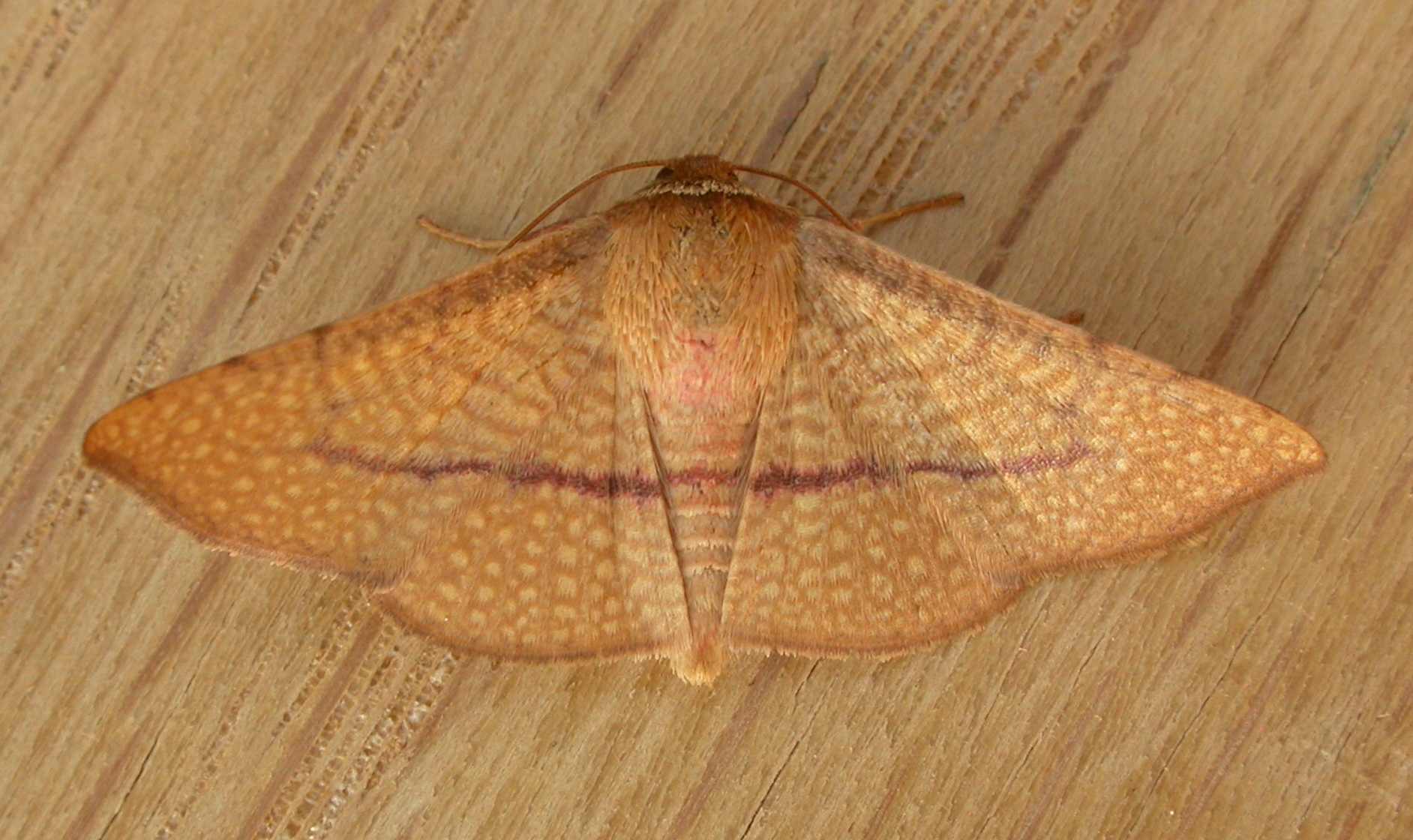

Scientific classification
- Kingdom: Animalia
- Phylum: Arthropoda
- Class: Insecta
- Order: Lepidoptera
- Family: Thyrididae
- Genus: Aglaopus
- Species: A. pyrrhata

Binomial name
- Aglaopus pyrrhata Walker, 1866

Synonyms
- Striglina australina

= Aglaopus pyrrhata =

Species of moth

Aglaopus pyrrhata is a species of moth of the family Thyrididae. It is found in most of mainland Australia.

The wingspan is about 30 mm.

The larvae feed on Eucalyptus species.
