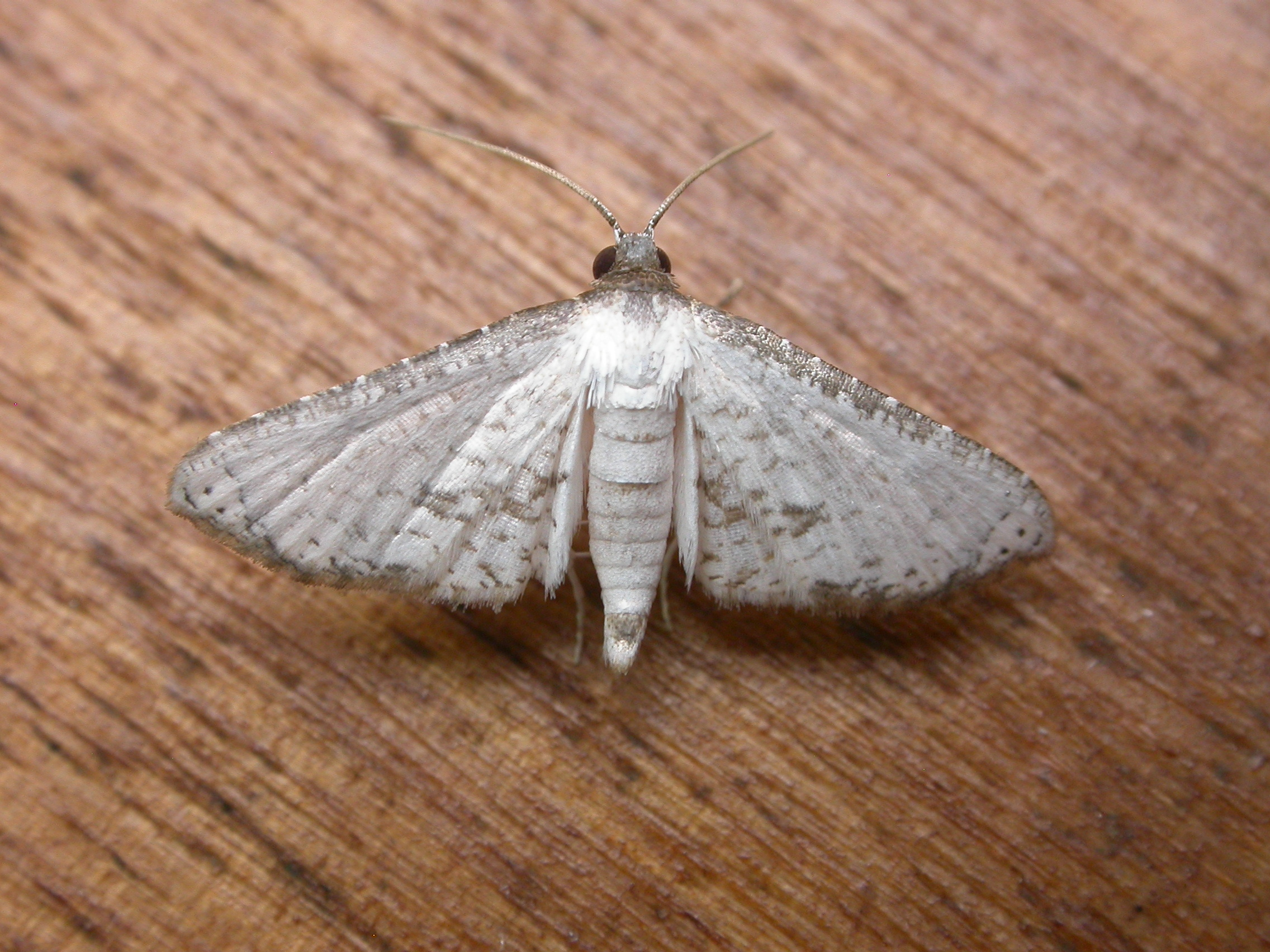

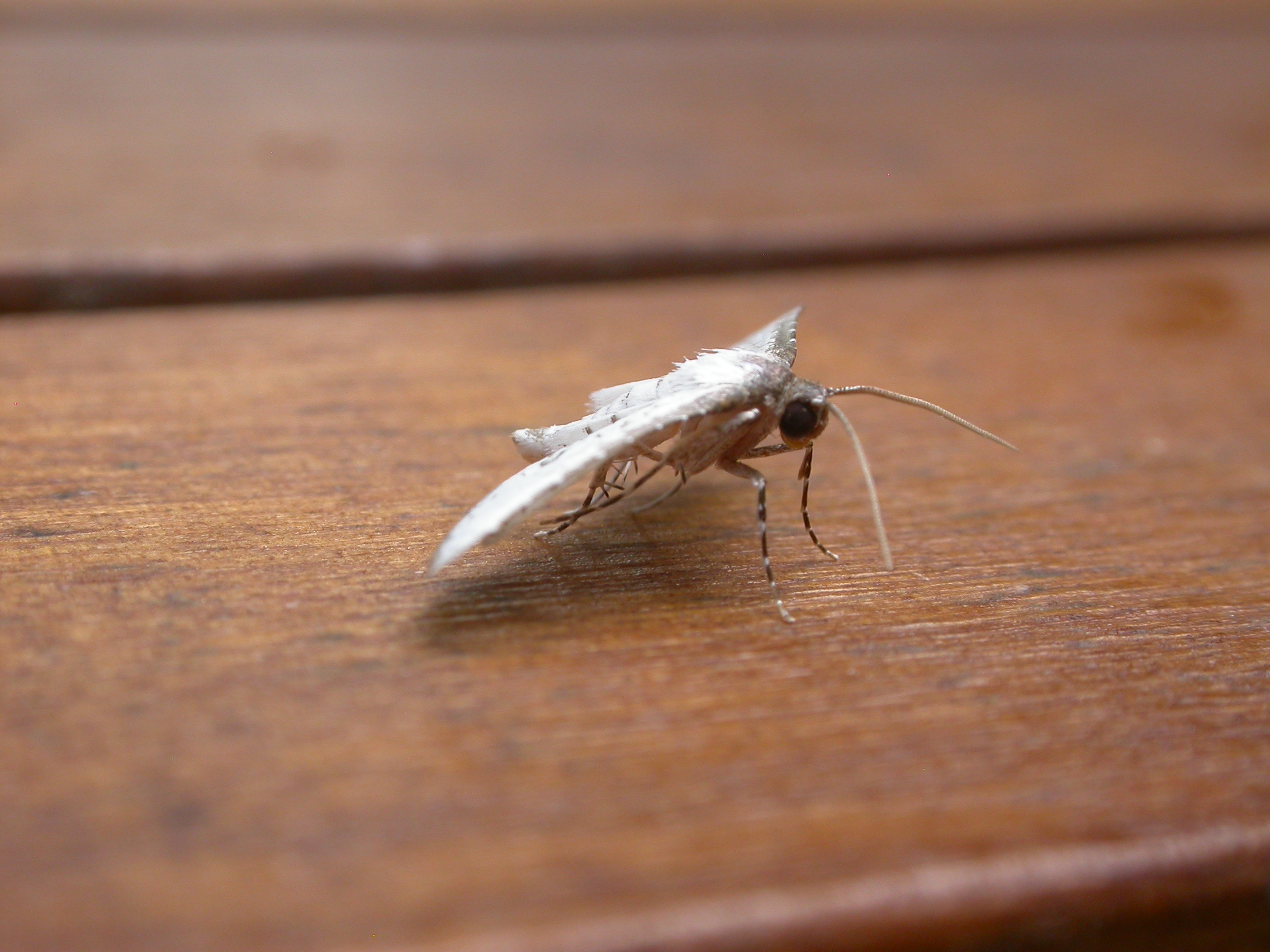

Scientific classification
- Domain: Eukaryota
- Kingdom: Animalia
- Phylum: Arthropoda
- Class: Insecta
- Order: Lepidoptera
- Family: Thyrididae
- Genus: Hypolamprus
- Species: H. melilialis

Binomial name
- Hypolamprus melilialis (C. Swinhoe, 1900)

Synonyms
- Rhodoneura melilialis C. Swinhoe, 1900

= Hypolamprus melilialis =

Species of moth

Hypolamprus melilialis is a species of moth of the family Thyrididae first described by Charles Swinhoe in 1900. It is found in Australia.

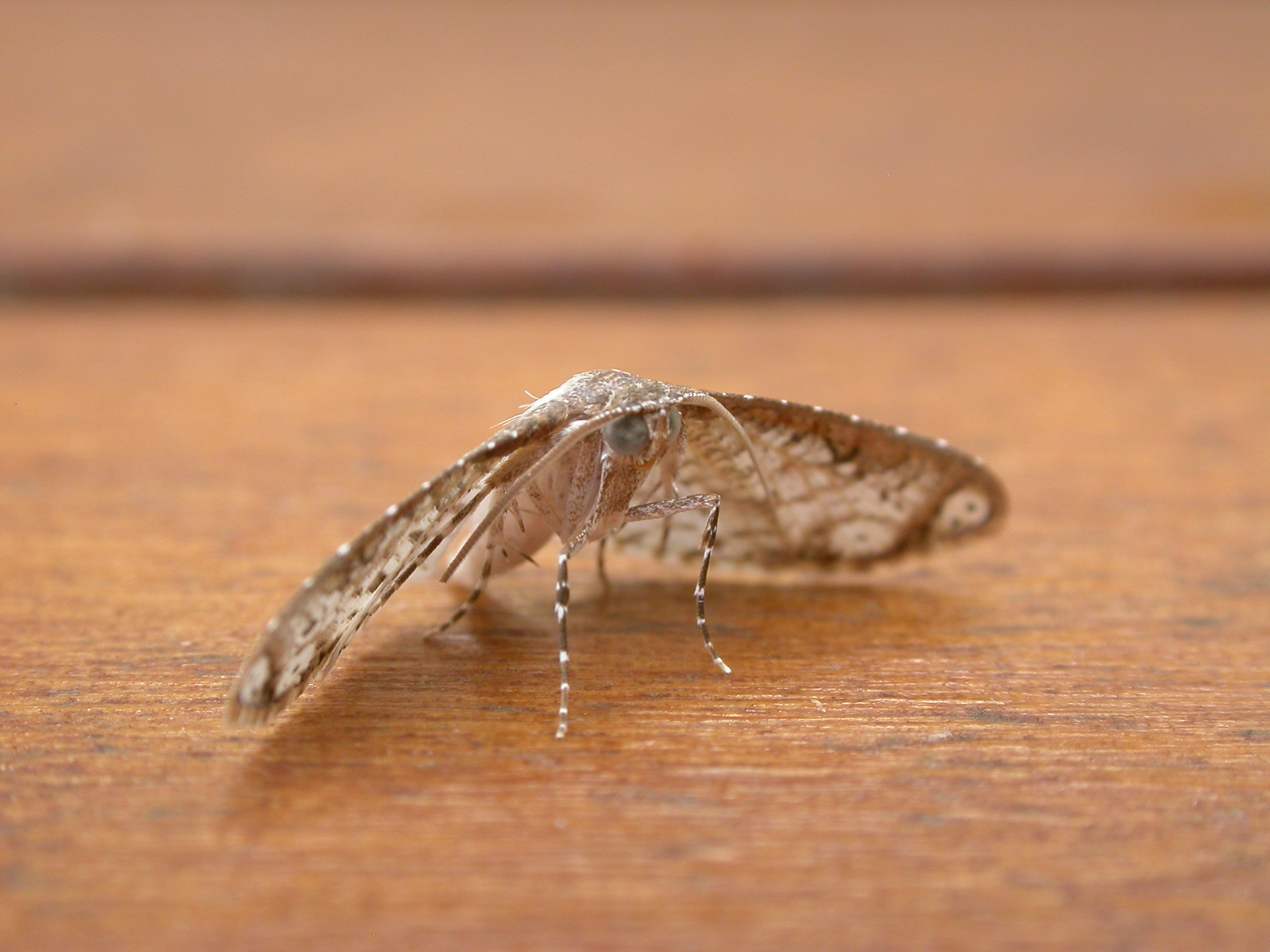
