= Kuja =

Scientific classification
- Domain: Eukaryota
- Kingdom: Animalia
- Phylum: Arthropoda
- Class: Insecta
- Order: Lepidoptera
- Family: Thyrididae
- Subfamily: Siculodinae
- Genus: Kuja; Whalley, 1971

Type species
- Rhodoneura gemmata Hampson, 1906

Genus of moths

Kuja is a genus of African moths of the family Thyrididae.

== Species ==
Some species of this genus are:

- Kuja carcassoni Whalley, 1971
- Kuja catenula (Pagenstecher, 1892)
- Kuja effrenata Whalley, 1971
- Kuja fractifascia (Warren, 1908)
- Kuja gemmata (Hampson, 1906)
- Kuja hamatipex (Hampson, 1916)
- Kuja kibala Whalley, 1971
- Kuja majuscula (Gaede, 1917)
- Kuja obliquifascia (Warren, 1908)
- Kuja squamigera (Pagenstecher, 1892)
