= Hapana verticalis =

Scientific classification
- Domain: Eukaryota
- Kingdom: Animalia
- Phylum: Arthropoda
- Class: Insecta
- Order: Lepidoptera
- Family: Thyrididae
- Genus: Hapana
- Species: H. verticalis

Binomial name
- Hapana verticalis (Warren, 1899)

Synonyms
- Hypolamprus verticalis Warren, 1899

Species of moth

Hapana verticalis is a species of moth of the family Thyrididae. It is found in Nigeria, Cameroon, Angola, Namibia, Sierra Leone, Ivory Coast, Ghana, Democratic Republic of the Congo, Uganda, Sudan, Gabon, Kenya, Zimbabwe, Mozambique, South Africa and Tanzania.

They have a wing length between 7.5 and 9.5 mm. Externally this species is very similar to Hapana carcealis. The male can be distinguished by the large reddish patch at the hindwings of H. carcealis and the genitalia are different.
