= Sijua (moth) =

Scientific classification
- Domain: Eukaryota
- Kingdom: Animalia
- Phylum: Arthropoda
- Class: Insecta
- Order: Lepidoptera
- Family: Thyrididae
- Subfamily: Thyridinae
- Genus: Sijua; Whalley, 1971

Genus of moths

Sijua is a genus of moths of the family Thyrididae from Africa.

Type species: Sijua parvula Whalley, 1971

== Species ==
Some species of this genus are:

- Sijua canitia Whalley, 1971
- Sijua flavula (Pagenstecher, 1892)
- Sijua furcatula (Pagenstecher, 1892)
- Sijua jejunalis (Gaede, 1917)
- Sijua latizonalis (Hampson, 1897)
- Sijua meriani (Gaede, 1917)
- Sijua neolatizona Whalley, 1971
- Sijua parvula Whalley, 1971
- Sijua plagalis (Gaede, 1917)
- Sijua sigillata (Warren, 1898)
