= Hapana =

Scientific classification
- Domain: Eukaryota
- Kingdom: Animalia
- Phylum: Arthropoda
- Class: Insecta
- Order: Lepidoptera
- Family: Thyrididae
- Genus: Hapana; Whalley, 1967

Genus of moths

Hapana is a genus of moths of the family Thyrididae.

This genus is known from Madagascar, Mauritius, continental Africa, Aldabra and North India. They are relatively small, with a winglength between 6 and 10.5 mm.

Type species: Hapana verticalis (Warren, 1899)

== Species ==
Some species of this genus are:

- Hapana carcealis Whalley, 1971
- Hapana milloti (Viette, 1954)
- Hapana minima Whalley, 1971
- Hapana verticalis (Warren, 1899)
