= Symphleps =

Scientific classification
- Domain: Eukaryota
- Kingdom: Animalia
- Phylum: Arthropoda
- Class: Insecta
- Order: Lepidoptera
- Family: Thyrididae
- Genus: Symphleps; Warren, 1897

Genus of moths

Symphleps is a genus of moths of the family Thyrididae.

Type species: Symphleps atomosalis Warren, 1897

== Species ==
Some species of this genus are:

- Symphleps atomosalis Hampson 1897
- Symphleps ochracea Pagenstecher 1886
- Symphleps perfusa Warren 1902
- Symphleps seta (Viette, 1958)
- Symphleps signicostata (Strand, 1913)
- Symphleps suffusa Warren, 1898
