= Hypolamprus bastialis =

Scientific classification
- Kingdom: Animalia
- Phylum: Arthropoda
- Class: Insecta
- Order: Lepidoptera
- Family: Thyrididae
- Genus: Hypolamprus
- Species: H. bastialis

Binomial name
- Hypolamprus bastialis (Walker, 1859)

Synonyms
- Rhodoneura bastialis Walker, 1859; Pyralis bastialis Walker, 1859

Species of moth

Hypolamprus bastialis is a moth of the family Thyrididae first described by Francis Walker in 1859. It is found in India, Sri Lanka, Indonesia, New Guinea and Australia.

Its wings are pale brown with a network of brown lines.
