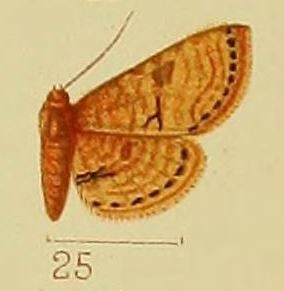
- Kalenga discata

Scientific classification
- Domain: Eukaryota
- Kingdom: Animalia
- Phylum: Arthropoda
- Class: Insecta
- Order: Lepidoptera
- Family: Thyrididae
- Genus: Kalenga; Whalley, 1971

= Kalenga (moth) =

Genus of moths

Kalenga is a genus of moths of the family Thyrididae.

This genus is known from Africa.

== Species ==
Some species of this genus are:

- Kalenga ansorgei (Warren, 1899)
- Kalenga culanota Whalley, 1971
- Kalenga maculanota Whalley, 1971
