= Collinsa =

Scientific classification
- Kingdom: Animalia
- Phylum: Arthropoda
- Clade: Pancrustacea
- Class: Insecta
- Order: Lepidoptera
- Family: Thyrididae
- Subfamily: Siculodinae
- Tribe: Siculodini
- Genus: Collinsa; Whalley, 1964

Genus of moths

Collinsa is a genus of moths from the family Thyrididae. Species of this genus are distributed across South, Southeast, and East Asia, along with eastern Australia.

== Taxonomy ==
Collinsa contains the following species:

- Collinsa acutalis
- Collinsa ancylosema
- Collinsa cellulata
- Collinsa commanotata
- Collinsa crypsilitha
- Collinsa cuprea
- Collinsa decoratalis
- Collinsa ferreiceps
- Collinsa rhodosticta
- Collinsa roseopuncta
- Collinsa semiperforata
- Collinsa sphoraria
- Collinsa subcostalis
- Collinsa submicans
- Collinsa subscripta
