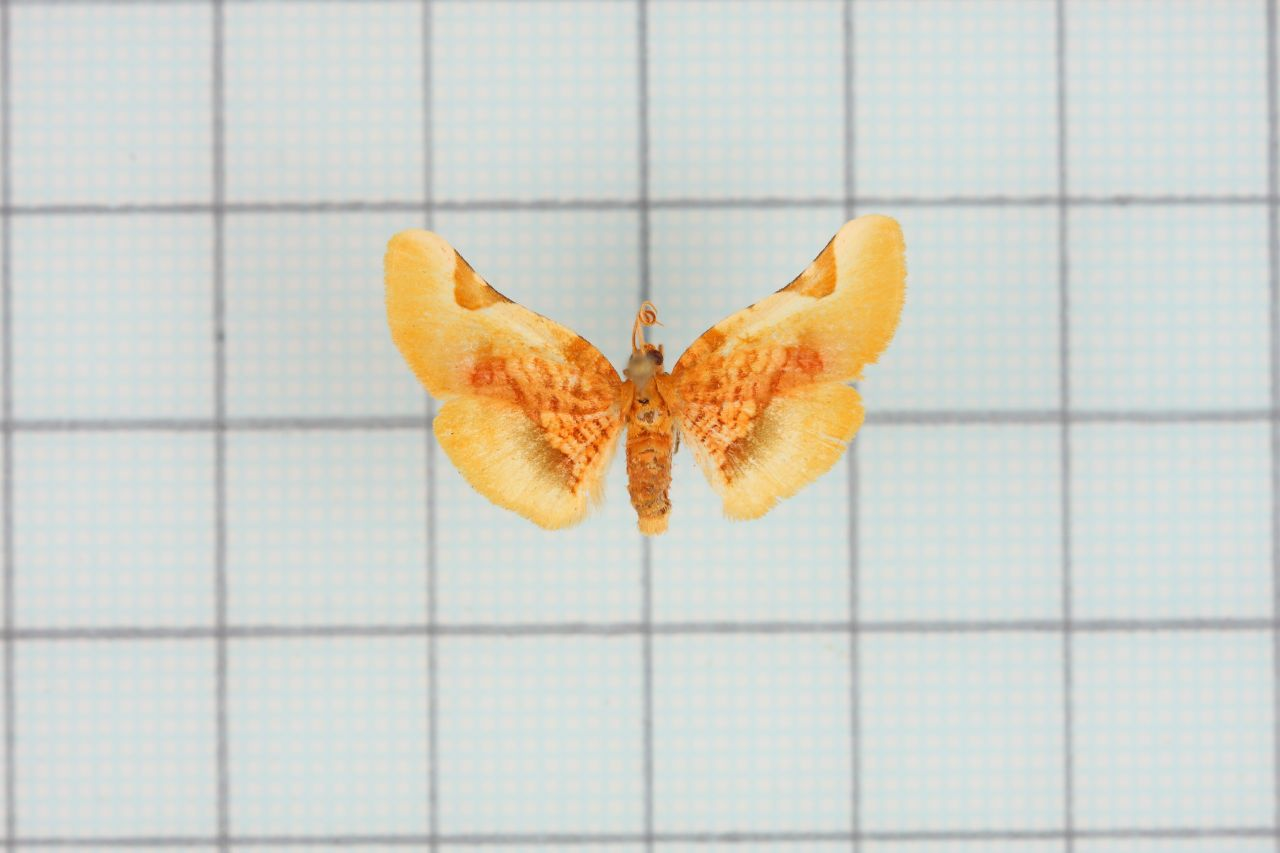
- Pyralioides sinuosus

Scientific classification
- Kingdom: Animalia
- Phylum: Arthropoda
- Class: Insecta
- Order: Lepidoptera
- Family: Thyrididae
- Genus: Pyrinioides; Butler, 1881

Synonyms
- Pyralioides

= Pyrinioides =

Genus of moths

Pyrinioides is a genus of moths of the family Thyrididae.

== Species ==
- Pyrinioides aurea Butler, 1881
- Pyrinioides flaveolus (Matsumura, 1921)
- Pyrinioides sinuosus (Warren, 1896)
