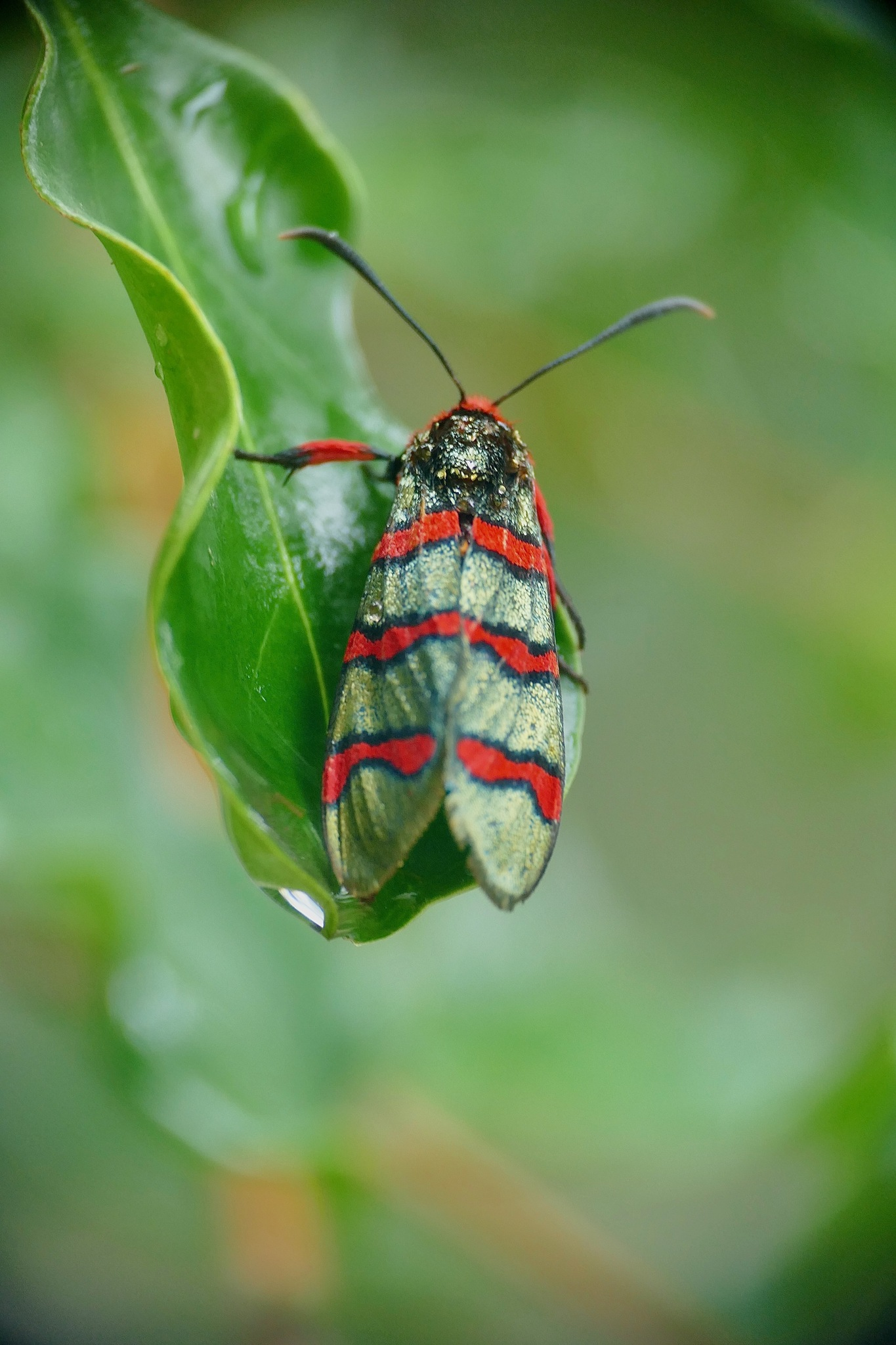
- Arniocera erythropyga, South Africa

Scientific classification
- Domain: Eukaryota
- Kingdom: Animalia
- Phylum: Arthropoda
- Class: Insecta
- Order: Lepidoptera
- Family: Thyrididae
- Genus: Arniocera; Hopffer, 1857

Synonyms
- Arichalca Wallengren, 1858

= Arniocera =

Genus of moths

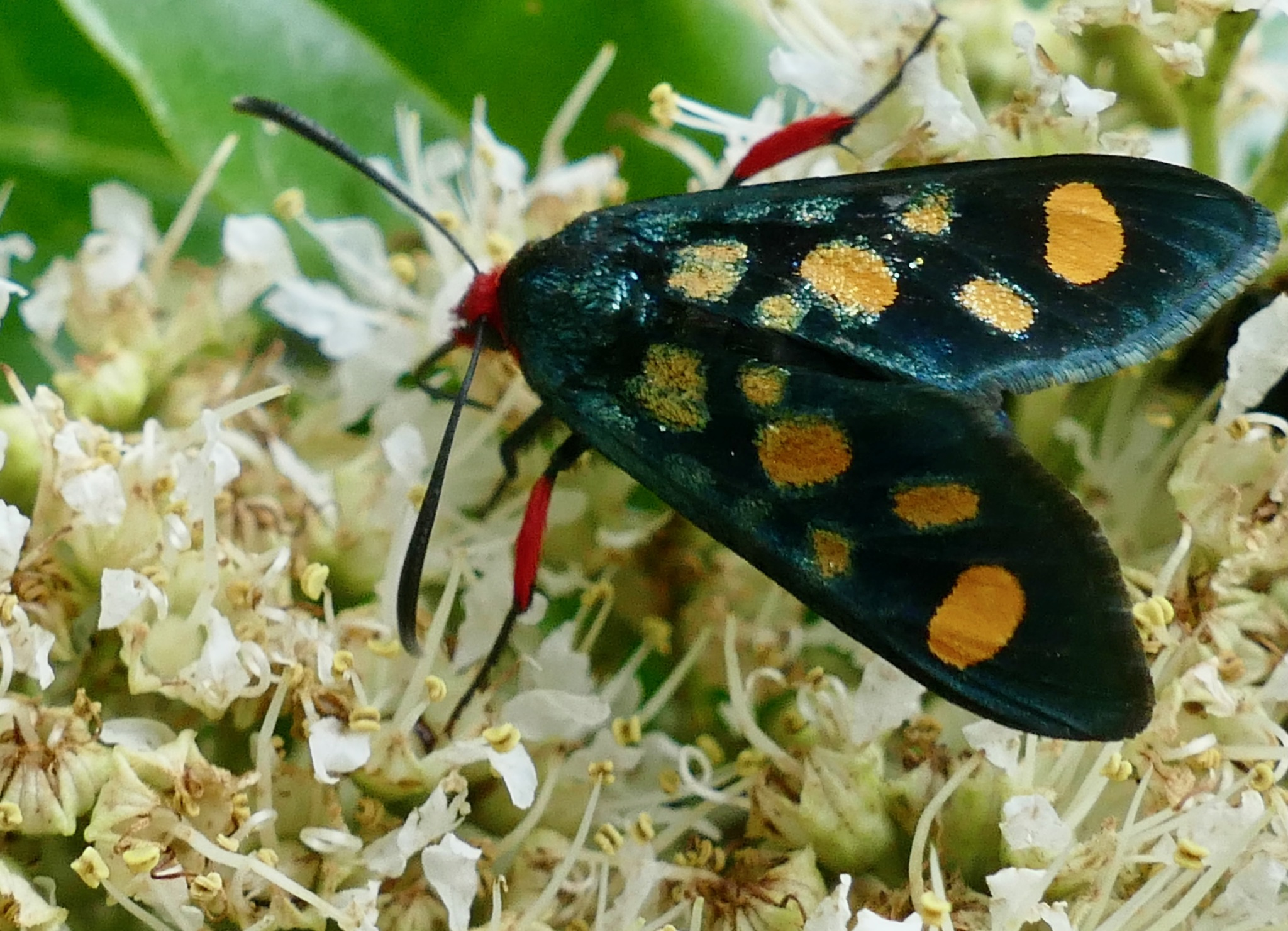
Arniocera auriguttata, South Africa

Arniocera is a genus of moths in the family Thyrididae. There are more than 20 described species in Arniocera, found in Africa.

== Species ==
These 24 species belong to the genus Arniocera:

- Arniocera albiguttata Talbot, 1928
- Arniocera amoena Jordan, 1907
- Arniocera auriguttata Hopffer, 1857
- Arniocera chalcopasta Hampson, 1910
- Arniocera chrysosticta Butler, 1898
- Arniocera collenettei Talbot, 1929
- Arniocera cyanoxantha Mabille, 1893
- Arniocera elata Jordan, 1915
- Arniocera elliptica Kiriakoff, 1954
- Arniocera ericata Butler, 1898
- Arniocera erythropyga Wallengren, 1860
- Arniocera guttulosa Jordan, 1915
- Arniocera imperialis Butler, 1898
- Arniocera inornata Kiriakoff, 1954
- Arniocera lautuscula Karsch, 1897
- Arniocera lugubris Gaede, 1926
- Arniocera meyeri Alberti, 1957
- Arniocera poecila Jordan, 1907
- Arniocera rectifascia Kiriakoff, 1954
- Arniocera schultzei Aurivillius, 1925
- Arniocera sternecki Rogenhofer, 1891
- Arniocera vanstraeleni Kiriakoff, 1954
- Arniocera viridifasciata Aurivillius, 1899
- Arniocera zambesina Walker, 1866
