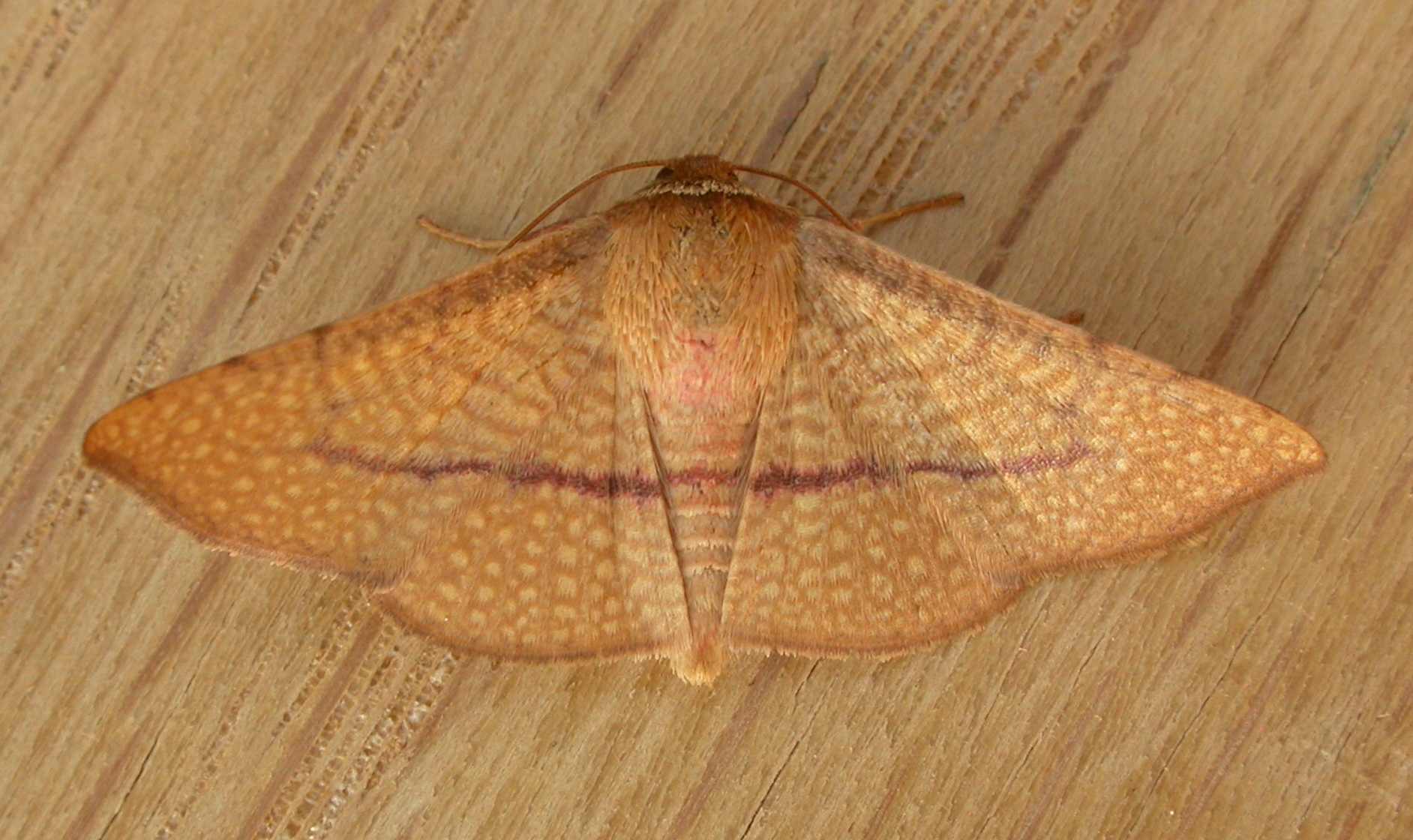
- Aglaopus pyrrhata

Scientific classification
- Kingdom: Animalia
- Phylum: Arthropoda
- Class: Insecta
- Order: Lepidoptera
- Family: Thyrididae
- Genus: Aglaopus; Turner, 1911

Synonyms
- Cydrastis Turner, 1915; Misalina Whalley, 1976

= Aglaopus =

Genus of Scirtidae

Aglaopus is a genus of moth in the Thyrididae family, first described in 1911 by Alfred Jefferis Turner. The type species is Aglaopus niphocosma.

Species of this genus are found in Australia, the islands to its north, South East Asia, and India.

== Species list ==
(listed by IRMNG)

- Aglaopus anxia Whalley, 1976
- Aglaopus carycina Turner, 1915
- Aglaopus centiginosa Lucas, 1898
- Aglaopus condensata Warren, 1907
- Aglaopus costirufata Warren, 1907
- Aglaopus decussata Moore, 1883
- Aglaopus dentifascia Warren, 1907
- Aglaopus ferocia Whalley, 1976
- Aglaopus ferruginea Whalley, 1976
- Aglaopus floccosa Warren, 1905
- Aglaopus gemmulosa Whalley, 1976
- Aglaopus glareola Felder, Felder & Rogenhofer, 1875
- Aglaopus ignefissa Warren, 1907
- Aglaopus industa Whalley, 1976
- Aglaopus innotata Warren, 1904
- Aglaopus irias Meyrick, 1887
- Aglaopus leprosa Warren, 1898
- Aglaopus metallifera Warren, 1907
- Aglaopus niphocosma Turner, 1911
- Aglaopus ochracea Warren, 1908
- Aglaopus parata Whalley, 1976
- Aglaopus pseudoscia Whalley, 1976
- Aglaopus pyrrhata Walker, 1866
- Aglaopus reversa Warren, 1899
- Aglaopus scintillans Warren, 1905
- Aglaopus sordida Pagenstecher, 1892
- Aglaopus stramentaria Lucas, 1898
- Aglaopus suffusa Leech, 1898
- Aglaopus whalleyi Konvicka, Spitzer & Jaros, 1998
- Aglaopus xanthoscia Warren, 1903
