= Banisia lobata =

Scientific classification
- Kingdom: Animalia
- Phylum: Arthropoda
- Clade: Pancrustacea
- Class: Insecta
- Order: Lepidoptera
- Family: Thyrididae
- Genus: Banisia
- Species: B. lobata

Binomial name
- Banisia lobata Moore, 1882

Species of moth

Banisia lobata is a moth of the family Thyrididae first described by Frederic Moore in 1882. It is found in India, Sri Lanka, Malaysia, China, Singapore, Hong Kong and Brunei.

Both wings are fawn colored. Several small dark spots are found on both wings. About three white spots can be found near the cell of the forewings.

Two subspecies are recognized.

- Banisia lobata caesia Whalley, 1976
- Banisia lobata ceylonensis Whalley, 1976
