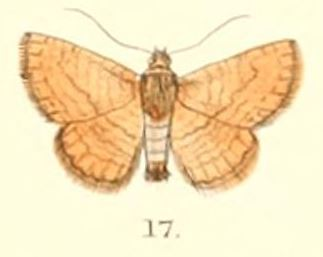
- Striglina strigosa

Scientific classification
- Kingdom: Animalia
- Phylum: Arthropoda
- Class: Insecta
- Order: Lepidoptera
- Family: Thyrididae
- Genus: Striglina; Guenée, 1877

Synonyms
- Daristane Walker, 1859; Heteroschista Warren, 1903; Plagiosella Hampson, 1897; Plagiosellula Strand, 1913; Pycnopera Warren, 1898

= Striglina =

Genus of moths

Striglina is a genus of moths of the family Thyrididae described by Achille Guenée in 1877.

== Description ==
Palpi upturned and thickly scaled. The third joint short. Antennae minutely ciliate in male, simple in female. Femora and tibia hairy. Forewing with veins 8 and 9 from cell, veins 9 and 10 from some way before the angle. Hindwing with vein 5 from just above lower angle of cell.

== Species ==
- Striglina asinina Warren, 1899
- Striglina augescere Whalley, 1971
- Striglina bifida Chu & Wang, 1991
- Striglina buergersi Gaede, 1922 (from Papua New Guinea)
- Striglina cinnamomea (Rothschild, 1915)
- Striglina clathrata (Hampson, 1897)
- Striglina crassisquama (Warren, 1898)
- Striglina eguttalis Gaede, 1917
- Striglina ferula Whalley, 1971
- Striglina guttistigma Hampson, 1906
- Striglina indistincta Gaede, 1922 (from Papua New Guinea)
- Striglina jacanda Whalley, 1971
- Striglina lineola Guenée, 1877
- Striglina meridiana Whalley, 1976
- Striglina minutula (Saalmuller, 1880)
- Striglina navigatorum (Felder & Rogenhofer, 1874)
- Striglina nigranalis (Warren, 1903)
- Striglina pararubricans Chen, Zhan & Wang, 2024
- Striglina propatula Whalley, 1974
- Striglina ramosa Whalley, 1971
- Striglina rothi Warren, 1898
- Striglina roseus Gaede 1932
- Striglina rufuscens Gaede, 1922 ( from Assam)
- Striglina scitaria (Walker, 1862)
- Striglina strigifera (Strand, 1913)
- Striglina strigosa (Moore, 1882) (from India)
- Striglina suzukii Matsumura, 1921 (from Japan)
- Striglina tibiaria (Walker, 1859)
- Striglina tincta Whalley, 1971
- Striglina trepida Whalley, 1971
- Striglina venia Whalley, 1976
- Striglina whalleyi Chen, Zhan & Wang, 2024
