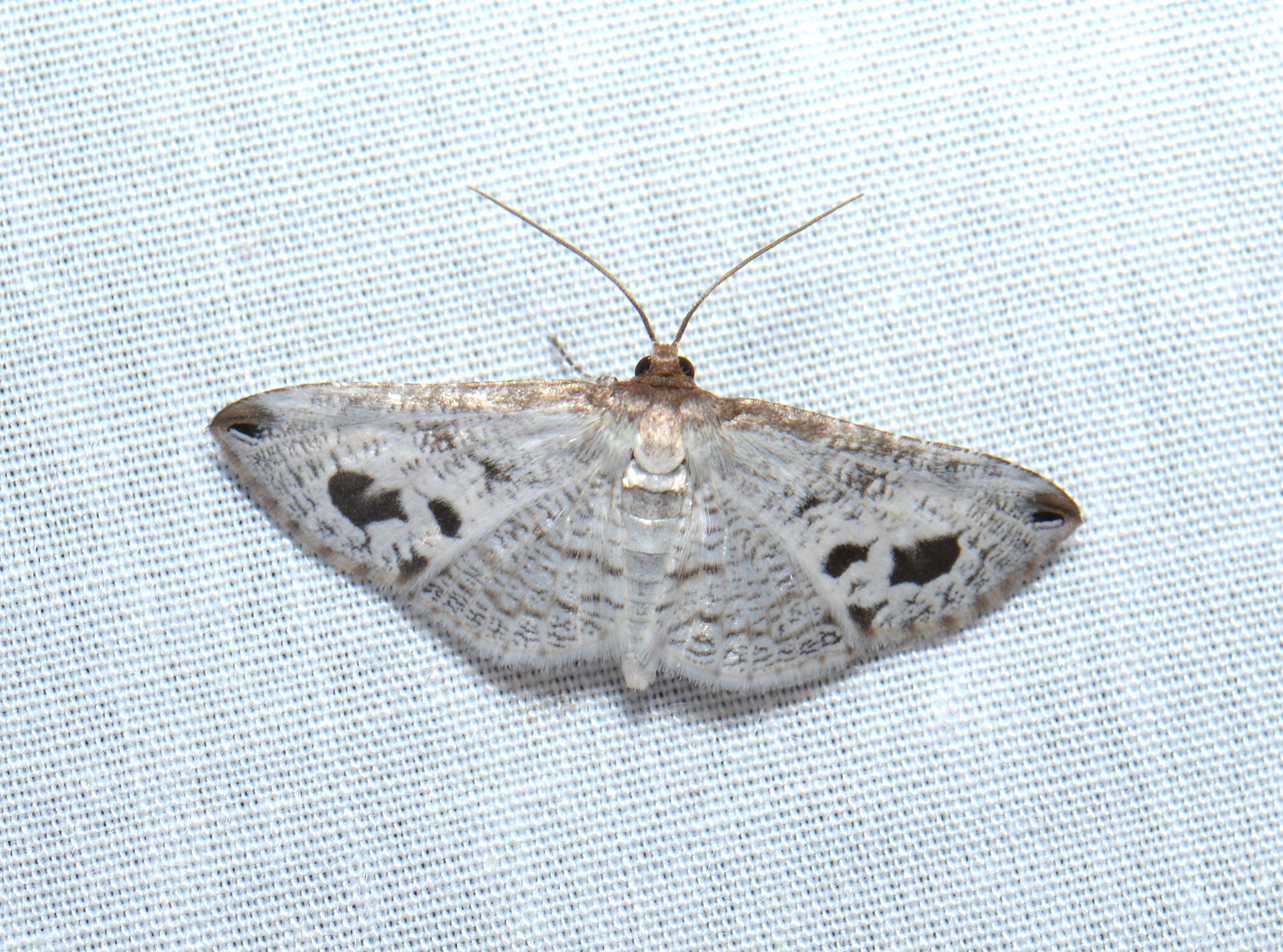
- Calindoea sp.

Scientific classification
- Kingdom: Animalia
- Phylum: Arthropoda
- Class: Insecta
- Order: Lepidoptera
- Family: Thyrididae
- Genus: Calindoea; Walker, 1863

= Calindoea =

Genus of insects

Calindoea is a genus of moths belonging to the family Thyrididae.

The species of this genus are found in Southeastern Asia.

Species:

- Calindoea acutipennis Pagenstecher, 1886
- Calindoea atripunctalis
- Calindoea cumulalis Walker, 1863
- Calindoea dorilusalis Walker, 1859
