= Novobelura =

Scientific classification
- Kingdom: Animalia
- Phylum: Arthropoda
- Clade: Pancrustacea
- Class: Insecta
- Order: Lepidoptera
- Family: Thyrididae
- Subfamily: Siculodinae
- Tribe: Siculodini
- Genus: Novobelura; Shaffer & Nielsen, 1996
- Species: N. dohertyi

Binomial name
- Novobelura dohertyi (Warren, 1897)

Synonyms
- Banisia longistriata Warren, 1907; Banisia nigriflexa Warren, 1905; Rhodoneura stenosoma Hampson, 1897

Type of moth in the Thyrididae

Novobelura dohertyi is a moth of the family Thyrididae first described by Warren in 1897. It is the only species in the genus Novobelura. It is found in Sri Lanka and Malaysia.
