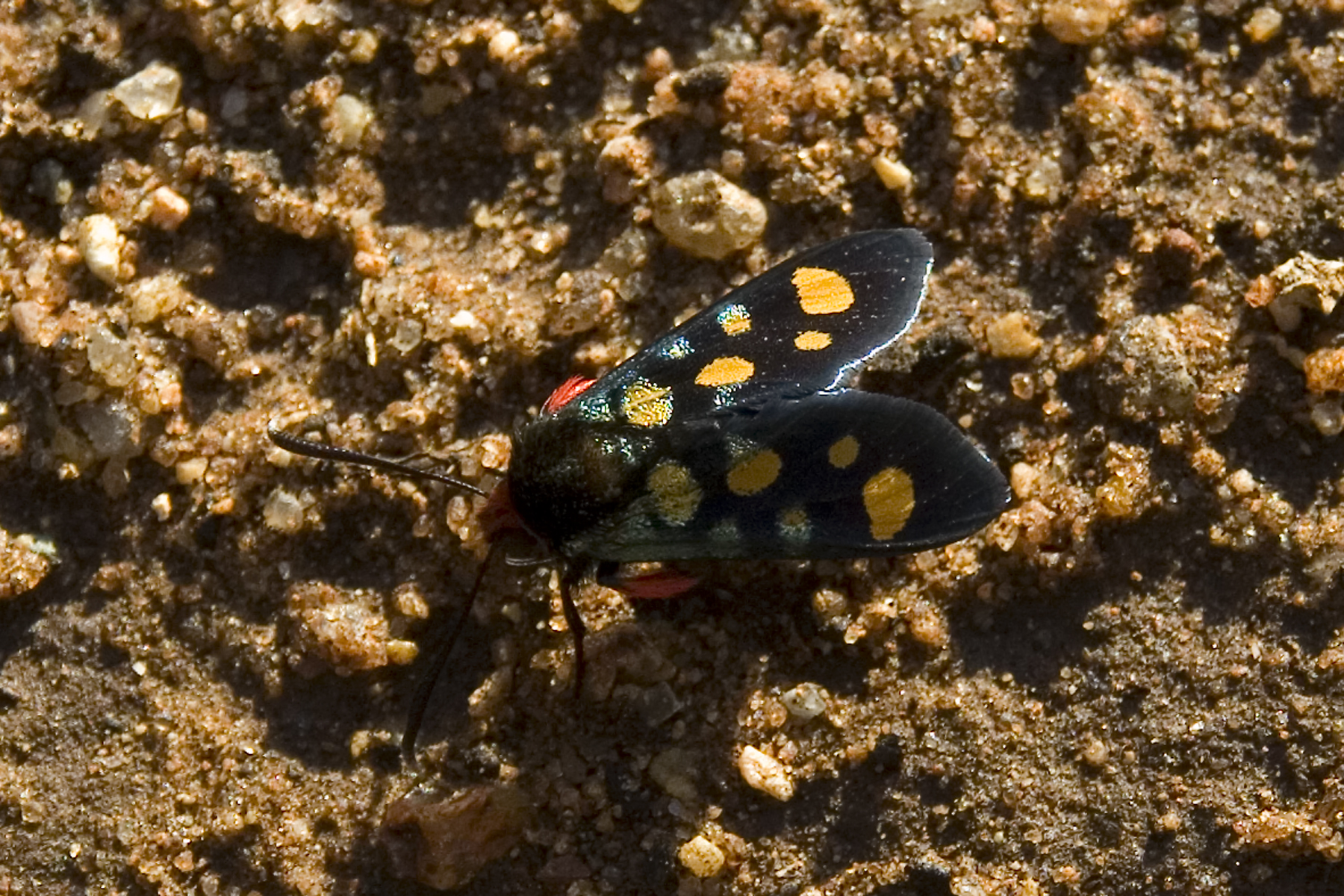
- Arniocera auriguttata
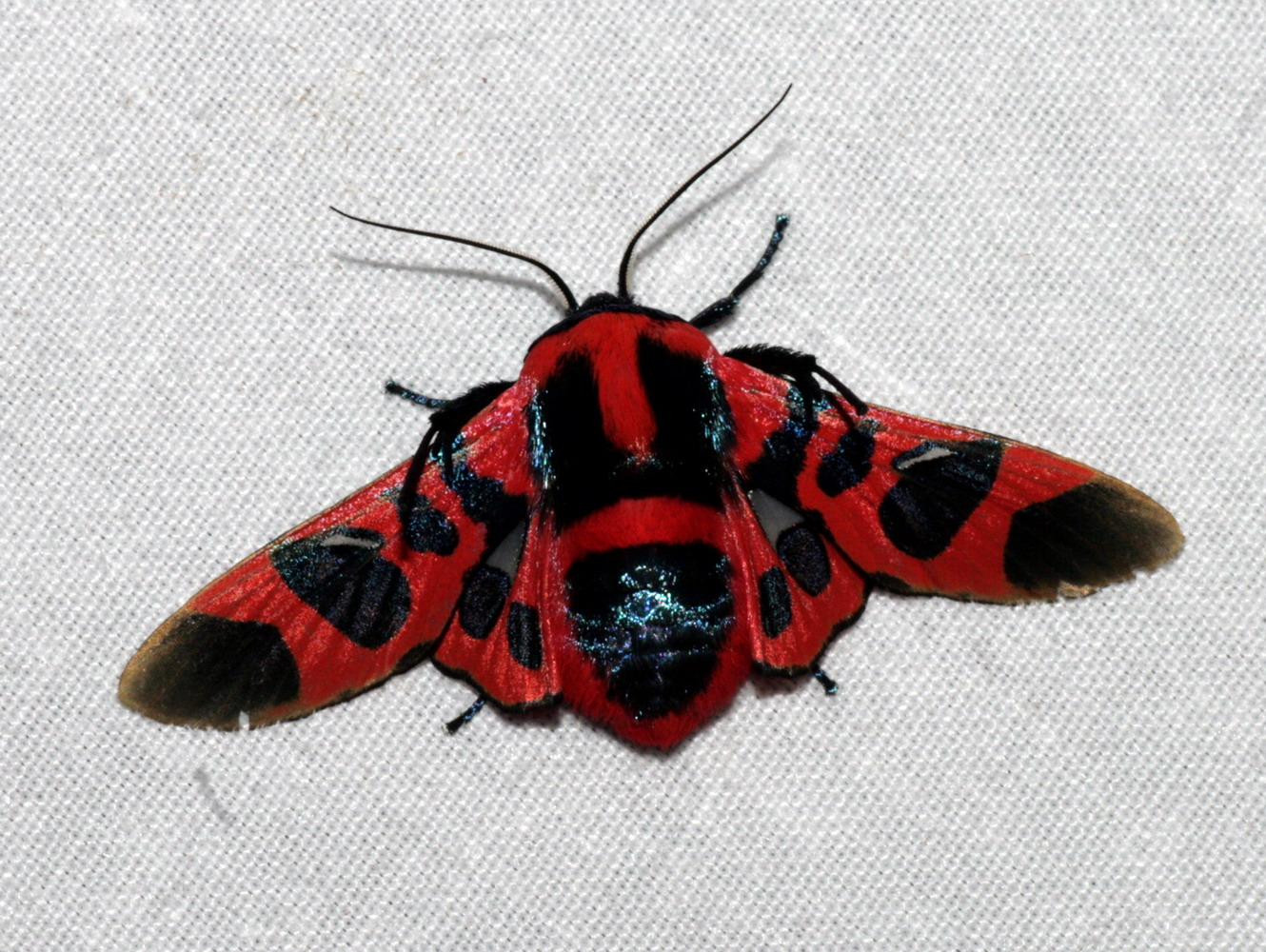
- Glanycus coendersi, one of the aposematically coloured day-flying species of Thyrididae

Scientific classification
- Kingdom: Animalia
- Phylum: Arthropoda
- Clade: Pancrustacea
- Class: Insecta
- Order: Lepidoptera
- Clade: Eulepidoptera
- Clade: Ditrysia
- Clade: Apoditrysia
- Clade: Obtectomera
- Superfamily: Thyridoidea; Herrich-Schäffer, 1846
- Family: Thyrididae; Herrich-Schäffer, 1846

Subfamilies
- Charideinae; Siculodinae; Striglininae; Thyridinae

Diversity
- Over 1,000 species

= Thyrididae =

Family of moths

The Thyrididae comprise the family of picture-winged leaf moths. They are the only family in the superfamily Thyridoidea, which sometimes has been included in the Pyraloidea, but this is not supported by cladistic analysis.

Most species live in the tropics and subtropics. They are colourful and often day-flying moths. There are four subfamilies. Their biology is little known. Thyridid specimens are rare in museum collections.

== Genera ==
- Chrysotypus Butler, 1879
- Dixoa Hampson, 1893
- Microctenucha Warren, 1900
- Aglaopus Turner, 1911

=== Charideinae ===
- Amalthocera Boisduval, 1836
- Arniocera Hopffer, 1857
- Byblisia Walker, 1865
- Cicinnocnemis Holland, 1894
- Dilophura Hampson, 1918
- Lamprochrysa Hampson, 1918
- Marmax Rafinesque, 1815
- Netrocera Felder, 1874
- Toosa Walker, 1856
- Trichobaptes Holland, 1894

=== Siculodinae ===
- Belonoptera Herrich-Schäffer, [1858]
- Bupota Whalley, 1971
- Calindoea Walker, 1863
- Cecidothyris Aurivillius, 1910
- Collinsa Whalley, 1964
- Cornuterus Whalley, 1971
- Draconia Hübner, 1820
- Epaena Karsch, 1900
- Gnathodes Whalley, 1971
- Hapana Whalley, 1967
- Hypolamprus Hampson, 1892
- Kalenga Whalley, 1971
- Kuja Whalley, 1971
- Lelymena Karsch, 1900
- Morova Walker, 1865
- Nakawa Whalley, 1971
- Nemea Whalley, 1971
- Novobelura Shaffer & Nielsen, 1996
- Opula Walker, 1869
- Pyrinioides Butler, 1881
- Rhodoneura Guenée, 1858
- Siculodes Guenée, 1858
- Symphleps Warren, 1897
- Tridesmodes Warren, 1899
- Zeuzerodes Pagenstecher, 1892

=== Striglininae ===
- Banisia Walker, 1863
- Jamboina Whalley, 1976
- Macrogonia Herrich-Schäffer, 1855
- Mathoris Guenée, 1877
- Monodecus Whalley, 1976
- Mystina Whalley, 1976
- Rhodogonia Warren, 1897
- Speculina Whalley, 1976
- Striglina Guneée, 1877
- Tanyodes Möschler, 1882
- Tristina Whalley, 1976

=== Thyridinae ===
- Dysodia Clemens, 1860 (includes Platythyris)
- Glanycus Walker, 1855
- Pseudothyris Guérin-Méneville, 1832
- Sijua Whalley, 1971
- Thyris Laspeyrés, 1803
