= List of moths of India (Oecophoridae) =

This is a list of moths of the family Oecophoridae that are found in India. It also acts as an index to the species articles and forms part of the full List of moths of India.

- Acria ceramitis Meyrick, 1908
- Acria emarginella (Donovan, 1804)
- Psorosticha zizyphi (Stainton, 1859)
- Tonica niviferana (Walker, 1864)
