= List of moths of India (Thyrididae) =

This is an (incomplete) list of moths of the family of Thyrididae that are found in India. It also acts as an index to the species articles and forms part of the full List of moths of India.

- Addaea trimeronalis Walker, 1859
- Aglaopus glareola Felder, Felder & Rogenhofer, 1875
- Banisia myrsusalis (Walker, 1895)
- Banisia myrtaea (Drury, 1773)
- Calindoea trifascialis Moore
- Collinsa acutalis (Walker, 1866)
- Dysodia ignita (Walker, 1858)
- Dysodia viridatrix (Walker, 1858)
- Glanycus coendersi Kalis
- Herdonia osacesalis Walker, 1859
- Hapana carcealis Whalley, 1971
- Hypolamprus emblicalis Moore, 1888
- Hypolamprus trifascialis Moore
- Mathoris loceusalis (Walker 1859)
- Mathoris thyralis (Walker 1866)
- Microbelia intimalis Moore, 1888
- Microctenucha munda (Hampson 1893)
- Picrostomastis subrosealis (Leech, 1889)
- Rhodoneura bracteata Hampson
- Rhodoneura recticulatis Moore
- Rhodoneura spendida Butler
- Rhodoneura uniformis Hampson
- Striglina lineola Guenée, 1877
- Striglina scitaria (Walker, 1863)
- Striglina strigosa (Moore, 1882)

== See also ==
- List of moths of India
