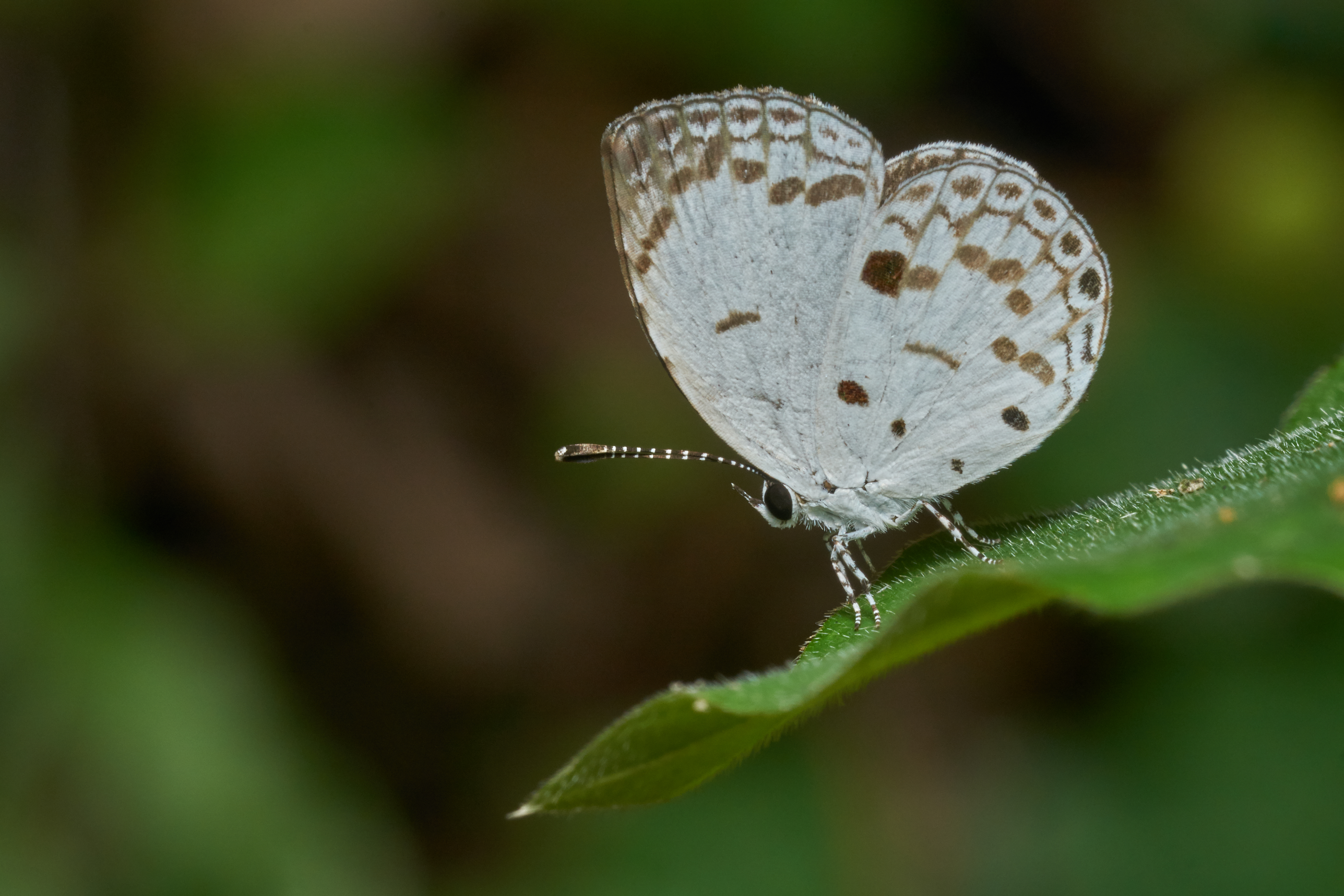

Scientific classification
- Domain: Eukaryota
- Kingdom: Animalia
- Phylum: Arthropoda
- Class: Insecta
- Order: Lepidoptera
- Family: Lycaenidae
- Genus: Neopithecops
- Species: N. zalmora

Binomial name
- Neopithecops zalmora (Butler, [1870])

= Neopithecops zalmora =

Quaker

Species of butterfly

Neopithecops zalmora, the Quaker, is a small butterfly found in South Asia and Southeast Asia that belongs to the lycaenids or blues family.

== Subspecies ==
The subspecies of Neopithecops zalmora are-

- Neopithecops zalmora zalmora Butler, 1870 – north-east India, Myanmar
- Neopithecops zalmora dharma Moore, 1881 – Sri Lanka, south India
- Neopithecops zalmora andamanus Eliot & Kawazoé, 1983 – Andamans

== Description ==
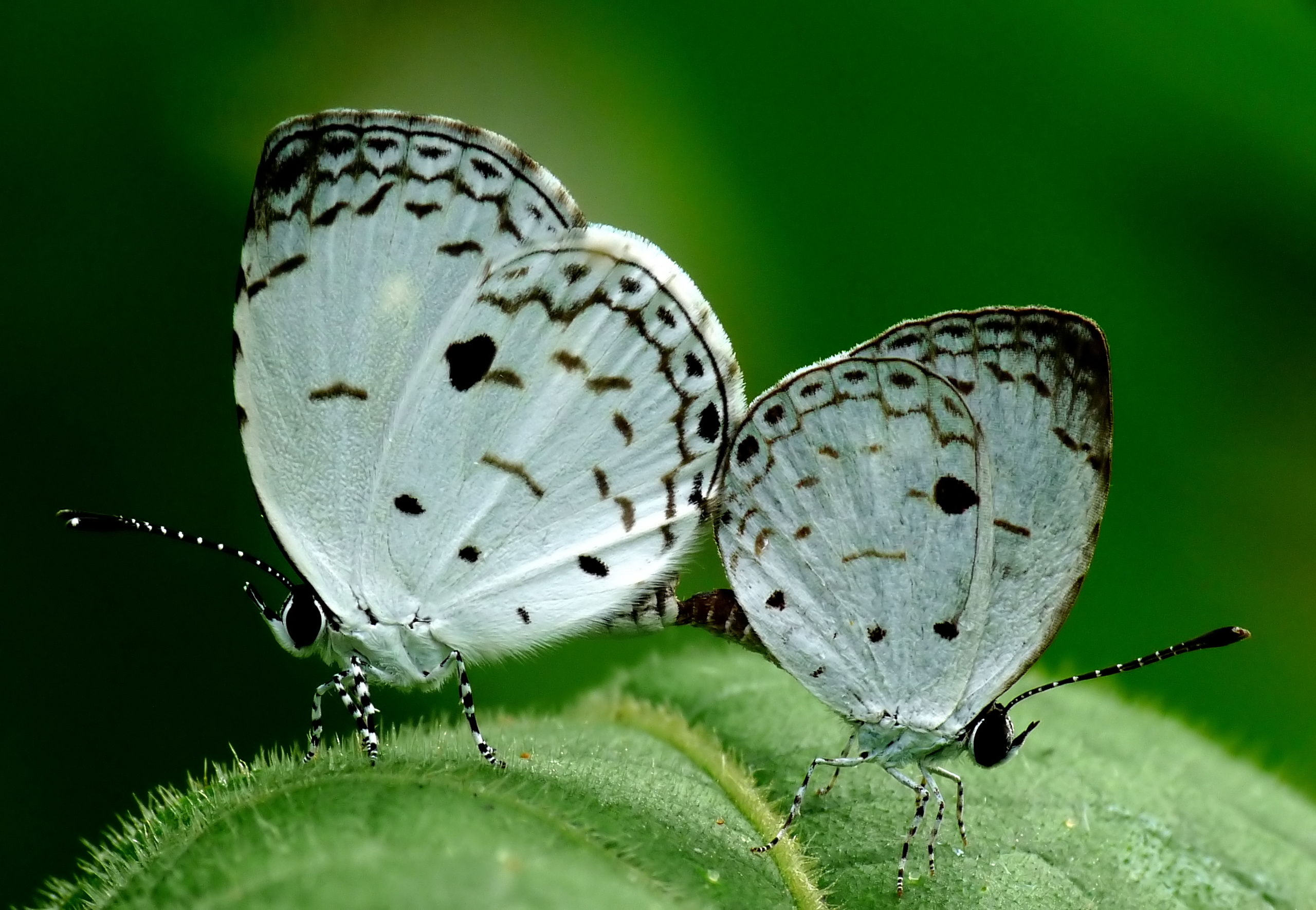
Mating pair

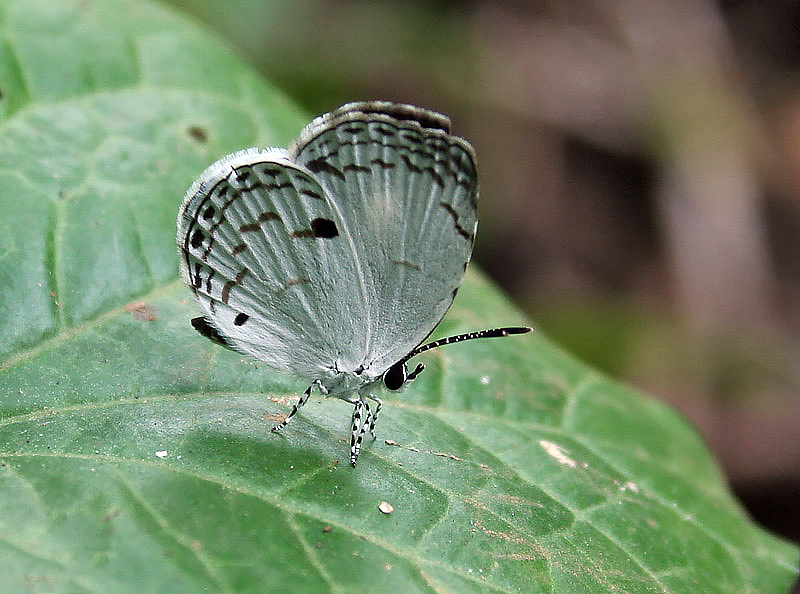
Wet-season form Narendrapur, near Kolkata, India

=== Wet-season form ===
Upperside of both sexes dark purplish brown; in the female slightly paler on the disc of the forewing. In most specimens, but not in all, the male also has the disc of the forewing similarly paler. Underside; white. Forewing: apex dusky brown, apices of veins 10, 11 and 12 with a minute black dot; no discal markings, but the discocellulars picked out with a short, very slender, obscure brown line; a postdiscal, irregular, transverse series of slender brown lunules, followed by a transverse, very slender, sinuous brown line, the white ground colour in the interspaces beyond centred by a subterminal series of transverse black spots.

Hindwing: discocellulars with a short brown line similar to that on the forewing, followed by a subdorsal small round black spot, and a subcostal much larger similar spot; between these two spots is a curved, very irregular line of detached pale ashy-brown lunules; the subterminal markings very similar to those on the forewing. Cilia of forewing dusky brown, of hindwing white. Antenna, head, thorax and abdomen dark brown; the antenna on the inner side speckled with white; beneath; the palpi, thorax and abdomen white.

=== Dry-season form ===
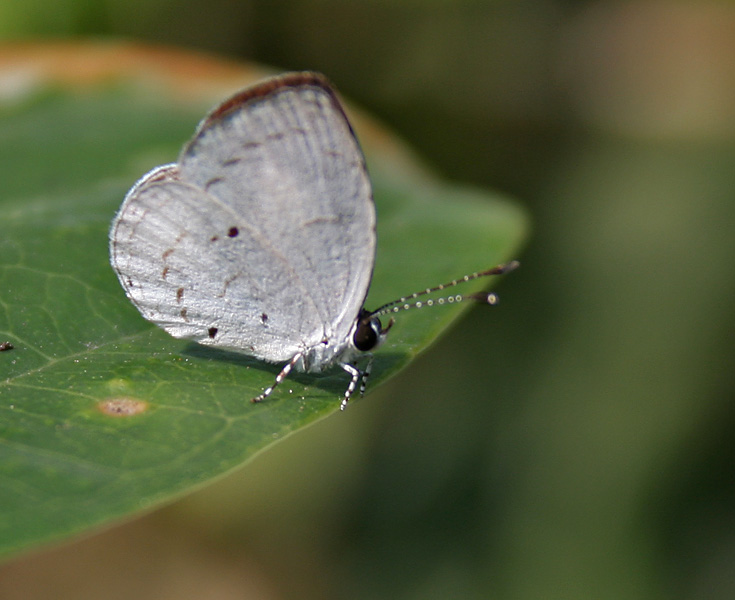
Dry-season form at Narendrapur near Kolkata, West Bengal, India

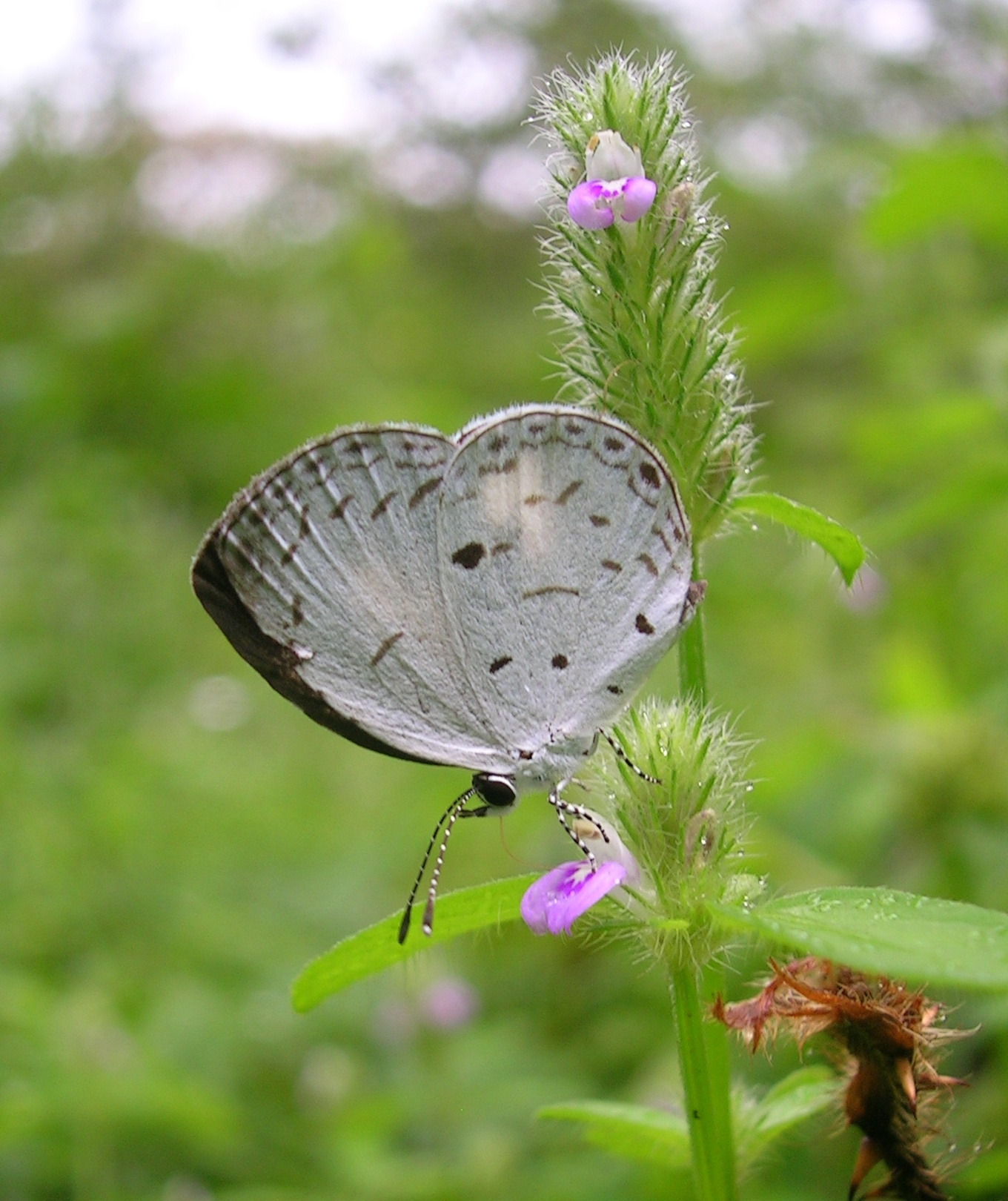
From Wayanad

Differs from specimens of the wet-season brood as follows:

Upperside: ground colour not so dark generally. Forewing: a large oval snow-white spot placed obliquely on the disc. Hindwing: apex and disc irregularly white; on the posterior half the ground colour a shade darker than on the anterior half.

Underside: ground colour and markings similar to those of specimens of the wet-season brood, but the markings very much paler and fainter; in specimens taken in the middle of the dry season in exceptionally dry localities these markings are altogether absent. Antennae, head, thorax and abdomen on the upperside paler than in the wet-season brood.

== Distribution ==
India: Eastern Himalayas; Bengal: Orissa; Western Ghats; Sri Lanka; Assam; Myanmar; Tenasserim; the Andamans; extending into the Malay Peninsula.

== Food plants ==
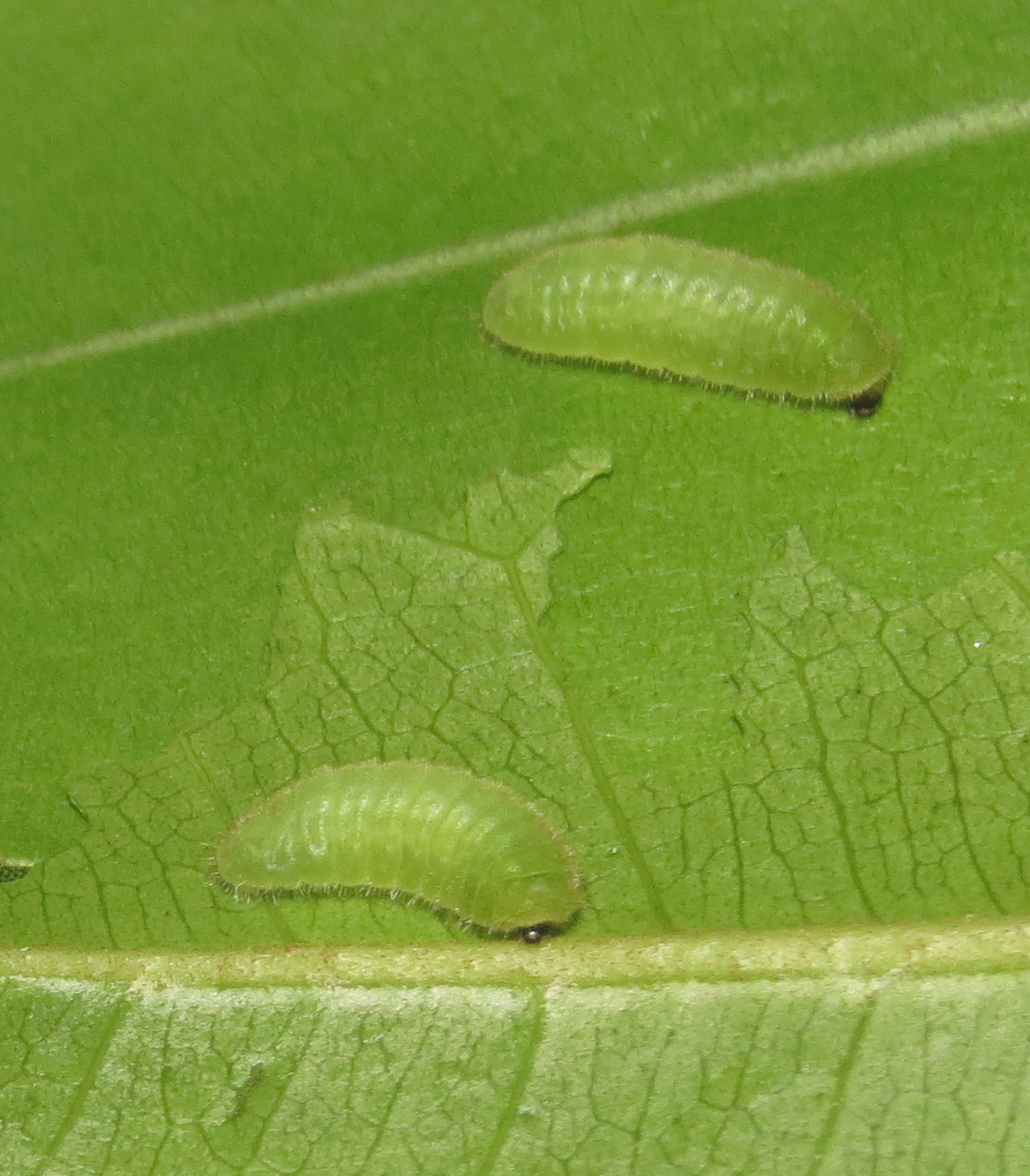
Caterpillar

The larvae are known to feed on Diospyros (Ebenaceae) and many species of Glycosmis (Rutaceae) including G. arborea, G. parviflora and G. pentaphylla.

== Gallery ==
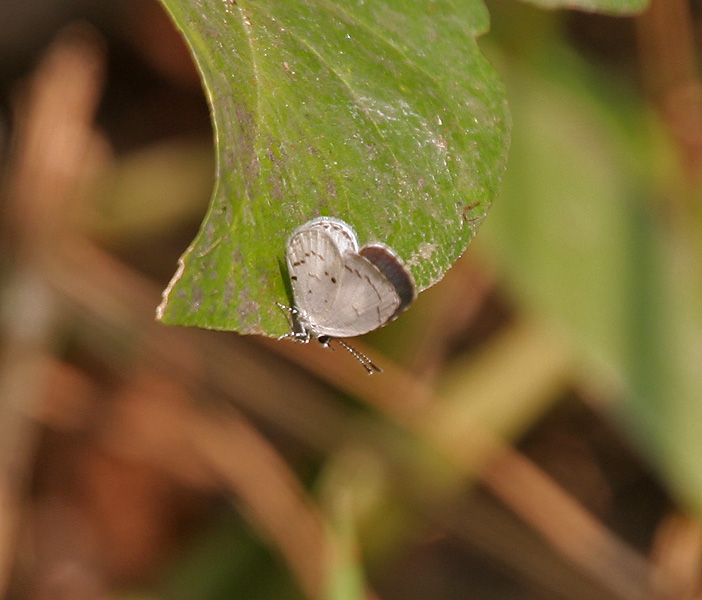
Dry-season form at Narendrapur near Kolkata, West Bengal, India

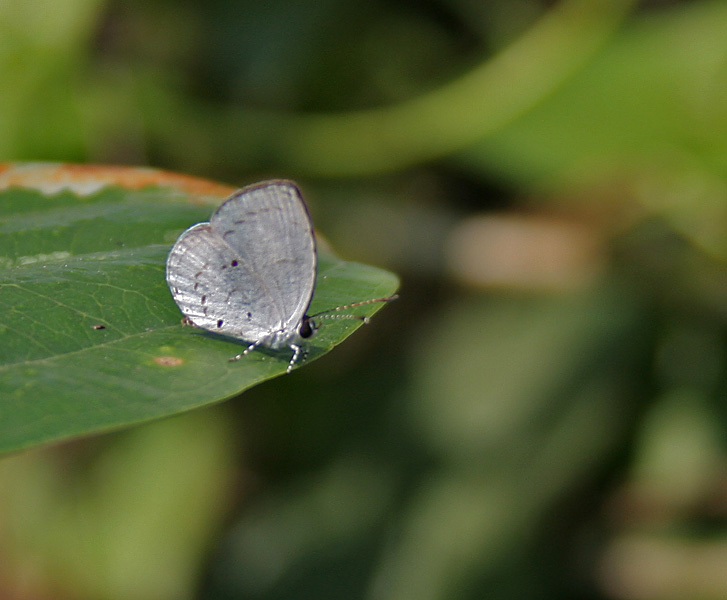
Dry-season form at Narendrapur near Kolkata, West Bengal

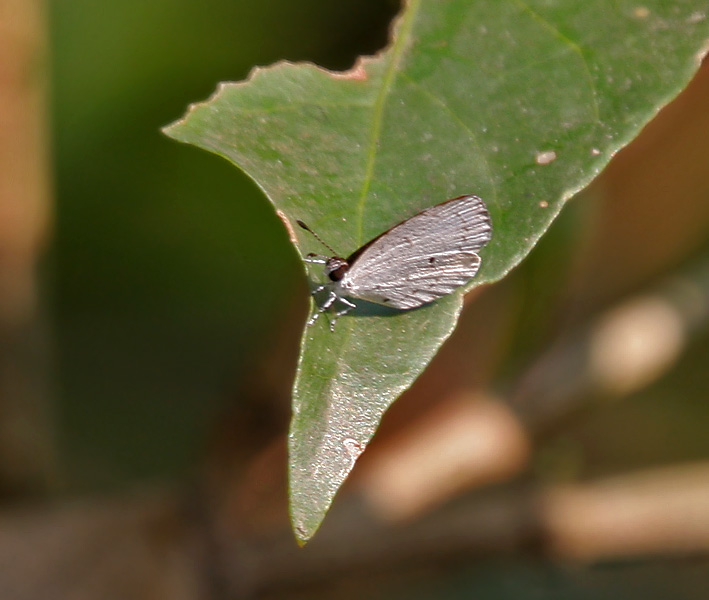
Dry-season form at Narendrapur near Kolkata, West Bengal

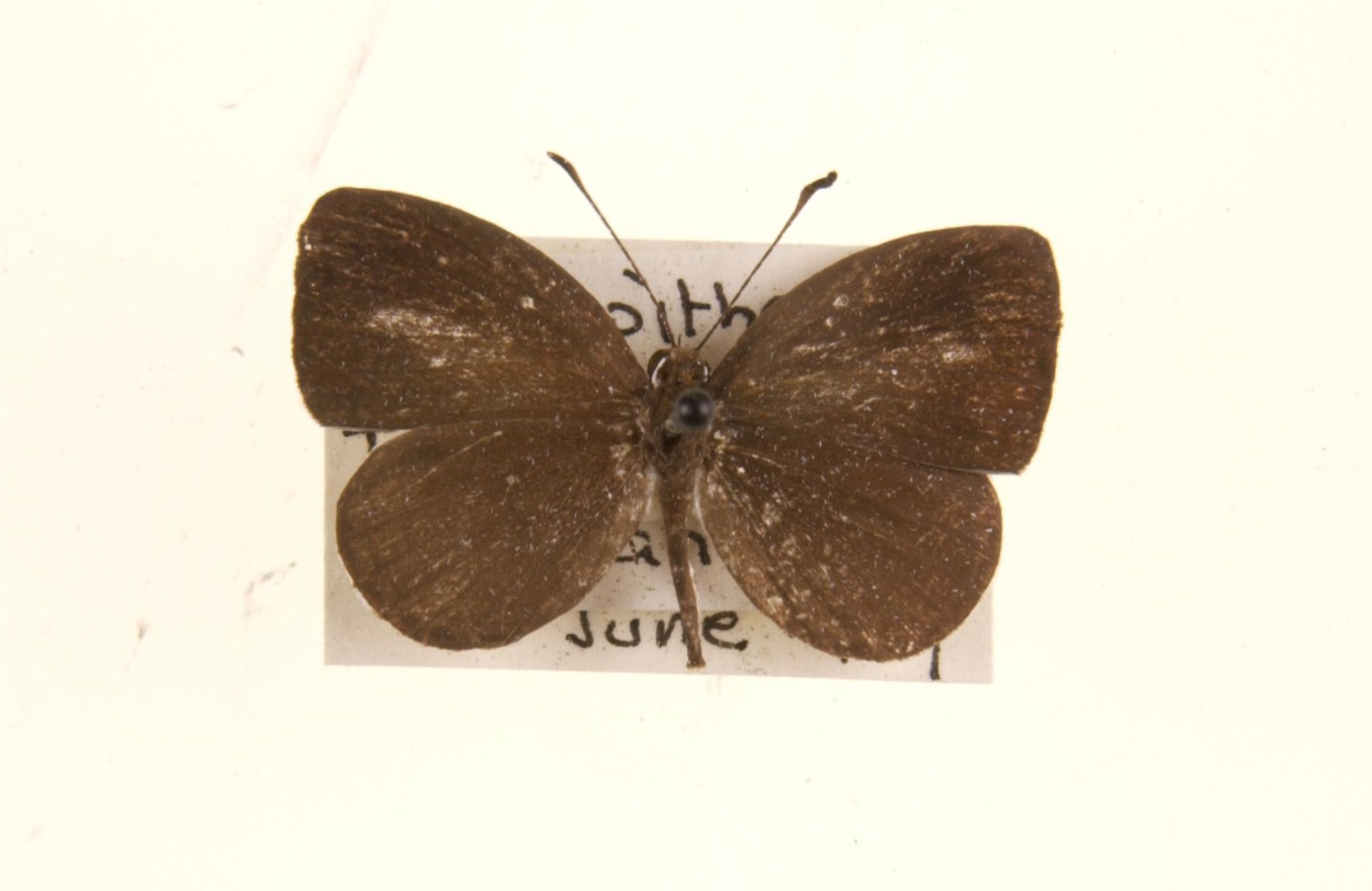
Upperside in Malaya

== See also ==
- List of butterflies of India (Lycaenidae)
