= G. pentaphylla =

G. pentaphylla may refer to:

- Geissois pentaphylla, a plant endemic to Vanikoro, Solomon Islands
- Glycosmis pentaphylla, a plant with edible fruit
- Gymnogonia pentaphylla, an annual wildflower
- Gynostemma pentaphylla, a climbing vine
