= Glycosmis longisepala =

Conservation status
- Vulnerable (IUCN 3.1)

Scientific classification
- Kingdom: Plantae
- Clade: Embryophytes
- Clade: Tracheophytes
- Clade: Spermatophytes
- Clade: Angiosperms
- Clade: Eudicots
- Clade: Rosids
- Order: Sapindales
- Family: Rutaceae
- Genus: Glycosmis
- Species: G. longisepala

Binomial name
- Glycosmis longisepala B.C.Stone

Species of tree

Glycosmis longisepala is a tree of Borneo in the family Rutaceae. The specific epithet longisepala is from the Latin meaning "long sepal".

== Description ==
Glycosmis longisepala grows as a small tree. The leaves measure up to 30 centimetres (12 in) long. The inflorescences measure up to 13 cm (5 in) long. The subellipsoid fruits measure up to 0.75 cm (0.3 in) long.

== Distribution and habitat ==
Glycosmis longisepala is endemic to Borneo where it is confined to Mount Pueh in Sarawak. Its habitat is forests at around 1,000 m (3,300 ft) elevation.
