= Glycosmis cyanocarpa =

Conservation status
- Least Concern (IUCN 3.1)

Scientific classification
- Kingdom: Plantae
- Clade: Embryophytes
- Clade: Tracheophytes
- Clade: Spermatophytes
- Clade: Angiosperms
- Clade: Eudicots
- Clade: Rosids
- Order: Sapindales
- Family: Rutaceae
- Genus: Glycosmis
- Species: G. cyanocarpa

Binomial name
- Glycosmis cyanocarpa (Blume) Spreng.

Synonyms
- Cookia cyanocarpa Blume; Dioxippe cyanocarpa (Blume) M.Roem.

Species of plant

Glycosmis cyanocarpa is a plant in the family Rutaceae. It is native to mainland and maritime Southeast Asia and Sri Lanka.

== Description ==
Glycosmis cyanocarpa grows as a shrub or tree up to 15 m (50 ft) tall, with a trunk diameter to 30 cm (12 in). The leaves are lanceolate or elliptic and measure up to 30 cm (12 in) long. The inflorescences are in corymbs. The fruits are purple and measure up to 1.5 cm (0.6 in) long.

== Taxonomy ==
Glycosmis cyanocarpa was first formally described as Cookia cyanocarpa in 1825 by botanist Carl Ludwig Blume in Bijdragen tot de flora van Nederlandsch Indië (Contributions to the Flora of the Dutch East Indies). In 1827, Curt Polycarp Joachim Sprengel transferred the species to the genus Glycosmis. The specific epithet cyanocarpa means 'cyan-coloured fruit'.

== Varieties ==
The following varieties of Glycosmis cyanocarpa are recognised:

- Glycosmis cyanocarpa var. cyanocarpa – Borneo, Java, Sumatra
- Glycosmis cyanocarpa var. erythrocarpoides B.C.Stone – Sumatra
- Glycosmis cyanocarpa var. larsenii B.C.Stone – Thailand
- Glycosmis cyanocarpa var. linearifoliola V.Naray. ex Tanaka – Assam
- Glycosmis cyanocarpa var. philippinensis B.C.Stone – Philippines
- Glycosmis cyanocarpa var. platyphylla (Merr.) B.C.Stone – Borneo, Philippines, Sulawesi
- Glycosmis cyanocarpa var. rubiginosa (Ridl.) B.C.Stone – Sumatra
- Glycosmis cyanocarpa var. simplicifolia Kurz
- Glycosmis cyanocarpa var. wirawanii B.C.Stone – Flores

== Distribution and habitat ==
Glycosmis cyanocarpa is native to Sri Lanka, Myanmar, Thailand and maritime Southeast Asia. China is sometimes included in the species' distribution. Its habitat is in lowland forests.

== Conservation ==
Glycosmis cyanocarpa has been assessed as least concern on the IUCN Red List. It is threatened by deforestation and by conversion of its habitat for agricultural and urban development. The species is found in a number of protected areas across its distribution. In Sri Lanka Glycosmis cyanocarpa is considered endangered.
