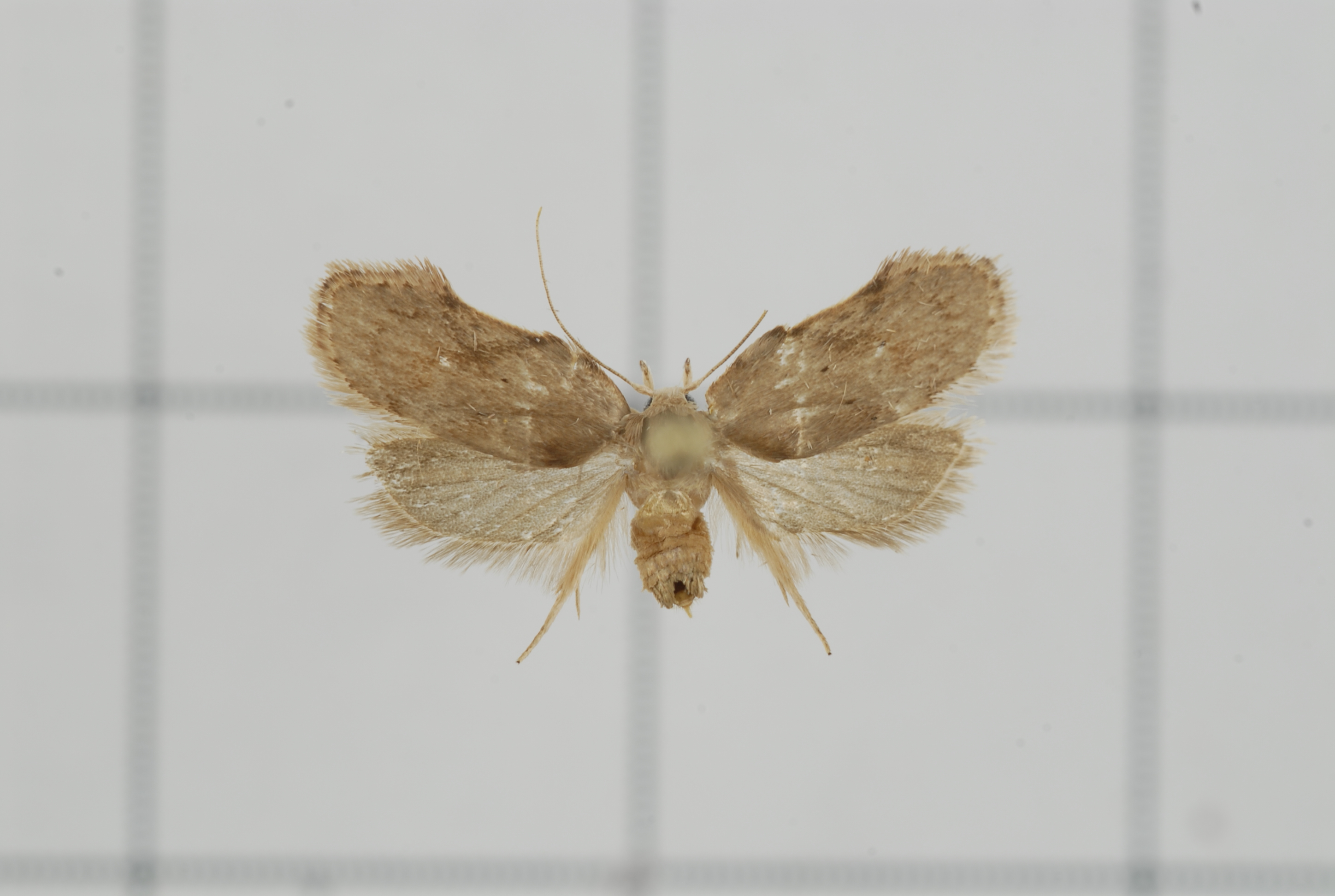
- Acria sp.

Scientific classification
- Kingdom: Animalia
- Phylum: Arthropoda
- Clade: Pancrustacea
- Class: Insecta
- Order: Lepidoptera
- Family: Depressariidae
- Subfamily: Acriinae
- Genus: Acria; Stephens, 1834

Type species
- Phalaena emarginella Donovan, 1806

Synonyms
- Tisdra Walker, 1864; Amphoritis Meyrick, 1905

= Acria =

Moth genus of superfamily Gelechioidea

Acria is a moth genus of the superfamily Gelechioidea. It is placed in the family Depressariidae, which is often – particularly in older treatments – considered a subfamily of Oecophoridae or included in the Elachistidae.

== Species ==
- Acria amphorodes (Meyrick, 1923) (India)
- Acria ceramitis Meyrick, 1908 (China, India, Korea, Japan)
- Acria cocophaga Chen & Wu, 2011
- Acria emarginella (Donovan, 1804) (China, India, Japan, Sri Lanka)
- Acria equibicruris Wang, 2008 (China)
- Acria eulectra Meyrick, 1908 (India)
- Acria gossypiella (Shiraki, 1913)
- Acria javanica Lvovsky, 2015
- Acria malacolectra Meyrick, 1930
- Acria meyricki Shashank, 2014 (India)
- Acria nivalis Wang & Li, 2000 (China)
- Acria obtusella (Walker, 1864) (Borneo, Sri Lanka)
- Acria ornithorrhyncha Wang, 2008 (China)
- Acria psamatholeuca Meyrick, 1930
- Acria sciogramma Meyrick, 1915 (New Guinea)
- Acria sulawesica Lvovsky, 2015
- Acria xanthosaris Meyrick, 1908 (India)
