= Glycosmis decipiens =

Conservation status
- Conservation Dependent (IUCN 2.3)

Scientific classification
- Kingdom: Plantae
- Clade: Tracheophytes
- Clade: Angiosperms
- Clade: Eudicots
- Clade: Rosids
- Order: Sapindales
- Family: Rutaceae
- Genus: Glycosmis
- Species: G. decipiens

Binomial name
- Glycosmis decipiens B.C.Stone

Species of flowering plant

Glycosmis decipiens is a species of plant in the family Rutaceae. It is endemic to Peninsular Malaysia. It is threatened by habitat loss. A population is protected in Taman Negara.
