= Acria nivalis =

Scientific classification
- Kingdom: Animalia
- Phylum: Arthropoda
- Clade: Pancrustacea
- Class: Insecta
- Order: Lepidoptera
- Family: Depressariidae
- Genus: Acria
- Species: A. nivalis

Binomial name
- Acria nivalis Wang & Li, 1999/2000

Species of moth

Acria nivalis is a moth in the family Depressariidae. It was described by Wang and Li in 1999 or 2000. It is found in China (Henan).

Some sources list this species as a synonym of Letogenes festalis Meyrick, 1930; Wang and Guan (2015) do not mention it among Chinese Acria.

The wingspan is 18–21 mm.
