= Glycosmis tomentella =

Conservation status
- Endangered (IUCN 2.3)

Scientific classification
- Kingdom: Plantae
- Clade: Tracheophytes
- Clade: Angiosperms
- Clade: Eudicots
- Clade: Rosids
- Order: Sapindales
- Family: Rutaceae
- Genus: Glycosmis
- Species: G. tomentella

Binomial name
- Glycosmis tomentella Ridl.

Species of flowering plant

Glycosmis tomentella is a species of flowering plant in the family Rutaceae. It is a shrub endemic to Peninsular Malaysia. It is threatened by habitat loss.
