= Acria sciogramma =

Scientific classification
- Kingdom: Animalia
- Phylum: Arthropoda
- Clade: Pancrustacea
- Class: Insecta
- Order: Lepidoptera
- Family: Depressariidae
- Genus: Acria
- Species: A. sciogramma

Binomial name
- Acria sciogramma Meyrick, 1915

Species of moth

Acria sciogramma is a moth in the family Depressariidae. It was described by Edward Meyrick in 1915. It is found in New Guinea.

== Description ==
The wingspan is about 18 mm. The forewings are yellow-whitish, sprinkled with fuscous. The stigmata is small, raised and black. There are three spots of fuscous irroration, the second giving rise to a curved oblique cloudy line of fuscous irroration. A similar slightly curved line is found from three-fourths of the costa to the tornus and there are three small spots of fuscous irroration on the costa towards the apex and two or three dots on the tornal margin. The hindwings are whitish grey.
