= Acria gossypiella =

Scientific classification
- Kingdom: Animalia
- Phylum: Arthropoda
- Clade: Pancrustacea
- Class: Insecta
- Order: Lepidoptera
- Family: Depressariidae
- Genus: Acria
- Species: A. gossypiella

Binomial name
- Acria gossypiella (Shiraki, 1913)

Synonyms
- Oxygrapha gossypiella Shiraki, 1913; Acleris gossypiella

Species of insect

Acria gossypiella is a moth in the family Depressariidae. It was described by Tokuichi Shiraki. It is found in Taiwan.

Adults are on wing at the end of June and in mid-December.

The larvae feed on cotton, tea, orange and camphor. The live in a web spun rectangularly on the mid-rib of the underside of a leaf of the host plant. On cotton however, it folds a leaf at the margin and lives within. The larvae are pale greenish with a rather broad greenish yellow dorsal stripe with and a pale yellowish green head. Full-grown larvae reach a length of about 17 mm. Pupation takes place in a thin cocoon spun in the web or folded leaf. The larvae can be found in May and December.
