= Dysodia viridatrix =

Scientific classification
- Kingdom: Animalia
- Phylum: Arthropoda
- Class: Insecta
- Order: Lepidoptera
- Family: Thyrididae
- Genus: Dysodia
- Species: D. viridatrix

Binomial name
- Dysodia viridatrix Walker, 1858

Species of moth

Dysodia viridatrix is a moth of the family Thyrididae first described by Francis Walker in 1858. It is found in India, Sri Lanka and Vietnam.

The larval food plant is Capparis spinosa.
