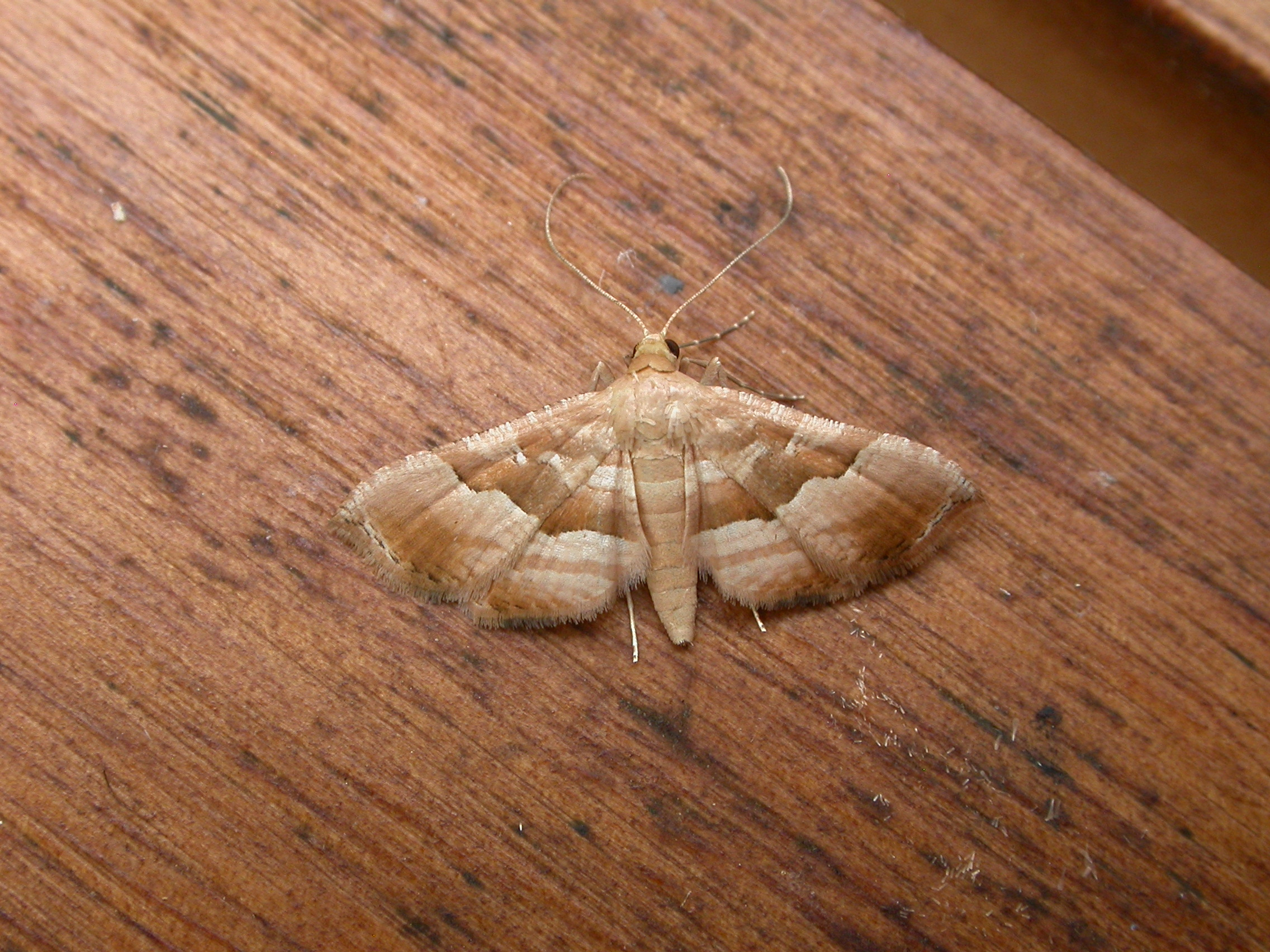

Scientific classification
- Kingdom: Animalia
- Phylum: Arthropoda
- Clade: Pancrustacea
- Class: Insecta
- Order: Lepidoptera
- Family: Thyrididae
- Genus: Addaea
- Species: A. pusilla

Binomial name
- Addaea pusilla (Butler, 1887)

Synonyms
- Microsca pusilla Butler, 1887

= Addaea pusilla =

Species of moth

Addaea pusilla is a species of moth of the family Thyrididae. It is found in New Guinea and Australia.

In New Guinea, the larval host are Macaranga spp. (Euphorbiaceae). Two genetically distinct lineages that differ in their host use coexist: one associated with M. quadriglandulosa, the other with M. clavata, M. fallacina, and M. dulcis.
