= Glycosmis crassifolia =

Conservation status
- Critically Endangered (IUCN 2.3)

Scientific classification
- Kingdom: Plantae
- Clade: Tracheophytes
- Clade: Angiosperms
- Clade: Eudicots
- Clade: Rosids
- Order: Sapindales
- Family: Rutaceae
- Genus: Glycosmis
- Species: G. crassifolia

Binomial name
- Glycosmis crassifolia Ridley

Species of tree

Glycosmis crassifolia is a species of plant in the family Rutaceae. It is a tree endemic to Peninsular Malaysia. It is threatened by habitat loss.
