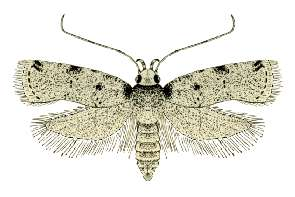
- Psorosticha zizyphi

Scientific classification
- Kingdom: Animalia
- Phylum: Arthropoda
- Clade: Pancrustacea
- Class: Insecta
- Order: Lepidoptera
- Family: Depressariidae
- Subfamily: Depressariinae
- Genus: Psorosticha; Lower, 1901

Type species
- "Psorosticha acrolopha" Lower

Synonyms
- Syllochitis Meyrick, 1910

= Psorosticha =

Genus of moths

Psorosticha is a moth genus of the superfamily Gelechioidea. It is included in the family Depressariidae, which is sometimes – particularly in older treatments – considered a subfamily of the Oecophoridae or included in the Elachistidae.

== Species ==
- Psorosticha melanocrepida Clarke, 1962 (Japan)
- Psorosticha neglecta Diakonoff, [1968] (Philippines)
- Psorosticha zizyphi (Stainton, 1859) (Australasia, Oriental, China)
