= Acria eulectra =

Scientific classification
- Kingdom: Animalia
- Phylum: Arthropoda
- Clade: Pancrustacea
- Class: Insecta
- Order: Lepidoptera
- Family: Depressariidae
- Genus: Acria
- Species: A. eulectra

Binomial name
- Acria eulectra Meyrick, 1908

Species of moth

Acria eulectra is a moth in the family Depressariidae. It was described by Edward Meyrick in 1908. It is found in India (Assam).

The wingspan is about 16 mm. The forewings are ochreous-white, with a suffused fuscous patch along the dorsum from the base to two-third, narrowed posteriorly and interrupted in the middle. There is a round patch in the middle of the disc, irregularly mixed with fuscous and blackish. There is also a line of dark fuscous and blackish scales ending in a small spot before the tornus and some slight brownish suffusion beyond this on the lower half, as well as a series of minute dark fuscous dots on the posterior half of the costa and termen. The hindwings are fuscous, thinly scaled and suffused with dark fuscous posteriorly.
