= Acria javanica =

Scientific classification
- Kingdom: Animalia
- Phylum: Arthropoda
- Clade: Pancrustacea
- Class: Insecta
- Order: Lepidoptera
- Family: Depressariidae
- Genus: Acria
- Species: A. javanica

Binomial name
- Acria javanica Lvovsky, 2015

Species of moth

Acria javanica is a moth in the family Depressariidae. It was described by Alexandr L. Lvovsky in 2015. It is found on the Indonesian islands of Sumba and Java.
