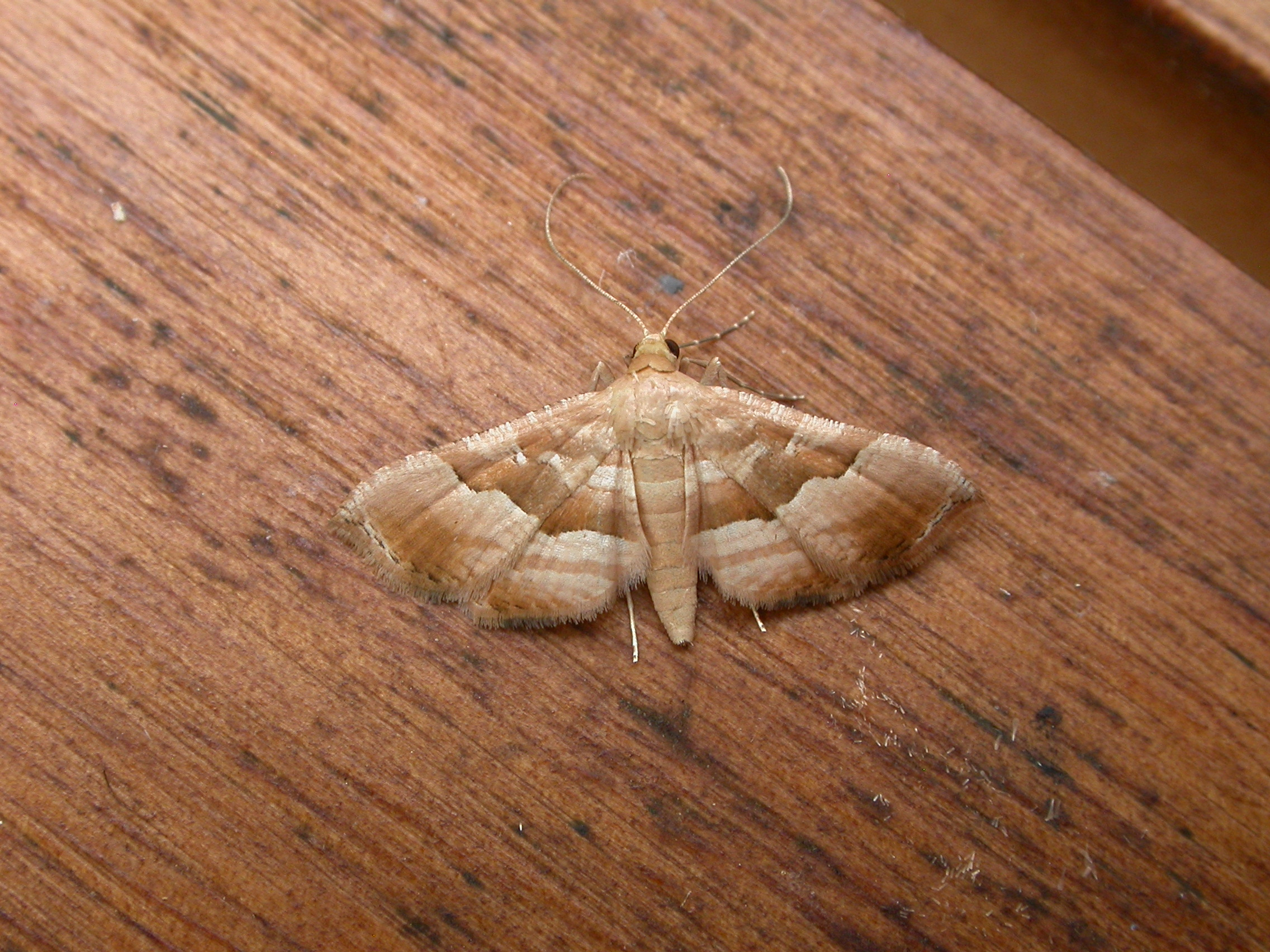
- Addaea pusilla

Scientific classification
- Kingdom: Animalia
- Phylum: Arthropoda
- Class: Insecta
- Order: Lepidoptera
- Family: Thyrididae
- Genus: Addaea; Walker, 1866

Synonyms
- Mesopempta Meyrick, 1886

= Addaea =

Genus of moths

Addaea is a genus of moths of the family Thyrididae erected by Francis Walker in 1866.

== Description ==
Palpi upturned, short and thickly scaled. Antennae annulated and minutely ciliated. Hind tibia thickened. Forewings with vein 8 and 9 stalked. Vein 10 from just before the angle of cell. Hindwing with vein 5 from the center of discocellulars.

== Species ==
- Addaea aneranna Turner, 1915
- Addaea fragilis Warren, 1899
- Addaea fulva Warren, 1907
- Addaea heliopsamma (Meyrick, 1886)
- Addaea polyphoralis (Walker, 1866)
- Addaea pusilla (Butler, 1887)
- Addaea subtessellata Walker, 1866
- Addaea trimeronalis (Walker, 1859)
