= Acria amphorodes =

Scientific classification
- Kingdom: Animalia
- Phylum: Arthropoda
- Clade: Pancrustacea
- Class: Insecta
- Order: Lepidoptera
- Family: Depressariidae
- Genus: Acria
- Species: A. amphorodes

Binomial name
- Acria amphorodes (Meyrick, 1923)

Synonyms
- Arcria amphorodes Meyrick, 1923

Indian species of moth in genus Acria

Acria amphorodes is a moth in the family Depressariidae. It was described by Edward Meyrick in 1923. It is found in India (Punjab).

The wingspan is about 22 mm. The forewings are pale ochreous, faintly tinged with brownish. There is a cloudy V-shaped dark brown streak resting on the costal prominences, the apex in the middle of the disc, immediately followed by a raised snow-white dot. There is an indistinct fine dark brown dentate-curved subterminal line and dark brown marginal dots around the apex and termen. The hindwings are ochreous-whitish, tinged with grey towards the termen.
