= Psorosticha melanocrepida =

Scientific classification
- Domain: Eukaryota
- Kingdom: Animalia
- Phylum: Arthropoda
- Class: Insecta
- Order: Lepidoptera
- Family: Depressariidae
- Genus: Psorosticha
- Species: P. melanocrepida

Binomial name
- Psorosticha melanocrepida Clarke, 1962

Species of moth

Psorosticha melanocrepida is a moth in the family Depressariidae. It was described by Clarke in 1962. It is found in Japan (Kyushu).

The wingspan is 16–18 mm. The forewings are clay colour, with the base, a spot at the mid-costa and an oblique bar from the costa slightly before the apex all blackish-fuscous. There is an ill-defined oblique, blackish-fuscous streak in the cell, at about the middle of the wing with a spot of raised scales at the outer end. There is a series of minute blackish-fuscous spots arranged in an outwardly curved arc at the basal third and a series of four or five small blackish-fuscous spots around the termen. The remainder of the forewings is marked with scattered blackish-fuscous scales. The hindwings are greyish, basally shading to fuscous at the margins.

The larvae feed on Citrus unshiu.
