= Acria equibicruris =

Scientific classification
- Kingdom: Animalia
- Phylum: Arthropoda
- Clade: Pancrustacea
- Class: Insecta
- Order: Lepidoptera
- Family: Depressariidae
- Genus: Acria
- Species: A. equibicruris

Binomial name
- Acria equibicruris Wang, 2008

Chinese species of moth in genus Acria

Acria equibicruris is a moth in the family Depressariidae. It was described by Wang Shuxia in 2008. It is known from Guizhou, China.

The wingspan is 17–18 mm.
