= Acria sulawesica =

Scientific classification
- Kingdom: Animalia
- Phylum: Arthropoda
- Clade: Pancrustacea
- Class: Insecta
- Order: Lepidoptera
- Family: Depressariidae
- Genus: Acria
- Species: A. sulawesica

Binomial name
- Acria sulawesica Lvovsky, 2015

Species of moth

Acria sulawesica is a moth in the family Depressariidae. It was described by Alexandr L. Lvovsky in 2015. It is found on the Indonesian island of Sulawesi.

The wingspan is about 14.5 mm.

== Etymology ==
The species is named for Sulawesi, the type locality.
