= Acria ornithorrhyncha =

Scientific classification
- Kingdom: Animalia
- Phylum: Arthropoda
- Clade: Pancrustacea
- Class: Insecta
- Order: Lepidoptera
- Family: Depressariidae
- Genus: Acria
- Species: A. ornithorrhyncha

Binomial name
- Acria ornithorrhyncha Wang, 2008

Species of moth

Acria ornithorrhyncha is a moth in the family Depressariidae. It was described by Wang Shuxia in 2008. It is known from China (Guangdong, Hongkong).

The wingspan is 16–21 mm.
