= Glycosmis macrantha =

Conservation status
- Least Concern (IUCN 3.1)

Scientific classification
- Kingdom: Plantae
- Clade: Embryophytes
- Clade: Tracheophytes
- Clade: Spermatophytes
- Clade: Angiosperms
- Clade: Eudicots
- Clade: Rosids
- Order: Sapindales
- Family: Rutaceae
- Genus: Glycosmis
- Species: G. macrantha

Binomial name
- Glycosmis macrantha Merr.

Synonyms
- Glycosmis oliveri Stapf ex Ridl.

Species of tree

Glycosmis macrantha is a tree in the family Rutaceae. The specific epithet macrantha is from the Greek meaning 'large flower'.

== Description ==
Glycosmis macrantha grows as a tree up to 20 metres (70 ft) tall with a trunk diameter of up to 20 cm (8 in). The large flowers are whitish in colour. The ovoid fruits measure up to 1 cm (0.4 in) long.

== Distribution and habitat ==
Glycosmis macrantha is endemic to Borneo. Its habitat is forests, and sometimes in disturbed habitats, from sea-level to 1,400 m (4,600 ft) altitude.
