= Psorosticha neglecta =

Scientific classification
- Domain: Eukaryota
- Kingdom: Animalia
- Phylum: Arthropoda
- Class: Insecta
- Order: Lepidoptera
- Family: Depressariidae
- Genus: Psorosticha
- Species: P. neglecta

Binomial name
- Psorosticha neglecta Diakonoff, [1968]

Species of moth

Psorosticha neglecta is a moth in the family Depressariidae. It was described by Alexey Diakonoff in 1968. It is found in the Philippines (Luzon).

The wingspan is about 19 mm for males and 20 mm for females. The forewings are pale fulvous pinkish, strewn with blackish-grey scales and blackish-grey raised tufts. There is a wedge-shaped basal patch and two small dark tufts in an oblique row, as well as a more oblique series of some five points from below the first tuft to the fold well beyond the second tuft. There are two larger transverse tufts in a series from about three-fifths of the costa to three-fourths of the dorsum and a group of minute raised scales on the dorsum. There is a series of narrow black marginal marks along the terminal edge. The hindwings are glossy, pale grey bronze.
