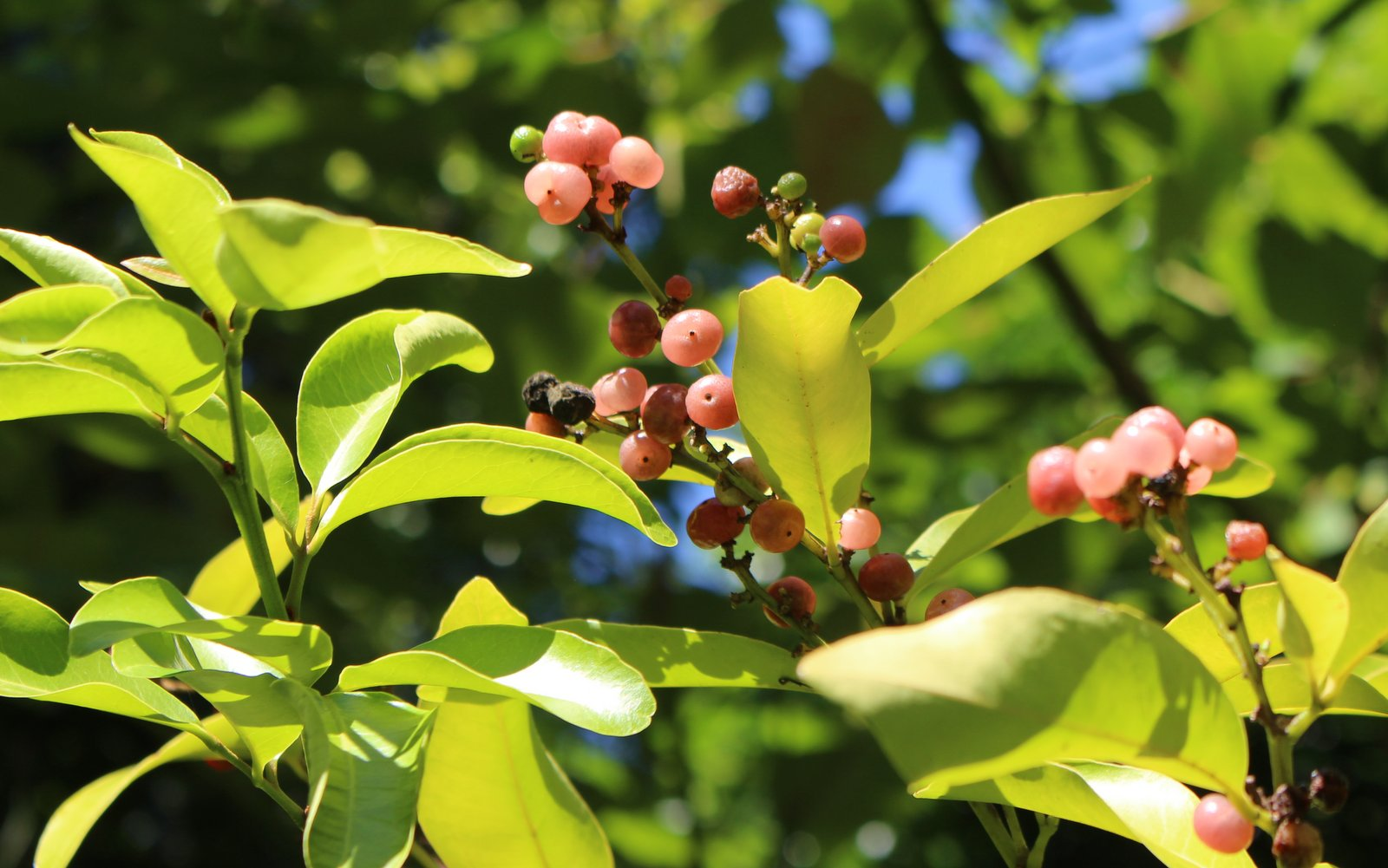

Scientific classification
- Kingdom: Plantae
- Clade: Tracheophytes
- Clade: Angiosperms
- Clade: Eudicots
- Clade: Rosids
- Order: Sapindales
- Family: Rutaceae
- Genus: Glycosmis
- Species: G. trifoliata

Binomial name
- Glycosmis trifoliata (Blume) Spreng.

Synonyms
- Sclerostylis trifoliata Bl.; Glycosmis pentaphylla (Retz.) DC.

= Glycosmis trifoliata =

Pink fruited limeberry

Species of flowering plant

Glycosmis trifoliata, the pink fruited limeberry, is a species of shrub or small tree in the family Rutaceae. Found in northern Australia, Papua New Guinea and Malesia. The habitat includes monsoon forest, beach scrub, vine thickets and drier rainforest areas.
