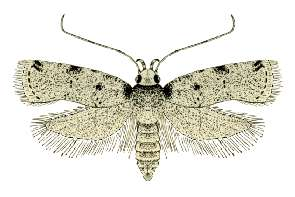

Scientific classification
- Kingdom: Animalia
- Phylum: Arthropoda
- Clade: Pancrustacea
- Class: Insecta
- Order: Lepidoptera
- Family: Depressariidae
- Genus: Psorosticha
- Species: P. zizyphi

Binomial name
- Psorosticha zizyphi (Stainton, 1859)

Synonyms
- Depressaria zizyphi Stainton, 1859; Depressaria angusta Walsingham, in Moore, [1884-87]; Psorosticha acrolopha Lower, 1901

= Psorosticha zizyphi =

Species of moth

Psorosticha zizyphi, the citrus leaf roller, is a moth of the family Depressariidae.

== Distribution ==
It is found in south-east Asia, including Hong Kong, India, Iran, United Arab Emirates, Sri Lanka, New Guinea and Queensland and New South Wales in Australia.

== Food plants ==
The larvae feed on young shoots of various trees in family Rutaceae, including Citrus limon, Citrus reticulata, Aegle marmelos, Feronia elephantum, Glycosmis pentaphylla and Murraya koenigii, as well as other plants, such as Ziziphus jujuba and Ailanthus excelsa.
