= List of moths of India =

The following is a list of the moths of India. It is estimated that approximately 10,000 species of moths exist in India.

== Family lists for Indian moths ==
- Alucitidae
- Bombycidae
- Brachodidae
- Brahmaeidae
- Choreutidae
- Cosmopterigidae
- Cossidae
- Crambidae
- Depressariidae
- Drepanidae
- Elachistidae
- Urodeta jurateae Sruoga & Rociene, 2018
- Urodeta pectena Sruoga & Rociene, 2018
- Erebidae
- Eupterotidae
- Gelechiidae
- Geometridae
- Glyphipterigidae
- Gracillariidae
- Hepialidae
- Immidae
- Lasiocampidae
- Lecithoceridae
- Limacodidae
- Lymantriidae
- Noctuidae
- Nolidae
- Notodontidae
- Oecophoridae
- Pantheidae
- Peleopodidae
- Phaudidae
- Psychidae
- Pterophoridae
- Pyralidae
- Saturniidae
- Sesiidae
- Sphingidae
- Thyrididae
- Tineidae
- Tortricidae
- Uraniidae
- Xyloryctidae
- Yponomeutidae
- Zygaenidae

== See also ==
- Lepidoptera
- Fauna of India
- Flora of India
