= Acria xanthosaris =

Scientific classification
- Kingdom: Animalia
- Phylum: Arthropoda
- Clade: Pancrustacea
- Class: Insecta
- Order: Lepidoptera
- Family: Depressariidae
- Genus: Acria
- Species: A. xanthosaris

Binomial name
- Acria xanthosaris Meyrick, 1908

Species of moth

Acria xanthosaris is a moth in the family Depressariidae. It was described by Edward Meyrick in 1908. It is found in India (Assam).

The wingspan is 16–18 mm. The forewings are pale reddish grey, irrorated with reddish-fuscous. There is a cloudy dark grey spot on the dorsum at one-fourth and cloudy dark grey marks on the costa at one-third, as well as before and after the sinuation. The stigmata is small and dark fuscous and there is an angulated dark grey line from beyond the costal sinuation to before the termen. The hindwings are fuscous, but darker posteriorly.
