= Acria cocophaga =

Scientific classification
- Kingdom: Animalia
- Phylum: Arthropoda
- Clade: Pancrustacea
- Class: Insecta
- Order: Lepidoptera
- Family: Depressariidae
- Genus: Acria
- Species: A. cocophaga

Binomial name
- Acria cocophaga Chen & Wu, 2011

Chinese species of moth in genus Acria

Acria cocophaga is a moth in the family Depressariidae. It was described by Chen Fuqiang and Wu Chunsheng in 2011. It is found in Hainan, China.

The wingspan for males is 13–15 mm (0.51–0.59 in) and for females 14.5–17 mm (0.57–0.67 in). The larvae feed on Cocos nucifera.
