= Glycosmis chlorosperma =

Conservation status
- Least Concern (IUCN 3.1)

Scientific classification
- Kingdom: Plantae
- Clade: Embryophytes
- Clade: Tracheophytes
- Clade: Spermatophytes
- Clade: Angiosperms
- Clade: Eudicots
- Clade: Rosids
- Order: Sapindales
- Family: Rutaceae
- Genus: Glycosmis
- Species: G. chlorosperma

Binomial name
- Glycosmis chlorosperma (Blume) Spreng.

Synonyms
- Cookia chlorosperma Blume; Dioxippe chlorosperma (Blume) M.Roem.

Species of plant

Glycosmis chlorosperma is a plant in the family Rutaceae. The specific epithet chlorosperma means 'green seed'.

== Description ==
Glycosmis chlorosperma grows as a shrub or small tree. The leaves are lanceolate to oblong and measure up to 20 cm (8 in) long, occasionally to 30 cm (12 in). The inflorescences, in panicles, feature white flowers.

== Varieties ==
The following varieties of Glycosmis chlorosperma are recognised:

- Glycosmis chlorosperma var. angustifolia V.Naray. – Peninsular Malaysia, Borneo
- Glycosmis chlorosperma var. bidiensis B.C.Stone – Borneo (Sarawak)
- Glycosmis chlorosperma var. chlorosperma
- Glycosmis chlorosperma var. elmeri (Merr.) Tanaka – Nicobar Islands, Borneo, Philippines
- Glycosmis chlorosperma var. lindleyana (Swingle) B.C.Stone – Peninsular Malaysia
- Glycosmis chlorosperma var. macrorachis (King) B.C.Stone – Peninsular Malaysia
- Glycosmis chlorosperma var. paraphyllophora B.C.Stone – Peninsular Malaysia, Thailand

== Distribution and habitat ==
Glycosmis chlorosperma is native to the Andaman and Nicobar Islands, Myanmar, Thailand, Vietnam and maritime Southeast Asia. Its habitat is in lowland forests.
