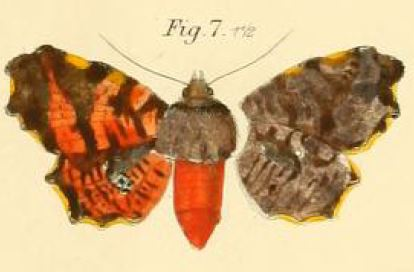

Scientific classification
- Domain: Eukaryota
- Kingdom: Animalia
- Phylum: Arthropoda
- Class: Insecta
- Order: Lepidoptera
- Family: Thyrididae
- Genus: Dysodia
- Species: D. zellerii

Binomial name
- Dysodia zellerii (Dewitz, 1881)

Synonyms
- Pachythyris zellerii Dewitz, 1881

= Dysodia zellerii =

Species of moth

Dysodia zellerii is a species of moth of the family Thyrididae.

== Distribution ==
This species is found in Angola, Cameroon, Nigeria, Sierra Leone and Uganda.
