= Glycosmis superba =

Conservation status
- Least Concern (IUCN 3.1)

Scientific classification
- Kingdom: Plantae
- Clade: Embryophytes
- Clade: Tracheophytes
- Clade: Spermatophytes
- Clade: Angiosperms
- Clade: Eudicots
- Clade: Rosids
- Order: Sapindales
- Family: Rutaceae
- Genus: Glycosmis
- Species: G. superba

Binomial name
- Glycosmis superba B.C.Stone

Species of flowering plant

Glycosmis superba is a plant of Borneo in the family Rutaceae. The specific epithet superba is from the Latin meaning 'splendid', referring to the leaves.

== Description ==
Glycosmis superba grows as a shrub or small tree up to 10 metres (30 ft) tall with a trunk diameter of up to 10 cm (4 in). The large leaves measure up to 33 cm (13 in) long.

== Distribution and habitat ==
Glycosmis superba is endemic to Borneo, where it is found in Brunei and Sarawak. Its habitat is forests from sea-level to 100 m (300 ft) altitude.
