= Acria meyricki =

Scientific classification
- Kingdom: Animalia
- Phylum: Arthropoda
- Clade: Pancrustacea
- Class: Insecta
- Order: Lepidoptera
- Family: Depressariidae
- Genus: Acria
- Species: A. meyricki

Binomial name
- Acria meyricki Shashank, Saravana, Kalidas, Phanikumar, Ramamurthy & Bose, 2015

Species of moth

Acria meyricki, also known as oil palm leaf webworm, is a moth in the family Depressariidae. It was described by Shashank and colleagues in 2015 and named in honor of Edward Meyrick, "renowned expert of Microlepidoptera". It is known from Andhra Pradesh, India.

The forewing length is 5.5–7.2 mm (0.22–0.28 in). The larvae feed on oil palms. They can also successfully develop when feeding on coconut (Cocos nucifera). Since 2005, Acria meyricki has become a regular pest on oil palm plantations, sometimes causing severe damage.
