= Acria obtusella =

Scientific classification
- Kingdom: Animalia
- Phylum: Arthropoda
- Clade: Pancrustacea
- Class: Insecta
- Order: Lepidoptera
- Family: Depressariidae
- Genus: Acria
- Species: A. obtusella

Binomial name
- Acria obtusella (Walker, 1864)

Synonyms
- Tisdra obtusella Walker, 1864; Amphoritis nycterodes Meyrick, 1905

Species of moth

Acria obtusella is a moth in the family Depressariidae. It was described by Francis Walker in 1864. It is found in Sri Lanka and on Borneo.

The wingspan is about 13 mm. The forewings are dark fuscous, slightly tinged with ferruginous. The stigmata is small and blackish fuscous and there is an indistinct blackish-fuscous angulated subterminal line. The hindwings are dark coppery fuscous.
