= Glycosmis lanceolata =

Conservation status
- Least Concern (IUCN 3.1)

Scientific classification
- Kingdom: Plantae
- Clade: Tracheophytes
- Clade: Angiosperms
- Clade: Eudicots
- Clade: Rosids
- Order: Sapindales
- Family: Rutaceae
- Genus: Glycosmis
- Species: G. lanceolata

Binomial name
- Glycosmis lanceolata (Blume) D.Dietr.

Synonyms
- Sclerostylis lanceolata Blume; Glycosmis angularis Elmer; Glycosmis hainanensis C.C.Huang; Glycosmis montana Pierre; Glycosmis simplicifolia Spreng.; Glycosmis zippelii B.C.Stone; Helie lanceolata M.Roem.

Species of plant

Glycosmis lanceolata is a plant in the family Rutaceae. The specific epithet lanceolata means 'spear-shaped', referring to the leaves.

== Description ==
Glycosmis lanceolata grows as a shrub or as a tree up to 18 m (60 ft) tall, with a trunk diameter to 25 cm (10 in). The shiny bark is cracked. The leaves are oblanceolate to ovate to oblong and measure up to 17 cm (7 in) long. The inflorescences, in panicles, feature small pentamerous flowers. The fruits are round.

== Distribution and habitat ==
Glycosmis lanceolata is native to China (Hainan), Vietnam, Peninsular Malaysia, the Philippines, Borneo, Java and the Lesser Sunda Islands. Its habitat is in lowland forests.

== Conservation ==
Glycosmis lanceolata has been assessed as least concern on the IUCN Red List. The species is found across an extensive area. The species is extinct in Singapore.
