= Acria malacolectra =

Scientific classification
- Kingdom: Animalia
- Phylum: Arthropoda
- Clade: Pancrustacea
- Class: Insecta
- Order: Lepidoptera
- Family: Depressariidae
- Genus: Acria
- Species: A. malacolectra

Binomial name
- Acria malacolectra Meyrick, 1930

Species of moth

Acria malacolectra is a moth in the family Depressariidae. It was described by Edward Meyrick in 1930. It is found in New Guinea.
