= List of moths of India (Brahmaeidae) =

This is a list of moths of the family Brahmaeidae that are found in India. It also acts as an index to the species articles and forms part of the full List of moths of India.

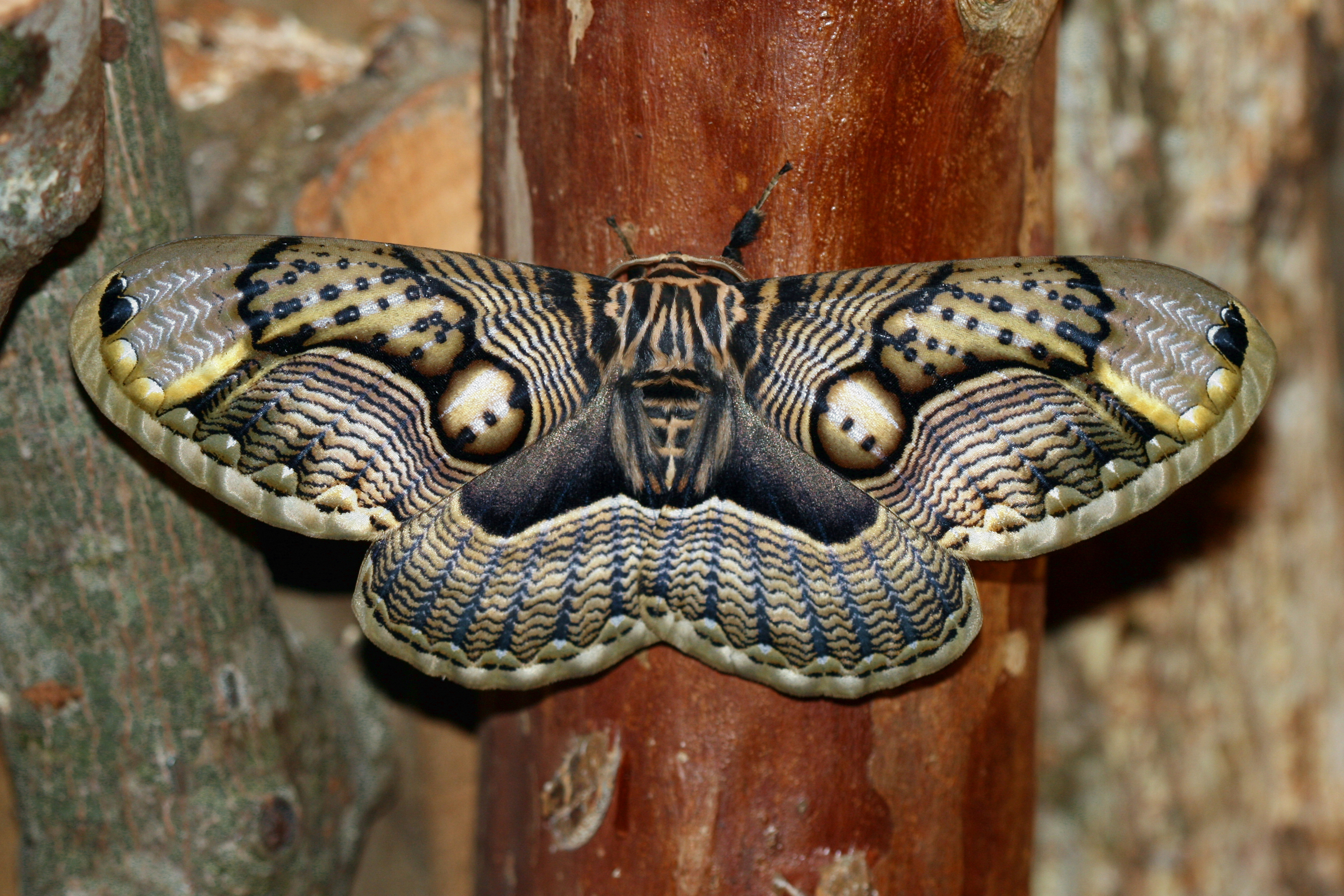
Brahmaea wallichii

== Genus Brahmaea ==
- Brahmaea wallichii (Gray, 1831)

== Genus Brahmidia ==
- Brahmidia hearseyi (White, 1862) Listed in Hampson (Fauna of British India: Moths vol.1) as Brahmaea hearseyi

== See also ==
- Brahmaeidae
- Moths
- Lepidoptera
- List of moths of India
