= Acria emarginella =

Scientific classification
- Kingdom: Animalia
- Phylum: Arthropoda
- Clade: Pancrustacea
- Class: Insecta
- Order: Lepidoptera
- Family: Depressariidae
- Genus: Acria
- Species: A. emarginella

Binomial name
- Acria emarginella (Donovan, 1804)

Synonyms
- Phalaena emarginella Donovan, 1804; Amphoritis camelodes Meyrick, 1905

Asian species of moth in genus Acria

Acria emarginella is a moth in the family Depressariidae. It was described by Edward Donovan in 1804. It is found in China (Henan, Sichuan, Tianjin, Zhejiang), Sri Lanka, India and Japan.

The wingspan is 19–23 mm.
