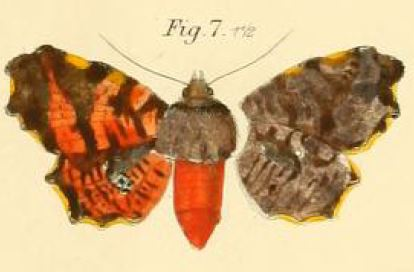
- Dysodia zellerii

Scientific classification
- Kingdom: Animalia
- Phylum: Arthropoda
- Clade: Pancrustacea
- Class: Insecta
- Order: Lepidoptera
- Family: Thyrididae
- Subfamily: Thyridinae
- Genus: Dysodia; Clemens, 1860

Synonyms
- Pachythyris Felder & Rogenhofer, 1875; Platythyris Grote & Robinson, 1866; Varnia Walker, 1863

= Dysodia =

Genus of moths of the family Thyrididae

Dysodia is a genus of moths of the family Thyrididae. It was described by James Brackenridge Clemens in 1860.

== Description ==
Forewings long. Hindwings with apex acute, the outer margin straight. Palpi thickly scaled, upturned, reaching above vertex of head, the third joint acute. Antennae simple in both sexes. Legs are with hairy femur and tibia. Forewings excurved at veins 2, 3 and 4. Veins 7, 8 and 9 from close to the angle of cell. Hindwings with vein 5 from lower angle of cell. The outer margin is irregular and excised below the apex. Thorax and abdomen is stout.

== Species ==
Some species of this genus are:

- Dysodia amania Whalley, 1968
- Dysodia antennata Whalley, 1968
- Dysodia binoculata Warren, 1901
- Dysodia brandbergensis Thiele, 2004
- Dysodia collinsi Whalley, 1968
- Dysodia constellata Warren, 1908
- Dysodia fenestratella Warren, 1900
- Dysodia flavidula Warren, 1908
- Dysodia fumida Whalley, 1968
- Dysodia hamata Whalley, 1968
- Dysodia ignita (Walker, 1865)
- Dysodia incognita Whalley, 1968
- Dysodia intermedia (Walker, 1865)
- Dysodia lutescens Whalley, 1968
- Dysodia magnifica Whalley, 1968
- Dysodia meyi Thiele, 2004
- Dysodia namibiensis Thiele, 2004
- Dysodia parvita Whalley, 1971
- Dysodia subsignata Warren, 1908
- Dysodia vitrina (Boisduval, 1829)
- Dysodia zellerii (Dewitz, 1881)
