= Mount Pueh =

Mountain in Malaysia

Coordinates: 1°48′N 109°41′E

Mount Pueh (Malay: Gunung Pueh), also known as Mount Pueh-Berumput, Mount Poi and Mount Poe, is a mountain located near Lundu, Sarawak on the Malaysia-Indonesia border. Mount Pueh was known to biologists for the collections made there by Eric Mjöberg (1882–1938), a Swedish naturalist, who was Curator of the Sarawak Museum between 1922 and 1924. Mjöberg's herpetological collections from Gunung Pueh between October and December 1923, and other localities in Borneo, were reported by Smith (1925). Mjöberg, unfortunately, left little by way of written records, of his ascent of Pueh and the collections he made.

In 2002, an exploration was organised to find out about the area. During a scientific expedition to the summit of Mount Berumput on 6–14 May 2002, 26 species of birds, four species of bats and one species of rat were observed. The only montane endemic recorded in this expedition is the grey fruit bat, Aethalops alecto. Based on their tracks and other signs, wild pigs (Sus barbatus) were common near the summit. Three arcuate horseshoe bats (Rhinolophus arcuatus), previously recorded only from Bungoh cave near Bau in Sarawak.

In 2012, dragonfly species on the mountain were surveyed. A collection was made of 67 species of dragonfly. This included Libellago stigmatizans and Copera ciliata which had not been previously recorded in the area.

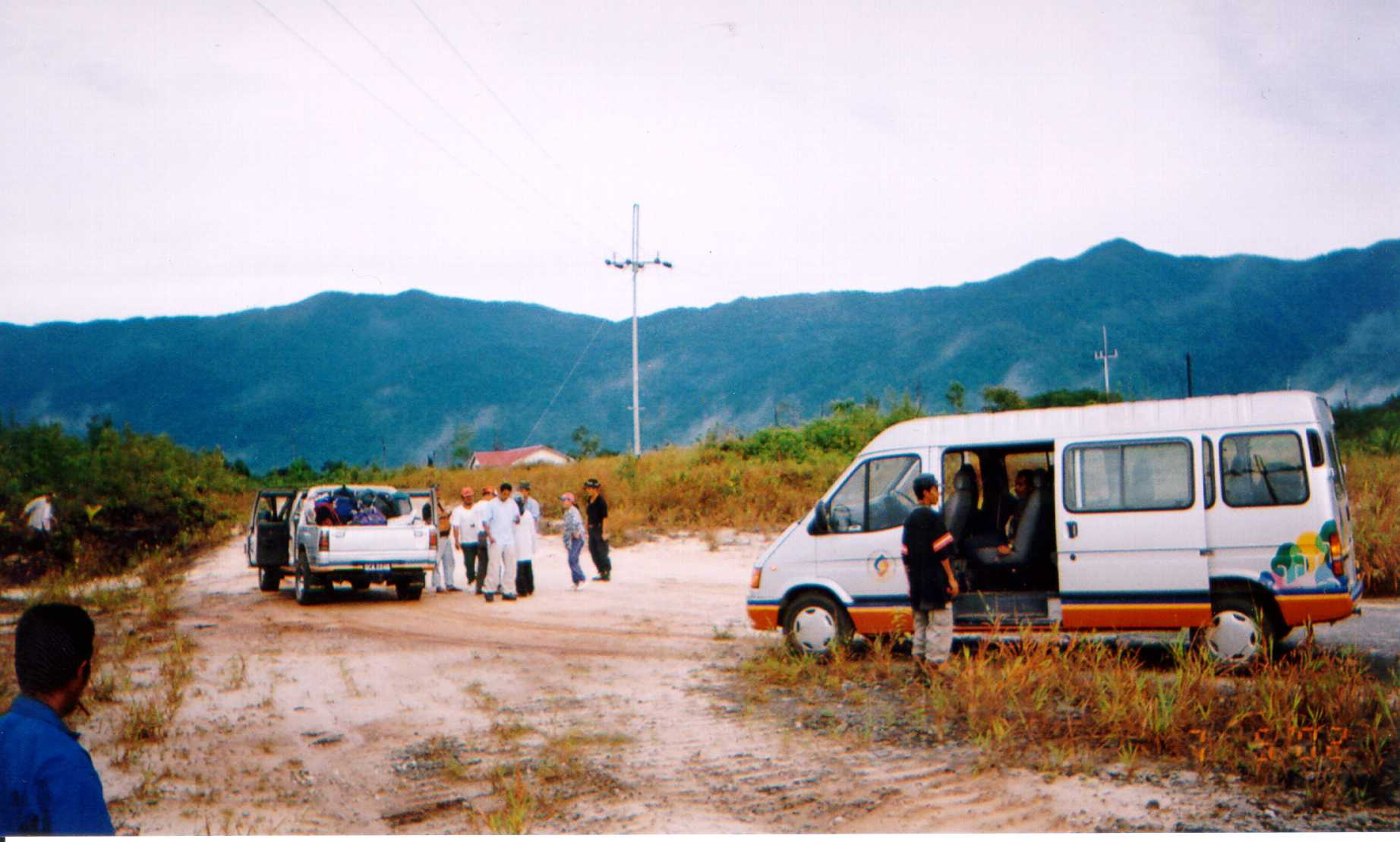
View of the Berumput-Pueh mountain range from the Lundu.

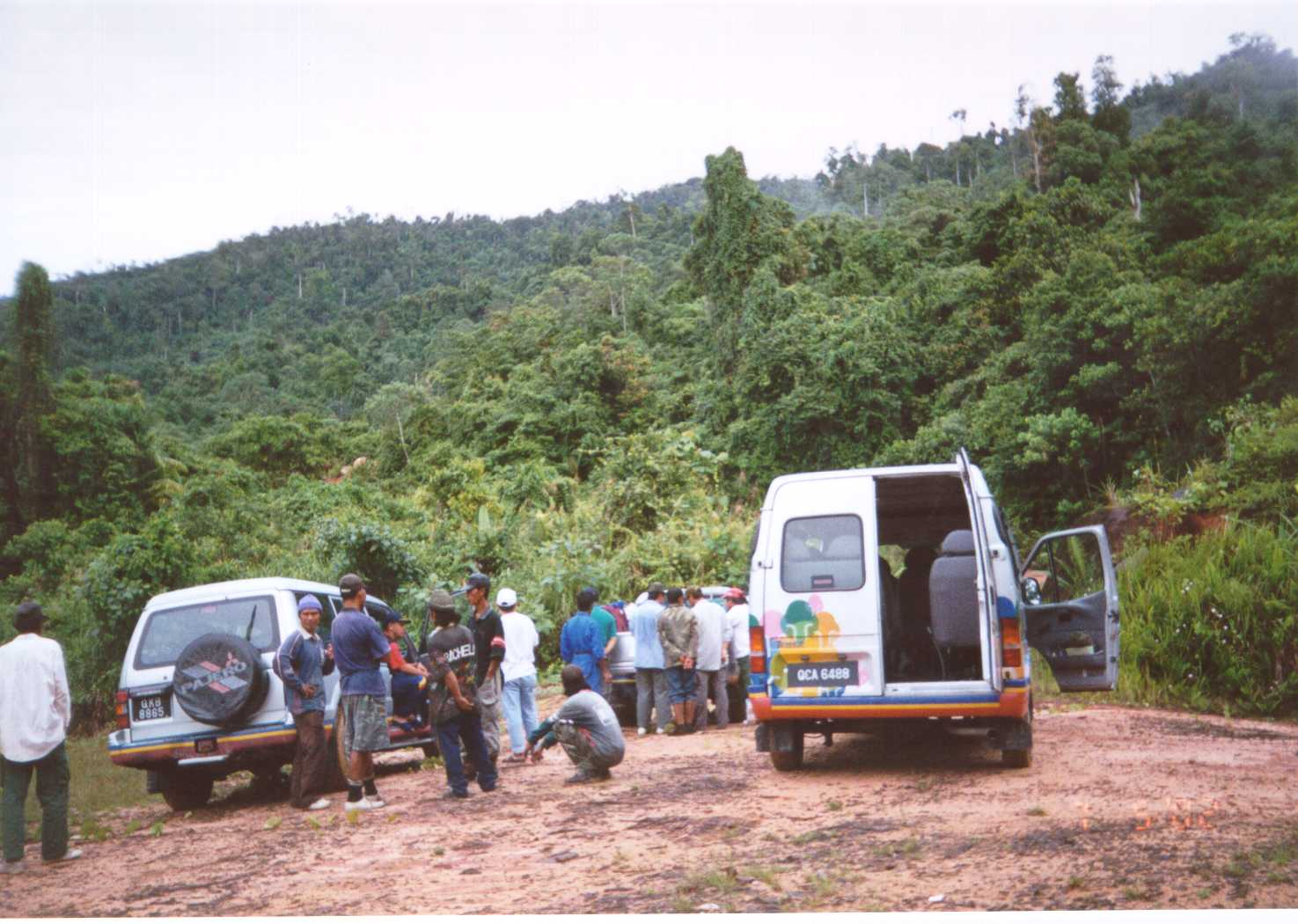
Dirt road to the foot of the Berumput-Pueh range.

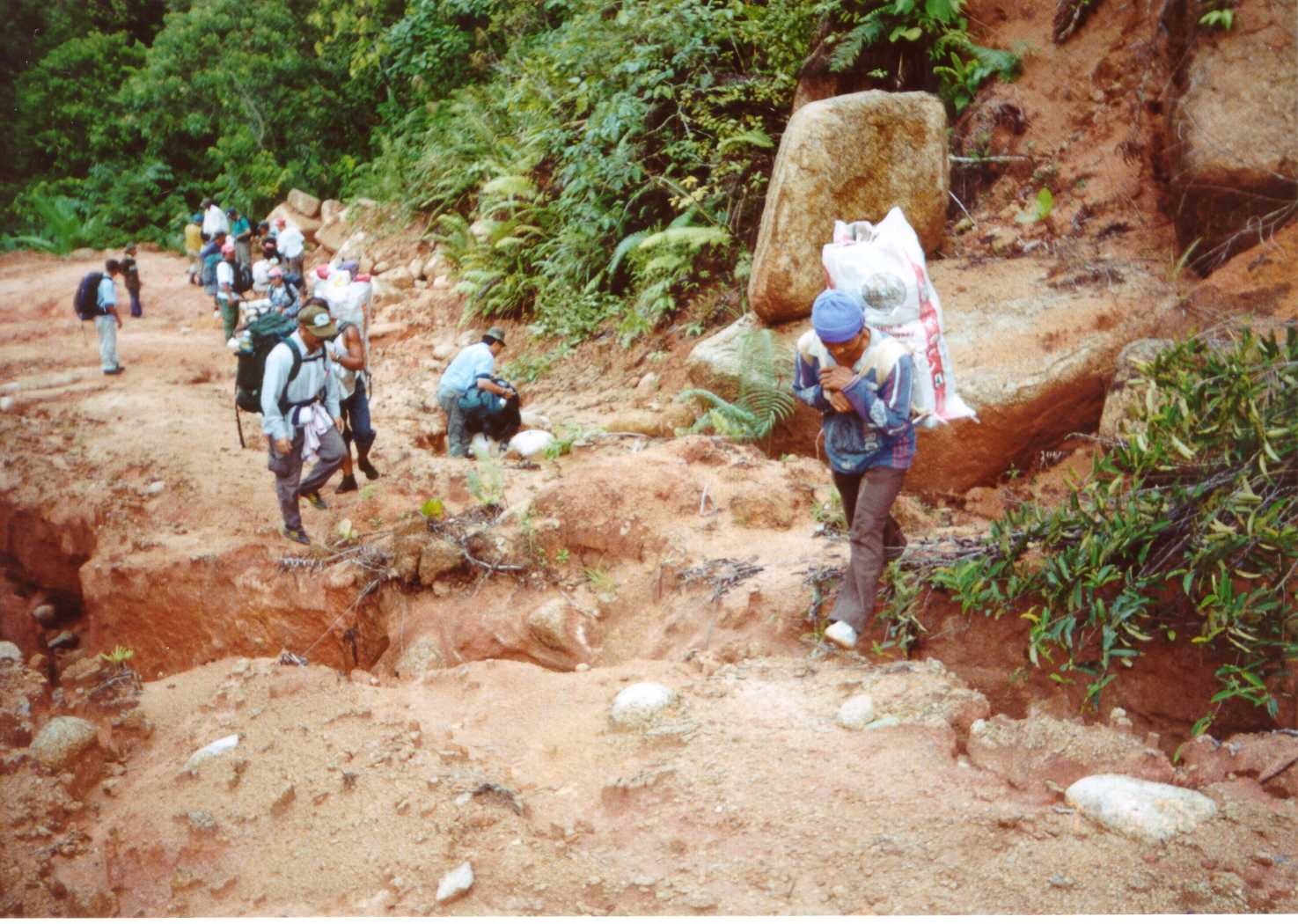
Old logging road to the mountain.

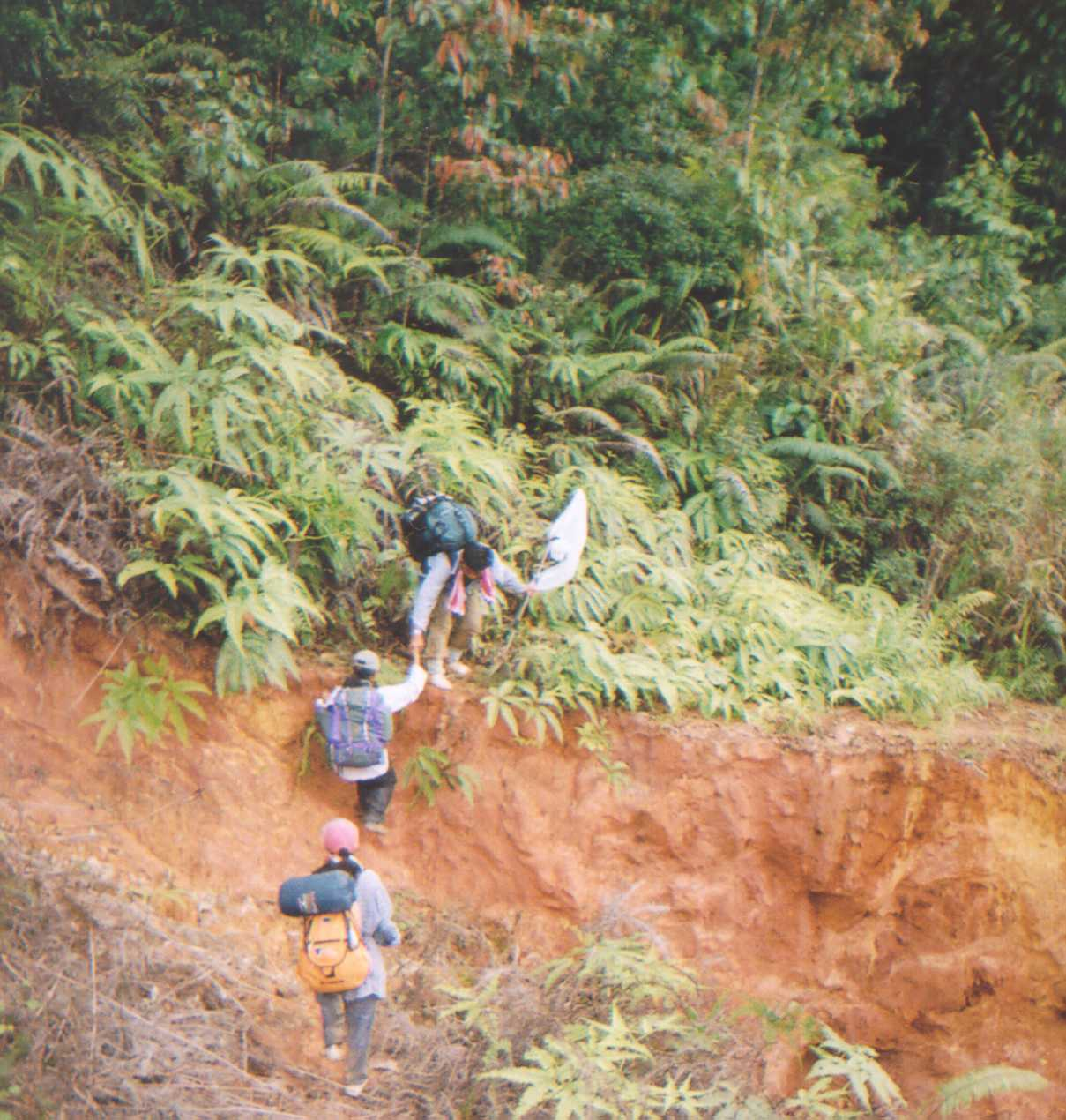
Old and rugged path.

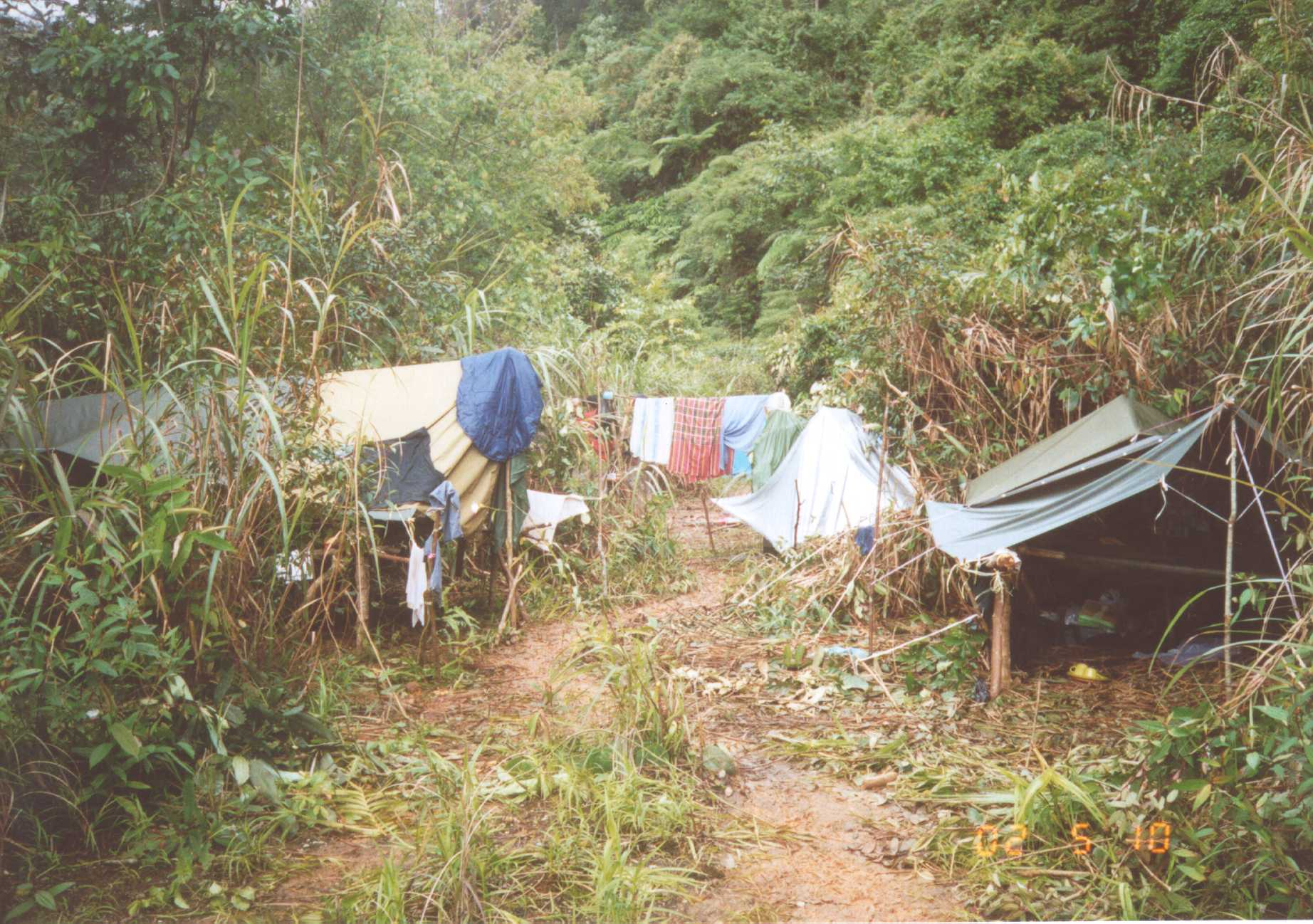
Base camp near Mount Berumput.

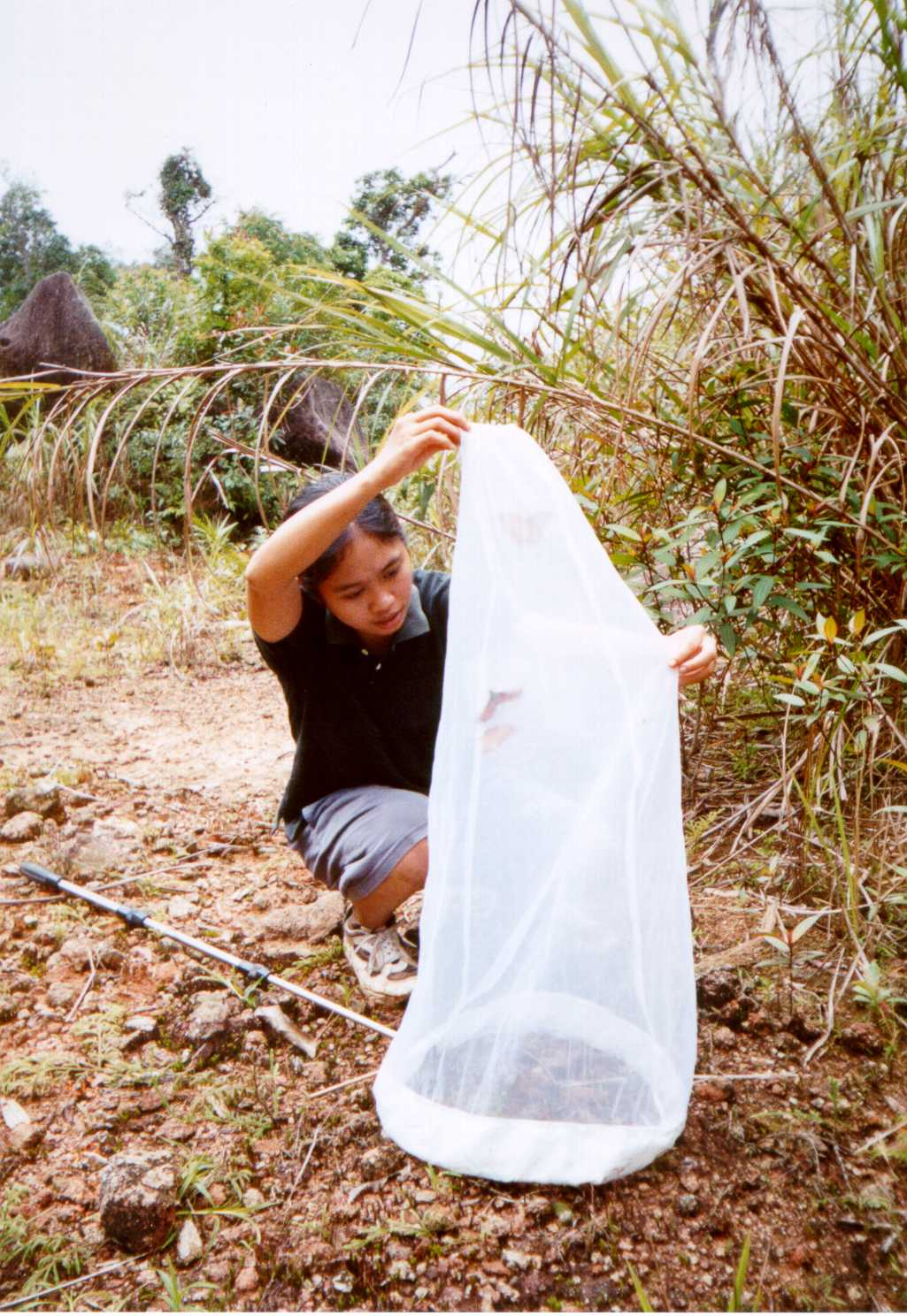
Many insects to catch.

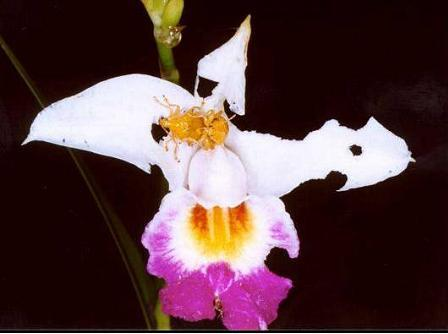
Flower and insects.
