= Acria ceramitis =

Scientific classification
- Kingdom: Animalia
- Phylum: Arthropoda
- Clade: Pancrustacea
- Class: Insecta
- Order: Lepidoptera
- Family: Depressariidae
- Genus: Acria
- Species: A. ceramitis

Binomial name
- Acria ceramitis Meyrick, 1908

Asian species of moth in genus Acria

Acria ceramitis is a moth in the family Depressariidae. It was described by Edward Meyrick in 1908. It is found in China (Gansu, Guizhou, Henan, Hubei, Hunan, Jiangxi, Shaanxi, Shandong, Shanghai, Sichuan), southern India, Assam, Korea and Japan.

The wingspan is 16–19 mm. The forewings are fuscous or grey, usually partially tinged with reddish. The costal edge in the sinuation is usually reddish-ochreous. The stigmata is small and dark fuscous, the plical somewhat beyond the first discal. There is an angulated subterminal series of indistinct dark fuscous cloudy dots. The hindwings are fuscous, sometimes tinged with ochreous, but always darker towards the apex.

The larvae feed on Malus pumila.
