= Addaea trimeronalis =

Scientific classification
- Kingdom: Animalia
- Phylum: Arthropoda
- Clade: Pancrustacea
- Class: Insecta
- Order: Lepidoptera
- Family: Thyrididae
- Genus: Addaea
- Species: A. trimeronalis

Binomial name
- Addaea trimeronalis Walker, 1859

Synonyms
- Addaea fragilis Warren, 1899; Mesopempta heliopsamma Meyrick, 1886

Species of moth

Addaea trimeronalis is a moth of the family Thyrididae first described by Francis Walker in 1859. It is found in Sri Lanka and India.
