= Dysodia ignita =

Scientific classification
- Kingdom: Animalia
- Phylum: Arthropoda
- Class: Insecta
- Order: Lepidoptera
- Family: Thyrididae
- Genus: Dysodia
- Species: D. ignita

Binomial name
- Dysodia ignita Walker, [1866] 1865

Synonyms
- Varnia ignita Walker, [1866] 1865; Dysodia bipuncta Warren, 1900

Species of moth

Dysodia ignita is a moth of the family Thyrididae first described by Francis Walker in 1865. It is found in India, Sri Lanka and Bangladesh.
