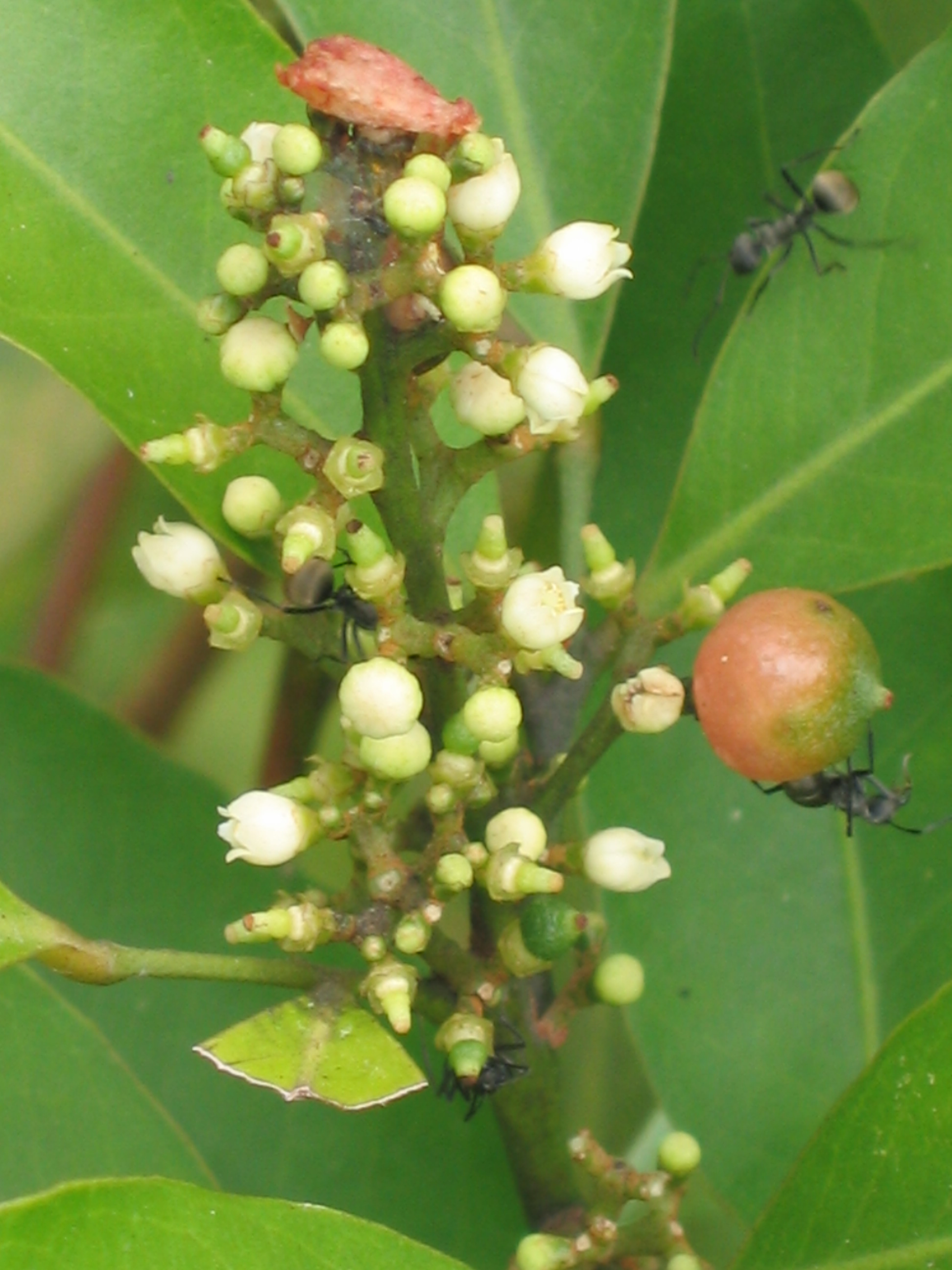

Conservation status
- Least Concern (IUCN 3.1)

Scientific classification
- Kingdom: Plantae
- Clade: Tracheophytes
- Clade: Angiosperms
- Clade: Eudicots
- Clade: Rosids
- Order: Sapindales
- Family: Rutaceae
- Genus: Glycosmis
- Species: G. parviflora

Binomial name
- Glycosmis parviflora (Sims) Little

Synonyms
- Glycosmis americana Sagot ex Oliv. Glycosmis citrifolia (Willd.) Lindl. Glycosmis heterophylla A.Rich. Glycosmis obtusa Miq. Glycosmis parviflora var. obtusa (Miq.) B.C.Stone Glycosmis pentaphylla var. citrifolia (Willd.) Bakh.f. Limonia citrifolia Willd. Limonia parviflora Sims

= Glycosmis parviflora =

Species of fruit and plant

Glycosmis parviflora is a species of flowering plant in the family Rutaceae, known commonly as Chinese glycosmis and Jamaican Mandarin-orange. It occurs in China, Japan, Taiwan, Myanmar and Vietnam. It is widely naturalized in the tropics including in the West Indies. In temperate zones, it can be cultivated indoors as a houseplant.
