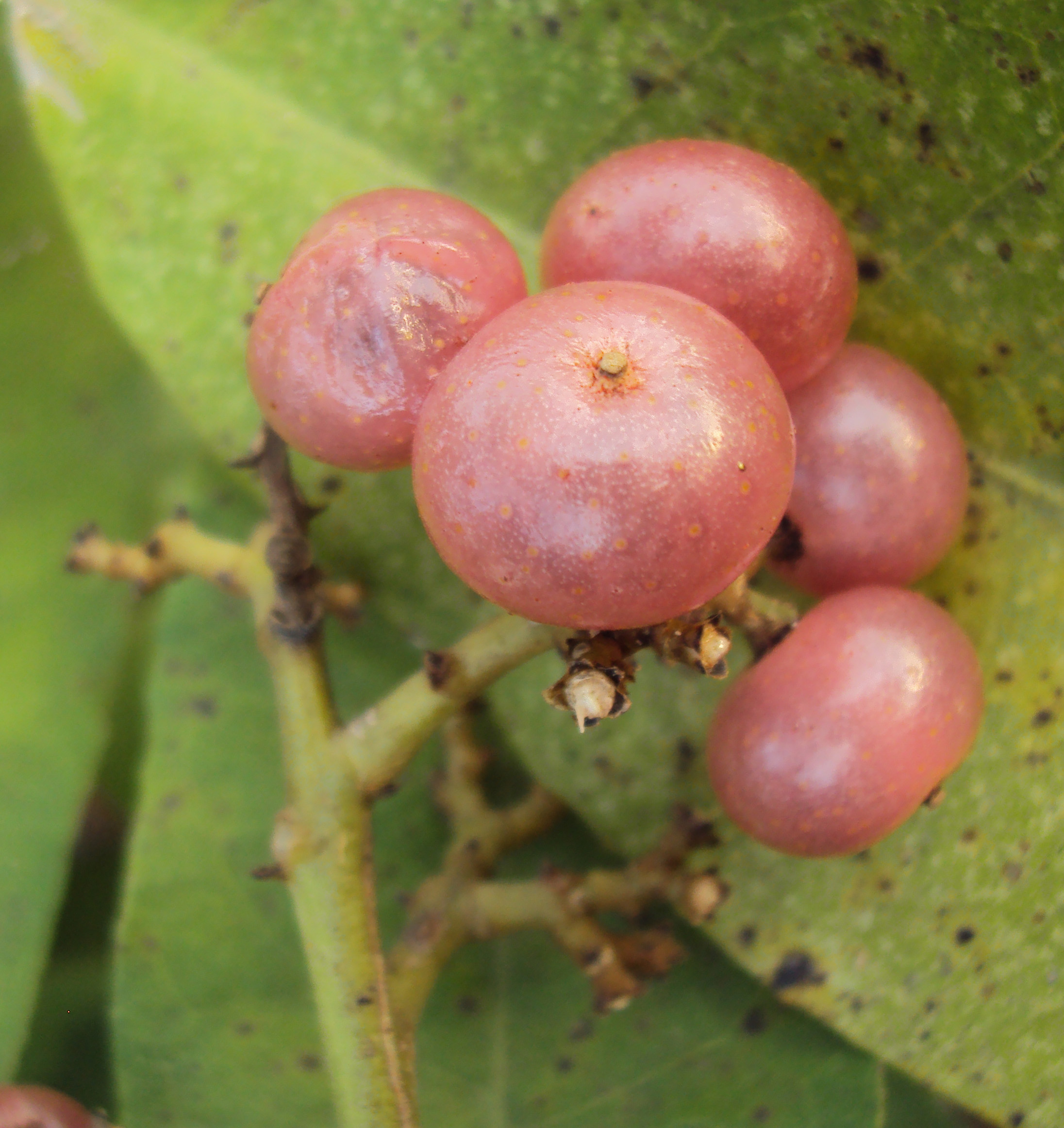
- Glycosmis pentaphylla

Scientific classification
- Kingdom: Plantae
- Clade: Tracheophytes
- Clade: Angiosperms
- Clade: Eudicots
- Clade: Rosids
- Order: Sapindales
- Family: Rutaceae
- Subfamily: Aurantioideae
- Genus: Glycosmis; Corrêa

Species
- See text

Synonyms
- Chionotria Jack; Dioxippe M.Roem.; Myxospermum M.Roem.; Phoenicimon Ridl.; Tetracronia Pierre; Thoreldora Pierre

= Glycosmis =

Genus of flowering plants

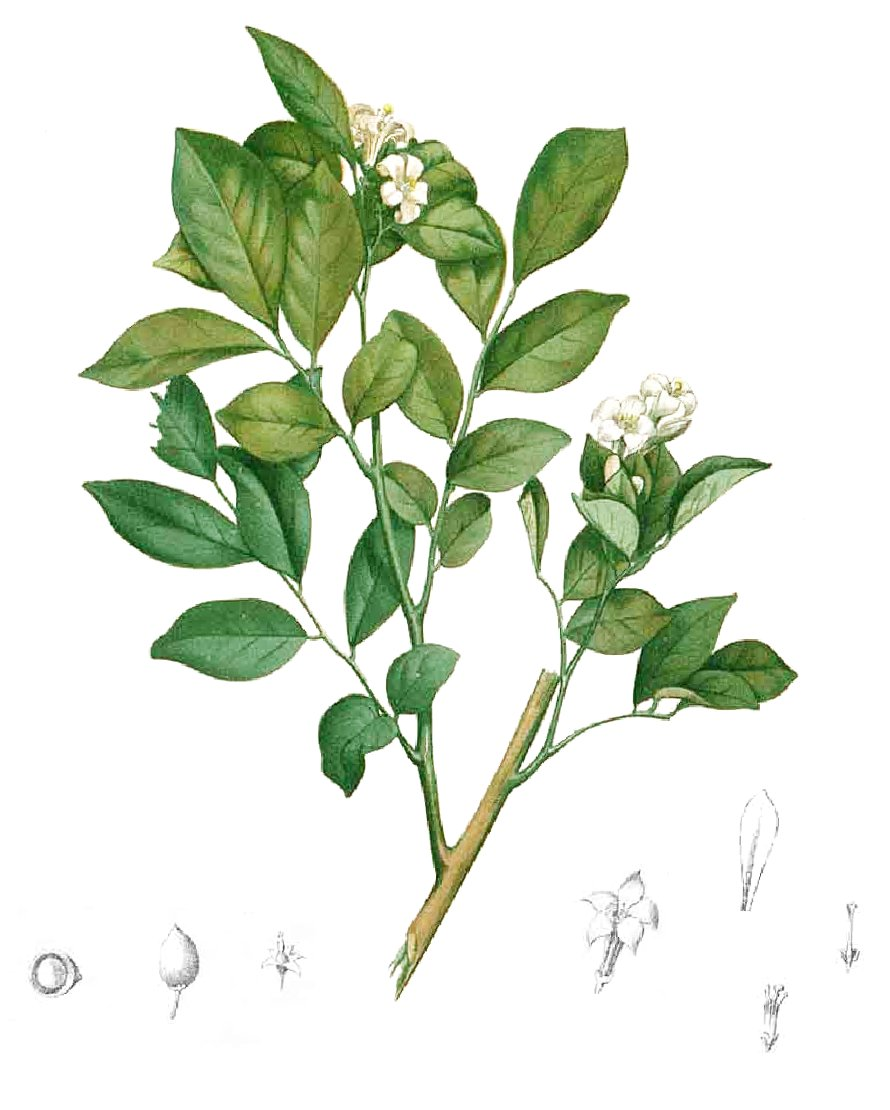
Glycosmis pentaphylla by Francisco Manuel Blanco

Glycosmis is a genus of flowering plants in the citrus family, Rutaceae and tribe Clauseneae. It is in the subfamily Aurantioideae, which also includes genus Citrus. It is a genus of the subtribe Clauseninae, which are known technically as the remote citroid fruit trees.

The distribution of the genus includes Southeast Asia and Australia.

== Description ==
Plants of the genus are shrubs and small trees. New growth is coated densely in rusty hairs. The leaves are simple blades or are divided into narrow leaflets, sometimes pinnately. The small flowers have five white petals and are borne in compound inflorescences. The fruit is a juicy or dry berry. Some species can be variable in appearance.

== Diversity ==
The genus Glycosmis is not well understood and many named species have not been adequately described. Today there are about 35 to over 50 species included in the genus.

Species include:

- Glycosmis aglaioides R.H.Miao
- Glycosmis albicarpa Sujana & Vadhyar
- Glycosmis angustifolia Lindl. ex Wight & Arn.
- Glycosmis borana V.Naray. ex Tanaka
- Glycosmis chlorosperma (Blume) Spreng.
- Glycosmis cochinchinensis (Lour.) Pierre ex Engl.
- Glycosmis collina B.C.Stone
- Glycosmis craibii Tanaka
- Glycosmis crassifolia Ridl.
- Glycosmis cyanocarpa (Blume) Spreng.
- Glycosmis cymosa (Kurz) V.Naray.
- Glycosmis decipiens B.C.Stone
- Glycosmis dinhensis Pierre ex Guillaumin
- Glycosmis elongata Bakh.f.
- Glycosmis erythrocarpa (Hayata) Hayata – red-tangerine
- Glycosmis esquirolii (H.Lév.) Tanaka
- Glycosmis gracilis B.C.Stone
- Glycosmis greenei Elmer
- Glycosmis lanceolata (Blume) D.Dietr.
- Glycosmis longipes (Craib) Tanaka
- Glycosmis longipetala F.J.Mou & D.X.Zhang
- Glycosmis longisepala B.C.Stone
- Glycosmis macrantha Merr.
- Glycosmis macrocarpa Wight
- Glycosmis macrophylla (Blume) Miq.
- Glycosmis mansiana V.Naray.
- Glycosmis mauritiana (Lam.) Tanaka
- Glycosmis nelliyampathiensis Jabeena & Maya
- Glycosmis oligantha C.C.Huang
- Glycosmis ovoidea Pierre
- Glycosmis parkinsonii Yu.Tanaka
- Glycosmis parva Craib
- Glycosmis parviflora (Sims) Little – Chinese glycosmis
- Glycosmis pentaphylla (Retz.) DC. – orangeberry, gin berry
- Glycosmis perakensis V.Naray.
- Glycosmis petelotii Guillaumin
- Glycosmis pierrei Tanaka
- Glycosmis pilosa V.Naray.
- Glycosmis pseudoracemosa Swingle
- Glycosmis pseudosapindoides V.Naray.
- Glycosmis puberula Lindl. ex Oliv.
- Glycosmis singuliflora Kurz
- Glycosmis stenura B.C.Stone
- Glycosmis suberosa H.Toyama & Rueangr.
- Glycosmis subopposita Miq.
- Glycosmis sumatrana Ridl.
- Glycosmis superba B.C.Stone
- Glycosmis tetracronia B.C.Stone
- Glycosmis tirunelveliensis Murugan & Manickam
- Glycosmis tomentella Ridl.
- Glycosmis trichanthera Guillaumin
- Glycosmis trifoliata (Blume) Spreng. – pink-fruit glycosmis
- Glycosmis xizangensis (C.Y.Wu & H.Li) D.D.Tao
