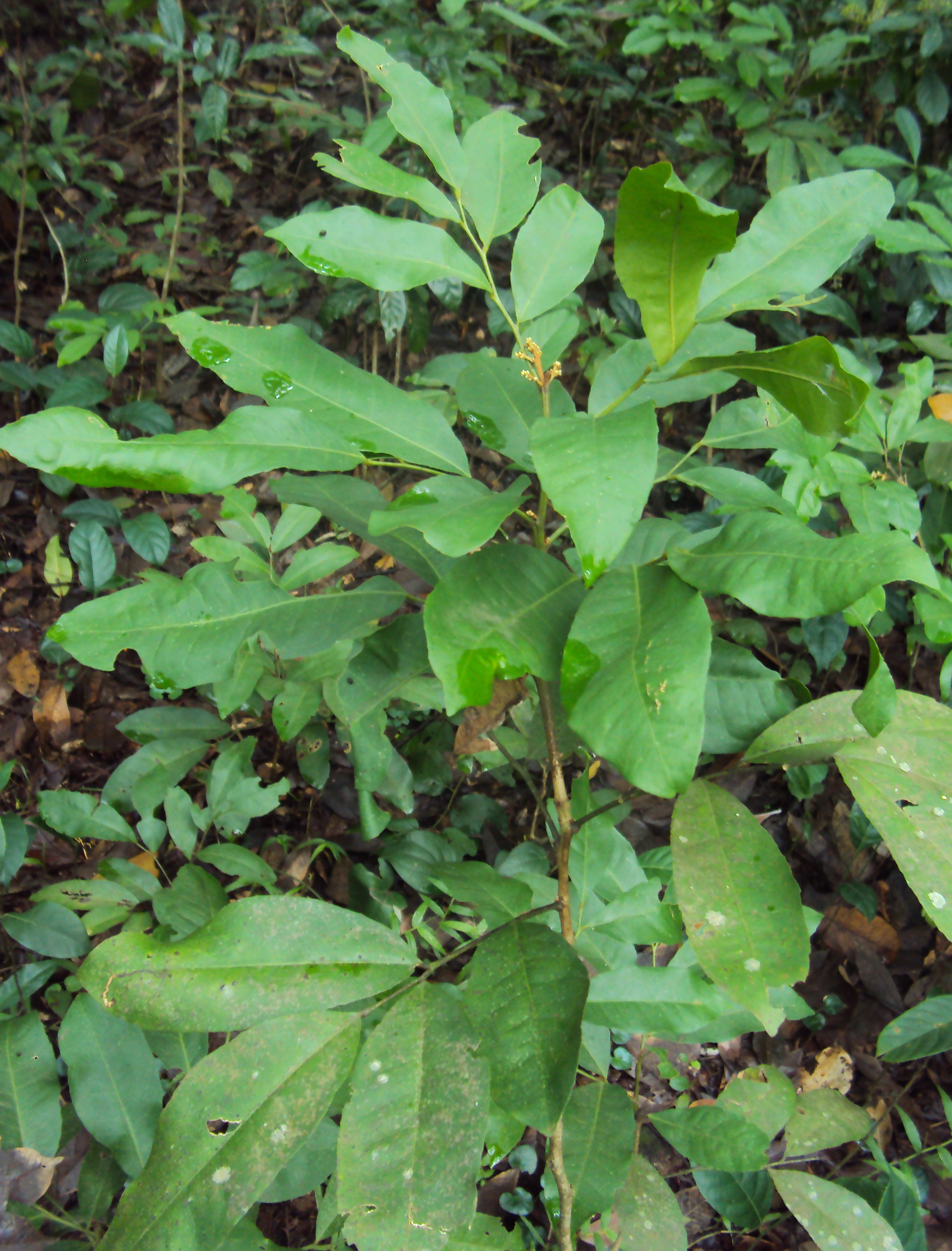

Conservation status
- Least Concern (IUCN 3.1)

Scientific classification
- Kingdom: Plantae
- Clade: Tracheophytes
- Clade: Angiosperms
- Clade: Eudicots
- Clade: Rosids
- Order: Sapindales
- Family: Rutaceae
- Genus: Glycosmis
- Species: G. pentaphylla

Binomial name
- Glycosmis pentaphylla (Retz.) DC.

Synonyms
- Bursera nitida Fern.-Vill.; Chionotria monogyna Walp.; C. rigida Jack; Glycosmis arborea (Roxb.) DC.; G. arborea var. linearifoliolata V.Naray.; G. chylocarpa Wight & Arn.; G. madagascariensis Corrêa ex Risso; G. pentaphylla (Retz.) Corrêa; G. pentaphylla var. linearifoliolis Tanaka; G. quinquefolia Griff.; G. retzii M.Roem.; G. rigida (Jack) Merr.; Limonia arborea Roxb.; L. pentaphylla Retz.; Marignia nitida Turcz.; Murraya cerasiformis Blanco; Myxospermum chylocarpum (Wight & Arn.) M.Roem.; Sclerostylis macrophylla Blume

= Glycosmis pentaphylla =

Berry and plant

Glycosmis pentaphylla is a species of flowering plant in the family Rutaceae, known commonly as orangeberry and gin berry. It occurs in Southeast Asia and northern Australia. It is cultivated for its edible pink fruits. In temperate zones, it can be cultivated indoors as a houseplant.

== Images ==
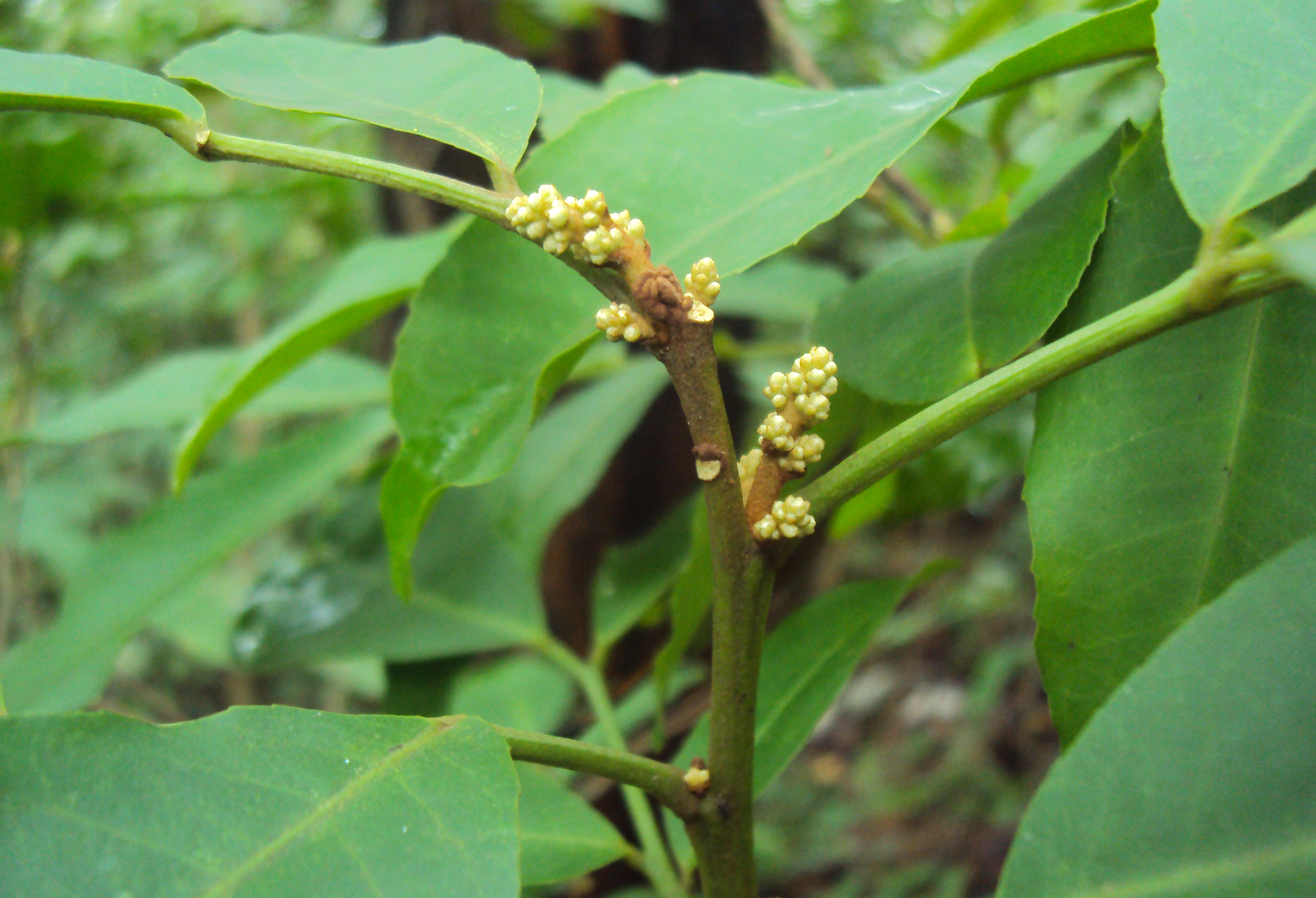
Buds

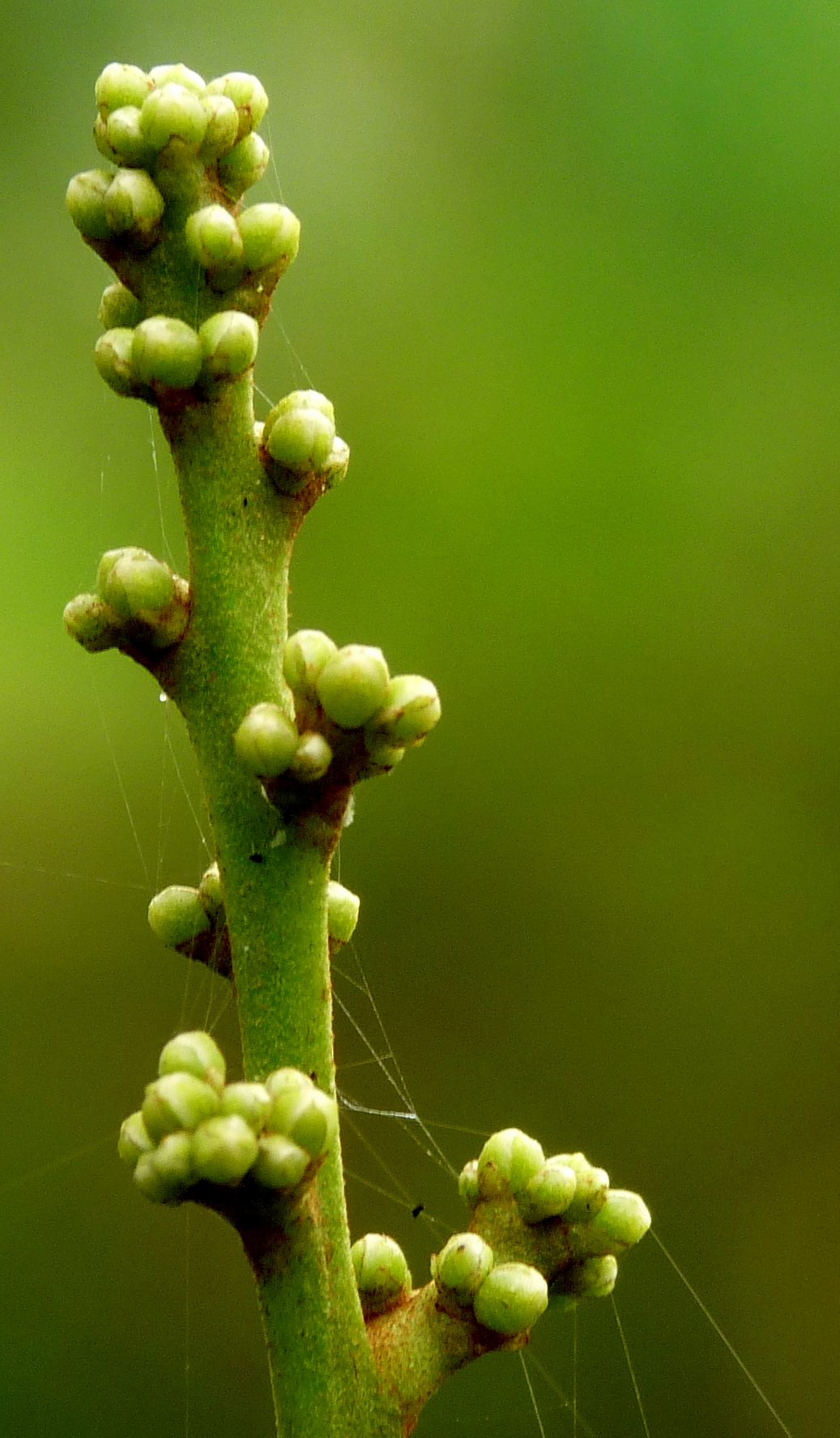
Young berries

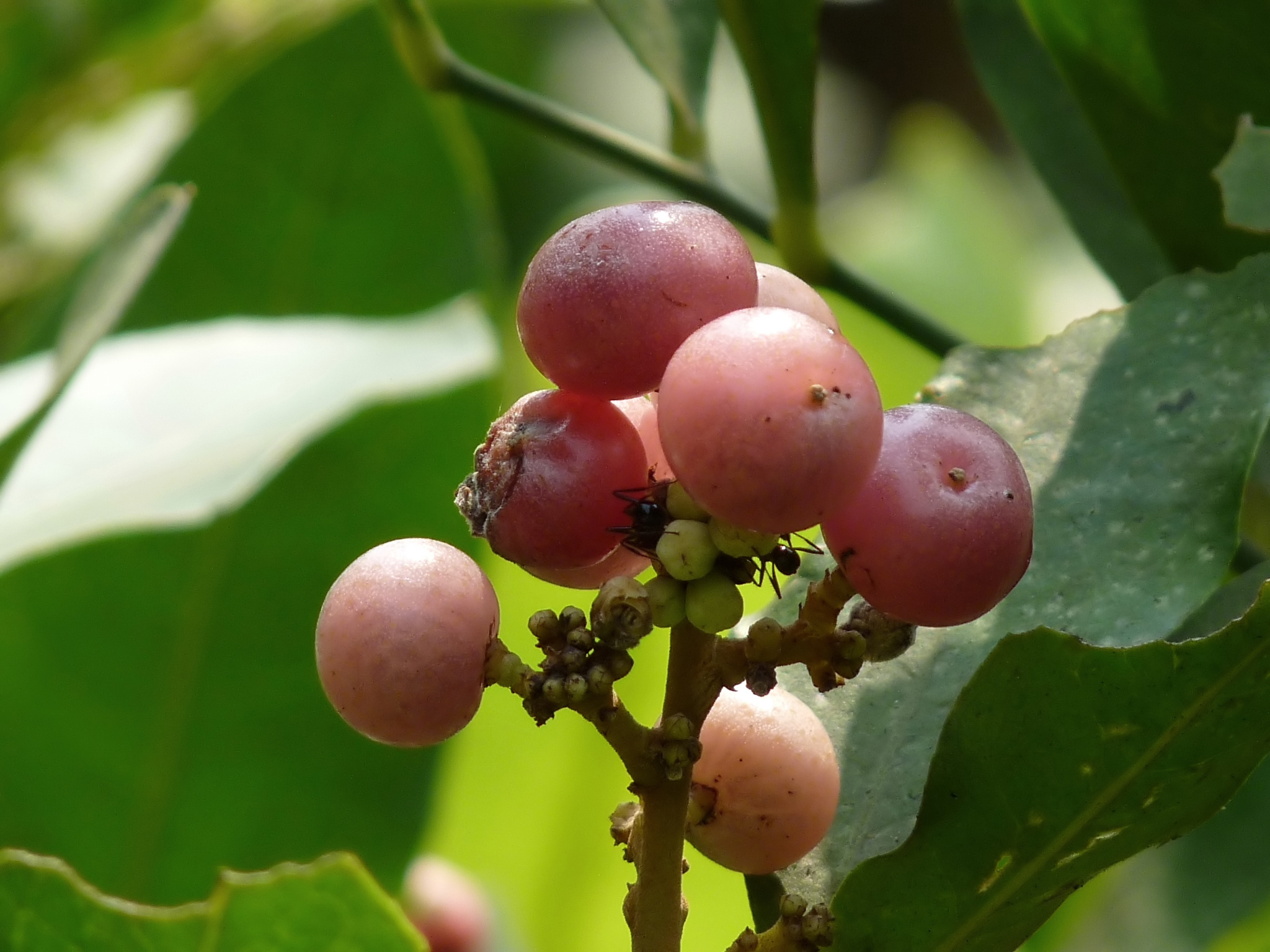
Ripe berries
