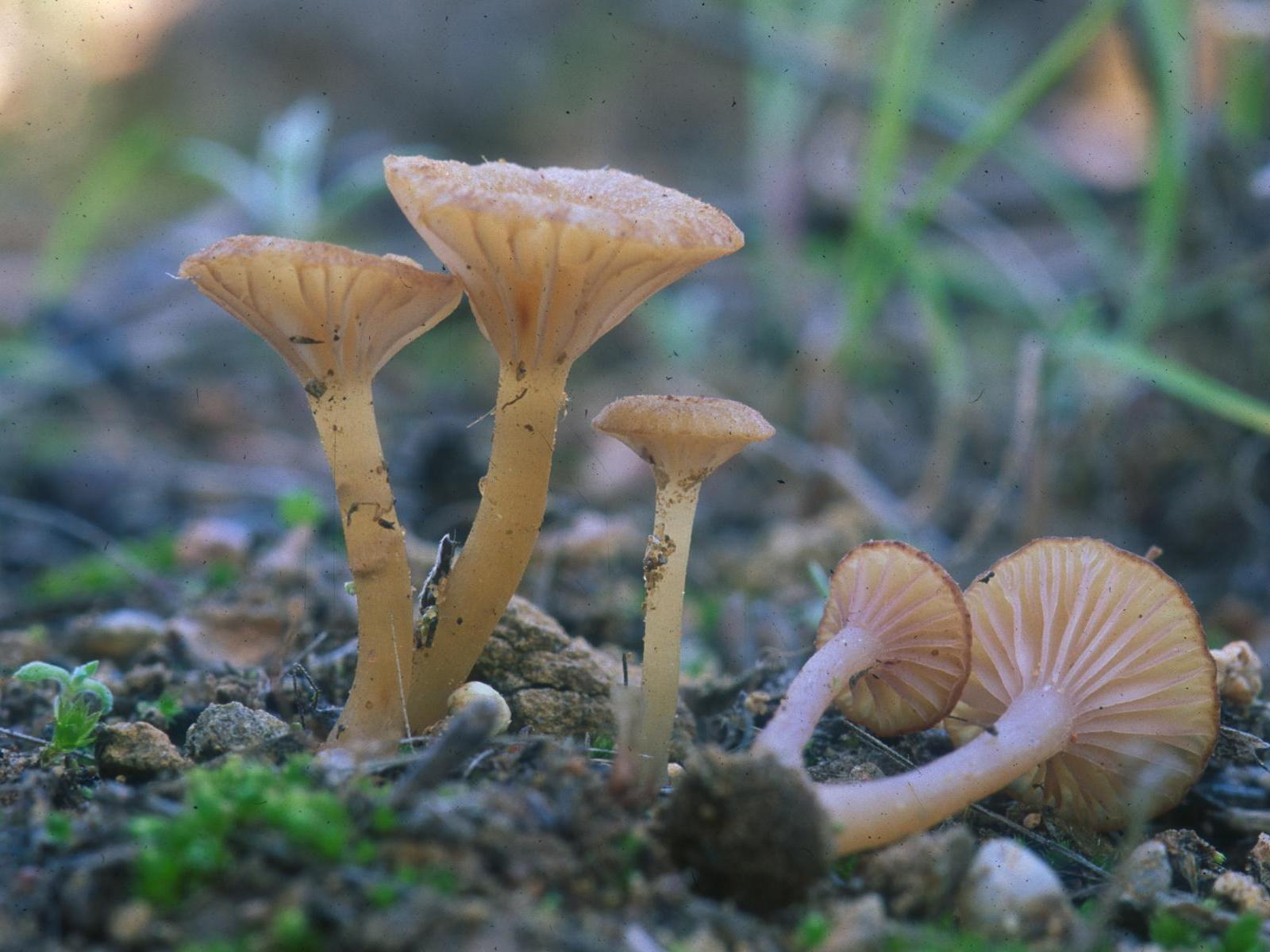
- Contumyces rosellus

Scientific classification
- Kingdom: Fungi
- Division: Basidiomycota
- Class: Agaricomycetes
- Order: Hymenochaetales
- Family: Repetobasidiaceae
- Genus: Contumyces; Redhead, Moncalvo, Vilgalys & Lutzoni (2002)

Type species
- Contumyces rosellus (M.M.Moser) Redhead, Moncalvo, Vilgalys & Lutzoni (2002)

Species
- C. brunneolilacinus C. rosellus C. vesuvianus

= Contumyces =

Genus of fungi

Contumyces is a genus of brightly colored possibly bryophilous or graminicolous agarics in the Hymenochaetales. They have an omphalinoid morphology, and therefore were previously classified in Omphalina. They inhabit mossy or grassy silty or sandy soils in the Northern Hemisphere. Phylogenetically related agarics are in the genera Rickenella, Gyroflexus, Loreleia, Cantharellopsis and Blasiphalia, as well as the stipitate-stereoid genera Muscinupta and Cotylidia and clavarioid genus, Alloclavaria. Contumyces is most similar to Rickenella and Blasiphalia and differs by having its cystidia on the cap, stipe, and hymenium in clusters, whereas in Rickenella and Blasiphalia the cystidia are solitary. Lichenomphalia also may appear similar, but grows on mossy wood.

== Etymology ==
Contumyces is named after the contemporary amateur Italian mycologist, Marco E. Contu (professionally an Italian criminal court judge) and is a replacement for the illegitimate generic name Jacobia, so named after Jakob Emanuel Lange by Contu, but unfortunately a later homonym of Jacobea, a genus of flowering plants. The generic name was erroneously stated to be feminine but is in fact masculine because of the '-myces' base.
