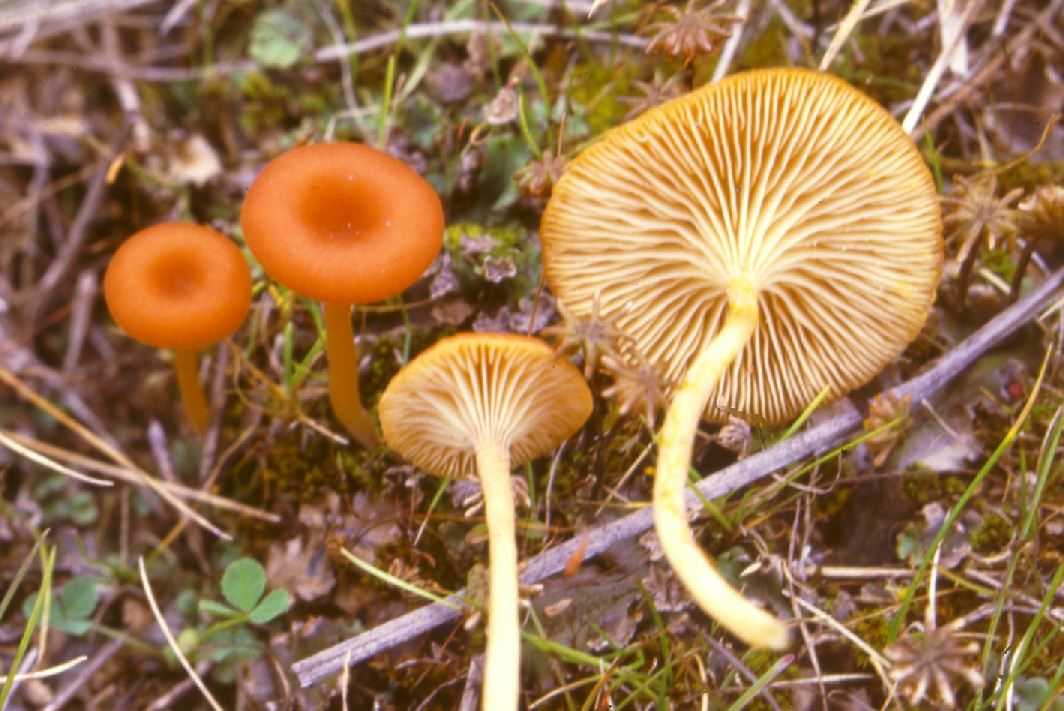
- Loreleia postii

Scientific classification
- Kingdom: Fungi
- Division: Basidiomycota
- Class: Agaricomycetes
- Order: Hymenochaetales
- Family: Repetobasidiaceae
- Genus: Loreleia

Type species
- Loreleia postii (Fr.) Redhead, Moncalvo, Vilgalys & Lutzoni (2002)

Species
- L. marchantiae L. postii L. roseopallida

= Loreleia =

Genus of fungi

Loreleia is a genus of brightly colored agarics in the Hymenochaetales that have an omphalinoid morphology. They inhabit mosses and or liverworts on soil in temperate regions of the Northern Hemisphere. Phylogenetically related agarics are in the genera Contumyces, Gyroflexus, Rickenella, Cantharellopsis and Blasiphalia, as well as the stipitate-stereoid genera Muscinupta and Cotylidia and the clavaroid genus, Alloclavaria. However, the large number of DNA base-pair changes causes a long-branch to form in phylogenetic analyses depicted as cladograms.

In the field, to the eye, Loreleia is most similar to Rickenella because of the orangish colors and omphalinoid shape, but microscopically it differs by the absence of cystidia that in Rickenella make the latter minutely fuzzy as seen with a hand lens. Loreleia penetrates the rhizoids of liverworts and may form a type of symbiosis with them, but in axenic culture tests, L. marchantiae killed Marchantia polymorpha when directly inoculated in contrast to the absence of necrosis in nature in situ. In nature Loreleia often occur in wet areas such as seepages with their hosts, Marchantia.

Older literature often treats the species, like L. postii and L. marchantiae, in the genera Omphalina or Gerronema.

== Etymology ==
Loreleia was named after the American mycologist, Dr. Lorelei L. Norvell (1943-2023), who studied omphalinoid agarics, and who apropos was in turn named after the riverine Lorelei of folklore.
