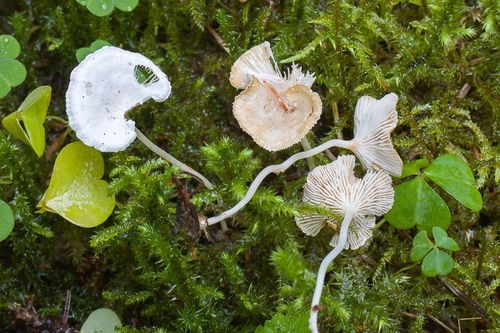
- Cantharellopsis prescotii

Scientific classification
- Kingdom: Fungi
- Division: Basidiomycota
- Class: Agaricomycetes
- Order: Hymenochaetales
- Family: Repetobasidiaceae
- Genus: Cantharellopsis; Kuyper (1986)

Type species
- Cantharellopsis prescotii (Weinm.) Kuyper (1986)

= Cantharellopsis =

Genus of fungi

Cantharellopsis is a tan- to whitish-colored bryophilous monotypic genus in the Hymenochaetales. The fruit bodies of the single species Cantharellopsis prescotii has a form intermediate between an Omphalina and a chanterelle (Cantharellus) because of its forked, fold-like gills. It inhabits moss on calcareous soils in temperate regions of Europe. Phylogenetically related agarics are in the genera Contumyces, Gyroflexus, Loreleia, Rickenella and Blasiphalia, as well as the stipitate-stereoid genera Muscinupta and Cotylidia and the clavarioid genus, Alloclavaria.

== Etymology ==
Cantharellopsis is named in reference to its vague similarity to the genus Cantharellus and means, Cantharellus-like.
