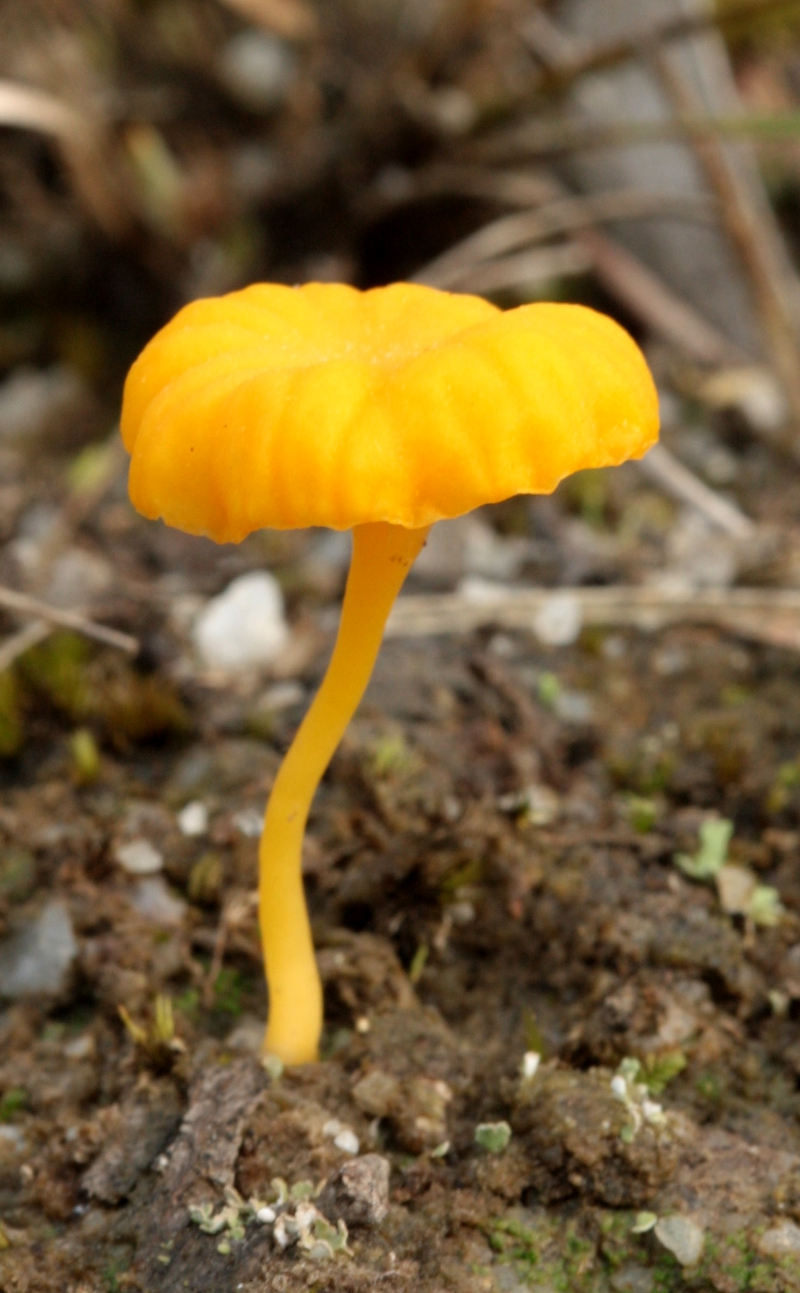

Scientific classification
- Kingdom: Fungi
- Division: Basidiomycota
- Class: Agaricomycetes
- Order: Agaricales
- Family: Hygrophoraceae
- Genus: Lichenomphalia
- Species: L. chromacea

Binomial name
- Lichenomphalia chromacea (Cleland) Redhead, Lutzoni, Moncalvo & Vilgalys (2002)

Synonyms
- Omphalia chromacea Cleland (1924); Botrydina chromacea (Cleland) Redhead & Kuyper (1987); Phytoconis chromacea (Cleland) Redhead & Kuyper (1988); Omphalina chromacea (Cleland) T.W.May & A.E.Wood (1995)

= Lichenomphalia chromacea =

Species of lichen

Lichenomphalia chromacea is a species of basidiolichen in the family Hygrophoraceae. It is found in southern Australia. The yellow-orange fruiting bodies of the species are mushroom-like, with a cap width of typically less than 4 cm (1 1/2 in). The thallus of the lichen is a greenish, granular layer of fungal hyphae and algae on the soil around the base of the stipe.

== Taxonomy ==
The species was first scientifically described as a new species by John Burton Cleland, based on specimens collected from South Australia. In 1978, Scott Redhead and Thomas Kuyper transferred it to the genus Botrydina, and a year later—following changes to the rules for botanical nomenclature—to Phytoconis. Both of these genera have since been synonymized with Lichenomphalia. Tom May and Alec Wood proposed it be classified in Omphalina in 1995. In 2002, the basidiolichen genus Lichenomphalia was circumscribed, and this species was one of several that were transferred to it.

== Description ==
Lichenomphalia chromacea produces yellow to orange mushroom-like fruiting bodies, with a cap diameter between 9 and 38 mm (0.4 and 1.5 in), and a shape that is initially convex and umbilicate, later becoming flattened, but still umbilicate. The thick gills on the underside of the cap are distantly spaced, usually with a decurrent attachment to the stipe, which itself is slender and cylindrical, measuring 19–51 mm (0.7–2.0 in) long. The basidia are usually four-spored, but very rarely they are two-spored. The basidiospores are hyaline, ellipsoid, and measure 6.4–10.4 by 3.4–6.2 μm. The thallus of the lichen is disc-shaped to angular, measuring 200–900 μm broad and forming a green, crust-like surface when crowded together.

== Habitat and distribution ==
Lichenomphalia chromacea occurs in South Australia, New South Wales, and Tasmania. It fruits in clusters on the ground, or occasionally on bark, and often amongst mosses. In Tasmania, it is typically encountered in sandy or peaty soil in heathland and woodland, and usually at higher elevations. The only other members of genus Lichenomphalia that occur in Australia are L. tasmanica and L. umbellifera.
