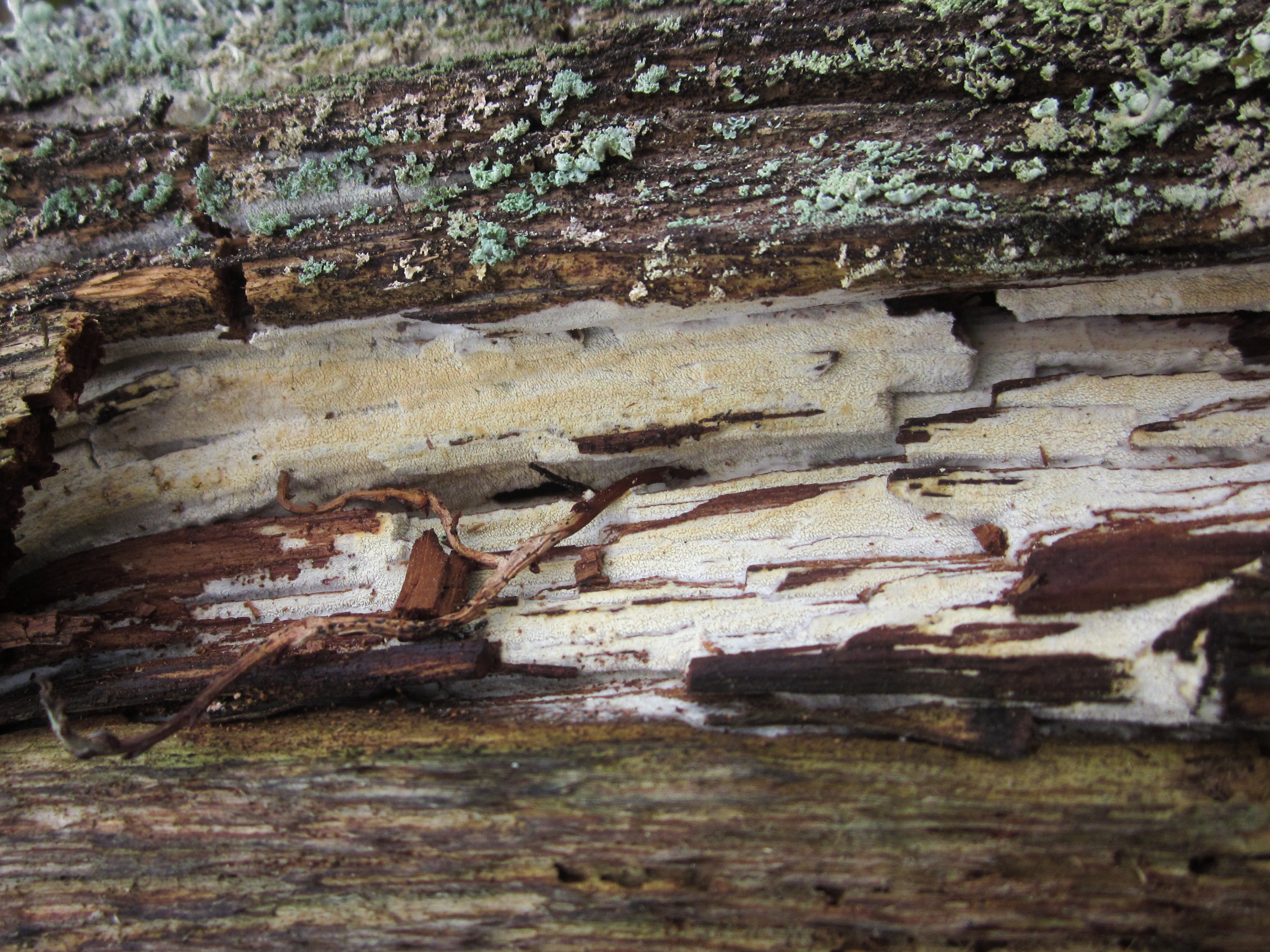

Scientific classification
- Domain: Eukaryota
- Kingdom: Fungi
- Division: Basidiomycota
- Class: Agaricomycetes
- Order: Hymenochaetales
- Family: Rickenellaceae
- Genus: Odonticium
- Species: O. romellii

Binomial name
- Odonticium romellii (S.Lundell) Parmasto

= Odonticium romellii =

Species of fungus

Odonticium romellii is a species of fungus belonging to the family Rickenellaceae.

It is native to Europe and Northern America.
