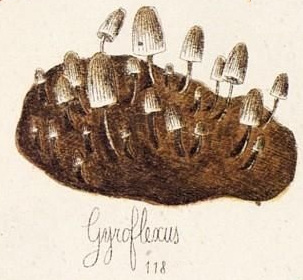

Scientific classification
- Kingdom: Fungi
- Division: Basidiomycota
- Class: Agaricomycetes
- Order: Hymenochaetales
- Family: Repetobasidiaceae
- Genus: Gyroflexus; Raithelh. (1981)

Type species
- Gyroflexus brevibasidiatus (Singer) Raithelh. (1981)

= Gyroflexus =

Genus of fungi

Gyroflexus is a monotypic genus with a yellowish-ivory colored omphalinoid agaric in the Hymenochaetales that grows on living Sphagnum. Phylogenetically related agarics are in the genera Rickenella, Blasiphalia, Loreleia, Cantharellopsis and Contumyces, as well as the stipitate-stereoid genera Muscinupta and Cotylidia and clavaroid genus, Alloclavaria. Gyroflexus brevibasidiatus, the type, amongst the vaguely omphalinoid genera is distinguished by its small, mammiform pileus, growth on Sphagnum, and lack of cystidia.

== Etymology ==
The etymology of the name Gyroflexus is not known. When coined in a prepublication advertisement, it clearly was intended to be applied to several species, although only one, the type was included.
