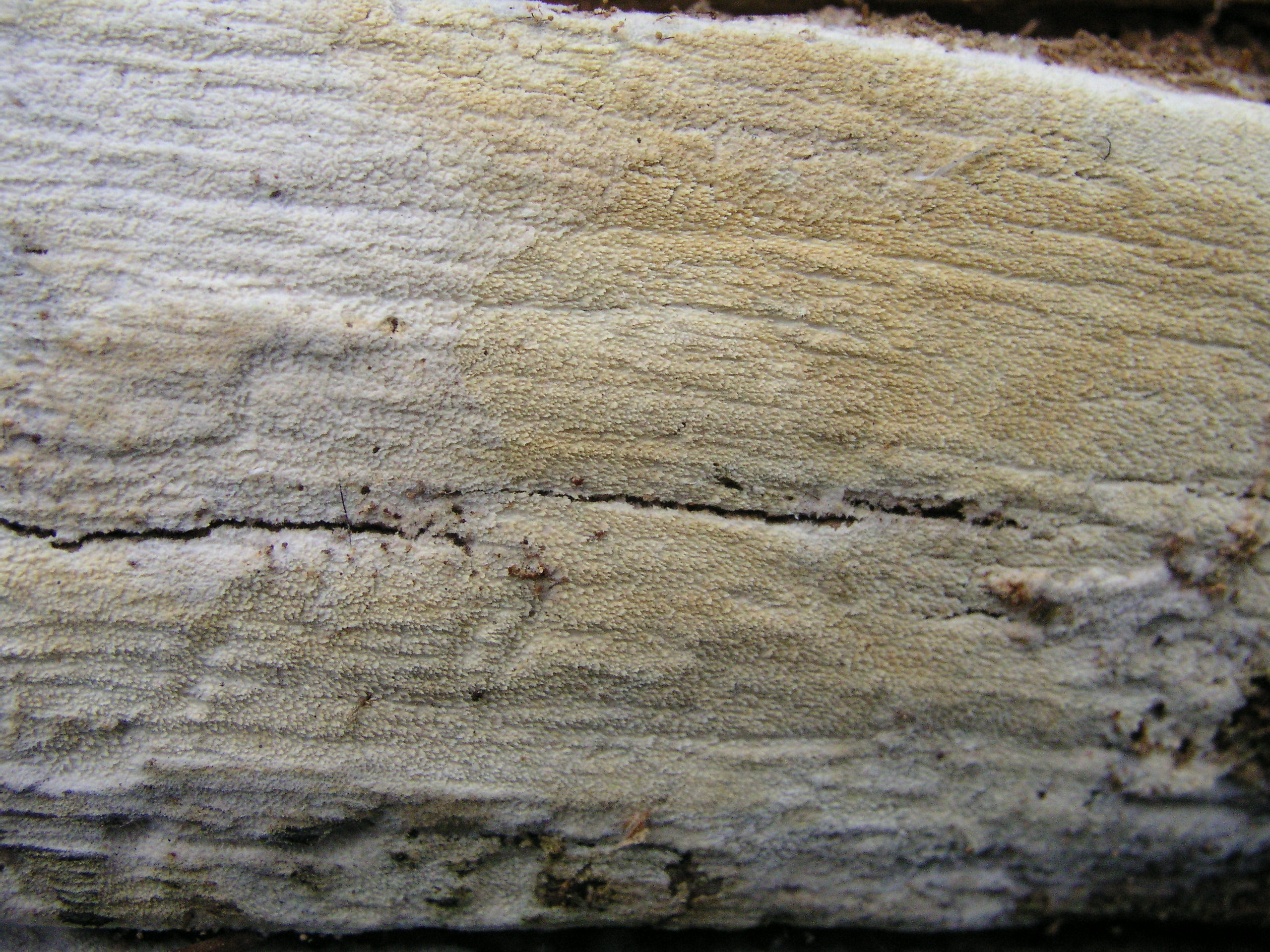
- Odonticium romellii

Scientific classification
- Kingdom: Fungi
- Division: Basidiomycota
- Class: Agaricomycetes
- Order: Hymenochaetales
- Family: Rickenellaceae
- Genus: Odonticium; Parmasto

= Odonticium =

Genus of fungi

Odonticium is a genus of fungi belonging to the family Rickenellaceae.

The genus was first described by Erast Parmasto in 1968.

The genus has cosmopolitan distribution.

Species:

- Odonticium romellii (S.Lundell) Parmasto
