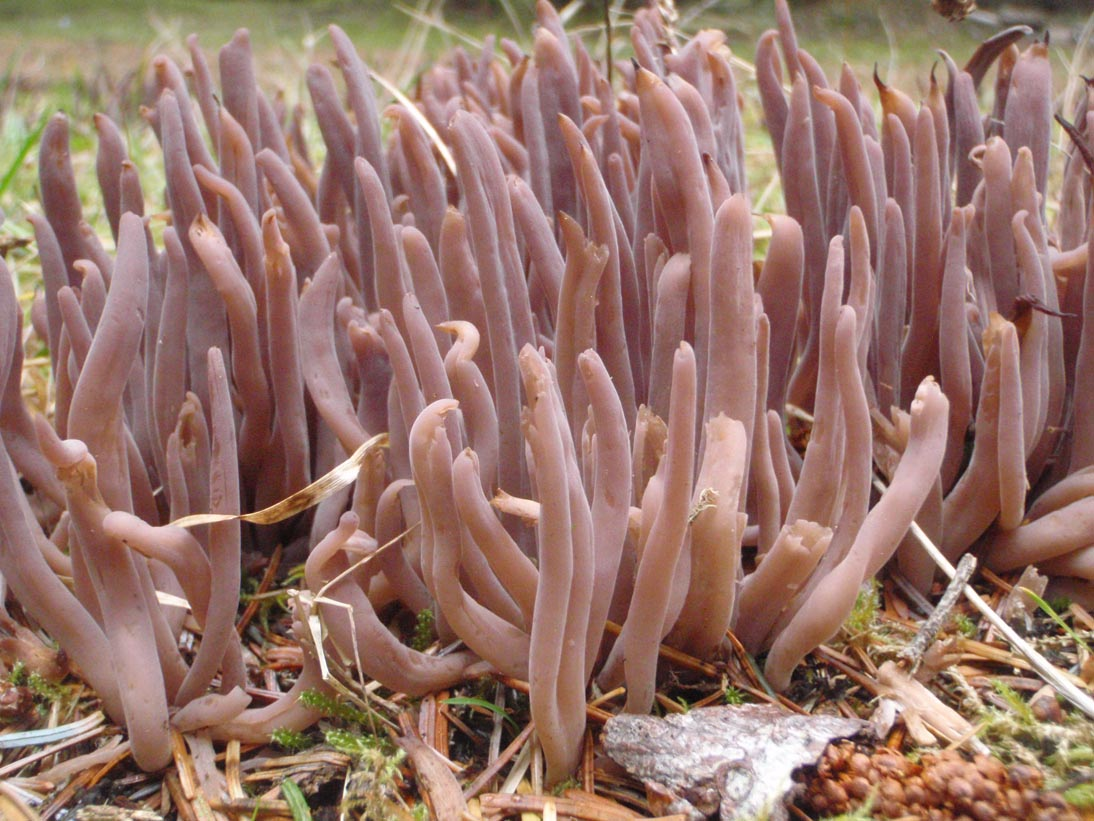

Scientific classification
- Domain: Eukaryota
- Kingdom: Fungi
- Division: Basidiomycota
- Class: Agaricomycetes
- Order: Hymenochaetales
- Family: Repetobasidiaceae
- Genus: Alloclavaria

Type species
- Alloclavaria purpurea (Fr.: Fr.) Dentinger & McLaughlin

= Alloclavaria =

Genus of fungi

Alloclavaria is a clavarioid genus in the Hymenochaetales recently segregated from Clavaria by molecular analysis. Phylogenetically related fungi are in the agaricoid genera Rickenella, Contumyces, Gyroflexus, Loreleia, Cantharellopsis and Blasiphalia, as well as the stipitate stereoid genera Cotylidia and Muscinupta. The only species as yet placed in Alloclavaria is the type, formerly known as Clavaria purpurea under which name it is often cited or illustrated.. It is suspected, via circumstantial evidence, i.e. habitat, but not proven, that Alloclavaria is mycorrhizal.

== Etymology ==
Alloclavaria means "the other Clavaria", a reference to the fact it was segregated from Clavaria which was shown to be a member of the Agaricales through phylogenetic analysis of the DNA.
