= Blasiphalia =

Scientific classification
- Kingdom: Fungi
- Division: Basidiomycota
- Class: Agaricomycetes
- Order: Hymenochaetales
- Family: Repetobasidiaceae
- Genus: Blasiphalia; Redhead (2007)

Type species
- Blasiphalia pseudogrisella (A.H.Sm.) Redhead (2007)

Genus of fungi

Blasiphalia is a fungal genus in the family Repetobasidiaceae. A monotypic genus, it contains the honey colored omphalinoid agaric , Blasiphalia pseudogrisella, which grows with the liverwort genus Blasia. Phylogenetically related agarics are in the genera Rickenella, Gyroflexus, Loreleia, Cantharellopsis and Contumyces, as well as the stipitate-stereoid genera Muscinupta and Cotylidia and clavarioid genus, Alloclavaria. Blasiphalia is most similar to Rickenella and Contumyces, and was only just recognized as a distinct genus in 2007 based upon molecular analysis. The fungus is unique in parasitizing Blasia by forming clasping appresoria on its host's rhizoids. Its basidiospores also germinate on the host's gemmae and clasp them and therefore can be disseminated together with the gemmae.

== Etymology ==
Blasiphalia is a nonsense, nontraditionally formulated name vaguely referring to the liverwort genus Blasia and a fragment of the word 'omphalia' in reference to previous classifications that would place it in Omphalina.
