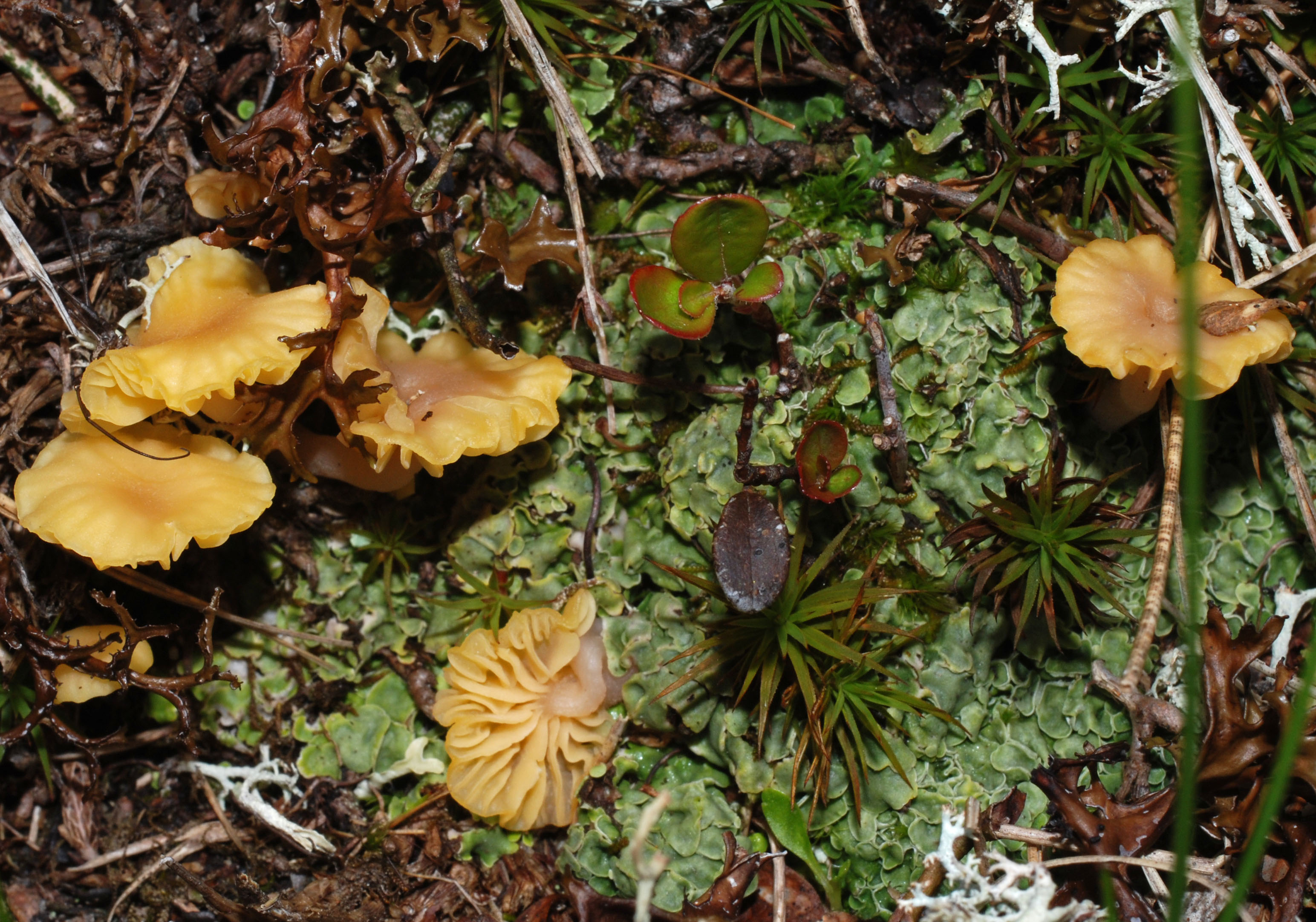
- in Carinthia, Austria

Scientific classification
- Domain: Eukaryota
- Kingdom: Fungi
- Division: Basidiomycota
- Class: Agaricomycetes
- Order: Agaricales
- Family: Hygrophoraceae
- Genus: Lichenomphalia
- Species: L. hudsoniana

Binomial name
- Lichenomphalia hudsoniana (H.S.Jenn.) Redhead, Lutzoni, Moncalvo & Vilgalys (2002)

Synonyms
- List: Hygrophorus hudsonianus H.S.Jenn. (1936); Clitocybe hudsoniana (H.S.Jenn.) H.E.Bigelow (1960); Omphalina hudsoniana (H.S.Jenn.) H.E.Bigelow (1970); Gerronema hudsonianum (H.S.Jenn.) Singer (1970); Phytoconis hudsoniana (H.S.Jenn.) Redhead & Kuyper (1988); Endocarpon viride Ach. (1810); Lichen hepaticus * viride (Ach.) Lam. (1813); Dermatocarpon viride (Ach.) W.Mann (1825); Verrucaria laetevirens Borrer (1831); Normandina viridis (Ach.) Nyl. (1855); Lenormandia viridis (Ach.) Arnold (1859); Normandina jungermanniae f. viridis (Ach.) Anzi (1860); Coriscium viride (Ach.) Vain. (1890); Botrydina viridis (Ach.) Redhead & Kuyper (1987); Phytoconis viridis (Ach.) Redhead & Kuyper (1988); Endocarpon laetevirens (Borrer) Taylor (1836); Solorina saccata f. laetevirens (Borrer) Schaer. (1850); Lenormandia laetevirens (Borrer) Nyl. (1861); Normandina laetevirens (Borrer) Nyl. (1861); Normandina davidis Hue (1889); Omphalia luteolilacina J.Favre (1955); Omphalina luteolilacina (J.Favre) D.M.Hend. (1958)

= Lichenomphalia hudsoniana =

Species of lichen

Lichenomphalia hudsoniana is a species of basidiolichen in the family Hygrophoraceae. It is widely distributed in alpine and arctic regions of the world, where it grows on moist soil amongst moss.

== Taxonomy ==
The species was first formally described as a new to science in 1936 by American mycologist Herbert Spencer Jennings, as a member of genus Hygrophorus. The type specimen was collected by George M. Sutton from Southampton Island in 1930, where he found them growing in the brown peaty parts of the moss Dicranum fuscescens. The taxon has been transferred to several genera in its taxonomic history, including Clitocybe, Omphalina, Gerronema, and Phytoconis. It was placed in Lichenomphalia in 2002 following a molecular phylogenetic-based revision of omphalinoid-like genera in the Agaricales.

== Description ==
The vegetative thallus of Lichenomphalia hudsoniana comprises green to dark green, rounded squamules (scales) (known as the "Coriscium type") measuring 2–10 mm in diameter. The basidiolichen produces smooth, yellowish, mushroom-like fruitbodies 0.5–3 cm (0.2–1.2 in) in diameter. When moist, they have a rubbery or cartilaginous texture and a viscid colour; this colour fades to pale yellow when dry. The gills on the underside of the cap are somewhat curved or arched (arcuate), and strongly decurrent; they are spaced apart distantly and have veins in the spaces between the gills (intervenose). The cartilaginous stipe is hollow, measuring 1–2.5 cm (0.4–1.0 in) long and 1.5–2 mm thick. Spores are smooth, ellipsoid, hyaline, and measure 4–5 by 5–8 μm.

== Habitat and distribution ==
Lichenomphalia hudsoniana is one of the most common and widely distributed members of its genus, and can use a variety of substrates for growth. It occurs in Asia, Europe, and North America, largely in alpine and arctic regions, but is also known from areas near the ocean in Norway and Great Britain. The preferred habitat for this basidiolichen is damp soil amongst mosses, and in bogs; less frequently it is recorded growing on decaying tree bark in shaded areas.
