= Lichenomphalia meridionalis =

Scientific classification
- Kingdom: Fungi
- Division: Basidiomycota
- Class: Agaricomycetes
- Order: Agaricales
- Family: Hygrophoraceae
- Genus: Lichenomphalia
- Species: L. meridionalis

Binomial name
- Lichenomphalia meridionalis (Contu & La Rocca) P.-A.Moreau & Courtec. (2008)

Synonyms
- Omphalina meridionalis Contu & La Rocca (1999); Lichenomphalia meridionalis (Contu & La Rocca) Barrasa (2009)

Species of lichen-forming fungus

Lichenomphalia meridionalis is a species of basidiolichen-forming fungus in the family Hygrophoraceae. It was first described in 1999 from Sardinia and was long confused with the similar L. velutina, from which it can be distinguished by its paler fruiting bodies and the absence of dark striped pigment on the cap surface. The fungus produces small green globules containing Coccomyxa algae, and its mushroom-like fruiting bodies have caps up to mm wide that range from ochraceous to brown. It grows on bare or mossy acid soil in oak woodland and shrub vegetation, typically at humid montane sites. The species is known from the western Mediterranean (Spain, Sardinia, Corsica, and Lesvos), Hungary, and from central Japan, where a study confirmed its identity using molecular data.

== Taxonomy ==
The species was described in 1999 by Marco Contu and Salvatore La Rocca as Omphalina meridionalis, from specimens collected in Sardinia. As lichenized omphalinoid agarics came to be treated as a separate genus, it was transferred to Lichenomphalia by Pierre-Arthur Moreau and Régis Courtecuisse in 2008. Barrasa, Esteve-Raventós, and Rico published the same combination in 2009, but the 2008 combination has priority and provides the correct authorship for the name.

Re-examination of the type specimen and Spanish material showed that the original description had overstated some characters, as the species lacked clamps in the material then studied and could have four-spored (tetrasporic), two-spored, or occasionally one-spored basidia rather than only tetrasporic basidia. It was long confused with L. velutina and other lichenized omphalinoid fungi, but later authors retained it as a distinct species on the basis of its paler fruiting bodies, pale gills, non-zebroid pileipellis pigment, and spore shape. Later molecular studies provided the first DNA data for the species and supported the identification of both Spanish and Japanese material as L. meridionalis.

== Description ==
The thallus of Lichenomphalia meridionalis is a Botrydina-type structure consisting of small green to dark-green globules, typically 20–55 micrometres (μm) in diameter but sometimes reaching 80 μm. Each globule contains Coccomyxa algae cells enclosed by fungal hyphae. The basidiomata (fruiting bodies) are small and omphalinoid in shape. The caps are 3.5–10 mm wide, convex to flattened or slightly depressed, and translucent-striate. They range in colour from ochraceous to yellowish red, light brown, or brown, and often become paler with age or when dried. The gills are widely spaced (distant) and run down the stem (decurrent), typically whitish to pale greyish white or sometimes matching the cap colour. The stipe (stem) is slender, 5–20 mm long, covered in fine short hairs (densely velutinous or pubescent), and white-tomentose at the base where it connects to the thallus. Under the microscope, the pileipellis (cap surface) consists of cylindrical hyphae with club-shaped (clavate) tips, arranged in a cutis to subtrichodermium (a layer of hyphae lying flat to slightly upright). Cystidia are absent, and the basidia (spore-bearing cells) are mostly four-spored, though they may also bear two spores or, rarely, just one. The basidiospores are colourless (hyaline), thin-walled, inamyloid (not staining with iodine), and ellipsoid to cylindrical or elongate in shape, with a prominent apiculus (a small projection at the point of attachment). Most tissues lack clamp connections, though specimens from Japan have shown them in some of the hyphae connecting thallus globules.

A diagnostic feature of L. meridionalis is the faintly encrusting pigment of the pileipellis, which does not form the dark zebroid stripes seen in L. velutina. This non-zebroid pigment pattern is one of the characters most often used to separate the species from similar lichenized omphalinoid agarics.

== Habitat and distribution ==
Lichenomphalia meridionalis grows on bare or mossy acid soil, often on slopes, road banks, or open ground in oak woodland and shrub vegetation, including sites with Cistus, Calluna vulgaris, Quercus pyrenaica, and Quercus ilex. In the Iberian Peninsula it has been treated as a Mediterranean species of humid montane sites, especially in the mesomediterranean and supramediterranean elevation belts, and Spanish material studied for symbiont composition came from 533 to 2,200 m elevation. Fruiting bodies have been recorded in cool, moist parts of the year, especially winter, spring, and autumn. The species was first described from Sardinia and is now known from Spain, Corsica, Greece (Lesvos), and central Japan, where it occurs on Andosols along montane to subalpine road banks at about 1,200–1,900 m elevation. It was documented for the first time from Middle Europe in 2020, when it was recorded from Hungary. A study of Spanish populations found that the fungus associates with two strains of Coccomyxa subellipsoidea that are distributed in part by altitude, and that one of those algal strains consistently occurred with cyanobacteria in the thallus.
