= Lichenomphalia aurantiaca =

Conservation status
- Endangered (IUCN 3.1)

Scientific classification
- Kingdom: Fungi
- Division: Basidiomycota
- Class: Agaricomycetes
- Order: Agaricales
- Family: Hygrophoraceae
- Genus: Lichenomphalia
- Species: L. aurantiaca

Binomial name
- Lichenomphalia aurantiaca (Redhead & Kuyper) Redhead, Lutzoni, Moncalvo & Vilgalys (2002)

Synonyms
- Botrydina aurantiaca Redhead & Kuyper (1987); Phytoconis aurantiaca (Redhead & Kuyper) Redhead & Kuyper (1988); Omphalina aurantiaca (Redhead & Kuyper) Barrasa & Esteve-Rav. (2000)

Species of lichen

Lichenomphalia aurantiaca is a species of agaricoid (mushroom-like) basidiolichen in the family Hygrophoraceae. It is found in Colombia. This unusual lichen produces both a minute granular thallus scattered over soil and tiny bright orange mushrooms with caps 10–15 mm across, gills, and stems that are the same vivid orange colour throughout. Originally described in 1987, it is classified as an endangered species due to its extremely limited distribution in Colombia's high-elevation páramo ecosystems.

== Taxonomy ==
The lichen was first scientifically described as a new species in 1987 by the mycologists Scott Redhead and Thomas Wilhelmus Kuyper, who originally classified it in the genus Botrydina. After proposed transfers to the genera Phytoconis and Omphalina, it was reclassified in Lichenomphalia in 2002, as part of a restructuring of the core omphalinoid genera in the Agaricales.

== Description ==
Lichenomphalia aurantiaca is a basidiolichen—a lichen whose fungal partner belongs to the mushroom-forming group of fungi. It therefore has two growth forms: a minute, granular thallus that houses the algal partner at ground level, and tiny orange fruit bodies that look like conventional mushrooms. The thallus consists of spherical granules that are 40–135 micrometres (μm) across, scattered loosely over soil or among mosses around the base of the fruit bodies. Each granule is a composite of algal cells enveloped by fungal hyphae and is barely visible without magnification.

The mushroom stage is equally small. The cap (technically called the pileus) is convex, sometimes with a shallow central dimple (umbilicate), and measures 10–15 mm in diameter. Its surface is smooth but can show faint radial grooves near the margin and is coloured bright orange throughout. Radiating from the cap underside are widely spaced, slightly arched gills (lamellae) that share the same salmon-orange tone.

The stem (stipe) is 9–19 mm long, 1–2 mm thick, smooth and the same orange shade as the cap. Like other members of the genus, the hyphae lack clamp connections (minute loop-like joints that some basidiomycetes use to keep nuclei in balance).

Microscopically, the spore-bearing cells (basidia) are club-shaped and usually produce two basidiospores, though one, three or four spores may occur on a single basidium. They measure 29–37 × 6.5–8.8 μm. The resulting basidiospores are broadly ellipsoidal to almost spherical, thin-walled, 8–10 × 5.5–6.9 μm, and remain a pale orange colour.

== Conservation ==
In terms of its conservation status, Lichenomphalia aurantiaca has been assessed as an endangered species by the International Union for Conservation of Nature because of its extremely limited distribution and fragmented populations, restricted to high-elevation páramo in Colombia.
