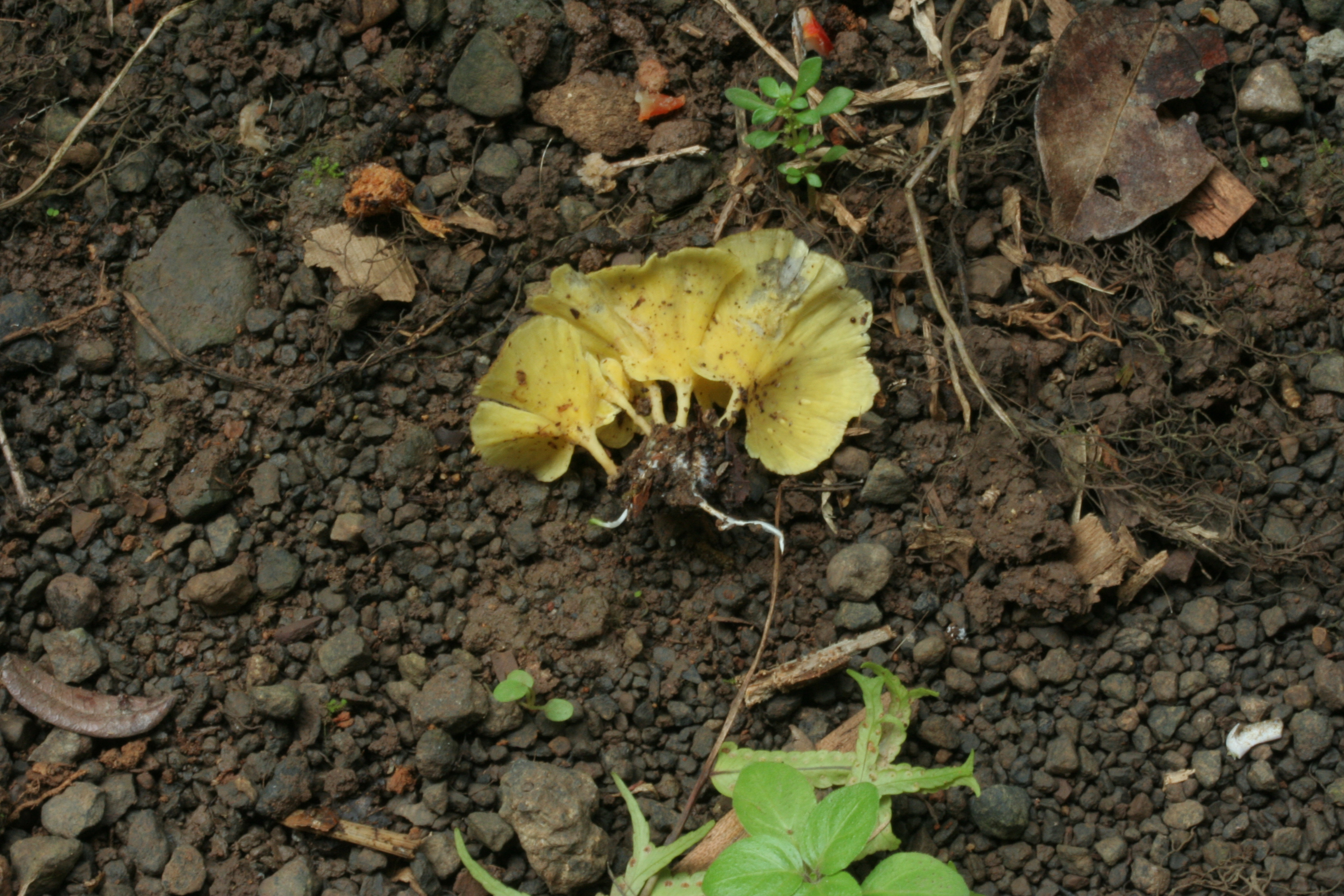
- Cotylidia aurantiaca

Scientific classification
- Domain: Eukaryota
- Kingdom: Fungi
- Division: Basidiomycota
- Class: Agaricomycetes
- Order: Agaricales
- Family: Hygrophoraceae
- Genus: Cotylidia; P.Karst (1881)

Type species
- Cotylidia undulata (Fr.) P.Karst. (1881)

Synonyms
- Craterella Pers. (1794); Bresadolina Brinkmann (1909)

= Cotylidia =

Genus of fungi

Cotylidia is a fungal genus characterized by small to moderately sized, white to palely yet brightly colored, stalked, fan-shaped to funnel-shaped fruit bodies with a smooth to wrinkled hymenium, tissues composed of monomitic hyphae, basidia producing smooth, nonamyloid spores, the absence of clamp connections, and bearing projecting cylindrical, thin-walled, hymenial cystidia. The genus is classified in the Hymenochaetales, however the type species, C. undulata has not yet been sequenced. Phylogenetically-related agaricoid fungi to the two species of Cotylidia thus far sequenced are in the genera Rickenella, Contumyces, Gyroflexus, Loreleia, Cantharellopsis and Blasiphalia, and Muscinupta and the clavarioid genus, Alloclavaria.

The ecological status of Cotylidia remains unresolved. They fruit on soil or plant debris, sometimes on burn sites or among bryophytes. The culture characteristics are unknown.

== Etymology ==
The generic name is derived from Greek and means "small cup" in reference to the fluted glass shape.

== Species ==
As of January 2022, Species Fungorum accepts 12 species of Cotylidia.

- Cotylidia aurantiaca (Pat.) A.L.Welden (1958)
- Cotylidia carpatica (Pilát) Huijsman (1954)
- Cotylidia decolorans (Berk. & M.A.Curtis) A.L.Welden (1958)
- Cotylidia diaphana (Cooke) Lentz (1955)
- Cotylidia guttulata L.Rémy (1965)
- Cotylidia harmandii (Lloyd) D.A.Reid (1965)
- Cotylidia komabensis (Henn.) D.A.Reid (1965)
- Cotylidia marsicana Lonati (2000)
- Cotylidia muscigena L.Rémy (1965)
- Cotylidia pannosa (Sowerby) D.A.Reid (1965)
- Cotylidia pusiola (Berk. & M.A.Curtis) A.L.Welden (2010)
- Cotylidia undulata (Fr.) P.Karst. (1881)
