= Lawrynomyces =

Lawrynomyces capitatus

Scientific classification
- Kingdom: Fungi
- Division: Basidiomycota
- Class: Agaricomycetes
- Order: Hymenochaetales
- Family: incertae sedis
- Genus: Lawrynomyces Karasiński
- Species: L. capitatus

Binomial name
- Lawrynomyces capitatus (J. Erikss. & Å. Strid) Karasiński

Synonyms
- Hyphoderma capitatum J. Erikss. & Å. Strid

Genus of fungi

Lawrynomyces is a genus of fungi in the Rickenella-clade of the order Hymenochaetales, containing the single species Lawrynomyces capitatus.
