= Atheloderma =

Scientific classification
- Kingdom: Fungi
- Division: Basidiomycota
- Class: Agaricomycetes
- Order: Hymenochaetales
- Family: Rickenellaceae
- Genus: Atheloderma; Parmasto, 1968

Genus of fungi

Atheloderma is a genus of fungi belonging to the family Rickenellaceae.

Species:

- Atheloderma mirabile Parmasto, 1968
- Atheloderma orientale Parmasto, 1968
