= Fibricium =

Scientific classification
- Domain: Eukaryota
- Kingdom: Fungi
- Division: Basidiomycota
- Class: Agaricomycetes
- Order: Hymenochaetales
- Family: Repetobasidiaceae
- Genus: Fibricium; J.Erikss.

Genus of fungi

Fibricium is a genus of fungi belonging to the family Repetobasidiaceae.

The genus has cosmopolitan distribution.

Species:

- Fibricium coriaceum Hjortstam & Ryvarden
- Fibricium gloeocystidiatum Rajchenb.
- Fibricium lapponicum J.Erikss.
- Fibricium rude (P.Karst.) Jülich
- Fibricium subcarneum Y.Hayashi
- Fibricium subceraceum (Hallenb.) Bernicchia
- Fibricium subodoratum (P.Karst. ex Bourdot & Galzin) Spirin
