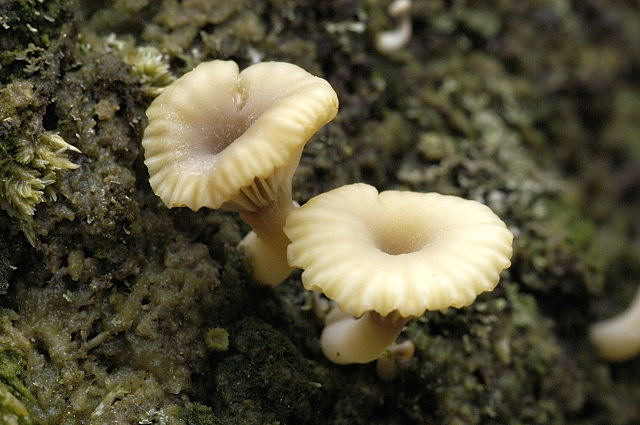

Scientific classification
- Kingdom: Fungi
- Division: Basidiomycota
- Class: Agaricomycetes
- Order: Agaricales
- Family: Hygrophoraceae
- Genus: Lichenomphalia
- Species: L. umbellifera

Binomial name
- Lichenomphalia umbellifera (L.) Redhead, Lutzoni, Moncalvo & Vilgalys (2002)

Synonyms
- List: Agaricus umbelliferus L. (1753); Byssus botryoides L. (1753); Lichen botryoides (L.) Neck. (1771); Tremella botryoides (L.) Schreb. (1771); Lepra botryoides (L.) F.H.Wigg. (1780); Agaricus epiphyllus Bull. (1792); Agaricus ericetorum Pers. (1796); Merulius umbelliferus (L.) With. (1796); Phytoconis botryoides (L.) Bory (1797); Lepraria botryoides (L.) Ach. (1798); Palmella botryoides (L.) Lyngb. (1819); Micromphale ericetorum (Pers.) Gray (1821); Merulius turfosus Pers. (1825); Agaricus androsaceus Pers. (1828); Botrydina vulgaris Bréb. (1839); Omphalia umbellifera (L.) P.Kumm. (1871); Clitocybe ericetorum (Pers.) Fr. (1872); Omphalina umbellifera (L.) Quél. (1886); Omphalia umbellifera var. nivea Rea (1922); Omphalia umbellifera f. albida J.E.Lange (1930); Omphalia umbellifera f. bispora F.H.Møller (1945); Omphalia ericetorum (Pers.) S.Lundell (1949); Omphalina ericetorum (Pers.) M.Lange (1955); Clitocybe umbellifera (L.) H.E.Bigelow (1959); Gerronema ericetorum (Pers.) Singer (1973); Botrydina botryoides (L.) Redhead & Kuyper (1987); Phytoconis ericetorum (Pers.) Redhead & Kuyper (1988); Gerronema ericetorum f. bisporum (F.H. Møller) Bon (1997); Lichenomphalia umbellifera f. bispora (F.H.Møller) P.-A.Moreau & Courtec. (2008); Lichenomphalia ericetorum (Pers.) Voitk, Thorn & I. Saar

= Lichenomphalia umbellifera =

Species of fungus

Lichenomphalia umbellifera, also known as the lichen agaric or the green-pea mushroom lichen, is a species of basidiolichen in the family Hygrophoraceae. It forms a symbiotic relationship with unicellular algae in the genus Coccomyxa.

== Taxonomy ==
The species was first described by Carl Linnaeus in 1753 as Agaricus umbelliferus. It was transferred to Lichenomphalia in 2002.

L. umbellifera has a wide geographic range and displays a considerable amount of phenotypic plasticity, but phylogenetic research has confirmed that these populations represent a single species. Two related taxa have been described in the genus Lichenomphalia, but are yet unnamed.

== Description ==
The mushroom is white to yellowish-tan and hygrophanous, and occurs throughout most of the year on damp soil and rotting wood. Its cap grows up to 3 cm wide. Its stalk is 1–3 cm tall and 1–3 mm wide. The spores are white or yellowish, producing a white spore print.

It is regarded as nonpoisonous but its small size incites little culinary interest.

=== Similar species ===
L. grisella is uncommon and has a brown cap.

Other similar species include Chromosera cyanophylla, Chrysomphalina aurantiaca, Chrysomphalina chrysophylla, Contumyces rosellus, and Rickenella fibula.

== Distribution and habitat ==
It can be found in the Northern Hemisphere, particularly in the region of the Arctic. In the North American Pacific Northwest, it is common and can be found northward from Santa Cruz.

== See also ==
- List of lichens named by Carl Linnaeus
