= Repetobasidium =

Scientific classification
- Domain: Eukaryota
- Kingdom: Fungi
- Division: Basidiomycota
- Class: Agaricomycetes
- Order: Hymenochaetales
- Family: Repetobasidiaceae
- Genus: Repetobasidium; J.Erikss. (1958)

Type species
- Repetobasidium vile (Bourdot & Galzin) J.Erikss. (1958)

Genus of fungi

Repetobasidium is a genus of fungi in the Hymenochaetales. It was circumscribed by Swedish mycologist John Eriksson in 1958.

== Species ==
- Repetobasidium americanum
- Repetobasidium canadense
- Repetobasidium conicum
- Repetobasidium erikssonii
- Repetobasidium glaucocanum
- Repetobasidium hastatum
- Repetobasidium intermedium
- Repetobasidium macrosporum
- Repetobasidium mirificum
- Repetobasidium vestitum
- Repetobasidium vile
