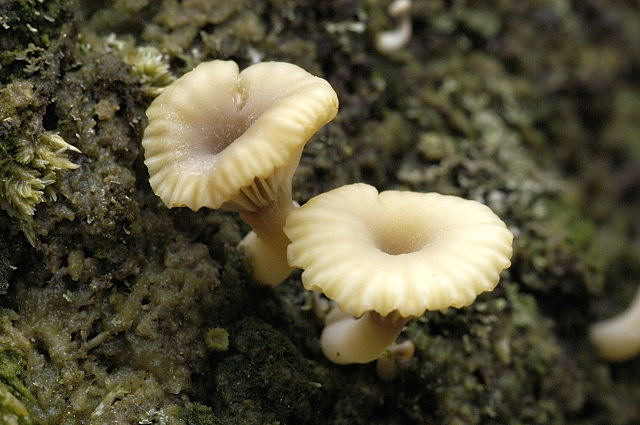
- Lichenomphalia umbellifera

Scientific classification
- Kingdom: Fungi
- Division: Basidiomycota
- Class: Agaricomycetes
- Order: Agaricales
- Family: Hygrophoraceae
- Genus: Lichenomphalia; Redhead, Lutzoni, Moncalvo & Vilgalys (2002)

Type species
- Lichenomphalia hudsoniana (H.S.Jenn.) Redhead, Lutzoni, Moncalvo & Vilgalys (2002)

Synonyms
- Phytoconis Bory (1797); Botrydina Bréb. (1839); Coriscium Vain. (1890)

= Lichenomphalia =

Genus of fungi

Lichenomphalia is both a basidiolichen and an agaric genus. Most of the species have inconspicuous lichenized thalli that consist of scattered, small, loose, nearly microscopic green balls or foliose small flakes containing single-celled green algae in the genus Coccomyxa, all interconnected by a loose network of hyphae. The agaric fruit bodies themselves are nonlichenized and resemble other types of omphalinoid mushrooms. These agarics lack clamp connections and do not form hymenial cystidia. The basidiospores are hyaline, smooth, thin-walled, and nonamyloid. Most of the species were originally classified in the genera Omphalina or Gerronema. Historically the species were classified with those other genera in the family, the Tricholomataceae together with the nonlichenized species. Lichenomphalia species can be grouped into brightly colored taxa, with vivid yellow and orange colors, versus the grey brown group, depending upon the microscopic pigmentation deposits. Molecular research comparing DNA sequences now place Lichenomphalia close to the redefined genus Arrhenia, which together with several other genera not traditionally considered to be related, fall within the newly redefined Hygrophoraceae.

== Etymology ==
Lichenomphalia is derived from the word lichen combined with the old, shorter, generic name Omphalia from whence the more familiar, longer, diminutive generic name Omphalina was derived. Basically it means the lichen omphalias.

== Thallus names and nomenclature ==
Long before the connection was made between the nonlichenized agaric fruitbodies and the lichenized thalli, botanists and lichenologists named the asexual lichen thalli of Lichenomphalia species several times in a number of genera. Linnaeus in 1753 described the lichen thallus of L. umbellifera as an 'alga' named Byssus botryoides while simultaneously including the fruitbodies of L. umbellifera within his concept of Agaricus umbelliferus, the basionym for the name L. umbellifera. Byssus botryoides is the type species of the now officially rejected generic names Phytoconis and Botrydina. Acharius in 1810 described the thalli of L. hudsoniana as a lichen, Endocarpon viride, which is the type of another officially rejected name, Coriscium. The names 'Botrydina' and 'Coriscium' are often used to describe the thalli of different Lichenomphalia even though they are rejected names listed in the International Code of Botanical Nomenclature (Appendix V). Prior to officially rejecting these names, the names Botrydina and Phytoconis were both applied to describe Lichenomphalia species. Hence literature on these lichenized agarics appears under a myriad of names, such as Omphalina, Gerronema, Phytoconis, Botrydina and Coriscium.

== Photobionts ==
Species in Lichenomphalia form symbiotic relationships with green algae of the genus Coccomyxa. Studies have shown that at least five Lichenomphalia species (L. grisella, L. hudsoniana, L. luteovitellina, L. velutina, and L. umbellifera) share a single phylogenetic species, Coccomyxa subellipsoidea, as their photobiont. Research on L. meridionalis has demonstrated that it can associate with two different strains of C. subellipsoidea, with their distribution varying according to altitude – one strain predominating at lower elevations and another at higher elevations. Some Lichenomphalia specimens, particularly L. meridionalis collected at lower elevations, can also contain cyanobacteria alongside their primary green algal partner, suggesting the potential for a three-way symbiotic relationship in certain environmental conditions.

== Species ==
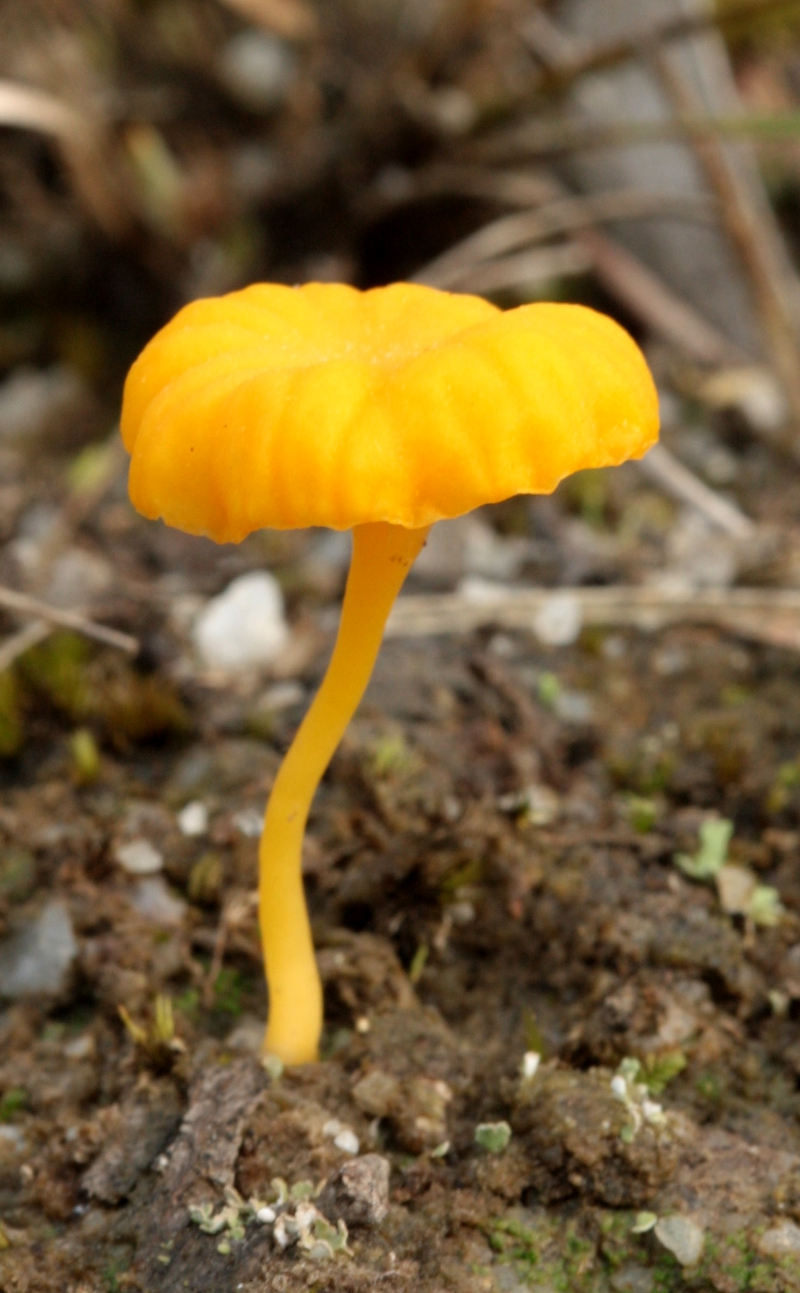
Lichenomphalia chromacea, Australia

As of October 2023, Species Fungorum accepts 15 species of Lichenomphalia.

- Lichenomphalia alpina (Britzelm.) Redhead, Lutzoni, Moncalvo & Vilgalys (2002)
- Lichenomphalia altoandina Sand.-Leiva & Niveiro (2017) – Chile
- Lichenomphalia aurantiaca (Redhead & Kuyper) Redhead, Lutzoni, Moncalvo & Vilgalys (2002) – Colombia
- Lichenomphalia chromacea (Cleland) Redhead, Lutzoni, Moncalvo & Vilgalys (2002) – Australia
- Lichenomphalia cinereispinula Neville & Fouchier (2009) – Europe
- Lichenomphalia hudsoniana (H.S.Jenn.) Redhead, Lutzoni, Moncalvo & Vilgalys (2002) – widespread in Northern Hemisphere
- Lichenomphalia lobata (Redhead & Kuyper) Redhead, Lutzoni, Moncalvo & Vilgalys (2002) – Colombia; Ecuador; Venezuela
- Lichenomphalia luteovitellina (Pilát & Nannf.) Redhead, Lutzoni, Moncalvo & Vilgalys (2008)
- Lichenomphalia meridionalis (Contu & La Rocca) P.-A.Moreau & Courtec. (2008)
- Lichenomphalia oreades (Singer) Voitk, Thorn & I.Saar (2017)
- Lichenomphalia pararustica (Clémençon) Elborne (2008)
- Lichenomphalia tasmanica Kantvilas (2012) – Tasmania, Australia
- Lichenomphalia umbellifera (L.) Redhead, Lutzoni, Moncalvo & Vilgalys (2002) – widespread in Northern Hemisphere
- Lichenomphalia velutina (Quél.) Redhead, Lutzoni, Moncalvo & Vilgalys (2002) – China; Europe; Greenland; North America;
- Lichenomphalia wallacei (P.D.Orton) Lüderitz (2018)

== See also ==
- List of Agaricales genera
