= Gerronema viridilucens =

Scientific classification
- Kingdom: Fungi
- Division: Basidiomycota
- Class: Agaricomycetes
- Order: Agaricales
- Family: Porotheleaceae
- Genus: Gerronema
- Species: G. viridilucens

Binomial name
- Gerronema viridilucens Desjardin, Capelari & Stevani (2005)

Species of fungus

Gerronema viridilucens is a species of agaric fungus in the family Porotheleaceae. Found in South America, the mycelium and fruit bodies of the fungus are bioluminescent.

== See also ==
- List of bioluminescent fungi
