= Cyanotrama =

Scientific classification
- Kingdom: Fungi
- Division: Basidiomycota
- Class: Agaricomycetes
- Order: Hymenochaetales
- Genus: Cyanotrama; Ghobad-Nejhad & Y.C.Dai (2010)

Type species
- Cyanotrama rimosa (Murrill) Ghobad-Nejhad (2010)

Synonyms
- Poria rimosa Murrill (1920); Diplomitoporus rimosus (Murrill) Gilb. & Ryvarden (1985)

Genus of fungi

Cyanotrama is a fungal genus in the Hymenochaetales order. The genus is monotypic, containing the single species Cyanotrama rimosa, widely distributed in western North America. It has also been collected in single occasions in Ethiopia and Iran. The fungus causes a white rot in conifers, especially junipers. C. rimosa was originally named Poria rimos in 1920 by William Alphonso Murrill, and later known as Diplomitoporus rimosus. Molecular work revealed that the species was aligned not with the polyporoid fungi as previously assumed, but rather with the hymenochaetoid fungi, and Cyanotrama was created to contain it. The genus name refers to the strong cyanophilic reaction (stainable with blue dyes) of the skeletal hyphae, particularly noticeable in the trama.
