= Lichenomphalia cinereispinula =

Scientific classification
- Domain: Eukaryota
- Kingdom: Fungi
- Division: Basidiomycota
- Class: Agaricomycetes
- Order: Agaricales
- Family: Hygrophoraceae
- Genus: Lichenomphalia
- Species: L. cinereispinula

Binomial name
- Lichenomphalia cinereispinula Neville & Fouchier (2009)

Species of lichen

Lichenomphalia cinereispinula is a little-known species of basidiolichen in the family Hygrophoraceae. It is known only from a few documented records in the south of France.

== Taxonomy ==
The lichen was described as a new species in 2009 by Pierre Neville and Francis Fouchier. The species name derives from Latin cinereus ('ash-grey') and spinula ('small spine' or 'pin'), referring to its slender grey appearance resembling a pin. The type specimen was collected at a place called "La Rivière", in the commune of Collobrières; here it was found growing on the ground at an elevation of 135 m (443 ft).

== Description ==
The lichen makes a slender mushroom-like fruiting body with a stipe length about three to five times the diameter of the cap. The convex to sub-hemispherical gray cap measures 0.2–0.6 cm (0.08–0.24 in) and has slight radial "ribs". There are 10 gills and 7 short gills (lamellulae) on the cap underside that are distantly spaced and dull whitish in colour. The thin cylindrical stipe is pruinose with a somewhat bulbous base. There are greenish glomerules at the stipe base, indicating a lichen thallus of the Botrydina type.

Microscopically, the species has claviform (club-shaped) basidia that are predominantly tetrasporic (bearing four spores), measuring 22–32 by 5–6.8 μm. The pileus covering (pileipellis) is arranged as a cutis with distinctly encrusted hyphae, while the caulopellis features often-septate hairs up to 45 by 3–4 μm long. The species lacks cystidia and clamp connections. Basidiospores are smooth, inamyloid, hyaline, and ellipsoid in shape, and have dimensions of 5.3–7.7 by 3.0–4.4 μm.

Lichenomphalia cinereispinula is distinguished from the similar L. pararustica by its more slender stature, with a stipe length 3–5 times the cap diameter (versus 1-2 times in L. pararustica), its persistently subhemispherical cap (versus becoming funnel-shaped in L. pararustica), and its smaller spores.

== Habitat and distribution ==
Lichenomphalia cinereispinula fruits in autumn on soil in Mediterranean climate regions, known only from the south of France (Var department). It forms a lichenized association with a green alga that produces greenish globular structures (30–50 μm in diameter) at the base of the stipe. The species appears to be rare, documented from only two collections in a limited region of southern France; its conservation status has not been formally assessed.
