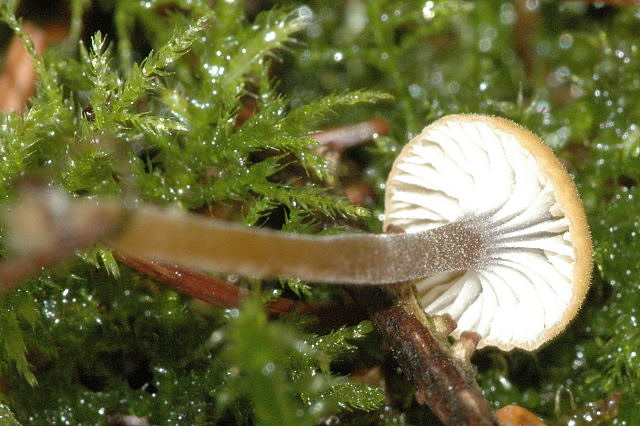
- Rickenella swartzii

Scientific classification
- Kingdom: Fungi
- Division: Basidiomycota
- Class: Agaricomycetes
- Order: Hymenochaetales
- Family: Repetobasidiaceae
- Genus: Rickenella; Raithelh. (1973)

Type species
- Rickenella fibula (Bull.) Raithelh. (1973)

Species
- R. alexandri R. aulacomniophila R. demissella R. fibula R. mellea R. minuta R. piquiniana R. straminea R. swartzii

= Rickenella =

Genus of fungi

Rickenella is a genus of brightly colored bryophilous (moss inhabiting) agarics in the family Repetobasidiaceae (order Hymenochaetales) that have an omphalinoid morphology. They inhabit patches of moss that grow on soil, tree trunks and logs in temperate regions of the planet. Phylogenetically related agarics are in the genera Contumyces, Gyroflexus, Loreleia, Cantharellopsis and Blasiphalia, as well as the stipitate-stereoid genera Muscinupta and Cotylidia and the clavarioid genus, Alloclavaria.

Rickenella is most similar to Contumyces and Blasiphalia, from the former differing by having its cystidia on the cap, stipe, and hymenium solitary and scattered. The hair-like cystidia on the cap and stipe give the small mushrooms a fuzzy appearance when viewed through a magnifying glass or hand lens. This helps to distinguish the genus from genera like Loreleia, which can be orange colored and inhabits similar sites, as well as other brightly pigmented omphalinoid genera. Rickenella does not produce massive clasping, hand-like appressoria on the rhizoids of its host, as does Blasiphalia. Instead, Rickenella produces a small appressorium or no appressoria and penetrates the rhizoids of its moss hosts, growing within the cells.

The monotypic genus Blasiphalia is a recent molecular segregate of Rickenella.

== Etymology ==
Rickenella was named after the German mycologist Adalbert Ricken, the author of "Die Blätterpilze (Agaricaceae) (1915) Deutschlands und der angrenzenden Länder, besonders Oesterreichs und der Schweiz".
