= Gerronema stevensonii =

Scientific classification
- Domain: Eukaryota
- Kingdom: Fungi
- Division: Basidiomycota
- Class: Agaricomycetes
- Order: Agaricales
- Family: Porotheleaceae
- Genus: Gerronema
- Species: G. stevensonii

Binomial name
- Gerronema stevensonii (Berk. & Broome) Watling (1998)

Synonyms
- Cantharellus stevensonii Berk. & Broome (1875); Merulius stevensonii (Berk. & Broome) Kuntze (1891); Hygrophoropsis stevensonii (Berk. & Broome) Corner (1966)

Species of mushroom-forming fungus

Gerronema stevensonii is a rare species of agaric fungus in the family Porotheleaceae. First discovered in Scotland in 1874, it produces tiny pale fruit bodies with caps measuring only 3–5 mm across. The fungus is known primarily from its original collection near Glamis, Scotland, where it was found growing on very decayed wood among moss. Despite limited subsequent sightings, it remains one of Britain's rarest mushrooms.

== Taxonomy ==
It was first described by Miles Joseph Berkeley and Christopher Edmund Broome in 1875, calling it Cantharellus stevensonii. The fungus was named after the Reverend John Stevenson, who in 1874 made the type collection in Glamis, Scotland. Roy Watling transferred the species to the genus Gerronema in 1998. It is known only from its type locality in Scotland and a handful of later, unverified collections, and remains extremely rare in Britain.

== Description ==
Gerronema stevensonii produces minute, pale fruit bodies. The cap (pileus) is typically 3–5 mm across—originally recorded as "2 lines" (c. 4 mm) in diameter—disc‑shaped with a shallow central depression (umbilicate), smooth and uniformly pale. Young specimens have an inflexed margin. Gills are decurrent, closely spaced, and initially pale before turning faintly brownish with age. The slender stipe measures up to 6 mm tall and 1–2 mm thick; it is cylindrical, finely pruinose when fresh, and darkens slightly with age, arising from a small patch of white mycelium at the base.

A small number of spores measured from the type material were 6–7 by 3–3.5 μm, and hyphae examined in the type showed clamp connections—characters that distinguish it from superficially similar, unclamped species in other genera.

== Distribution and habitat ==
The only confirmed locality for G. stevensonii is near Glamis in Angus, Scotland, where Rev. John Stevenson gathered it in March and April 1874 on very rotten wood among moss. Original specimens and three further packets of the type material are housed at the Royal Botanic Gardens, Kew.

Later reports are few and require verification: E. J. H. Corner recorded similar material in the Breckland region of East Anglia (his East Anglian collections are held at Cambridge but need re‑examination), and a single Scottish collection on Sphagnum from Loch Duartmore, Sutherland (6 May 1990), is preserved at Kew but its identity remains uncertain. Several other records under related names in national databases appear to be misidentifications. Taken together, these data suggest that if it still occurs, G. stevensonii is extraordinarily rare in Britain.
