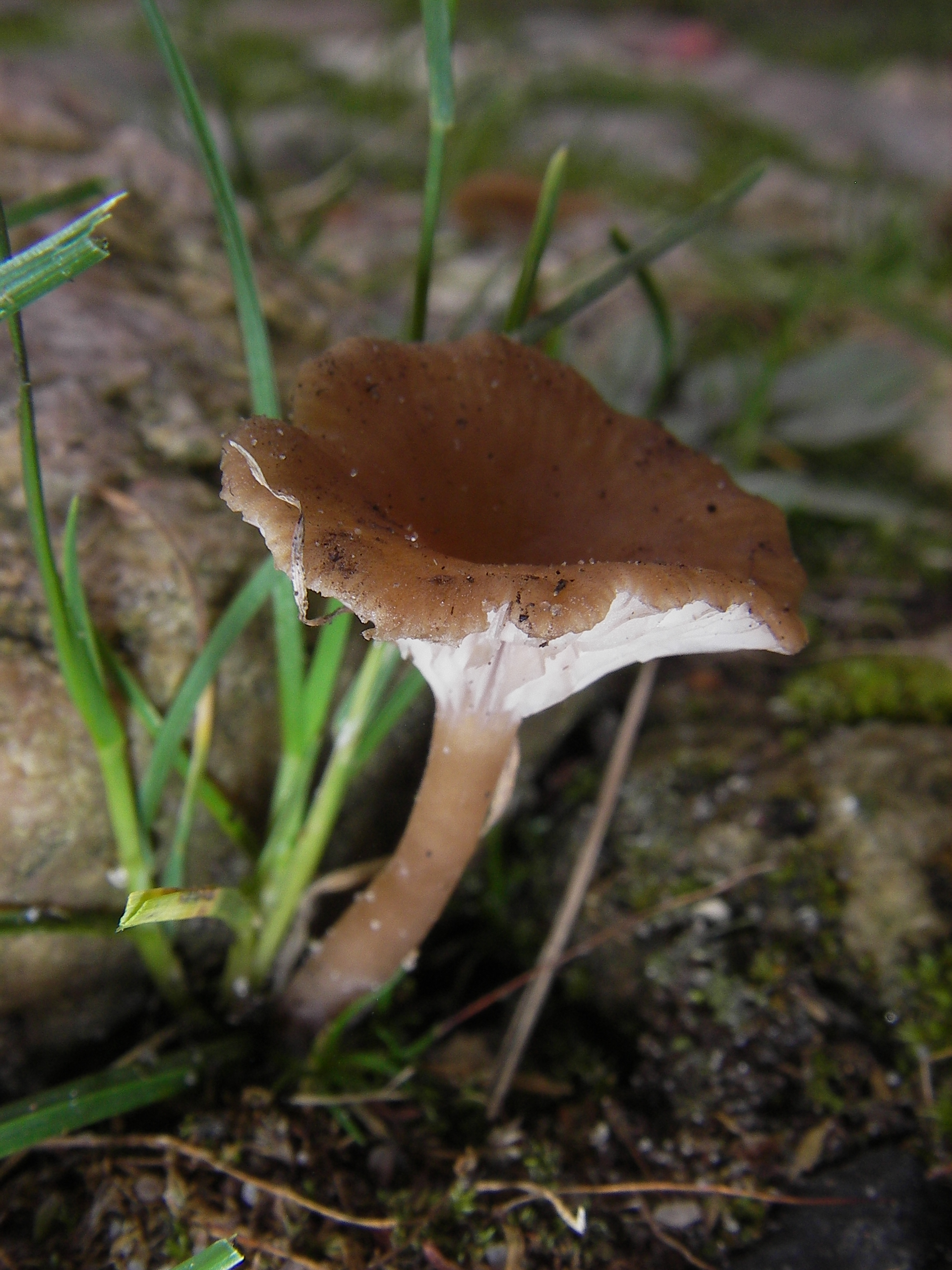
- Omphalina pyxidata

Scientific classification
- Domain: Eukaryota
- Kingdom: Fungi
- Division: Basidiomycota
- Class: Agaricomycetes
- Order: Agaricales
- Family: Tricholomataceae
- Genus: Omphalina
- Species: O. pyxidata

Binomial name
- Omphalina pyxidata (Bull.) Quél.

Synonyms
- 1789 Agaricus subhepaticus Batsch; 1792 Agaricus visceralis J.F. Gmel.; 1801 Agaricus montanus var. subhepaticus (Batsch) Pers.; 1809 Agaricus pyxidatus Bull.; 1815 Agaricus hepaticus Fr.; 1838 Agaricus pyxidatus * hepaticus Fr.; 1871 Omphalia pyxidata (Bull.) P. Kumm.; 1876 Omphalia hepatica (Fr.) Gillet; 1943 Clitocybe pyxidata (Bull.) Singer; 1960 Omphalina hepatica (Fr.) P.D. Orton; 1974 Clitocybe hepatica (Bull.) H.E. Bigelow; 1980 Gerronema pyxidatum (Bull.) Raithelh.; 1916 Omphalina subhepatica (Batsch) Murrill

= Omphalina pyxidata =

Species of fungus

Omphalina pyxidata is a species of fungus in the family Tricholomataceae, and the type species of the genus Omphalina. It is found in North America and Europe.
