= Lichenomphalia altoandina =

Conservation status
- Vulnerable (IUCN 3.1)

Scientific classification
- Domain: Eukaryota
- Kingdom: Fungi
- Division: Basidiomycota
- Class: Agaricomycetes
- Order: Agaricales
- Family: Hygrophoraceae
- Genus: Lichenomphalia
- Species: L. altoandina

Binomial name
- Lichenomphalia altoandina Sand.-Leiva & Niveiro (2017)

Species of lichen

Lichenomphalia altoandina is a species of basidiolichen in the family Hygrophoraceae. Found in Chile, it was described as a new species in 2017 by Pablo Sandoval-Leiva and Nicolas Niveiro.

== Taxonomy ==
The type specimen was collected close to Colpitas (General Lagos, Arica y Parinacota Region) at a height above mean sea level of 4,154 m (13,629 ft). Here the lichen was found in a saline wetland amongst cushions of dead plants Zameioscirpus atacamensis and Oxychloë andina, as well as Carex and Deyeuxia curvula. The specific epithet altoandina combines alto- ("high") with andina ("Andes"), alluding to the habitat of the lichens.

== Description ==
The lichen Lichenomphalia altoandina has an inconspicuous thallus. It makes clusters of orange fruitbodies with caps up to 32 mm (1.3 in) in diameter on top of a stipe that is 7–20 mm (0.3–0.8 in) long by 2–5 mm (0.08–0.20 in) broad. The gills on the cap underside are decurrent, distantly spaced, and interspersed with lamellulae (small gills) of different lengths. The basidia, which are attached to one to four spores, typically measure 33–68 by 6–9.5 μm. Basidiospores are smooth and thin-walled, hyaline, roughly spherical to ellipsoid in shape, and usually measure 8–10.5 by 5–7 μm.

== Habitat and distribution ==
Although it is only known from the type locality, the authors speculate that it is more widely distributed throughout northern Chile in high-elevation Andean Mountain wetlands. The habitat of the lichen is typical of the puna grassland ecoregion in altiplano found in Bolivia, Chile, Argentina, and Peru.

== Conservation ==
In 2020, Lichenomphalia altoandina was assessed as a vulnerable species for the global IUCN Red List. Its relatively small population—estimated to be about 600 individuals distributed in smaller subpopulations in up to 50 sites with suitable habitat—is subject to the impacts of mining, quarrying and other human activities.
