= Lichenomphalia tasmanica =

Scientific classification
- Domain: Eukaryota
- Kingdom: Fungi
- Division: Basidiomycota
- Class: Agaricomycetes
- Order: Agaricales
- Family: Hygrophoraceae
- Genus: Lichenomphalia
- Species: L. tasmanica

Binomial name
- Lichenomphalia tasmanica Kantvilas (2012)

Species of lichen

Lichenomphalia tasmanica is a species of basidiolichen in the family Hygrophoraceae. It is found in Tasmania, Australia. It has a bright scaley thallus that grows like a green crust on rich soil between rocks. Occasionally. the lichen produces small, bright yellow-orange mushroom-like fruiting bodies.

== Taxonomy ==
The lichen was formally described as a new species in 2012 by Gintaras Kantvilas. The type specimen was collected on the track to Nevada Peak at an altitude of 1,150 m (3,770 ft), where it was found growing on the ground between boulders in heathland. The specific epithet refers to the type locality. The authors explained that they had seen the unidentifiable sterile crust form of the lichen for many years before observing its fruiting stage, noting "it was very exciting when the species was finally encountered fertile, producing not ascomata as expected but attractive, yellow-orange, mushroom-like basidiocarps".

== Description ==
The lichen has a bright green squamulose thallus comprising convex squamules (scales) that measure 0.5–2 mm wide and 0.5–1 mm thick. Its fruiting body is a bright yellow-orange mushroom with a cap 3–11 mm wide, and distantly-spaced, decurrent gills on the underside of the cap, more or less the same colour (or lighter) as the cap surface. The stipe is 0.5–10 mm tall with a minute tomentum (i.e. fine, soft "hairs"); its colour is initially white in fresh specimens, but drys to a pale orange-pink. The basidia are four-spored. Basidiospores are translucent with thin walls, typically measuring 7.5–8.5–10 by 5–5.7–6.5 μm.

== Habitat ==
The thallus squamules of Lichenomphalia tasmanica usually grow on moist soil that is enriched with organic matter, such as is typical of the gaps between stones in heathland at the type locality. Associated lichens include Cladonia species, Parasiphula fragilis, and Siphula decumbens. The authors are not sure of the fruiting season of Lichenomphalia tasmanica, but suspect that it does not fruit annually.
