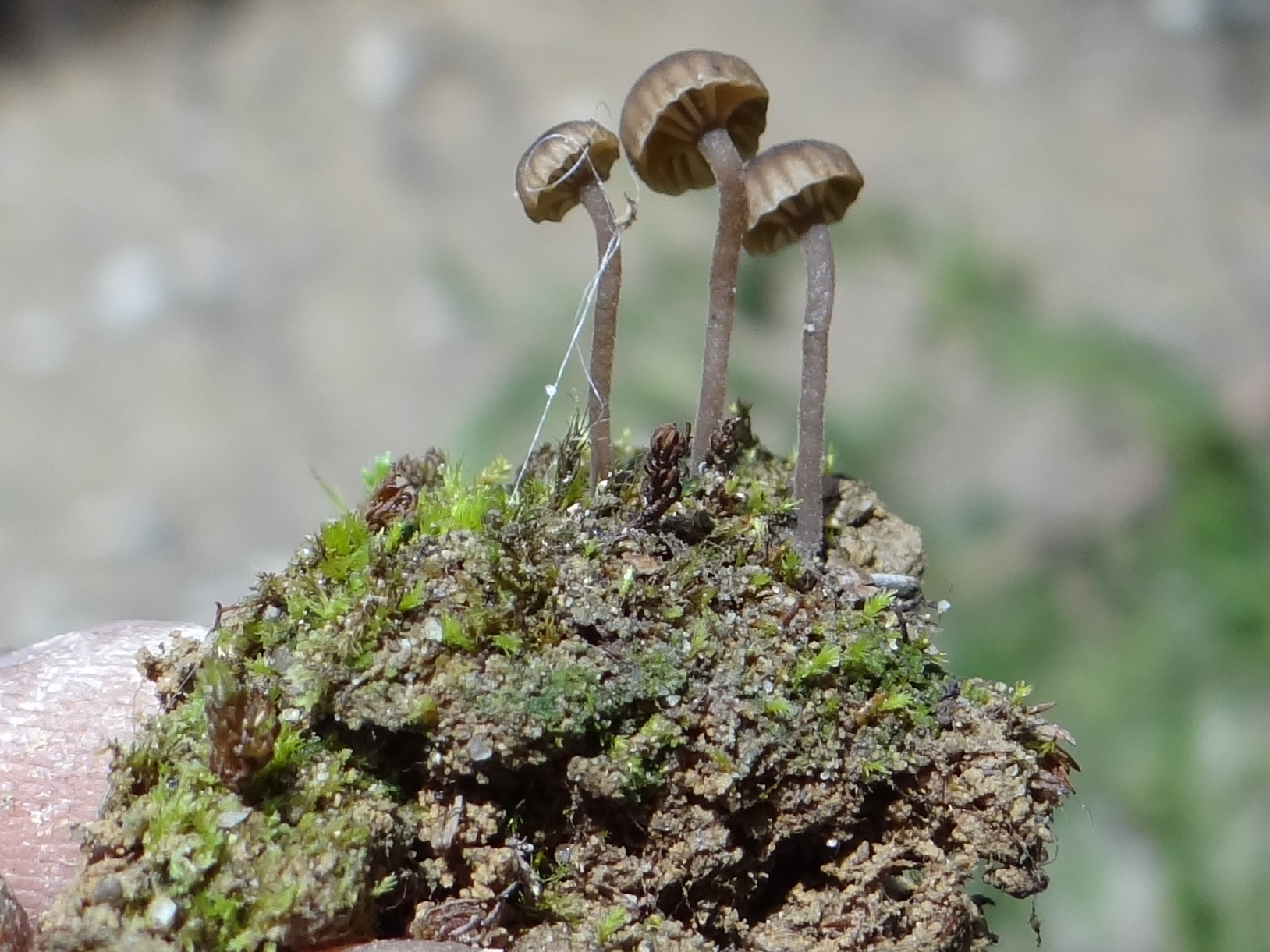

Scientific classification
- Domain: Eukaryota
- Kingdom: Fungi
- Division: Basidiomycota
- Class: Agaricomycetes
- Order: Agaricales
- Family: Hygrophoraceae
- Genus: Lichenomphalia
- Species: L. velutina

Binomial name
- Lichenomphalia velutina (Quél.) Redhead, Lutzoni, Moncalvo & Vilgalys (2002)

Synonyms
- Omphalia velutina Quél. (1886); Omphalina velutina (Quél.) Quél. (1886); Botrydina velutina (Quél.) Redhead & Kuyper (1987); Phytoconis velutina (Quél.) Redhead & Kuyper (1988); Omphalia grisella P.Karst. (1890); Omphalina grisella (P.Karst.) M.M.Moser (1953); Lichenomphalia grisella (P.Karst.) Redhead, Lutzoni, Moncalvo & Vilgalys (2002)

= Lichenomphalia velutina =

Species of basidiolichen

Lichenomphalia velutina is a species of basidiolichen in the family Hygrophoraceae. It was first formally described in 1886 by the French mycologist Lucien Quélet, who classified it in the genus Omphalia. It was transferred to its current genus, Lichenomphalia, in 2002. Known primarily as having a European and North American distribution, the fungus was recorded from China (and Asia) for the first time in 2018. Chinese collections occur at elevations greater than 3,000 m (9,800 ft), while those in Europe tend to be at elevations under 1,500 m (4,900 ft). Lichenomphalia velutina also occurs in Greenland. It grows on soil and on moss.

== Description ==
The thallus of Lichenomphalia velutina is subtle and resembles the Botrydina type; it is made up of globules that can be either dispersed or clustered, ranging in diameter from 35 to 90 μm. These globules turn translucent when wet and vary in colour from yellow-green to dark green. They are formed from clusters of single-celled green algae, known as Coccomyxa, surrounded by clear fungal threads (hyphae) which are 1–5 μm wide and do not have clamp connections.

The basidiomata (fruiting body) of this species is mushroom-like, with a cap (pileus) that is 4–12 mm in diameter, varying in colour from grey-brown to dark brown. The cap is typically convex, with a depression in the centre, and may have a slightly wavy and streaked edge. It is smooth or somewhat fibrous and contains gills (lamellae) that are spaced apart, broad, and run down the stipe (decurrent), matching the cap in colour or slightly lighter. The flesh of the cap is thick and brittle, with interwoven hyphae that have a unique 'zebroid' (zebra-like) brown pattern. The cylindrical stipe ranges from 0.5 to 1.5 cm in height, matches the cap in colour or is lighter towards the base, and has a fuzzy appearance with a white fungal patch at its base.

The reproductive structures include basidia, which are 14–25 by 4–8.5 μm in size and contain either four or occasionally two spores. The basidiospores are 6–9 by 4–6 μm, elliptical to almost round, clear, non-amyloid, and may contain oil droplets.

Chemically, Lichenomphalia velutina does not react to standard lichen spot tests, indicating the absence of certain secondary metabolites in both the thallus and the basidiomata. The species lacks cystidia and clamp connections.
