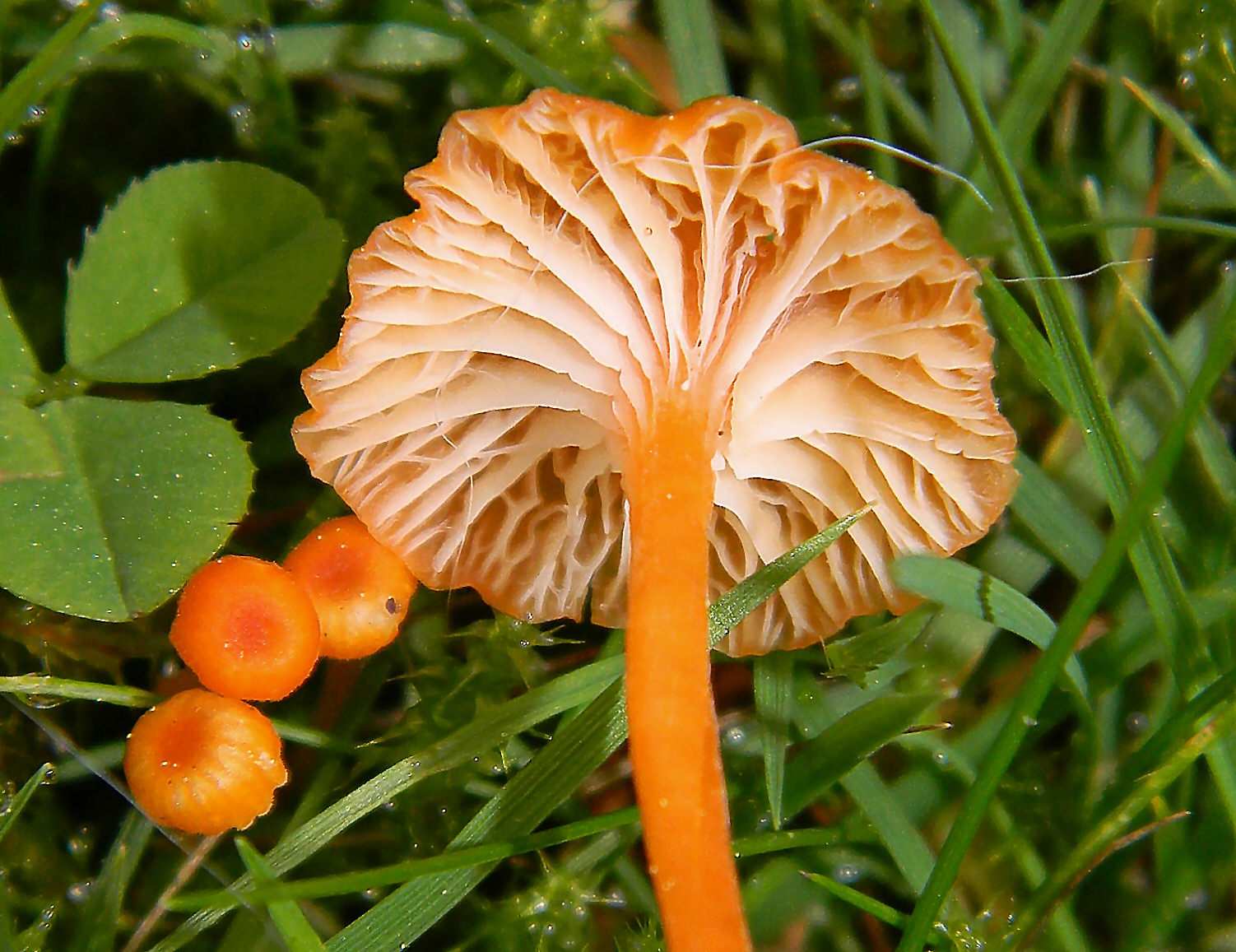

Scientific classification
- Kingdom: Fungi
- Division: Basidiomycota
- Class: Agaricomycetes
- Order: Hymenochaetales
- Family: Repetobasidiaceae
- Genus: Rickenella
- Species: R. fibula

Binomial name
- Rickenella fibula (Bull.) Raithelh. (1973)

Synonyms
- Agaricus fibula Bull. (1784); Omphalina fibula (Fr.) Quél. (1886); Gerronema fibula (Bull. ex Fr.) Sing.

= Rickenella fibula =

Species of fungus

Rickenella fibula
- Mycological characteristics
- Gills on hymenium
- Cap is depressed or infundibuliform
- Hymenium is decurrent
- Stipe is bare
- Spore print is white
- Ecology is saprotrophic
- Edibility is unknown

Rickenella fibula (synonym Omphalina fibula), commonly known as the orange moss navel is a species of fungus belonging to the family Repetobasidiaceae.

== Description ==
The fruit body is orange to yellow and occurs among moss, which is why it is sometimes called moss sentinel. The cap is quite small, with a diameter usually less than 1 centimetre (3/8 in). The stipe is relatively long, about 1.5–4.5 cm (5/8–1 3/4 in). It has little odor or taste, and is regarded as nonpoisonous. The spore print is white.

=== Similar species ===
According to molecular analysis, the species is more closely related to certain polypores and crust fungi than other gilled mushrooms. A similar species is Rickenella swartzii.

It may resemble its relative Loreleia marchantiae as well as Mycena acicula and Entoloma unicolor. The stems of Xeromphalina are darker.
