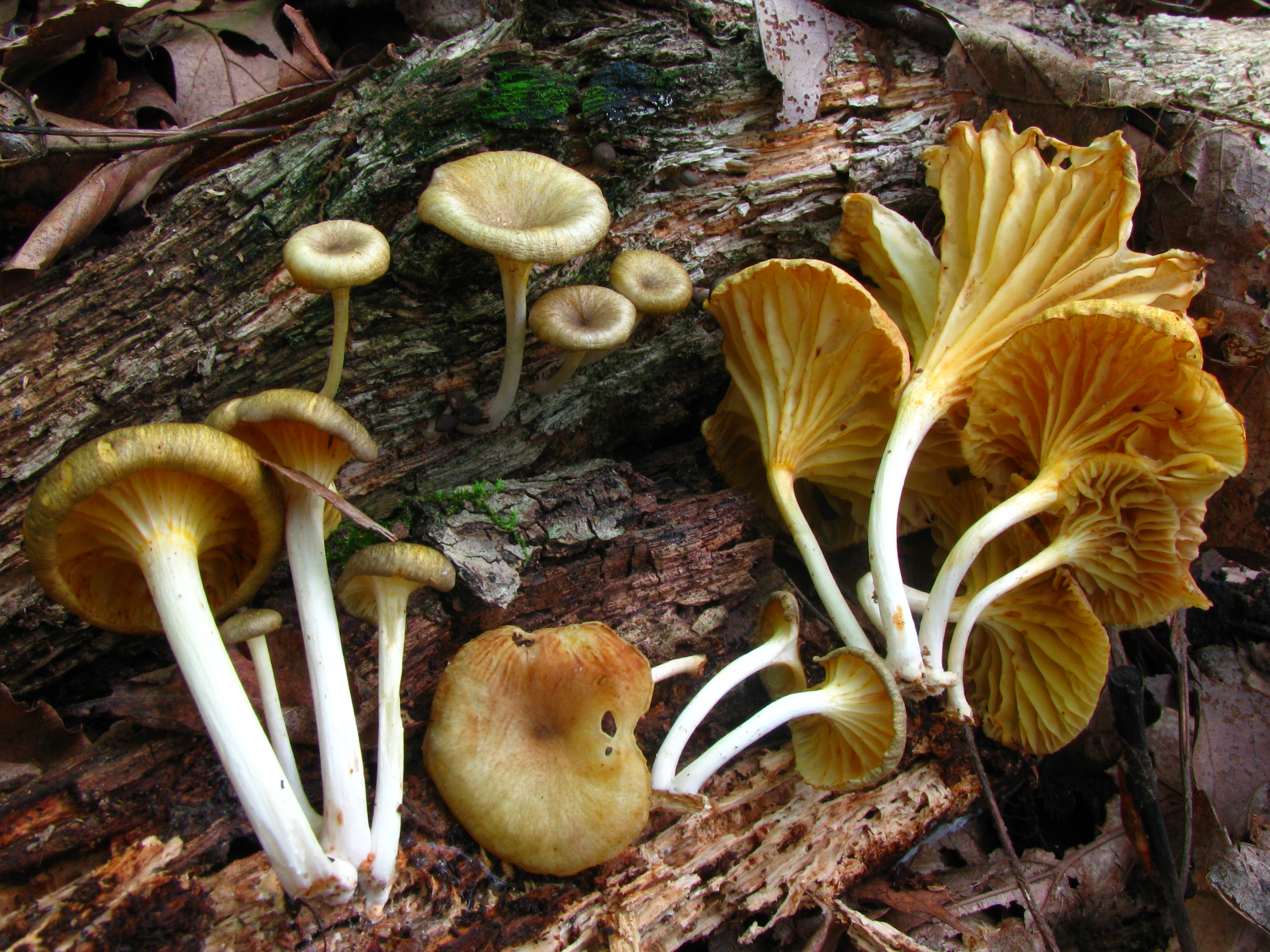
- Gerronema strombodes

Scientific classification
- Kingdom: Fungi
- Division: Basidiomycota
- Class: Agaricomycetes
- Order: Agaricales
- Family: Porotheleaceae
- Genus: Gerronema; Singer (1951)

Type species
- Gerronema melanomphax Singer (1951)

= Gerronema =

Genus of fungi

Gerronema is a genus of over 50 fungi species that form agaric fruit bodies. They are of small to medium size, with a centrally depressed cap. They are similar to Omphalina species.

A wood-decay fungus, Gerronema has a primarily tropical distribution, occurring in Europe and eastern North America.

== Taxonomy ==
The genus was circumscribed by American mycologist Rolf Singer in 1951.

=== Phylogeny ===
Gerronema belongs to the informal 'hydropoid' clade, together with Hydropus, Megacollybia and Clitocybula. In a phylogenetic study of Clitocybulas, the hydropoid clade was found to contain 8 genera.

In 2019, the hydropoid clade was moved to Porotheleaceae, removing Gerronema from Marasmiaceae. The same study also recognized Gerronema as polyphyletic on the basis of previous taxonomic studies and divided it into seven clades, designated as Gerronema 1 to Gerronema 7.

=== Species ===
As of June 2015, Index Fungorum lists 55 species in Gerronema: and a new combination was published in 2019.

- G. aconquijense
- G. albidum
- G. albogriseolum
- G. alutaceum
- G. amabile
- G. atrialba
- G. baishanzuense
- G. bethlehemicum
- G. brunneum
- G. bryogeton
- G. calongei
- G. candidum
- G. chrysocarpum
- G. chrysocraspedum
- G. cinctum
- G. citrinum
- G. collybiomorphum
- G. corticiphilum
- G. costaricense
- G. cyathiforme
- G. daamsii
- G. daguense
- G. farinolens
- G. fibula
- G. flammeum
- G. glutinipes
- G. hungo
- G. incarnatum
- G. infumatum
- G. josserandii
- G. laccarioides
- G. longipes
- G. majus
- G. mariae
- G. microcarpum
- G. melanomphax
- G. moseri
- G. nemorale
- G. nitriolens
- G. oligophyllum
- G. pantoxanthum
- G. pseudomurale
- G. reclinis
- G. sanguineum
- G. schusteri
- G. sericeum
- G. stevensonii
- G. strombodes
- G. subchrysophyllum
- G. subclavatum
- G. suboreades
- G. subsericellum
- G. sucrense
- G. tenue
- G. theophili
- G. umbilicatum
- G. virgineum
- G. viridilucens
- G. xanthophyllum
- G. zhujian

== Description ==
The species are small- to medium-sized agarics with white, nonamyloid, spores and decurrent gills.

Typically the cap of the fruit bodies have a shallow to deep central depression, giving the umbrella-like to funnel-shaped caps the appearance of a belly button, or a belly with a navel.

At least one species, G. viridilucens, is bioluminescent.

=== Similar species ===
Similarly shaped agarics are said to be omphalinoid in appearance in reference to a morphologically similar genus, Omphalina. Gerronema differ from Omphalina by the absence of incrusting or intraparietal pigments typical of Omphalina, the occasional occurrence of bright colors, such as yellow or green absent in Omphalina, by the restriction to decay of wood, and by the tough tissues composed of sarcodimitic hyphae.

== Distribution and habitat ==
The species is a wood-decay fungus with a primarily tropical distribution, but also occur in Europe and eastern North America where they fruit during hot muggy, summer weather. One of the most common species in the eastern United States is G. strombodes.

== See also ==
- List of Agaricales genera
