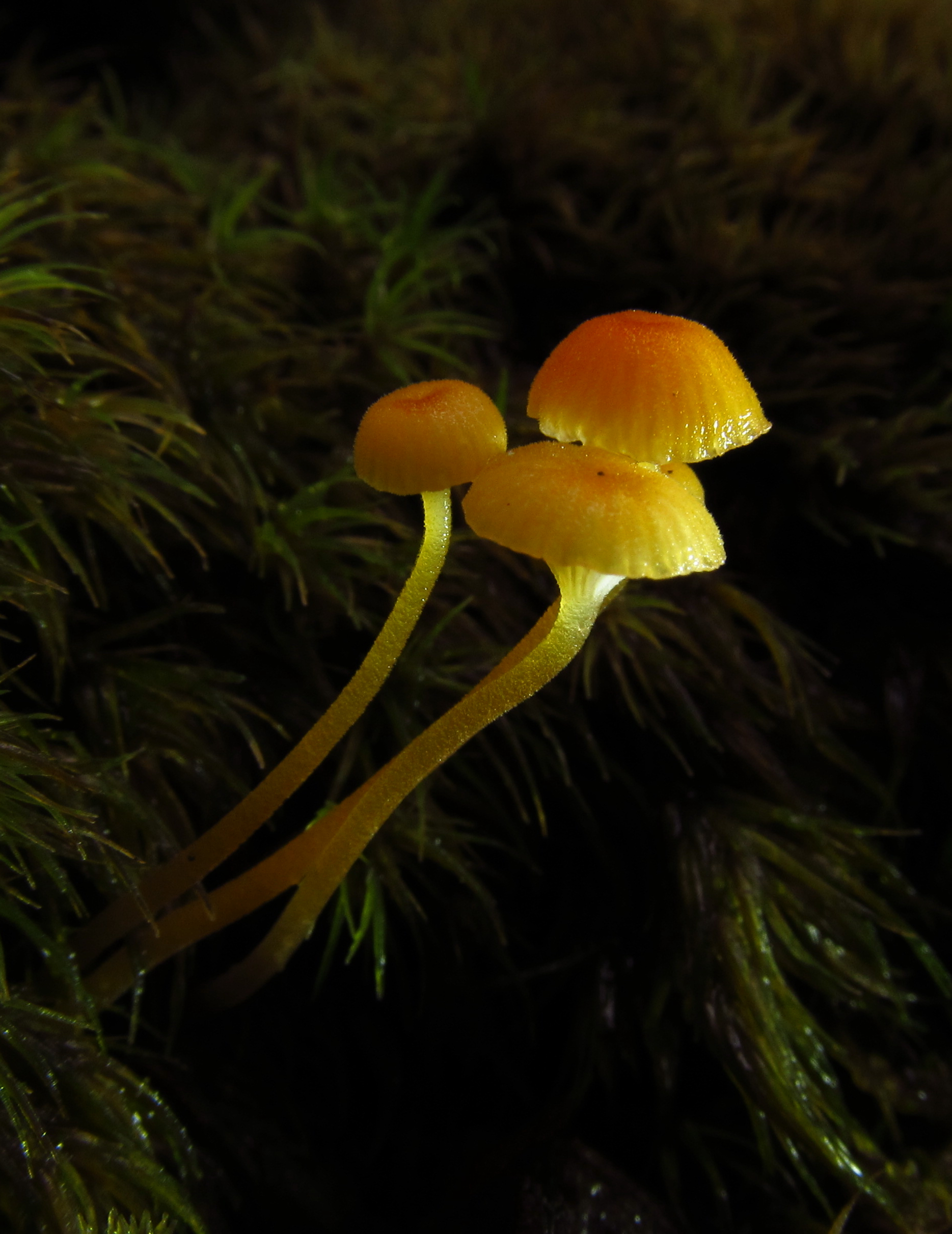
- Rickenella fibula

Scientific classification
- Kingdom: Fungi
- Division: Basidiomycota
- Class: Agaricomycetes
- Order: Hymenochaetales
- Family: Repetobasidiaceae; Jülich (1982)

Type genus
- Repetobasidium J.Erikss. (1958)

Genera
- Alloclavaria; Blasiphalia; Cantharellopsis; Contumyces; Cotylidia; Gyroflexus (= Sphagnomphalia); Loreleia; Muscinupta; Repetobasidium; Sidera; Rickenella

Synonyms
- Rickenellaceae Vizzini (2010)

= Repetobasidiaceae =

Family of fungi

Repetobasidiaceae is a phylogenetically defined family encompassing resupinate, poroid, stereoid, clavarioid, and agaricoid fungi, among other forms. Currently no description of the emended family circumscription is available.
