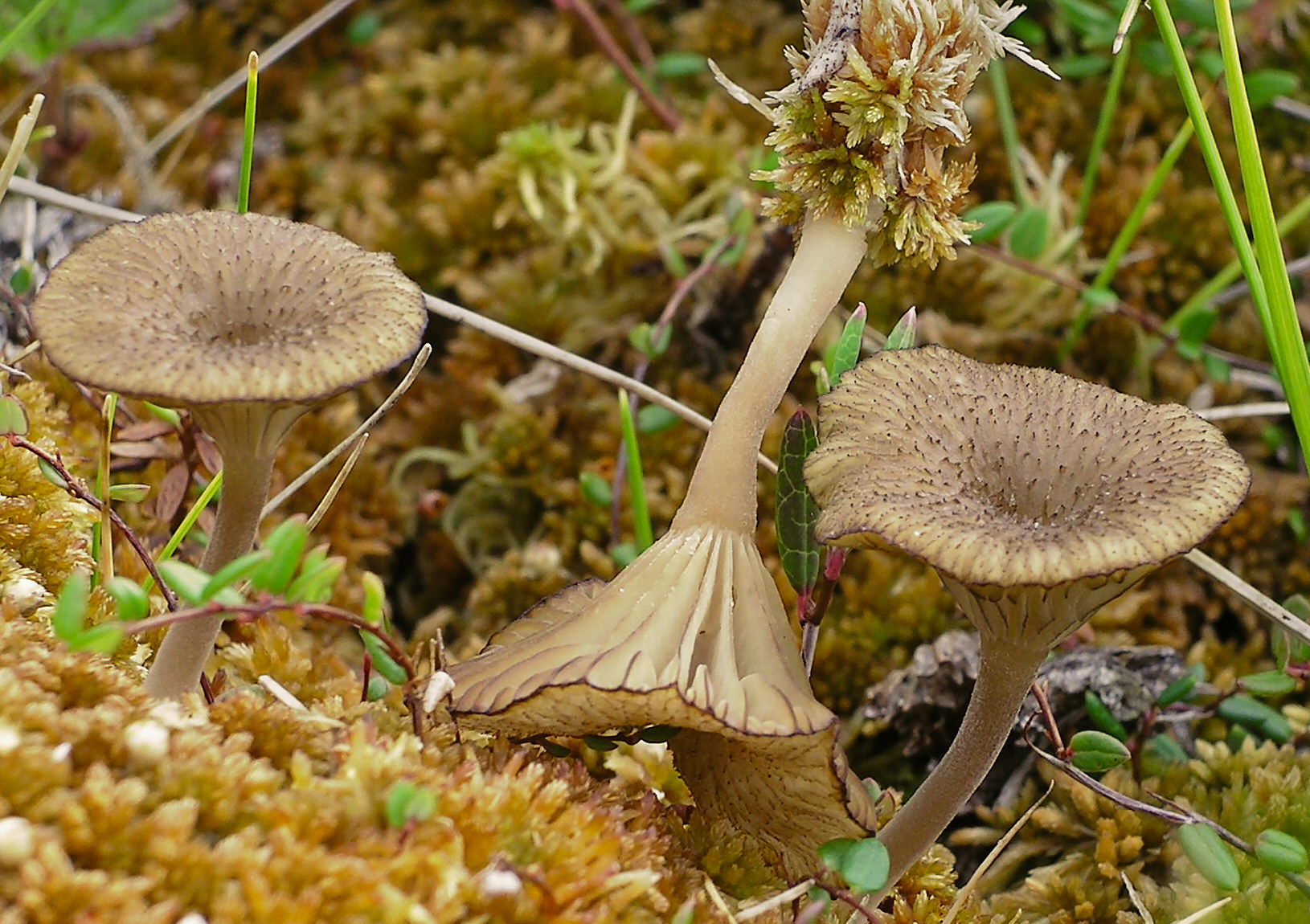
- Omphalina gerardiana

Scientific classification
- Kingdom: Fungi
- Division: Basidiomycota
- Class: Agaricomycetes
- Order: Agaricales
- Family: Tricholomataceae
- Genus: Omphalina; Quél. (1886)

Type species
- Omphalina pyxidata (Bull.) Quél. (1886)

= Omphalina =

Genus of fungi

Omphalina is a genus of small agarics with white, nonamyloid, basidiospores and decurrent gills. Typically the cap has a deep central depression giving the umbrella-like to funnel-shaped cap the appearance of a belly button, or a belly with a navel. Similarly-shaped agarics are said to be omphalinoid in appearance.

== Etymology ==
Omphalina is the diminutive of Omphalia which is a reference to the belly button or navel-like appearance of the small dome-shaped caps with a central depression. It derives from the Greek word omphalos.

== Historical nomenclatural confusion ==
The generic name Omphalina is an ancient one, linked to the even older mushroom name Omphalia which cannot be used because it is an illegitimate later homonym. Historically, the former was generally applied to any white-spored, similarly sized and shaped mushroom. As a result, many species that still are labeled Omphalina, or were labeled Omphalia, are in fact not true Omphalinas. The now conserved type species is Omphalina pyxidata. Prior to conservation of the type, typification was debated and unstable for several decades.

== Phylogenetic redefinition ==
Molecular phylogenetic studies using DNA show this species and others on mosses with reddish brown to yellowish brown pigments that encrust the hyphal walls are related, while many other former Omphalinas are distantly related and are classified in other orders, or families, and in other genera.

== Biology ==
Omphalina in the modern sense is a small genus of bryophyte colonizing mushrooms. They grow on mossy burned soils and in undisturbed mossy areas in Arctic, Antarctic, alpine and rural and urban sites. Many other bryophilous mushrooms occur in such habitats but they have other characteristics.

== Reclassified and excluded former Omphalinas ==
Lichenized omphalinas, which are basidiolichens, are now placed in Lichenomphalia. An example is the species previously known as either Omphalina ericetorum or Omphalina umbellifera that is now called Lichenomphalia umbellifera; etc.

Bryophilous grey to blackish former omphalinas are largely in the genus Arrhenia. Examples are: Omphalina epichysium, now Arrhenia epichysium; Omphalina sphagnicola now Arrhenia sphagnicola; etc.

Any former omphalina with amyloid spores goes into another genus. These genera include Mycena, Myxomphalia, Pseudoarmillariella, Xeromphalina, etc.

No true Omphalina has gelatinized or slimy tissues or brightly colored pigments. Neither do they have cystidia. Excluded species whose exclusion is supported by molecular analysis, include the genera: Blasiphalia, Chrysomphalina, Chromosera, Contumyces, Gerronema, Haasiella, Loreleia, Rickenella, etc.

== Species ==
As of July 2026, the genus Omphalina has 105 accepted species, including:

- Omphalina arctica
- Omphalina chionophila
- Omphalina demissa
- Omphalina fulvopallens
- Omphalina grisea
- Omphalina kuehneri
- Omphalina mutila
- Omphalina nothofaginea
- Omphalina pseudomuralis
- Omphalina pyxidata
- Omphalina rivulicola
- Omphalina subhepatica
- Omphalina wellingtonensis

== See also ==
- List of Tricholomataceae genera
