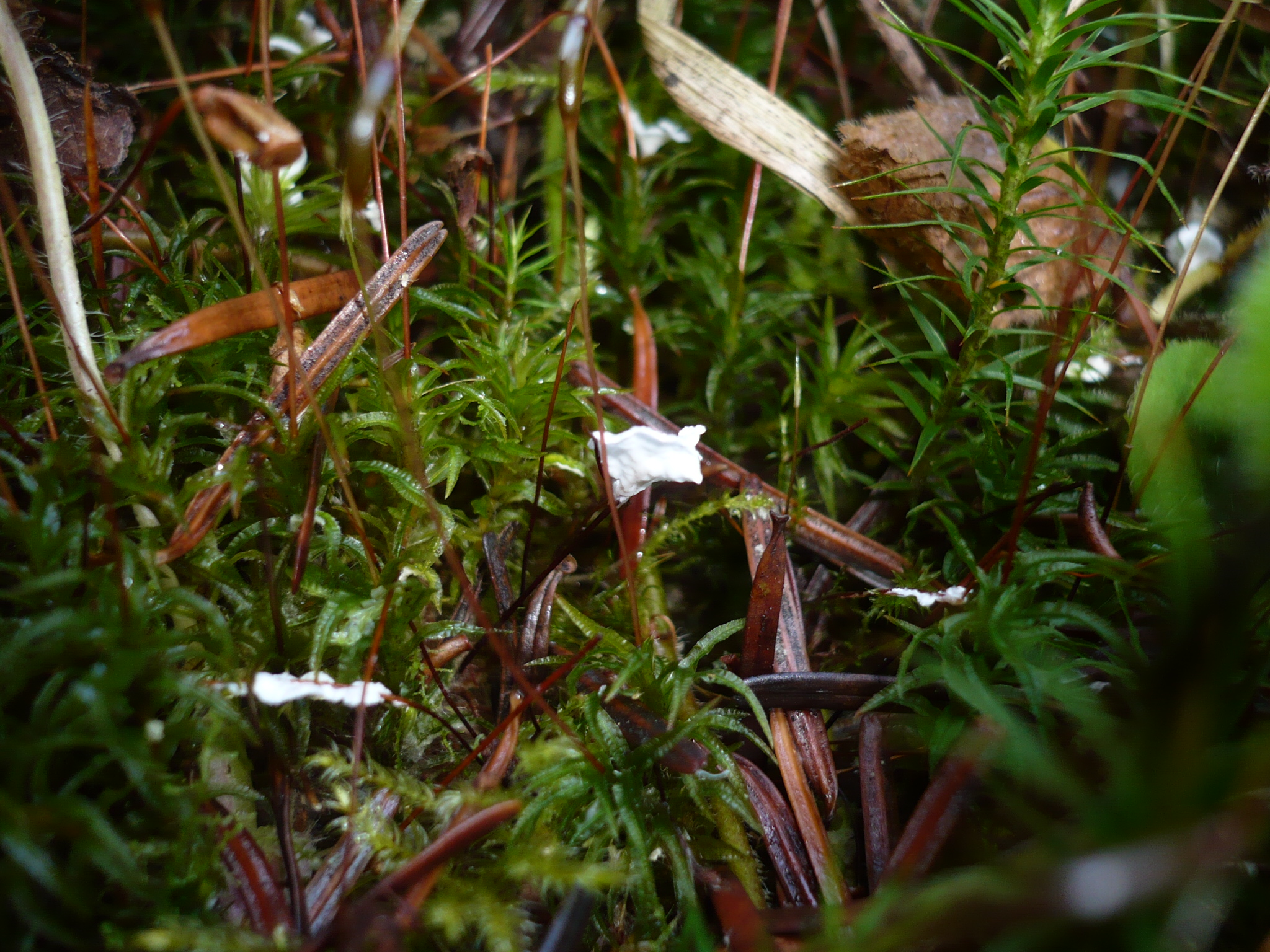

Conservation status
- Vulnerable (NatureServe)

Scientific classification
- Domain: Eukaryota
- Kingdom: Fungi
- Division: Basidiomycota
- Class: Agaricomycetes
- Order: Hymenochaetales
- Family: Repetobasidiaceae
- Genus: Muscinupta; Redhead, Lücking & Lawrey (2009)
- Species: M. laevis

Binomial name
- Muscinupta laevis (Fr.) Redhead, Lücking & Lawrey (2009)

Synonyms
- Thelephora muscigena Pers. (1801); Auricularia muscigena (Pers.) Mérat (1821); Cantharellus laevis Fr. (1821); Thelephora vulgaris Pers. (1822); Cyphella muscigena (Pers.) Fr. (1838); Calyptella muscigena (Pers.) Quél. (1886); Arrhenia muscigena (Pers.) Quél. (1888); Chaetocypha muscigena (Pers.) Kuntze (1891); Cyphella laevis (Fr.) S. Lundell (1953); Leptoglossum laeve (Fr.) W.B.Cooke (1961); Lachnella muscigena (Pers.) G.Cunn. (1963); Cyphellostereum laeve (Fr.) D.A.Reid (1965)

= Muscinupta =

Genus of fungi

Muscinupta is a fungal genus that produces small white delicate fan-shaped to cupulate fruitbodies on mosses. It is monotypic, containing the single species Muscinupta laevis. The type species is better known under the name Cyphellostereum laeve but Cyphellostereum is a basidiolichen.

== Etymology ==
The name Muscinupta refers to both its moss host and an allusion to the marriage of the fungus with the moss together with its veil-like properties on the moss.
