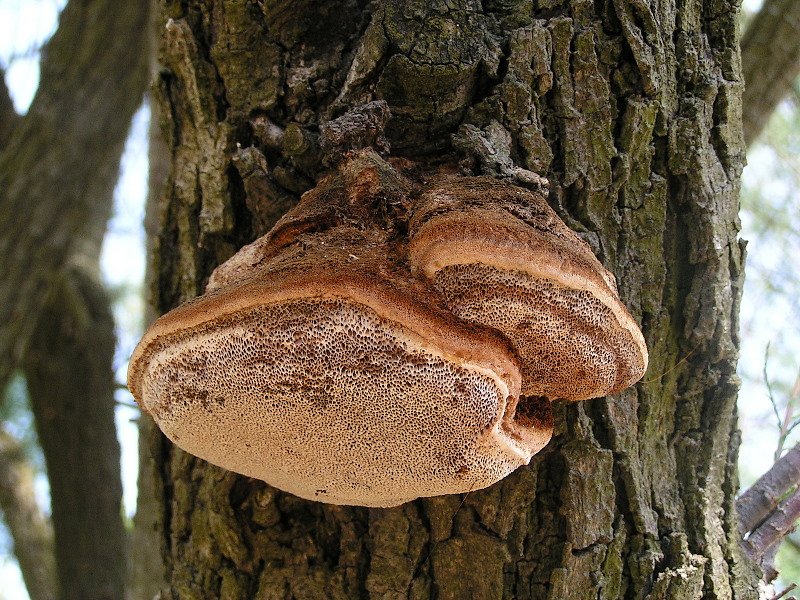
- Inonotus tamaricis

Scientific classification
- Kingdom: Fungi
- Division: Basidiomycota
- Class: Agaricomycetes
- Order: Hymenochaetales; Oberw. (1977)

Families
- Hymenochaetaceae Imazeki & Toki; Repetobasidiaceae Jülich; Schizoporaceae Jülich

= Hymenochaetales =

Hymenochaetales Temporal range: Barremian–Present

Order of fungi

The Hymenochaetales are an order of fungi in the class Agaricomycetes. The order in its current sense is based on molecular research and not on any unifying morphological characteristics. According to one 2008 estimate, the Hymenochaetales contain around 600 species worldwide, mostly corticioid fungi and poroid fungi, but also including several clavarioid fungi and agarics. Species of economic importance include wood decay fungi in the genera Phellinus and Inonotus sensu lato, some of which may cause losses in forestry. Therapeutic properties are claimed for Inonotus obliquus ("chaga") and Phellinus linteus, both of which are now commercially marketed.

== Taxonomy ==
=== History ===
The order was proposed in 1977 to recognize the family Hymenochaetaceae at a higher taxonomic rank. As originally conceived, species within the Hymenochaetales had several morphological features in common, notably brown or brownish basidiocarps (fruit bodies) that turn black in alkali, hyphae lacking clamp connections, and the presence (in most species) of characteristic setae (thick-walled, thorn-shaped cystidia, visible under a hand lens).

Subsequent ultrastructure research showed that the Hymenochaetales had dolipores with imperforate parenthesomes, whereas most Agaricomycetes have dolipores with perforate parenthesomes. Species of the corticioid genera Hyphodontia and Schizopora were later found to share this peculiarity, suggesting they might also be related to the Hymenochaetales, though morphologically dissimilar.

=== Current status ===
Molecular research, based on cladistic analysis of DNA sequences, has substantially expanded and redefined the Hymenochaetales, dividing the order into at least six different clades. The core clade represents the traditional Hymenochaetaceae, excluding the genera Coltricia and Coltriciella; another clade includes the corticioid genera Lyomyces and Schizopora (Schizoporaceae), together with Coltricia and Coltriciella as a subclade; a further clade (Repetobasidiaceae) includes agaricoid Rickenella species, the clavarioid Alloclavaria purpurea, and various corticioid fungi, including the genus Repetobasidium; the three remaining clades consist of corticioid Hyphodontia species, corticioid Kneifiella species, and poroid Oxyporus species.

Not all the species currently placed within the Hymenochaetales have dolipores with imperforate parenthosomes, so the order lacks any shared morphological characteristics.

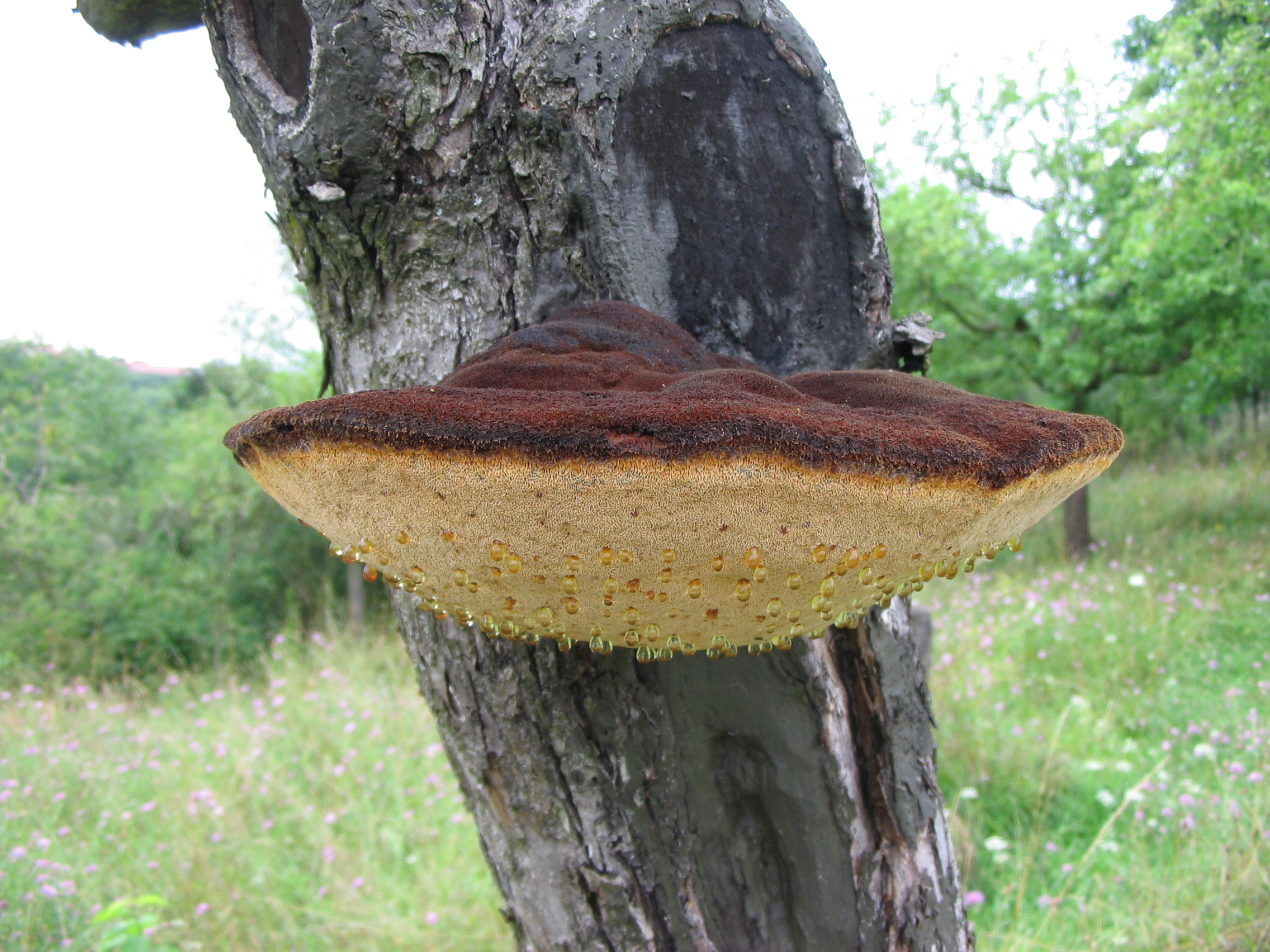
Inonotus hispidus (Hymenochaetaceae)

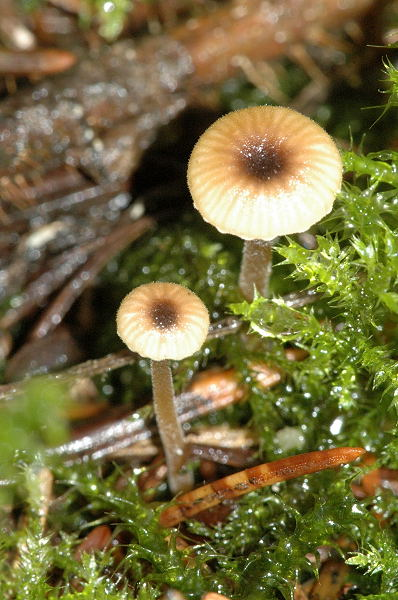
Rickenella swartzii (Repetobasidiaceae)

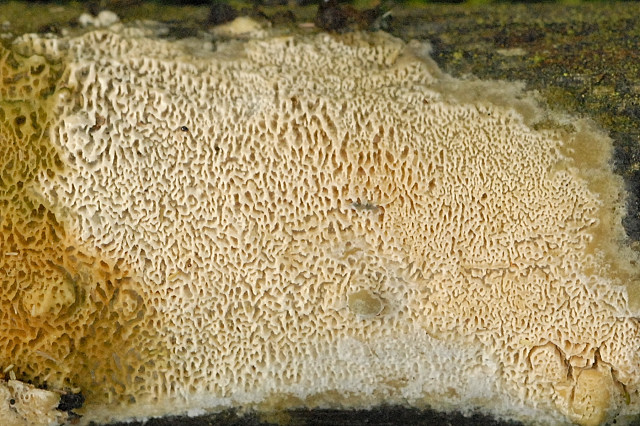
Schizopora paradoxa (Schizoporaceae)

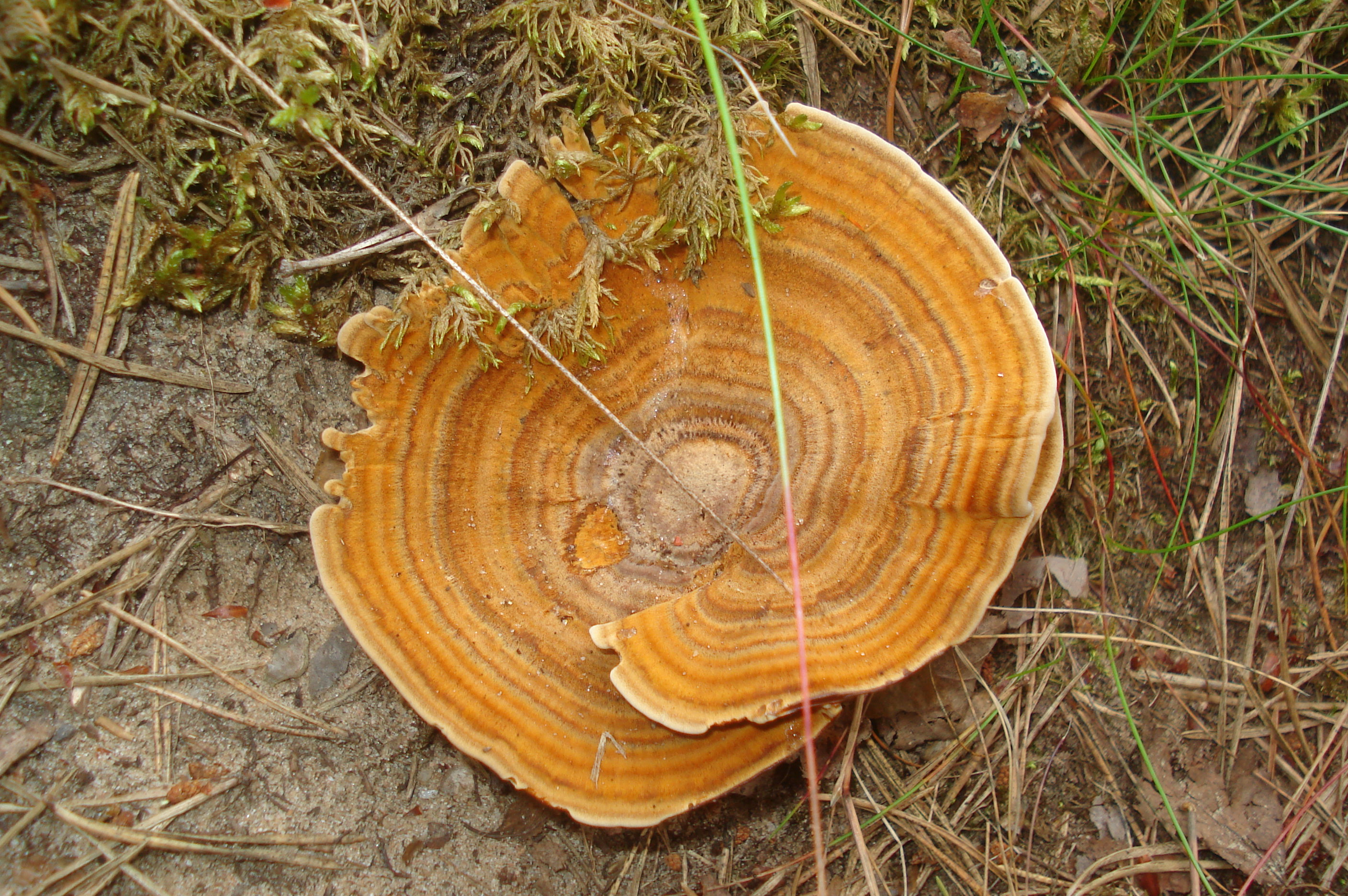
Coltricia perennis
(Coltricia subclade)

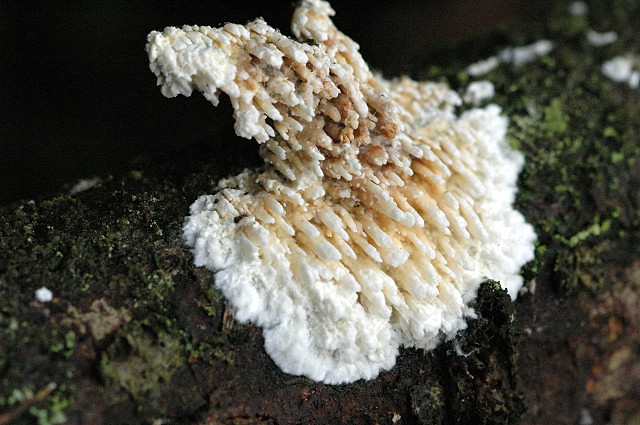
Hyphodontia arguta (Hyphodontia clade)

== Habitat and distribution ==
Most fungi within the order are saprotrophs of dead wood, but some species within the Hymenochaetaceae can cause rots of living trees. Species of Coltricia and Coltriciella are ectomycorrhizal. Agaricoid species of Rickenella and related genera are parasites of mosses and liverworts. Distribution of the Hymenochaetales is cosmopolitan.

== Economic importance ==
Several wood decay fungi in the genera Phellinus and Inonotus sensu lato are pathogenic, causing losses in forestry plantations. Therapeutic properties are claimed for Inonotus obliquus ("chaga") and Phellinus linteus, both of which are commercially marketed as alternative medicines.

== Genera incertae sedis ==
Several genera in the Hymenochatales are incertae sedis with respect to familial placement:

- Atheloderma Parmasto (1968)
- Caeruleomyces Stalpers (2000)
- Cyanotrama Ghob.-Nejh. & Y.C. Dai (2010)
- Fibricium J.Erikss. (1958)
- Ginnsia Sheng H.Wu & Hallenb. (2010)
- Lawrynomyces Karasiński (2013)
- Physodontia Ryvarden & H.Solheim (1977)
- Subulicium Hjortstam & Ryvarden (1979)
- Trichaptum Murrill (1904)
