= Hyphodontia curvispora =

Scientific classification
- Domain: Eukaryota
- Kingdom: Fungi
- Division: Basidiomycota
- Class: Agaricomycetes
- Order: Hymenochaetales
- Family: Schizoporaceae
- Genus: Hyphodontia
- Species: H. curvispora

Binomial name
- Hyphodontia curvispora J.Erikss. & Hjortstam

Species of fungus

Hyphodontia curvispora is a species of fungus belonging to the family Schizoporaceae.

It is native to Europe and Southern America.
