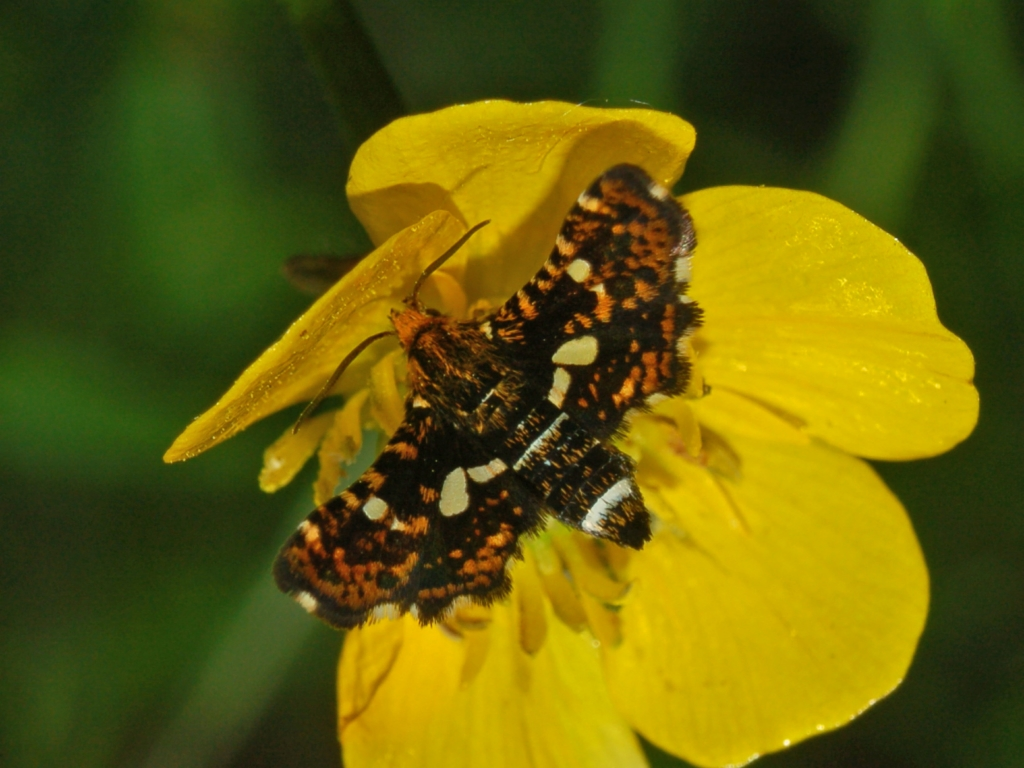
- Thyris fenestrella, upperside
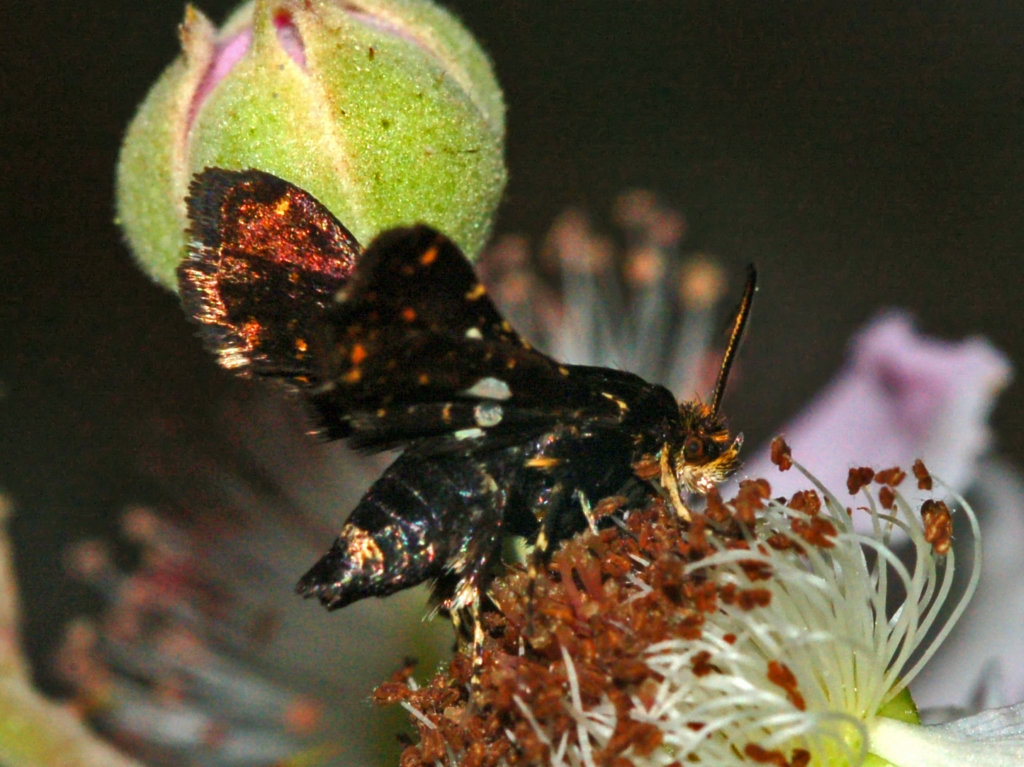
- Lateral view

Scientific classification
- Kingdom: Animalia
- Phylum: Arthropoda
- Clade: Pancrustacea
- Class: Insecta
- Order: Lepidoptera
- Family: Thyrididae
- Genus: Thyris
- Species: T. fenestrella

Binomial name
- Thyris fenestrella (Scopoli, 1763)

Synonyms
- Phalaena fenestrella Scopoli, 1763

= Thyris fenestrella =

Pygmy

Species of moth

Thyris fenestrella, commonly known as the pygmy, is a moth of the family Thyrididae.

== Distribution ==
This species can be found in central and southern Europe and Asia Minor. The species is most frequent in southern Europe.

== Habitat ==
These thermophilous moths mainly inhabit coastal environments, warm forest edges, sunny slopes with calcareous soil, scrub and hedgerows where the host plant grows.

== Description ==
Thyris fenestrella has a wingspan of 15–20 mm. The basic color of the wings is grayish- dusky brown. The frontwings have some orange dots along the front edge and a distinctive slightly translucent whitish patch in the middle of each wing. These almost transparent areas are similar to windows (hence the Latin species name fenestrella, meaning small window). Two of such windows are present also in the middle of the hindwings. The abdomen is blackish-brown, with some slight white cross bands.

The caterpillars can reach a length of about 10 millimetres (0.39 in). They are yellowish or olive green with a slightly transparent skin and numerous large black verrucae. The head is dark brown. Pupa are stubby and reddish brown.

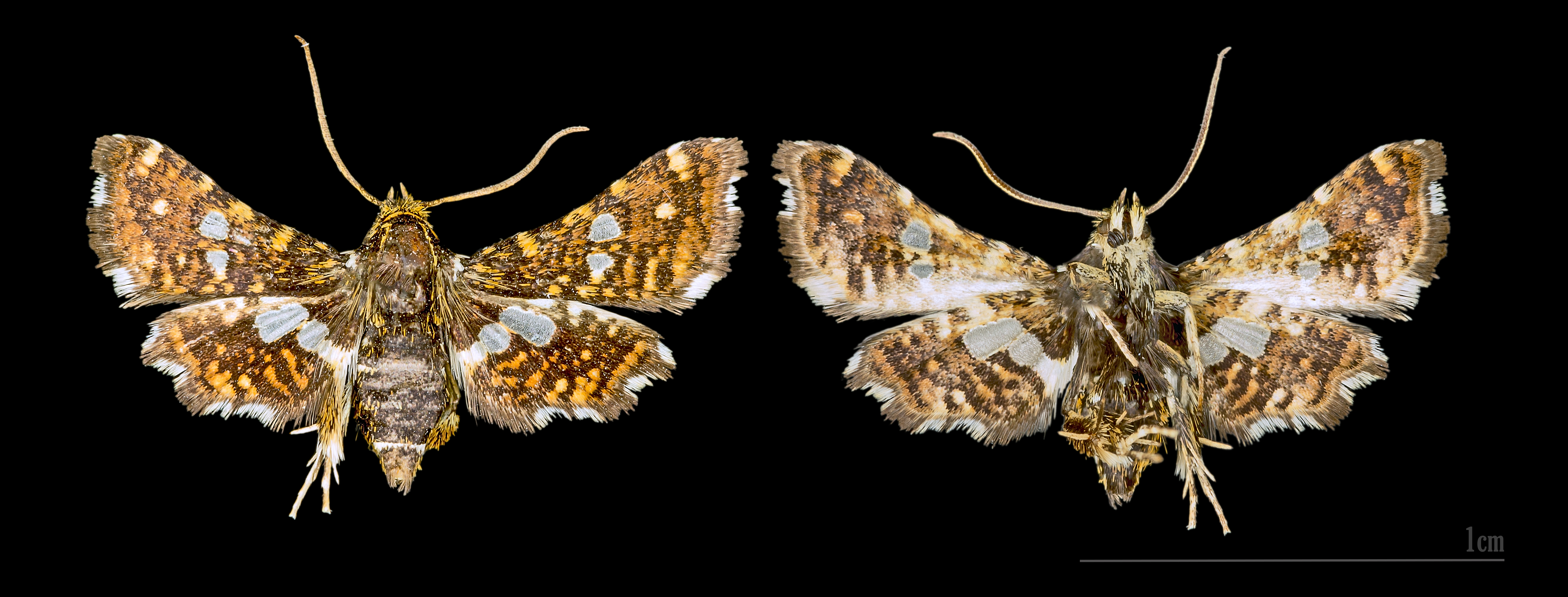
Mounted specimen. Upperside and underside

== Biology ==
This species has two generations a year, hibernating as a chrysalis. Adults are on wing from May until mid-August. They are particularly active in sunny days. The larvae feed on Clematis vitalba, Sambucus nigra, Arctium lappa and are found in July and August.
