= H. aspera =

H. aspera may refer to:

- Hibbertia aspera, the rough Guinea flower, a shrub species native to Australia
- Hydrangea aspera, a shrub species native to the region between the Himalaya, across southern China to Taiwan
- Hyphodontia aspera, a fungal plant pathogen species
- Hypolepis aspera, a fern species in the genus Hypolepis

== See also ==
- Aspera (disambiguation)
