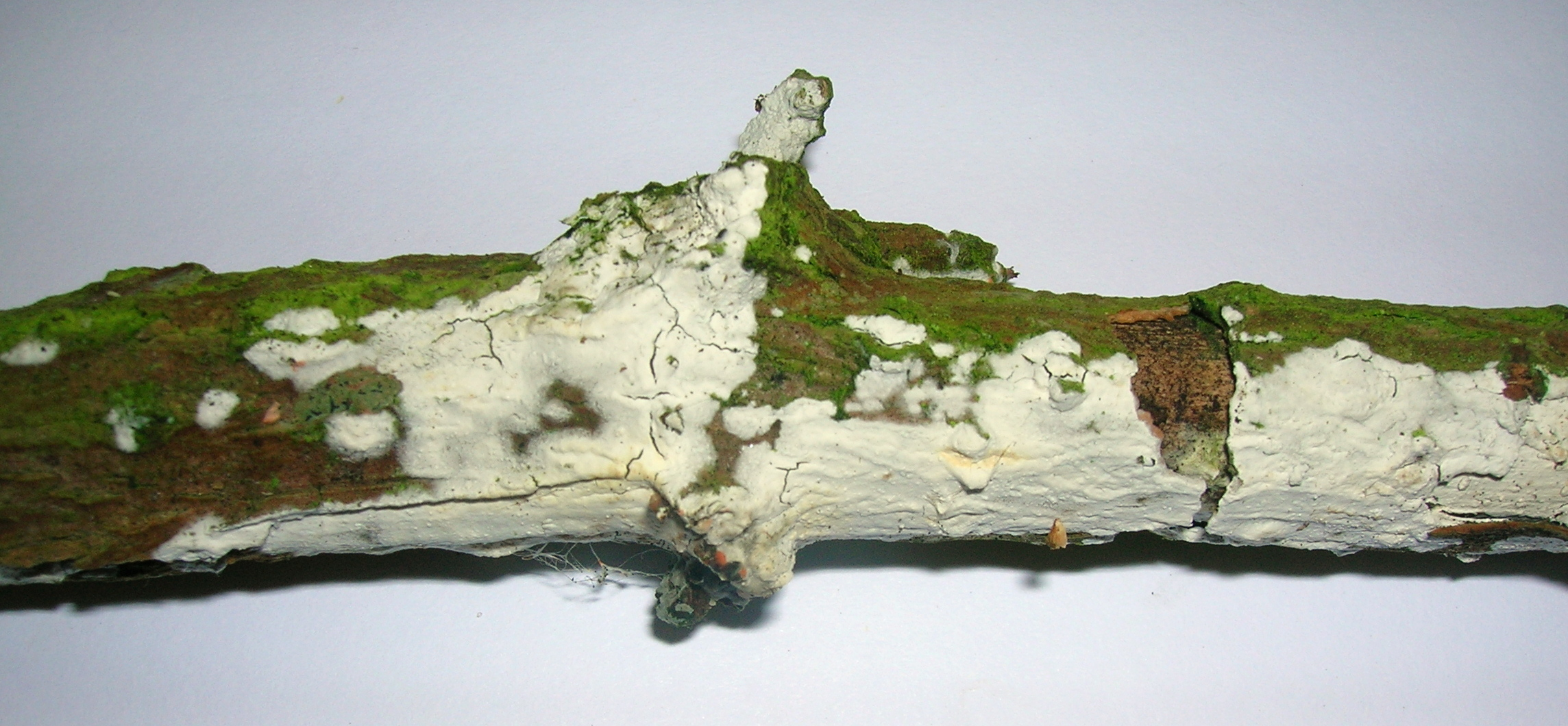
- Elder whitewash on elder (Sambucus nigra) in North Ayrshire, Scotland

Scientific classification
- Kingdom: Fungi
- Division: Basidiomycota
- Class: Agaricomycetes
- Order: Hymenochaetales
- Family: Schizoporaceae
- Genus: Hyphodontia
- Species: H. sambuci

Binomial name
- Hyphodontia sambuci (Fr.) J. Erikss., (1958)

Synonyms
- Hyphoderma sambuci (Pers.) Julich. Lyomyces sambuci

= Hyphodontia sambuci =

Species of fungus

Hyphodontia sambuci, the elder whitewash, is a basidiomycete fungal pathogen on deadwood, especially elder.

It is resupinate, forming a very thin structure which is white, pruinose (flour-like dusting) or chalky in appearance. It is inedible. It also grows on dead but still hanging branches of Fraxinus, Berberis, Nothofagus, Ulmus, Populus, Hedera, Ribes, Symphoricarpos and rarely on conifers such as Cryptomeria.

== Ecology ==
As stated, H. sambuci occurs in North Europe mostly on Sambucus nigra, but there is a much bigger spectrum of substrates in warmer regions in southern areas. The variability of micromorphology increases in the tropics, but the macromorphological characteristics however always stay the same: the basidiocarp with chalky white color and often growing as aerophyte on dead branches of trees and bushes, that are still attached to the tree. H. sambuci consists of a complex of species. Similar species with capitate cystidia; thin-walled hyphae and exactly the same chalky white fruit body are H. griselinae and H. fimbriata. They can be differentiated by their spores and morphology of their basidiocarp.
