= Aspera =

Aspera may refer to:

== Music ==
- Aspera (band), an American indie rock band
- (a)spera, a 2009 album by Mirah
- Above Symmetry, a Norwegian progressive metal band originally known as Aspera
- "Aspera", the lead track from We Will Become Like Birds by Erin McKeown

== Science ==
- Aspera European Astroparticle network, a physics organization

== Technology ==
- Aspera (company) a file transfer software company
- Analyzer of Space Plasmas and Energetic Atoms, an instrument package on the Mars Express and Venus Express spacecraft
- Automatic Space Plasma Experiment with Rotating Analyzer, an instrument on board the Phobos 2 spacecraft

== Biology and Anatomy ==
- Ulmus 'Aspera', a kind of elm tree
- Aspera, a nomen superfluum for the Rubiaceae genus Galium
- Aspera (coral), a genus of coral
- H. aspera (disambiguation), several species of plants
- Linea aspera, a bone structure in human anatomy

== Other ==
- Per aspera ad astra, a Latin phrase
