= Hyphodontia aspera =

Scientific classification
- Domain: Eukaryota
- Kingdom: Fungi
- Division: Basidiomycota
- Class: Agaricomycetes
- Order: Hymenochaetales
- Family: Schizoporaceae
- Genus: Hyphodontia
- Species: H. aspera

Binomial name
- Hyphodontia aspera (Fr.) J.Erikss. (1958)

Synonyms
- Grandinia aspera Fr. (1874); Odontia arguta subsp. aspera (Fr.) Bourdot & Galzin (1928); Odontia aspera (Fr.) Pilát (1934); Odontia irregularis H.Furuk. (1974); Kneiffiella aspera (Fr.) Jülich & Stalpers (1980)

Species of fungus

Hyphodontia aspera is a species of fungus in the family Schizoporaceae.
