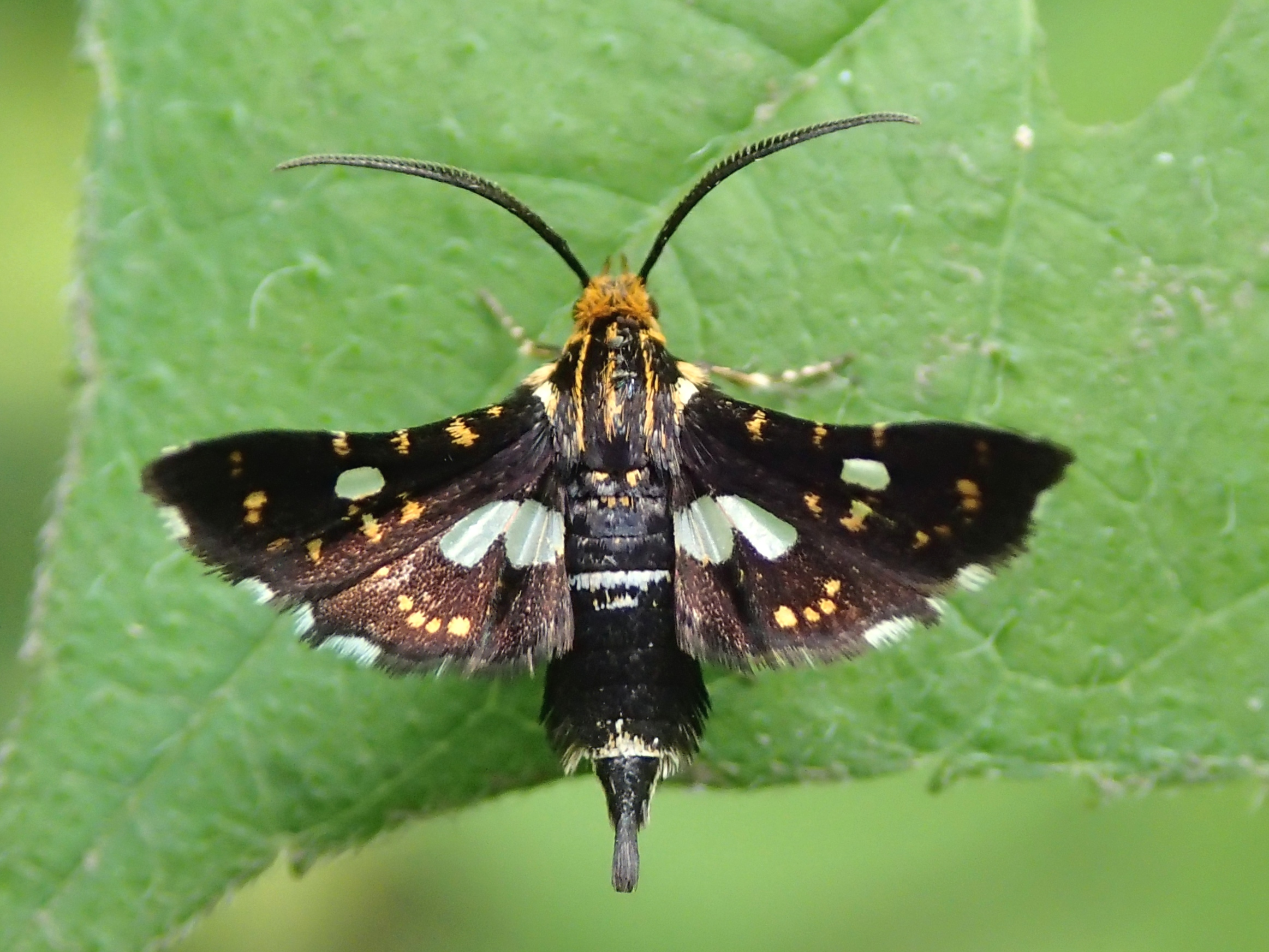
- male

Scientific classification
- Kingdom: Animalia
- Phylum: Arthropoda
- Class: Insecta
- Order: Lepidoptera
- Superfamily: Thyridoidea
- Family: Thyrididae
- Subfamily: Thyridinae
- Genus: Thyris
- Species: T. usitata

Binomial name
- Thyris usitata Butler, 1879

Synonyms
- Thyris unifenestrella Bryk, 1942

= Thyris usitata =

Species of moth

Thyris usitata is a moth of the family Thyrididae. It is found in Russia and Japan.

== Subspecies ==
- Thyris usitata siberica (South Siberian Mountains)
- Thyris usitata usitata (Sakhalin)
- Thyris usitata ussuriensis (Amur and Primorye Region)
