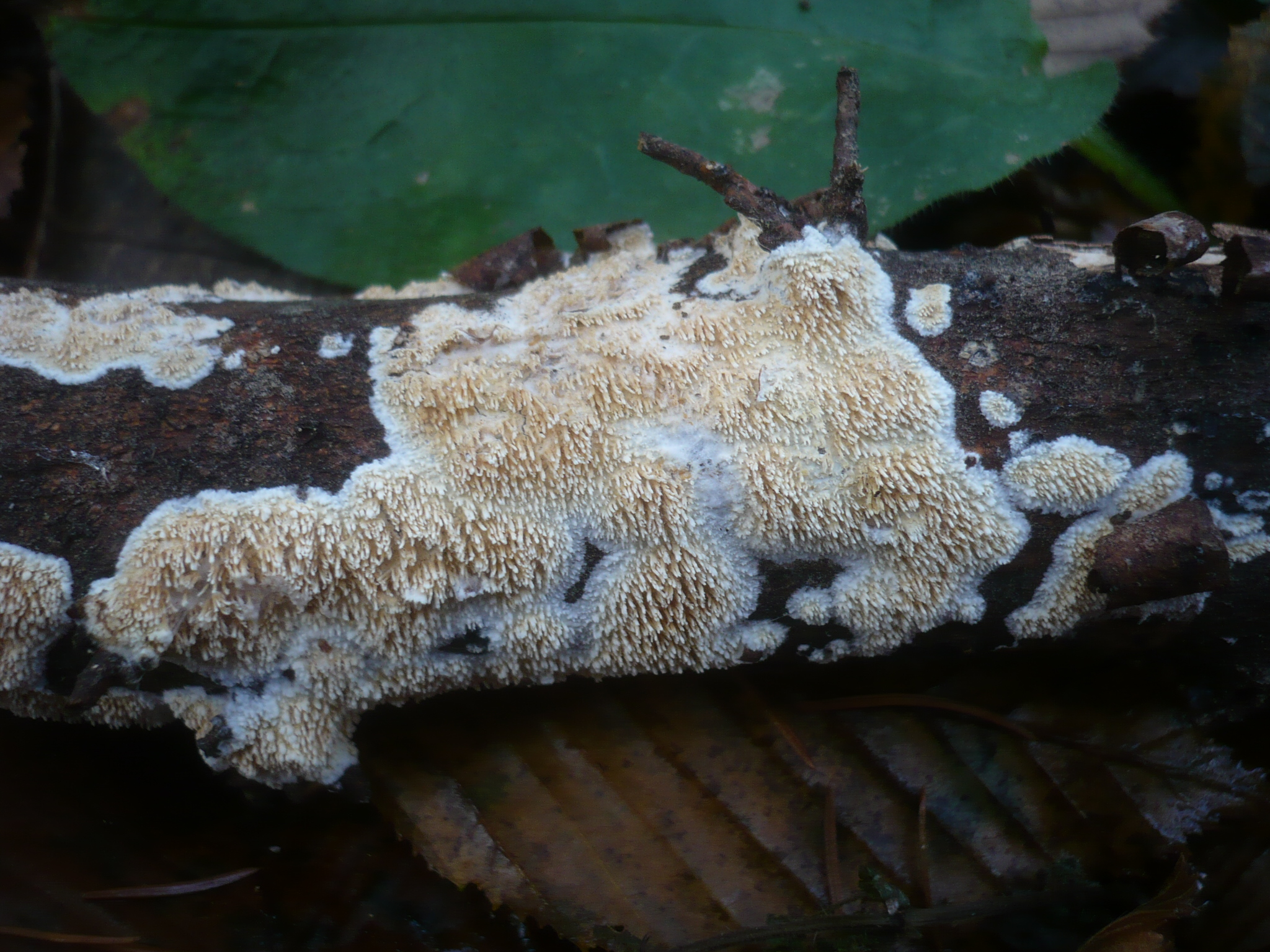
- Basidioradulum radula

Scientific classification
- Kingdom: Fungi
- Division: Basidiomycota
- Class: Agaricomycetes
- Order: Hymenochaetales
- Family: Schizoporaceae
- Genus: Basidioradulum; Nobles (1967)

Type species
- Basidioradulum radula (Fr.) Nobles (1967)

Species
- Basidioradulum crustosum; Basidioradulum dentatum; Basidioradulum radula; Basidioradulum syringae; Basidioradulum tuberculatum

= Basidioradulum =

Genus of fungi

Basidioradulum is a genus of corticioid fungi in the family Schizoporaceae. It was circumscribed by Canadian mycologist Mildred Katherine Nobles in 1967. The type species B. radula was formerly in Hydnum.
