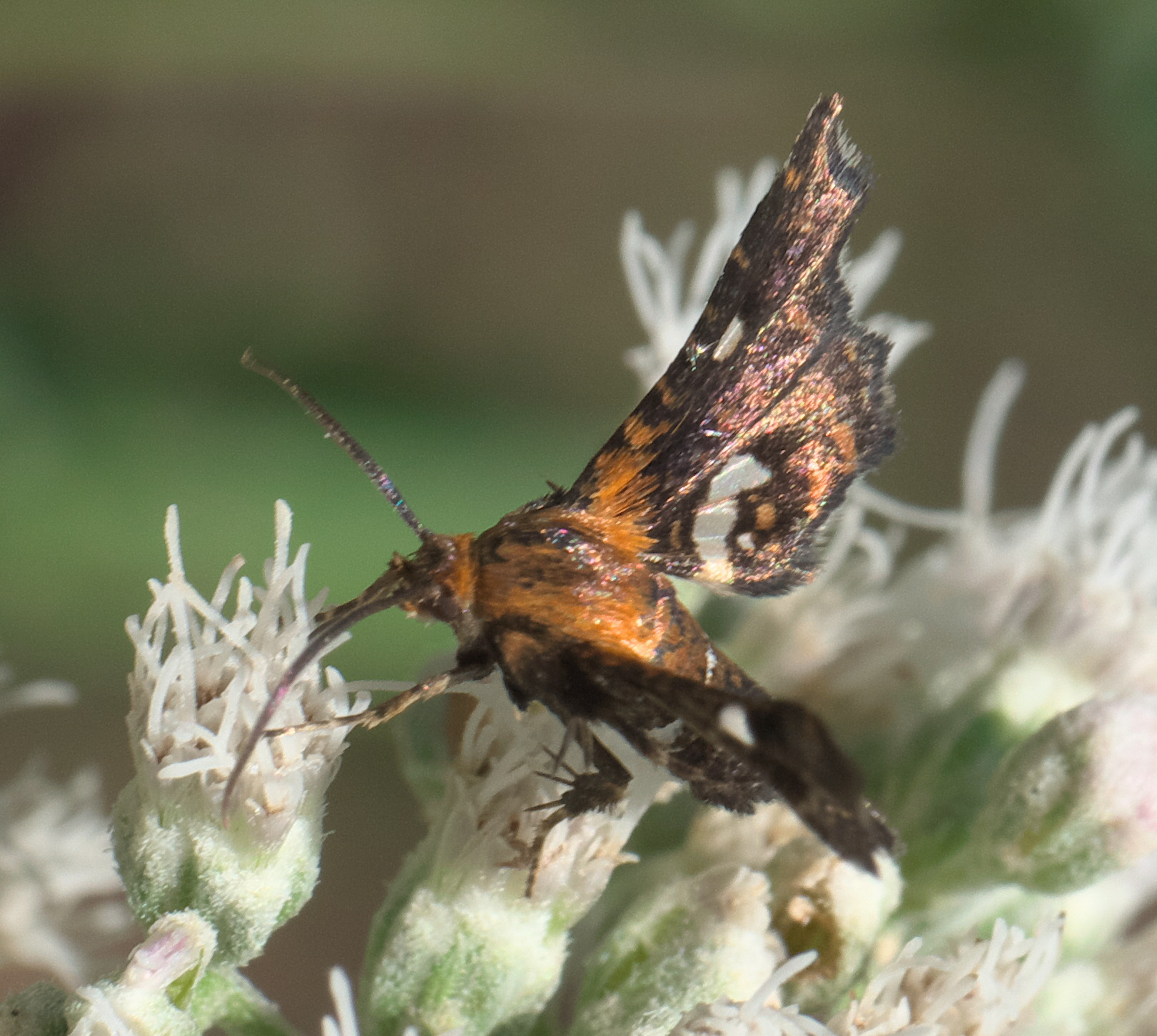

Scientific classification
- Kingdom: Animalia
- Phylum: Arthropoda
- Class: Insecta
- Order: Lepidoptera
- Family: Thyrididae
- Genus: Thyris
- Species: T. maculata

Binomial name
- Thyris maculata Harris, 1839

= Thyris maculata =

Species of moth

Thyris maculata, the spotted thyris, is a species of window-winged moth in the family Thyrididae.

The MONA or Hodges number for Thyris maculata is 6076.

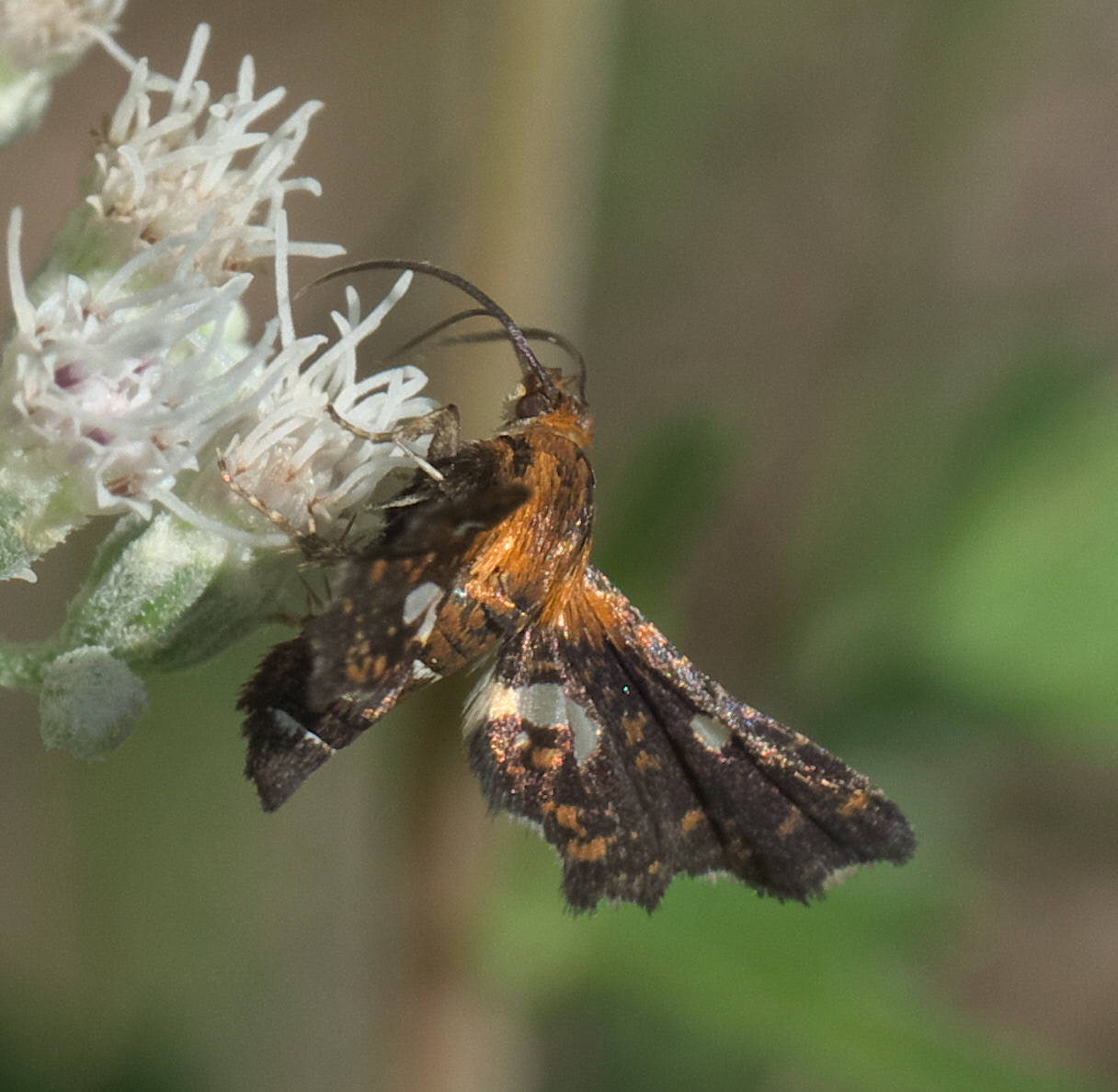
Spotted Thyris (Hodges #6076), Thyris maculata, Pryor, OK, USA

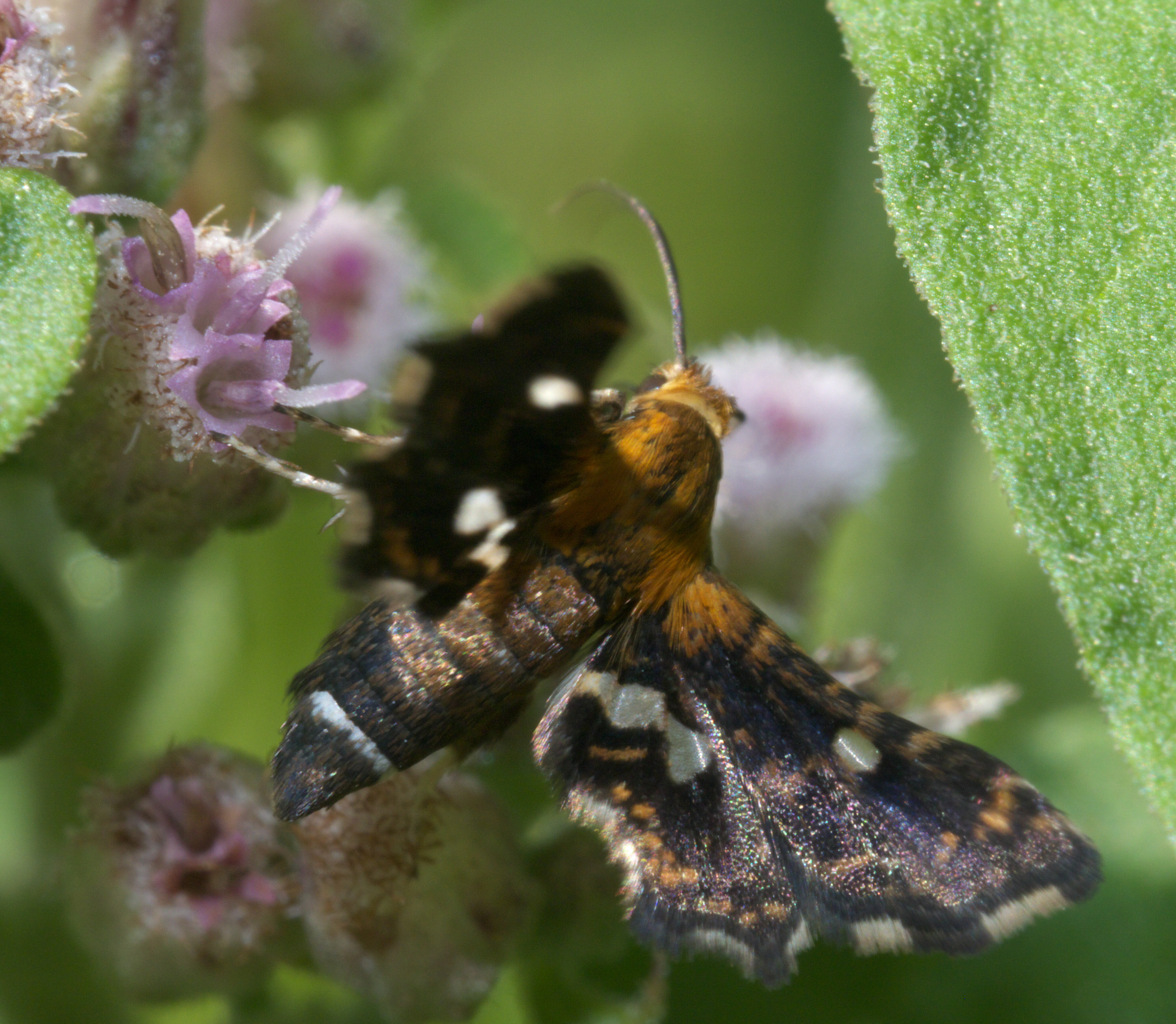
Spotted Thyris (Hodges #6076), Thyris maculata, Pryor, OK, USA
