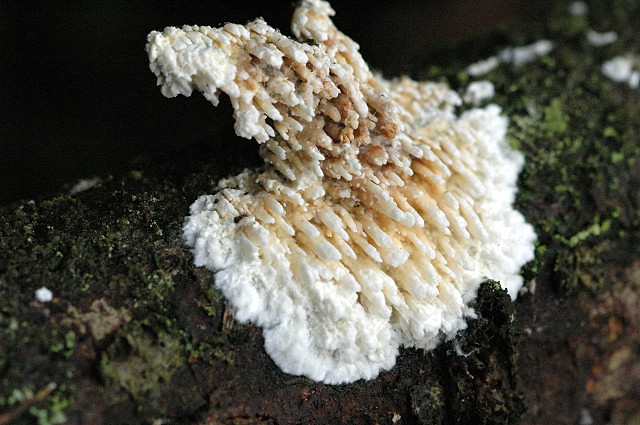
- Hyphodontia arguta

Scientific classification
- Domain: Eukaryota
- Kingdom: Fungi
- Division: Basidiomycota
- Class: Agaricomycetes
- Order: Hymenochaetales
- Family: Schizoporaceae
- Genus: Hyphodontia; J.Erikss. (1958)

Type species
- Hyphodontia pallidula (Bres.) J.Erikss. (1958)

Synonyms
- Grandinia Fr. (1838); Kneiffiella P.Karst. (1889); Chaetoporellus Bondartsev & Singer (1941); Chaetoporellus Bondartsev & Singer ex Singer (1944)

= Hyphodontia =

Genus of fungi

Hyphodontia is a genus of fungi in the family Hymenochaetaceae (Schizoporaceae in Index Fungorum). The genus was circumscribed by Swedish mycologist John Eriksson in 1958.

== Species ==
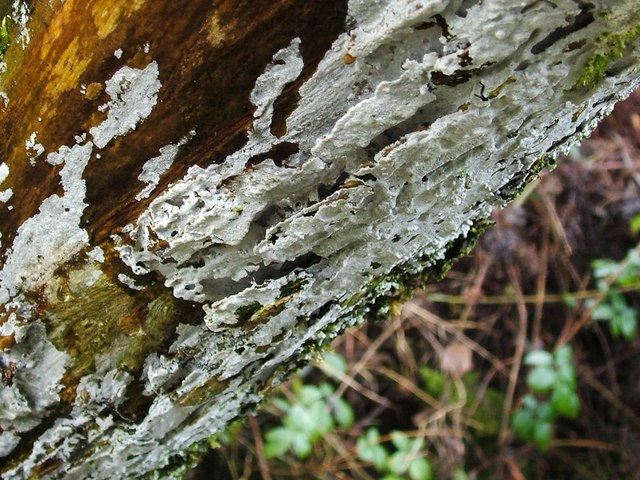
H. sambuci

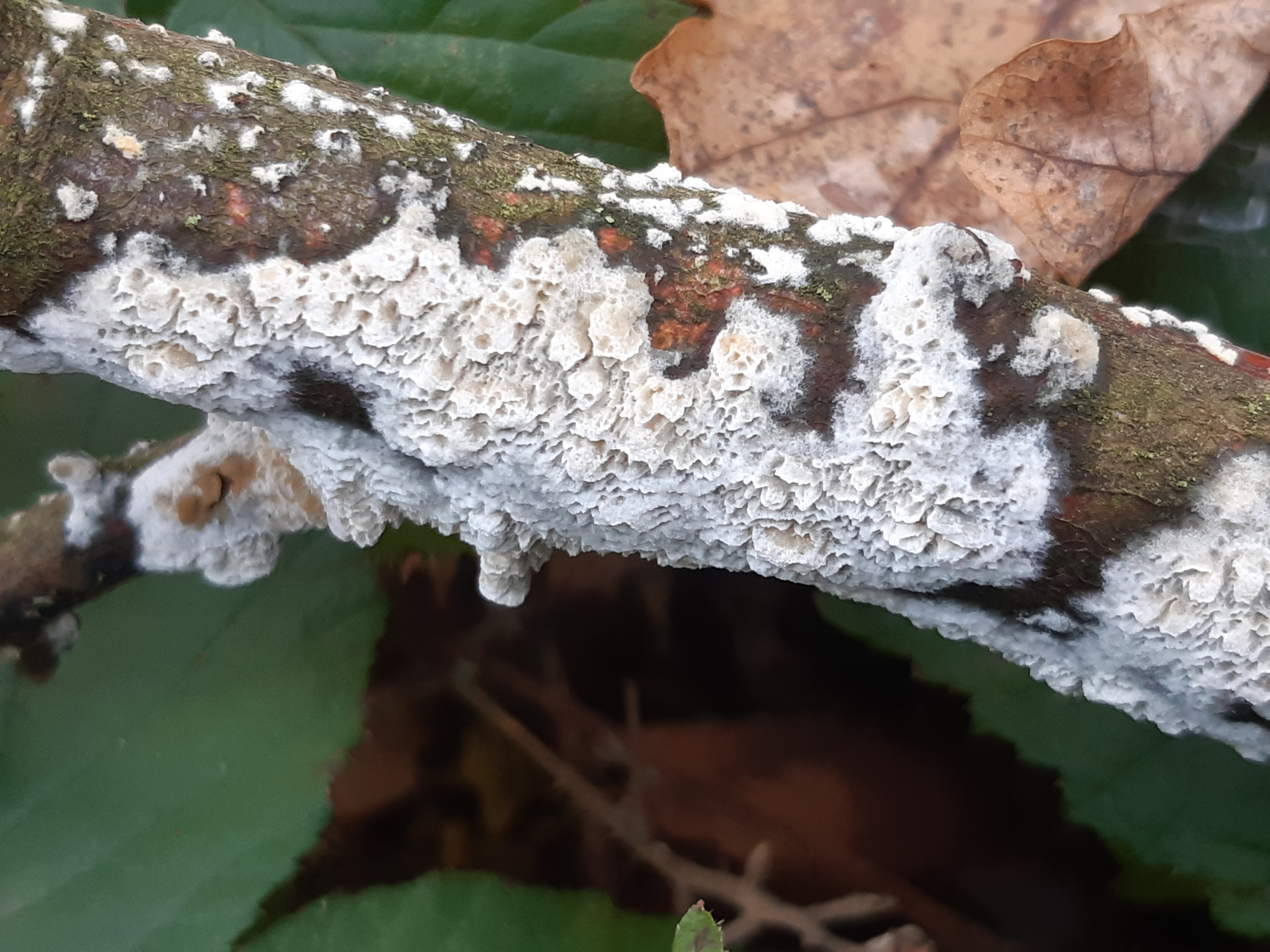
H. radula

- H. abieticola
- H. adhaerispora
- H. alba
- H. alienata
- H. aloha
- H. altaica
- H. alutaria
- H. apacheriensis
- H. arguta
- H. aspera
- H. barba-jovis
- H. boninensis
- H. borealis
- H. breviseta
- H. byssoidea
- H. candidissima
- H. capitata
- H. cineracea
- H. crassispora
- H. crustosoglobosa
- H. cunninghamii
- H. curvispora
- H. efibulatav
- H. erastii
- H. erikssoniiv
- H. fimbriata
- H. fimbriiformis
- H. floccosa
- H. gossypina
- H. hallenbergii
- H. halonata
- H. hastata
- H. hastifera
- H. juniperi
- H. knysnana
- H. lanata
- H. latitans
- H. macrescens
- H. magnifica
- H. microspora
- H. mollis
- H. nespori
- H. nesporina
- H. niemelaei
- H. nothofagi
- H. nudiseta
- H. ochroflava
- H. orasinusensis
- H. ovispora
- H. pallidula
- H. papillosa
- H. pelliculae
- H. poroideoefibulata
- H. propinqua
- H. pruniacea
- H. pumilia
- H. quercina
- H. radula
- H. rimosissima
- H. sambuci
- H. serpentiformis
- H. setulosa
- H. spathulata
- H. sphaerospora
- H. stipata
- H. subalutacea
- H. subdetritica
- H. subglobosa
- H. subscopinella
- H. subspathulata
- H. taiwaniana
- H. tenuicystidia
- H. tropica
- H. tuberculata
- H. tubuliformis
