= Alutaceodontia =

Scientific classification
- Kingdom: Fungi
- Division: Basidiomycota
- Class: Agaricomycetes
- Order: Hymenochaetales
- Family: Schizoporaceae
- Genus: Alutaceodontia (Parmasto) Hjortstam & Ryvarden

Genus of fungi

Alutaceodontia is a genus of fungi belonging to the family Schizoporaceae.

The genus has almost cosmopolitan distribution.

Species:

- Alutaceodontia alutacea (Fr.) Hjortstam & Ryvarden
