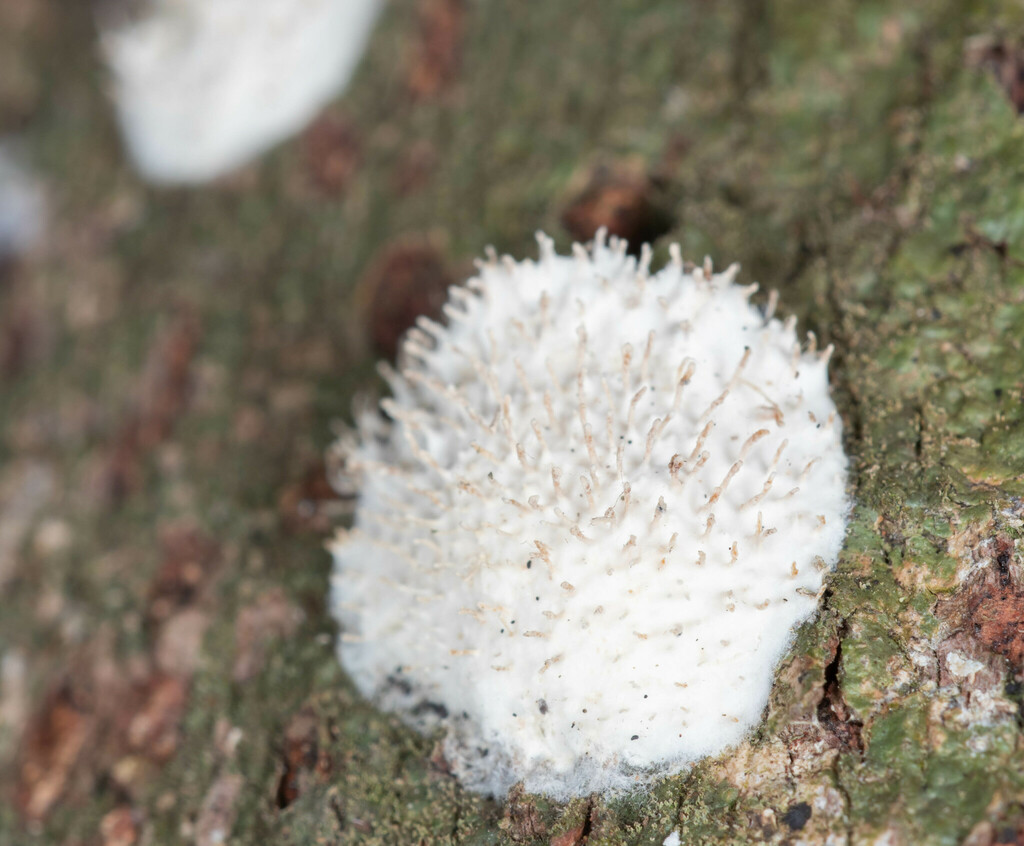
- Echinoporia hydnophora

Scientific classification
- Kingdom: Fungi
- Division: Basidiomycota
- Class: Agaricomycetes
- Order: Hymenochaetales
- Family: Schizoporaceae
- Genus: Echinoporia; Ryvarden

Type species
- Echinoporia hydnophora

= Echinoporia =

Genus of fungi

Echinoporia is a genus of polypore, wood-inhabiting fungi comprising three accepted species in the family Schizoporaceae. Hairs on the pileus possessing asexual thick-walled spores, chlamydospores, is a defining trait of the genus. In 1980, Ryvarden established the genus for the type species, Echinoporia hydnophora (Berk. & Broome) Ryvarden (1980). In 1984, Ryvarden added another species. In 2008, Coelho described the third species of the genus.

The genus name is derived from the ancient Greek word "ἐχῖνος" (ekhînos) for porcupine/sea urchin. "Echino" means "prickly" or "spiny". Fungi in this genus are ivory- white or brown and appear "prickly" as its name suggests.

== Taxonomy ==
Before Echinoporia was coined, an alternative, unpublished name Echinodia Pat. was unofficially used to term the genus.

Echinoporia belongs to the family Schizoporaceae in the order Hymenochaetales. However, the classification of Echinoporia is not fully resolved and is contested. Researchers in 2023 present evidence that Echinoporia can be subsumed in the monotypic family Chaetoporellaceae, enlarging the family. The evidence presented suggests that morphological differences between Echinoporia and Kniefiella, the sole genus of Chaetoporellaceae will not affect taxonomic classification within the same family.

=== Species ===
There are three recognised and accepted species:

- Echinoporia hydnophora (Berk. & Broome) Ryvarden (1980)
- Echinoporia aculeifera (Berk. & M.A. Curtis) Ryvarden 1984
- Echinoporia inermis G. Coelho (2008)

== Geographic distribution ==
Two species of the genus, E. aculeifera and E. inermis have a Neotropical distribution, primarily found in South America and the Caribbean. E. inermis is an endemic species from Brazil. The type species of the genus, E. hydnophora has a Paleotropical distribution, found in parts of Southeast Asia, namely Indonesia, Malaysia, Sri Lanka and as of 2005, East Asia, Taiwan.
