= Palifer =

Scientific classification
- Kingdom: Fungi
- Division: Basidiomycota
- Class: Agaricomycetes
- Order: Hymenochaetales
- Family: Schizoporaceae
- Genus: Palifer; Stalpers & P.K.Buchanan (1991)

Type species
- Lagarobasidium detriticum (Bres.) Jülich (1955)

Species
- P. gamundiae P. hjortstamii P. verecundus P. wrightii

Genus of fungi

Palifer is a genus of corticioid fungi in the Schizoporaceae family. Circumscribed in 1991, the widely distributed genus contains four species.
