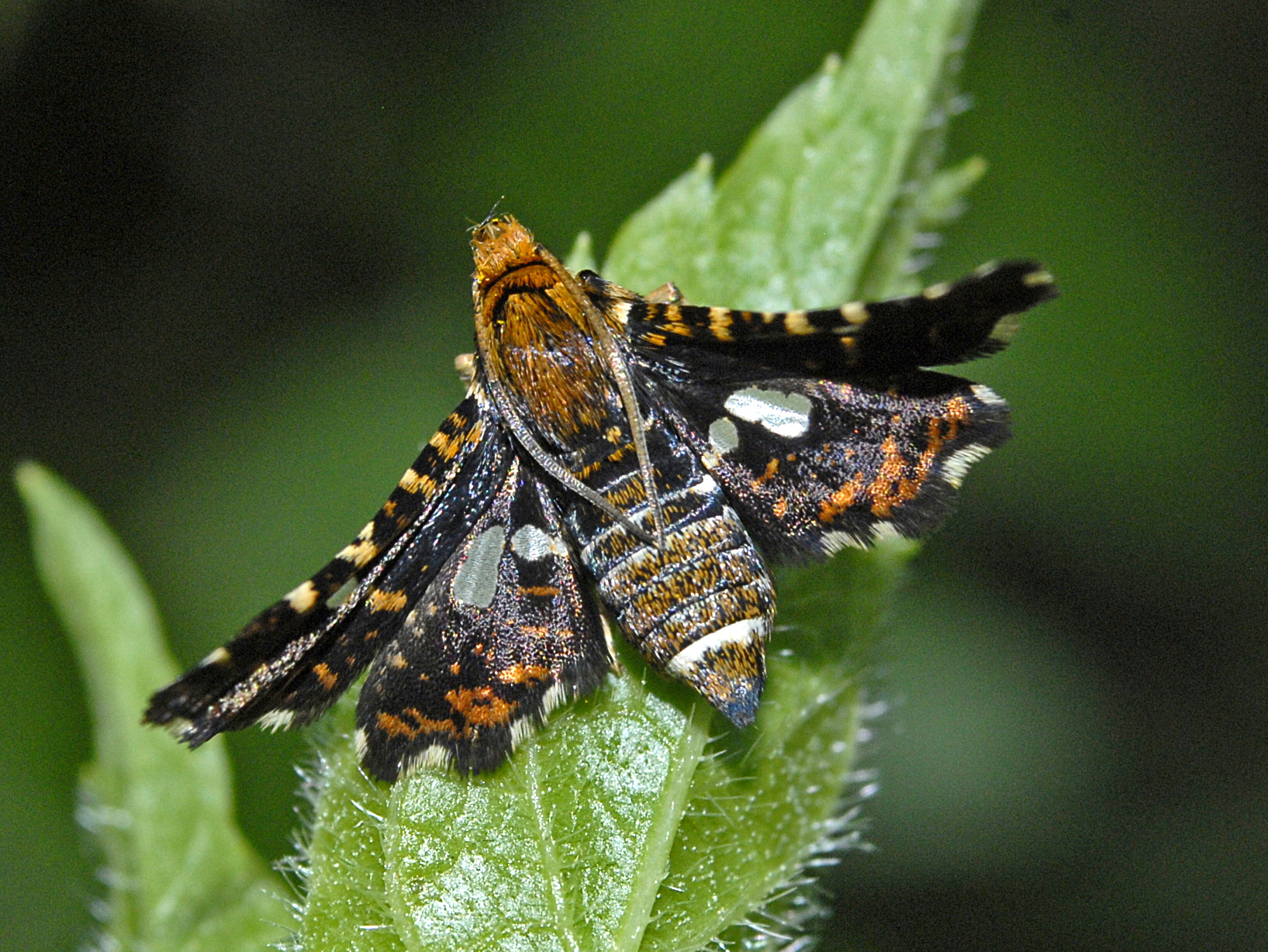
- Thyris fenestrella

Scientific classification
- Kingdom: Animalia
- Phylum: Arthropoda
- Class: Insecta
- Order: Lepidoptera
- Family: Thyrididae
- Subfamily: Thyridinae
- Genus: Thyris; Laspeyrés, 1803

= Thyris =

Genus of moths

Thyris is a genus of moths of the family Thyrididae.

== Species ==
- Thyris borealis
- Thyris diaphana
- Thyris euxina
- Thyris fenestrella
- Thyris kasachstanica
- Thyris maculata
- Thyris nigra
- Thyris siberica
- Thyris sinicaensis
- Thyris tarbagataica
- Thyris usitata
- Thyris ussuriensis
- Thyris vitrina
