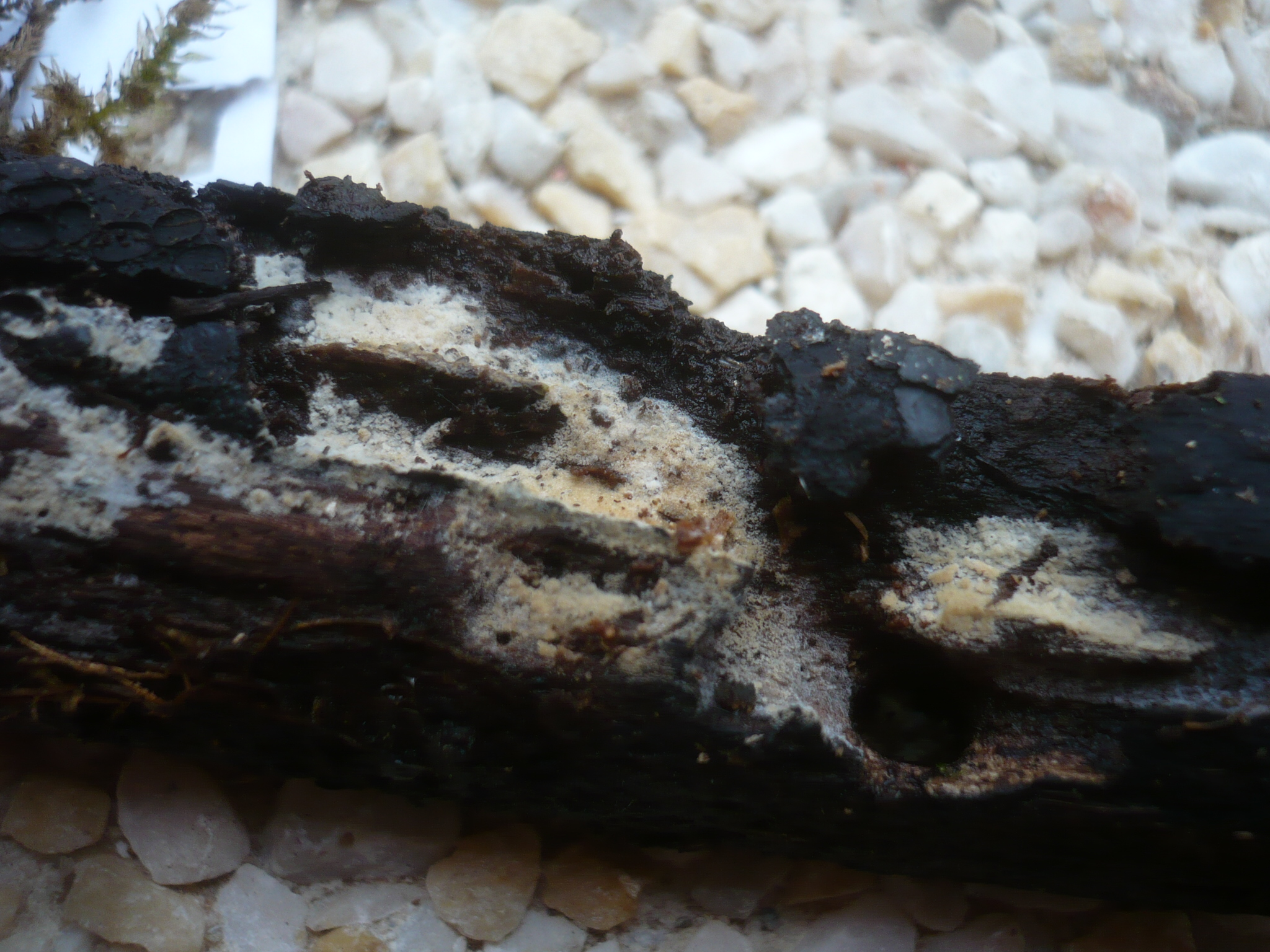
- Lagarobasidium detriticum

Scientific classification
- Kingdom: Fungi
- Division: Basidiomycota
- Class: Agaricomycetes
- Order: Hymenochaetales
- Family: Schizoporaceae
- Genus: Lagarobasidium; Jülich (1974)

Type species
- Lagarobasidium detriticum (Bres.) Jülich (1974)

Species
- L. calongei L. cymosum L. detriticum

= Lagarobasidium =

Genus of fungi

Lagarobasidium is a genus of corticioid fungi in the Schizoporaceae family. Circumscribed by Swiss mycologist Walter Jülich in 1974, the genus contains three species.
