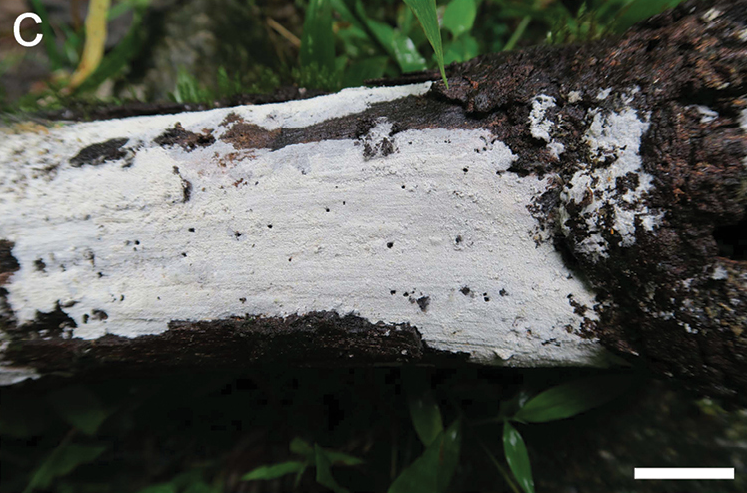
- Fibrodontia alba

Scientific classification
- Kingdom: Fungi
- Division: Basidiomycota
- Class: Agaricomycetes
- Order: Trechisporales
- Family: Hydnodontaceae
- Genus: Fibrodontia; Parmasto (1968)

Type species
- Fibrodontia gossypina Parmasto (1968)

Species
- F. alba F. brevidens F. tomentosa

= Fibrodontia =

Genus of fungi

Fibrodontia is a genus of fungi in the Hydnodontaceae family. The widely distributed genus was circumscribed by Erast Parmasto in 1968. According to Index Fungorum, the type species Fibrodontia gossypina is currently known as Hyphodontia gossypina (Parmasto) Hjortstam.
