= Ulmus 'Aspera' =

Elm cultivar

- Genus: Ulmus
- Cultivar: 'Aspera'
- Origin: England

The elm cultivar Ulmus 'Aspera' was listed (as U. stricta aspera) without description by Loddiges, (Hackney, London), in his catalogue of 1823. Considered only "possibly procera" by Green.

== Description ==
Not available. The name suggests sharp-pointed leaves.

== Cultivation ==
No specimens are known to survive.
