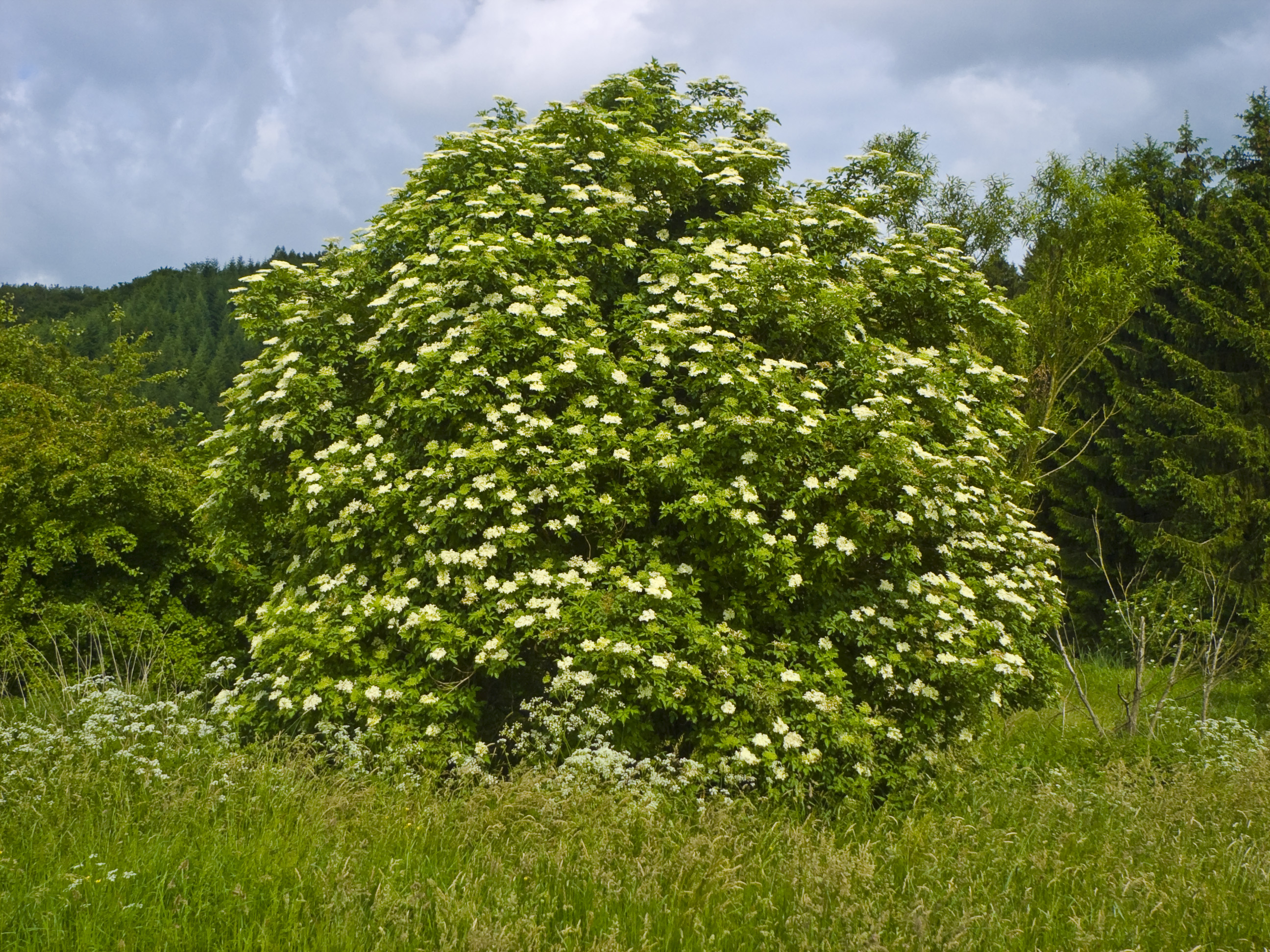
- Shrub in flower

Conservation status
- Least Concern (IUCN 3.1)

Scientific classification
- Kingdom: Plantae
- Clade: Tracheophytes
- Clade: Angiosperms
- Clade: Eudicots
- Clade: Asterids
- Order: Dipsacales
- Family: Viburnaceae
- Genus: Sambucus
- Species: S. nigra

Binomial name
- Sambucus nigra L.
- Sambucus nigra is native to the Azores, Europe, and the Middle East

= Sambucus nigra =

Species of flowering plant in the moschatel family

Sambucus nigra is a temperate species of tree or shrub in the family Viburnaceae native to the Azores, Europe, and the Middle East. Common names include elder, common elder, black elder, European elder, and also elderberry for the fruit, and elderflower for the flowers. It grows in a variety of conditions including both wet and dry fertile soils, primarily in sunny locations. The plant is widely grown as an ornamental shrub or small tree.

Both the flowers and the berries have a long tradition of culinary use, primarily for cordial and wine. Although the plant is commonly used in dietary supplements and traditional medicine, there is no clinical evidence that it provides any health effect.

== Description ==
Common elder is a deciduous shrub or small tree often growing to 6–10 metres (20–33 ft) tall; exceptionally, trees can reach 15 m (49 ft) tall. They typically live for up to 60 years, taking 10-20 years to reach maturity, but can exceptionally reach over 200 years. The bark, light yellowish-grey when young, changes to a coarse yellowish-grey outer bark with deep lengthwise furrowing, lenticels prominent. The leaves are arranged in opposite pairs, 10–30 cm (4–12 in) long, pinnate with five to seven (rarely nine) leaflets, the leaflets 5–12 cm (2–5 in) long and 3–5 cm (1.2–2.0 in) broad, with a serrated margin. The young stems are hollow.

The hermaphroditic flowers have five stamens, which are borne in large, flat corymbs 8–24 cm in diameter in late spring to mid-summer (late May, June, July). The individual flowers are ivory white, 5.5–7.5 millimetres (0.22–0.30 in) in diameter, with five petals, and despite having no nectar, produce a strong scent which attracts pollinating flies, beetles, and bees.

The fruit is a glossy, dark purple to black drupe 5–6 mm diameter containing 3-5 seeds, produced in drooping clusters in late autumn. The dark colour of elderberries results from their rich phenolic content, particularly from anthocyanins.

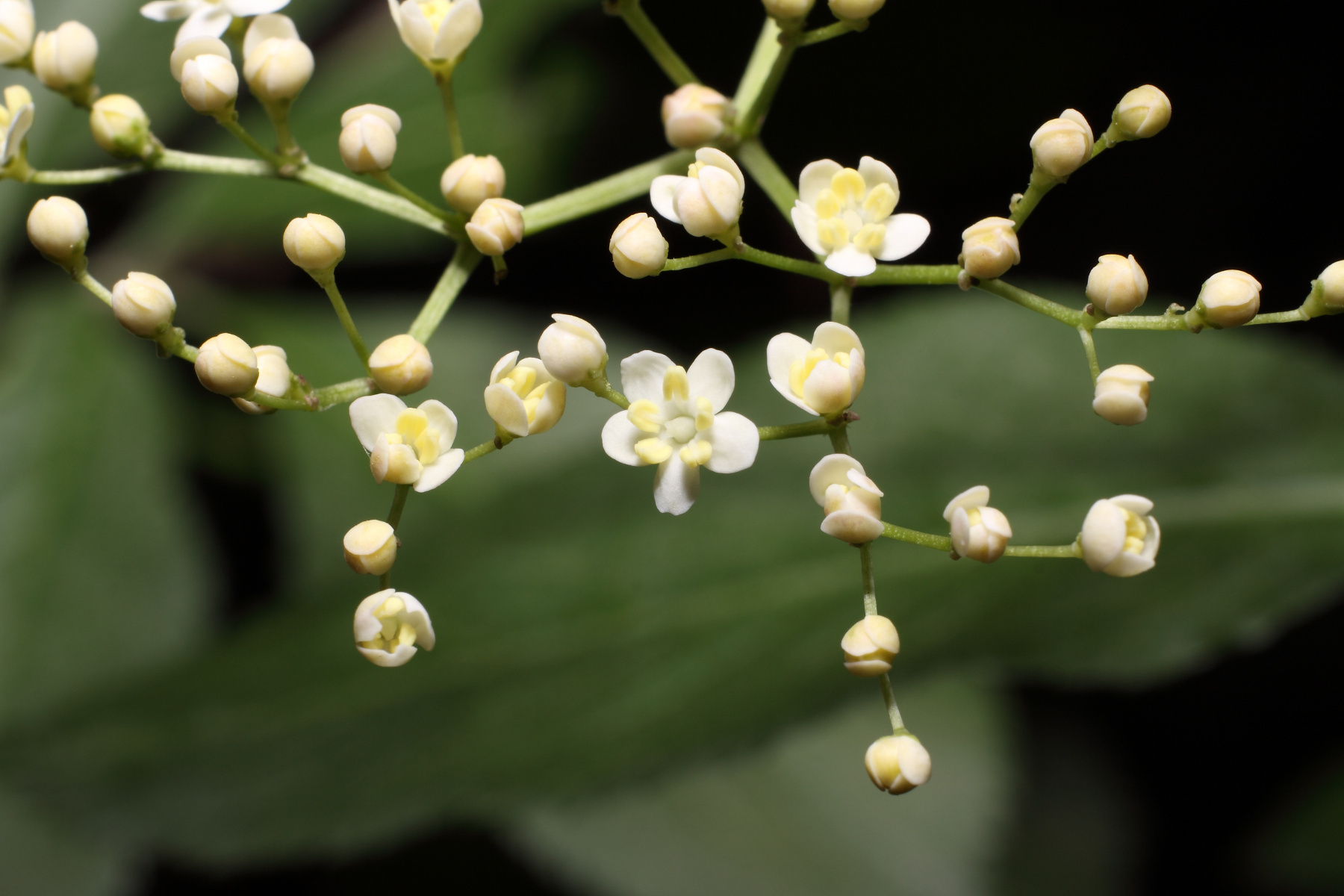
Flowers

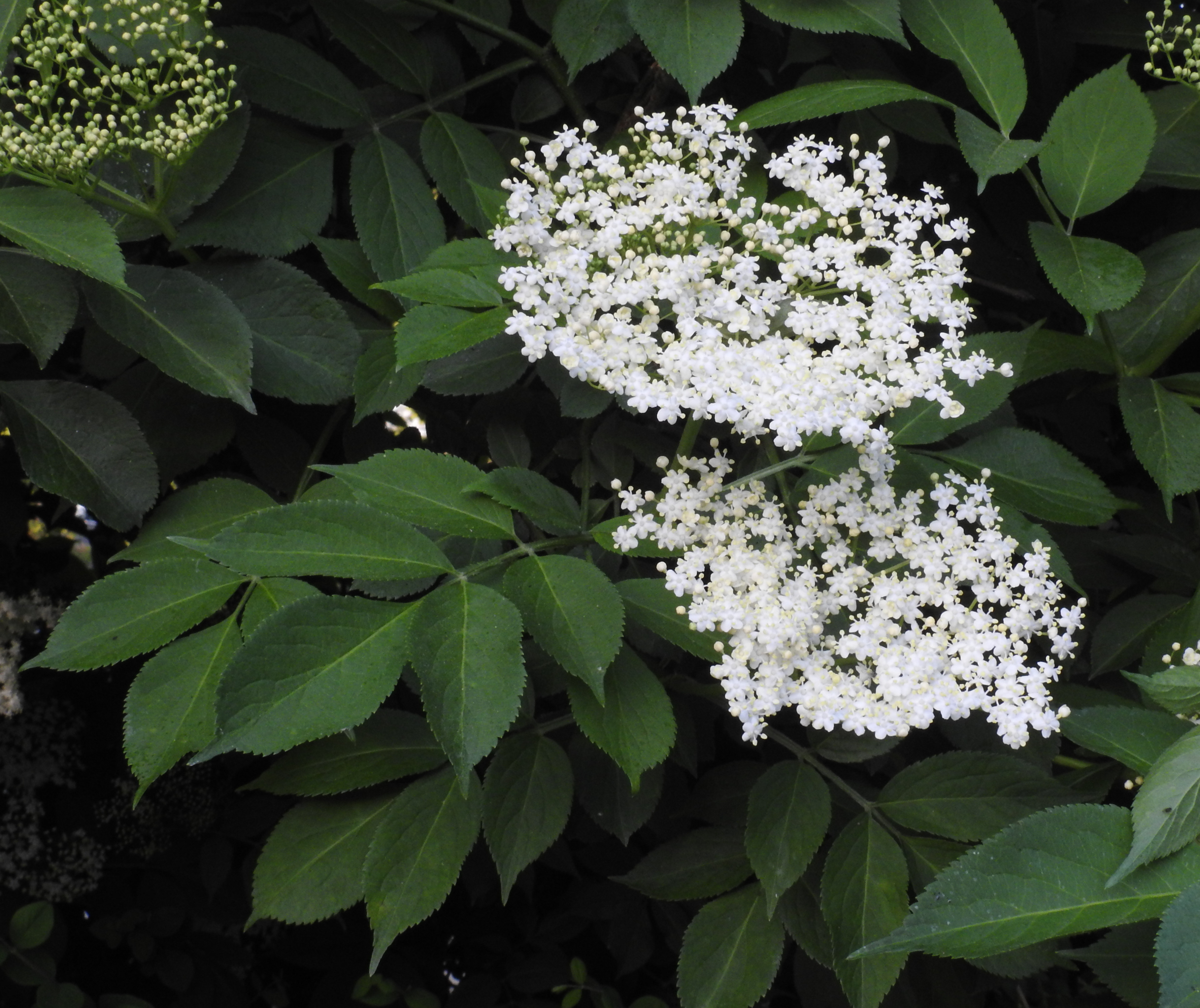
Inflorescences and leaves

Leaves

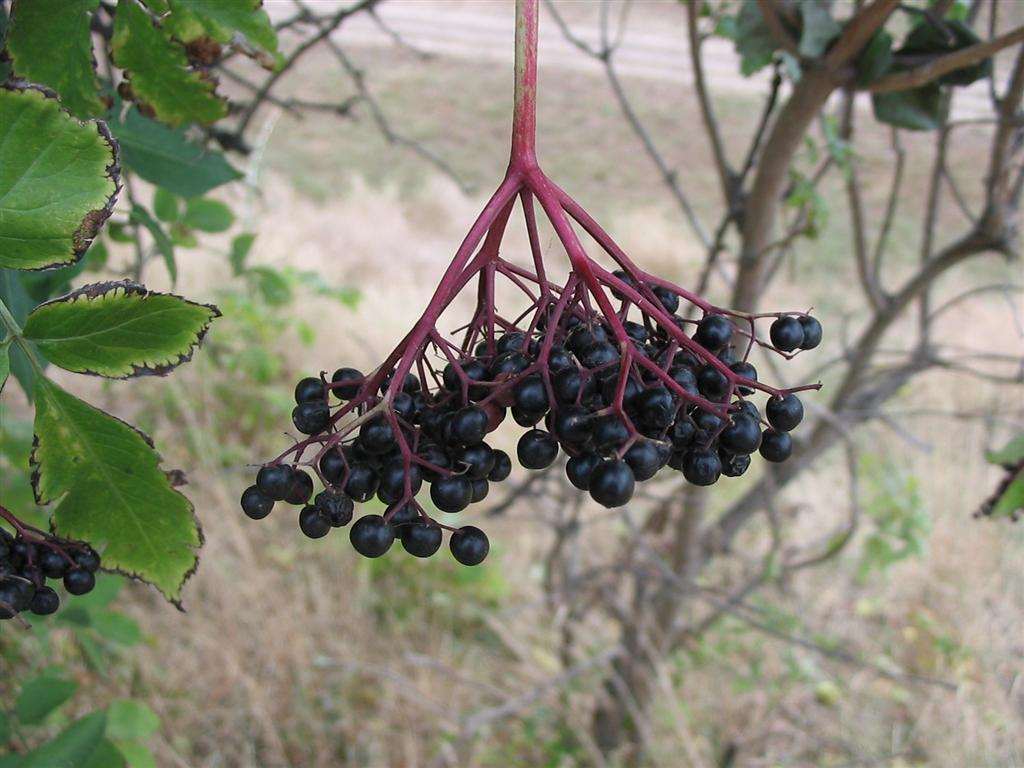
Fruit cluster

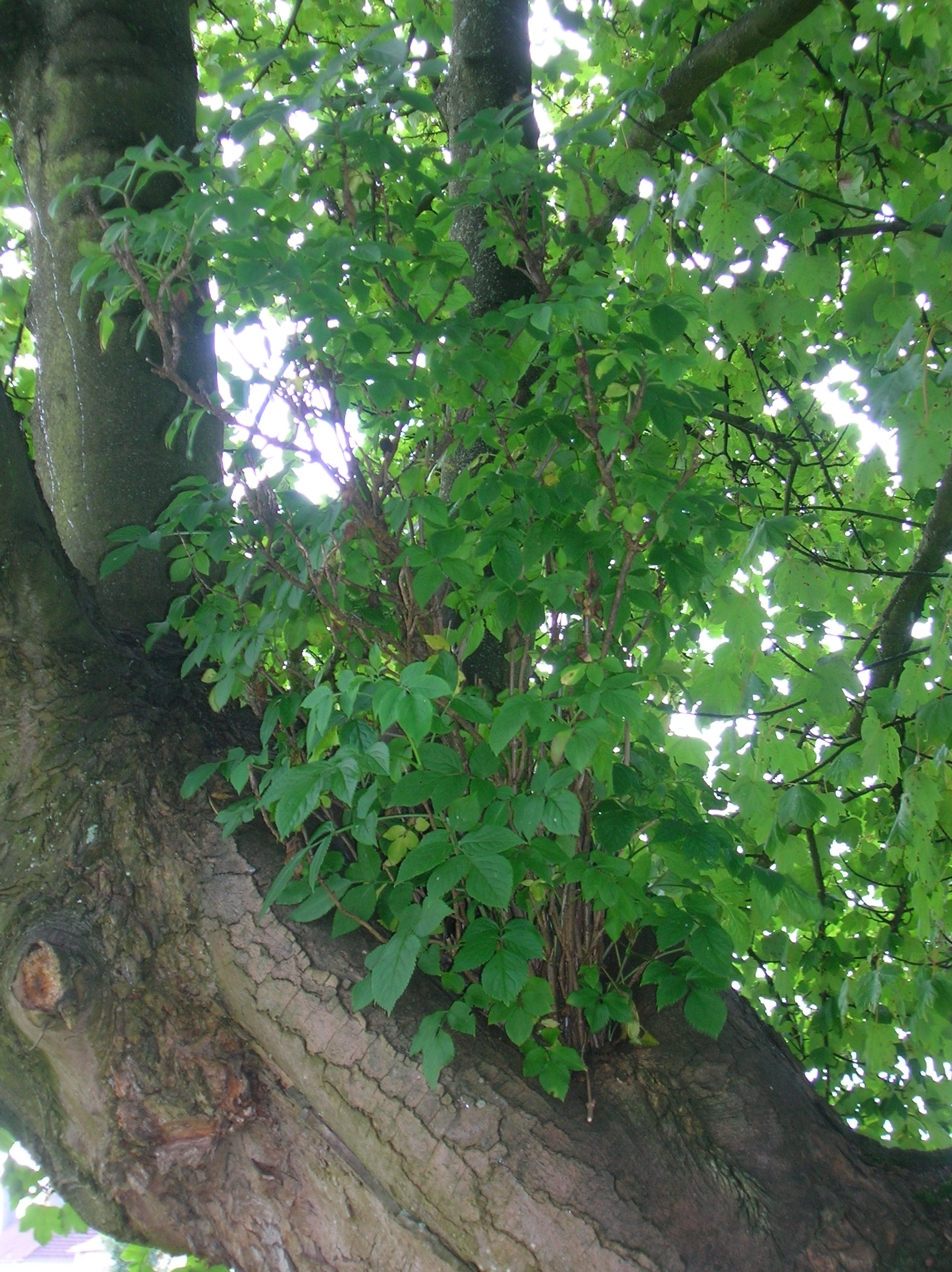
Growing as an epiphyte on a sycamore

Inflorescence

A tree with trunk visible

== Taxonomy ==
=== Subspecies ===
There are several other closely related species, native to Asia and North America, which were formerly treated as subspecies of Sambucus nigra, including Sambucus canadensis and Sambucus cerulea.

=== Etymology ===
The Latin specific epithet nigra means "black", and refers to the deeply dark colour of the berries. The English term for the tree is not believed to come from the word "old", but from either the Anglo Saxon ellaern, meaning hollow, or Anglo Saxon æld, meaning fire, because the hollow stems of the branches were used as bellows to blow air into a fire.

== Distribution and habitat ==
Sambucus nigra is native to Europe as far east as Turkey. It is native in, and common throughout, the British Isles. It has been introduced to parts of most other continents of the world.

S. nigra grows in a wide range of habitats, including woodland, grassland, hedgerows, scrub, river banks, roadsides, railway banks and waste ground. It is generally associated with open or disturbed, nutrient-rich sites, such as woodland edges, forest gaps, abandoned fields and urban areas; it is not tolerant of drought and avoids saline soils.

== Ecology ==
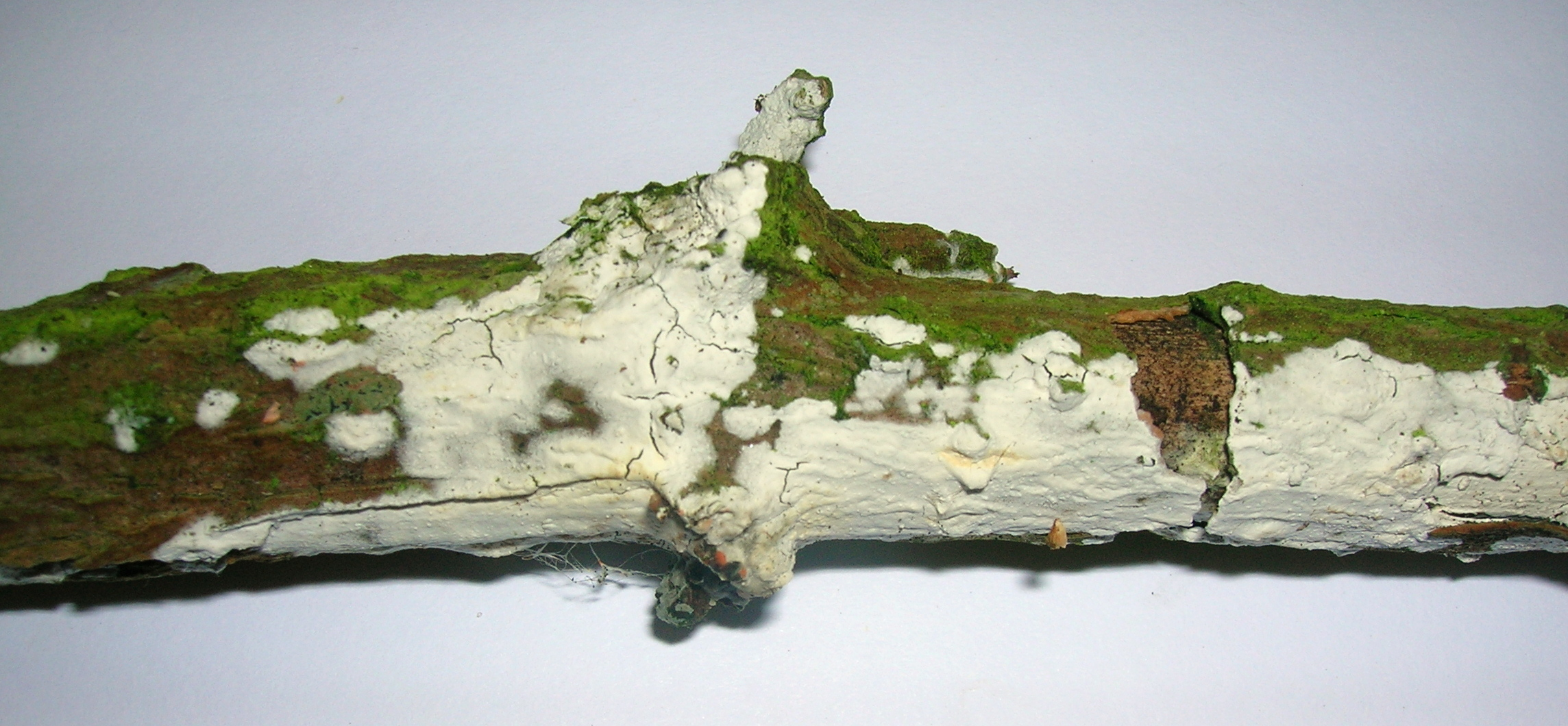
Elder whitewash fungus

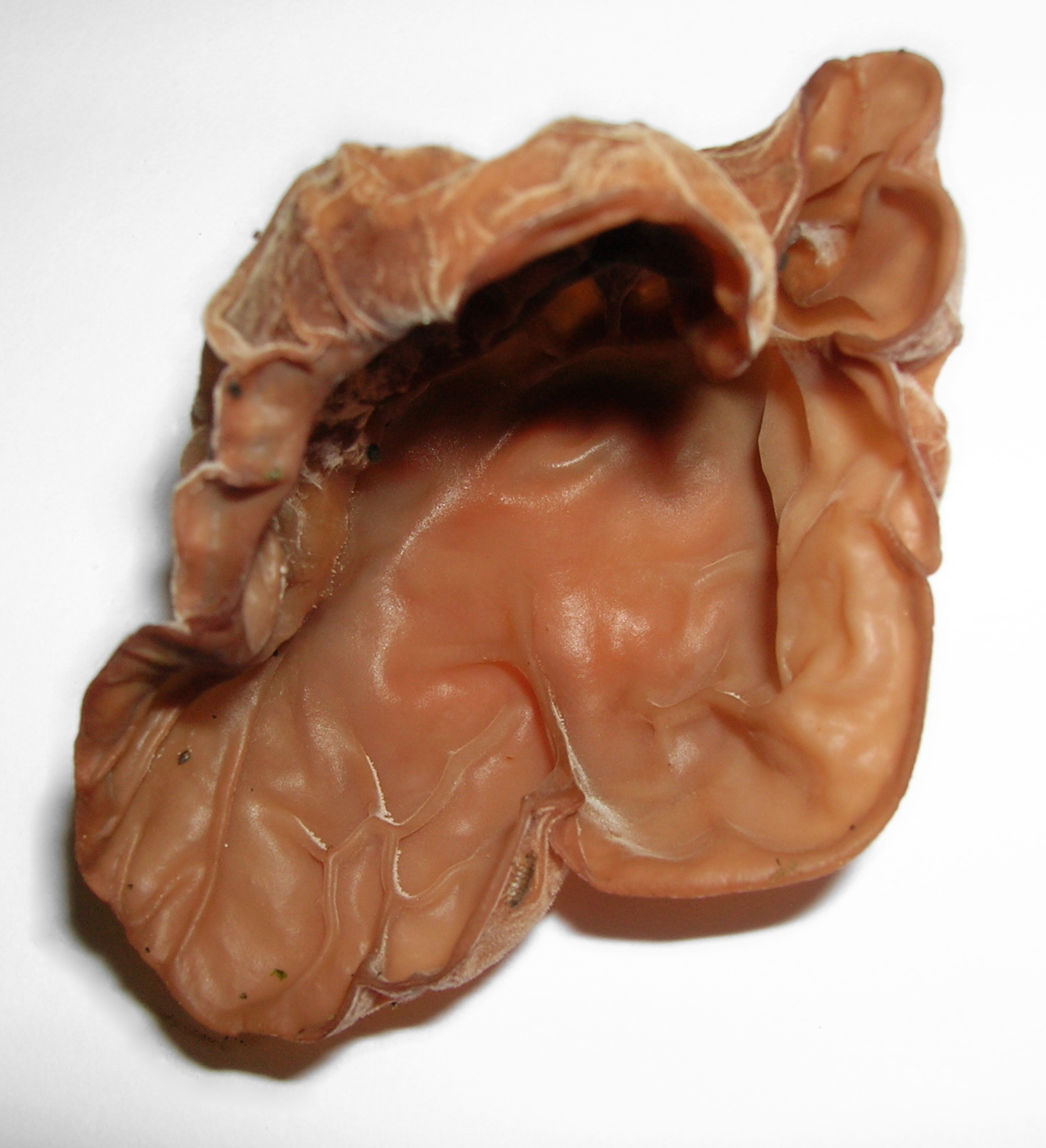
Jelly ear fungus

Like other elders, S. nigra is subject to elder whitewash fungus and jelly ear fungus. Strong-scented flowers in wild populations of S. nigra attract numerous, minute flower thrips which may contribute to the transfer of pollen between inflorescences.

Except for the flowers and ripe berries (but including the ripe seeds), all parts of the plant are poisonous to mammals, containing the cyanogenic glycoside sambunigrin (C_{14}H_{17}NO_{6}, CAS number 99–19–4).

=== Wildlife value ===
The soft, very juicy fruit are an important food for many birds, including several that are otherwise primarily insectivorous and rarely take other fruit. A total of 22 species were observed eating elderberries, with the most important for dispersing the seeds being blackbird, song thrush, European robin, blackcap, and common starling, while blue tit and common woodpigeon were significant as seed predators.

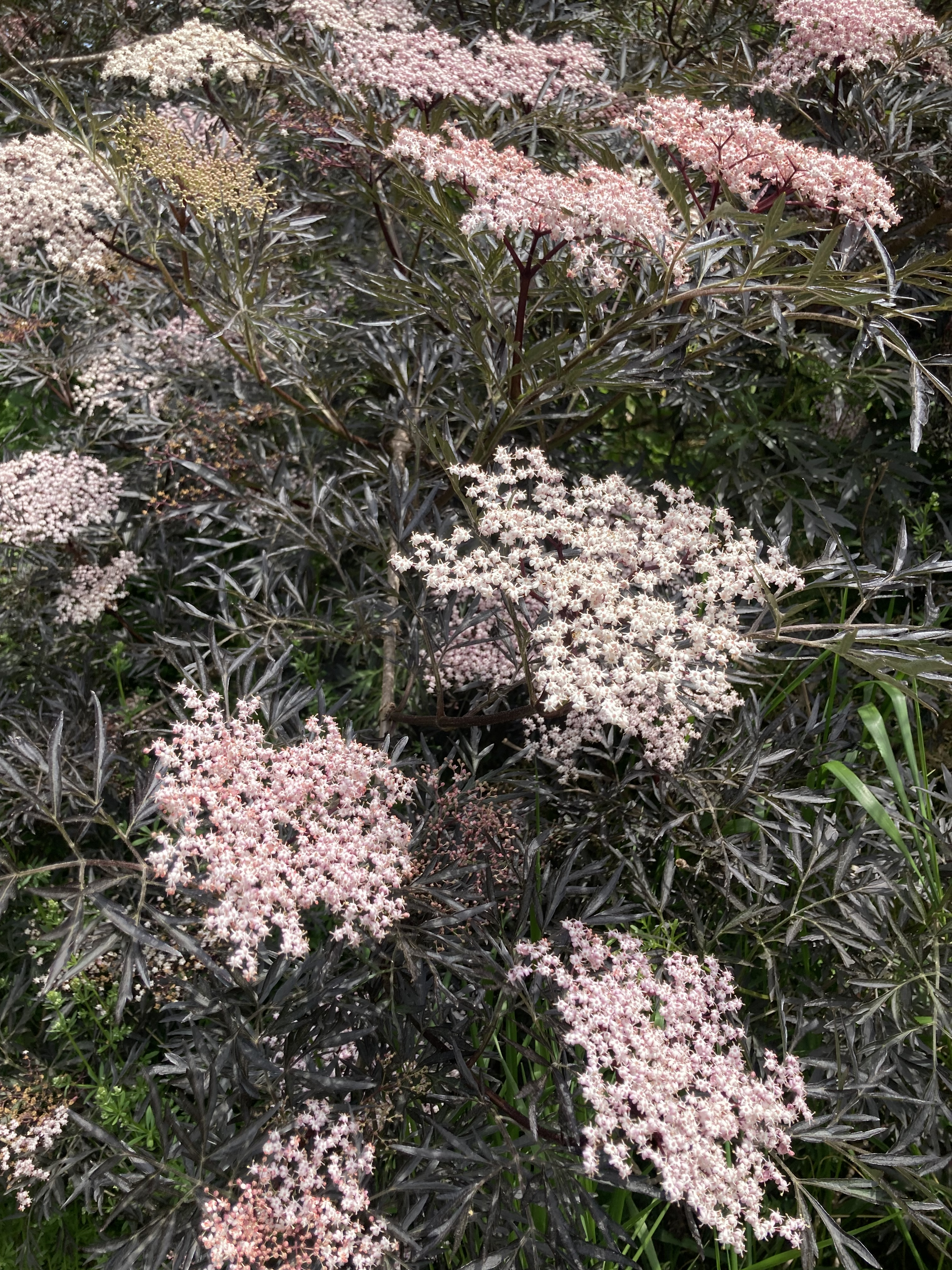
A purple, cut-leafed elder variety with pale pink flowers

== Toxicity ==
All green parts of the plant contain cyanogenic glycosides.

== Relationship to humans ==
=== Cultivation ===
S. nigra is grown as an ornamental shrub or small tree, especially in informal hedges, wildlife gardens and mixed borders. The species is also cultivated commercially for flowers and fruit. It is vigorous and adaptable, growing in sun or partial shade although it performs poorly in deep shade or dry conditions. It tolerates both wet and dry soils from sand to clay, but grows best on well-drained, organic-rich, slightly acidic soils, about pH 6.0–6.5. Plants for commercial plantations are usually propagated from own-rooted hardwood cuttings taken from one-year-old shoots. Propagation from seed is less common because seedlings are variable and the seeds have dormancy requirements. Weed control is important during establishment, as black elder competes poorly with other plants.

Some selections and cultivars have variegated or coloured leaves and other distinctive qualities, and are grown as ornamental plants. S. nigra f. porphyrophylla has dark maroon or black leaves, and pale pink flowers. Leaf colour in purple- or golden-leaved cultivars is usually strongest in full sun. Garden plants need little pruning, but established plants can be hard pruned in late winter or early spring to restrict size or encourage fresh ornamental foliage. In commercial orchards, dormant pruning is usually begun from the second year, removing dead, damaged or diseased wood and stems older than three years, as productivity declines on four-year-old branches. Annual coppicing to ground level is generally not recommended, since most commercial cultivars do not fruit on first-year canes.

The following cultivars have gained the Royal Horticultural Society's Award of Garden Merit:

- S. nigra f. laciniata (cut-leaved elder)
- S. nigra f. porphyrophylla 'Eva' ('Black Lace')
- S. nigra f. porphyrophylla 'Gerda'

=== Food and drink ===
The dark blue or purple berries are edible though with an insipid flavour when fully ripe, but are toxic when immature. They can also be used to make jam, jelly, and wine. In Scandinavia and Germany, soup made from the elderberry (e.g. the German Fliederbeersuppe) is a traditional meal.

Commonly, the flowerheads are used in infusions, giving a drink in Northern Europe and the Balkans. These drinks are sold commercially as elderflower cordial or elderflower pressé. In Europe, the flowers are made into a syrup or cordial (in Romanian: socată, in Swedish: fläder(blom)saft, in Danish: hyldeblomstsaft / hyldedrik), which is diluted with water before drinking. The popularity of this traditional drink recently has encouraged some commercial soft drink producers to introduce elderflower-flavoured drinks (Fanta Shokata, Freaky Fläder). The flowers also may be dipped into a light batter and then fried to make elderflower fritters.

The berries may be made into elderberry wine. In Hungary, an elderberry brandy is made that requires 50 kilograms of fruit to produce 1 litre of brandy. In southwestern Sweden, it is traditional to make a snaps liqueur flavoured with elderflower. Elderflowers are used in liqueurs such as St-Germain, and in a mildly alcoholic sparkling elderflower 'champagne', although a more alcoholic home-made version can be made.

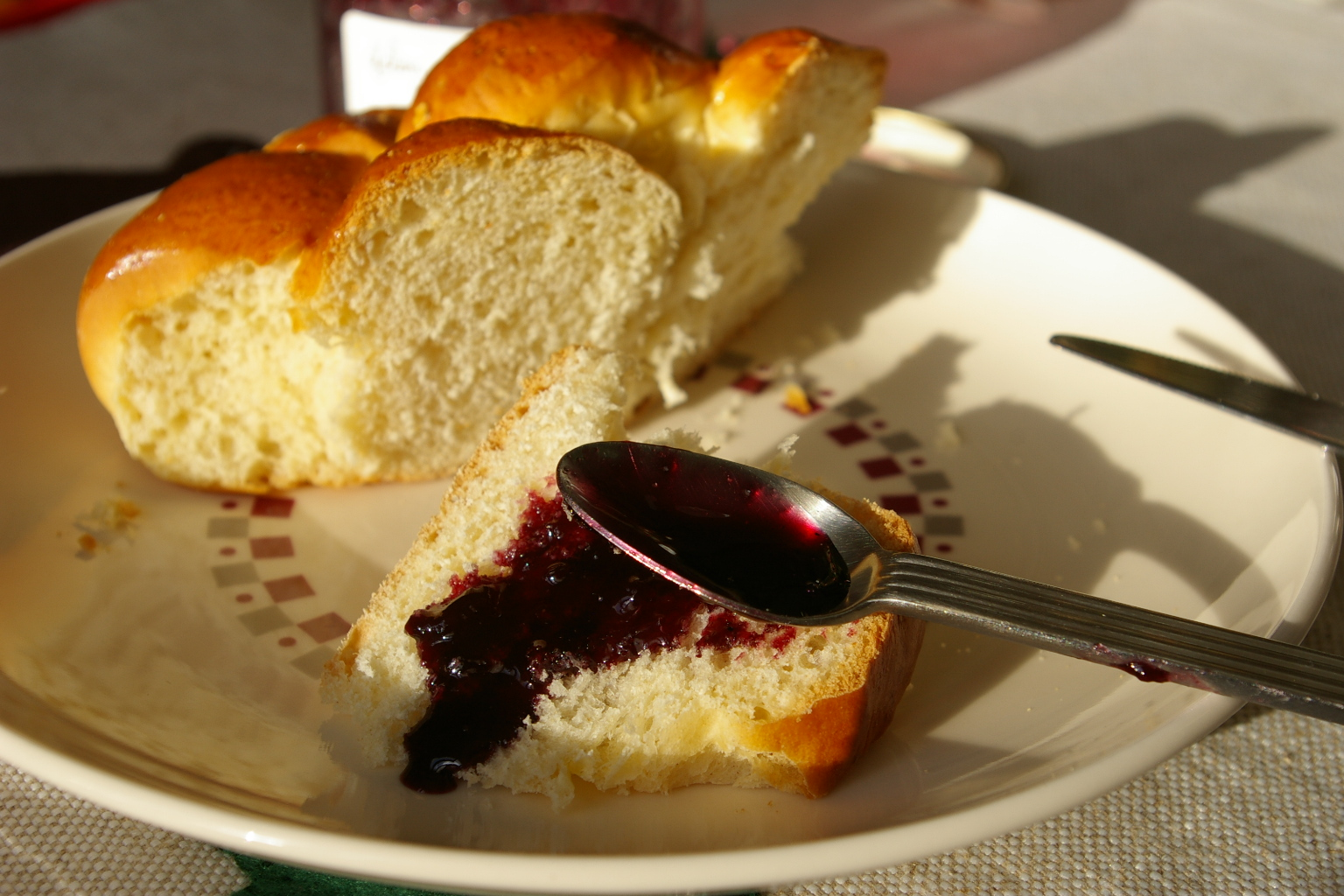
Elderberry jam

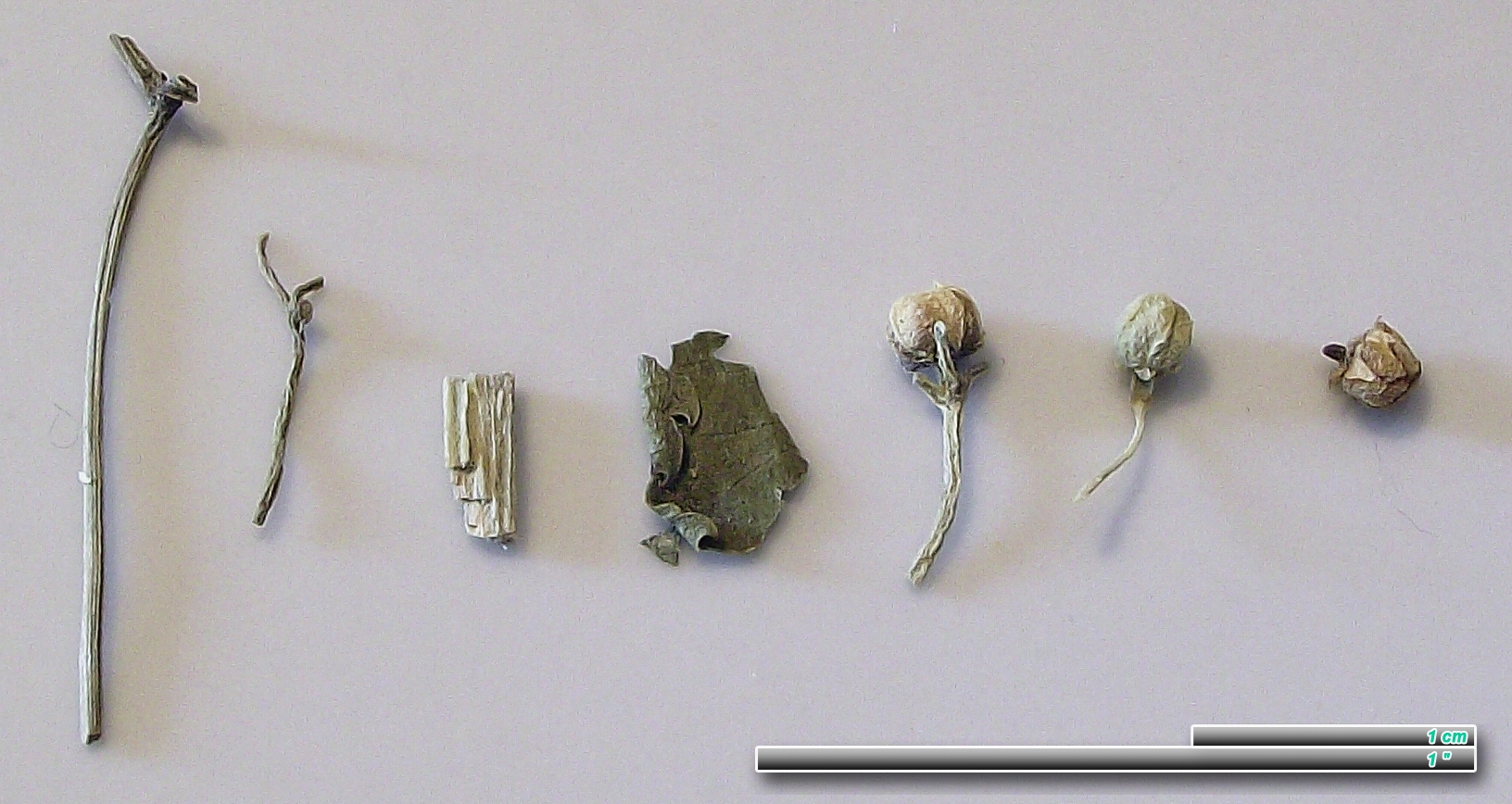
Sambuci flos: dried sambucus nigra flowers as used in herbal tea

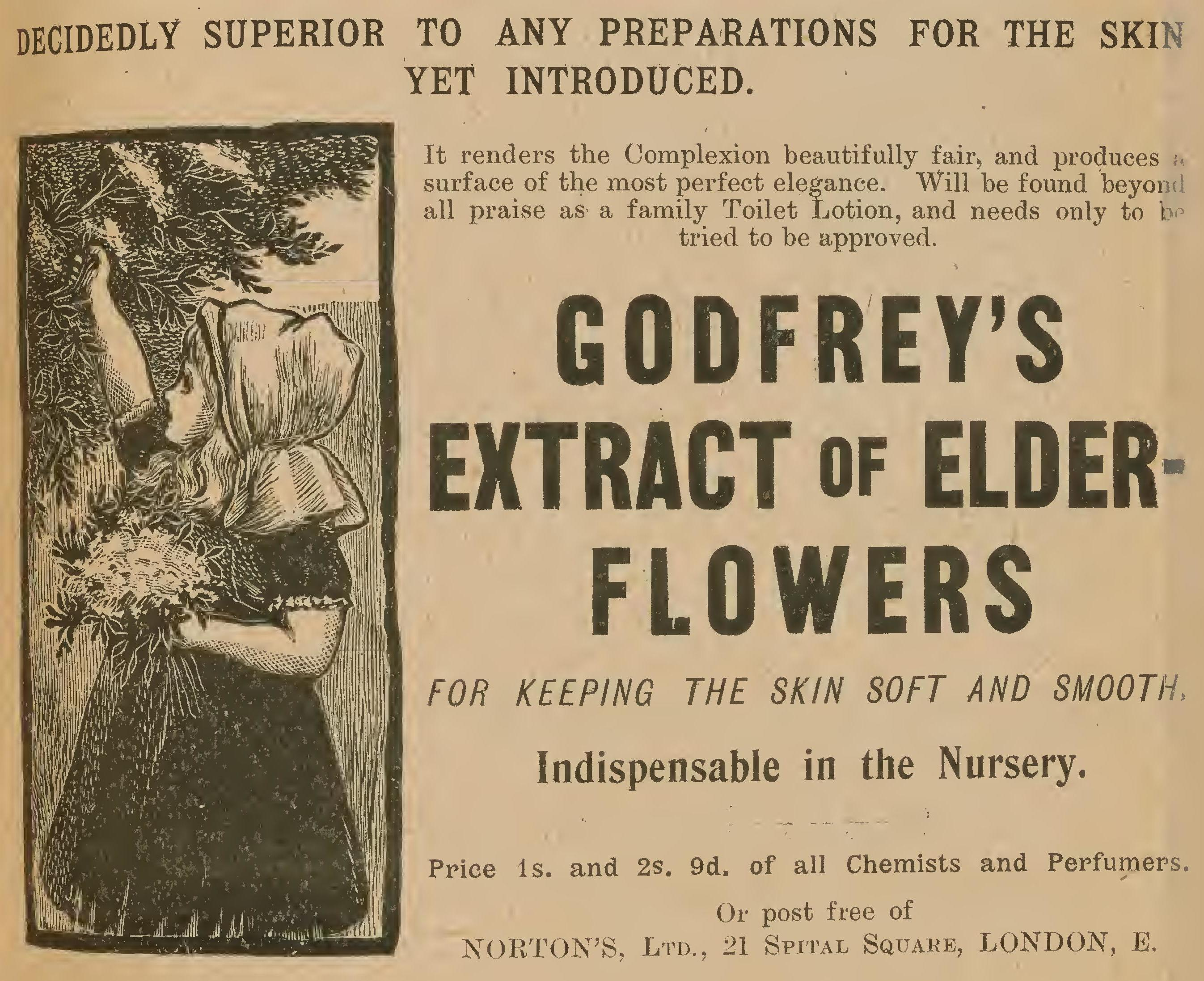
"Godfrey's Extract of Elder-Flowers" ad in 1900

=== Folklore ===
In early Scandinavian and English folklore, the tree was linked to a Goddess called the Elder Mother. Later, a myth that Judas Iscariot hung himself from the tree led to the name 'Judas Tree'. The fungus Auricularia auricula-judae, which commonly grows on the tree, is connected with the same myth, having the old common name 'Jew's ear'.

=== Traditional medicine ===
The European Union's Committee on Herbal Medicinal Products (HMPC) has established a monograph for Sambucus nigra flower. The current monograph recognises traditional use of Sambucus nigra for relief of early symptoms of the common cold. The HMPC states that "although there is insufficient evidence from clinical trials, the effectiveness of these herbal medicines is plausible and there is evidence that they have been used safely in this way for at least 30 years."
