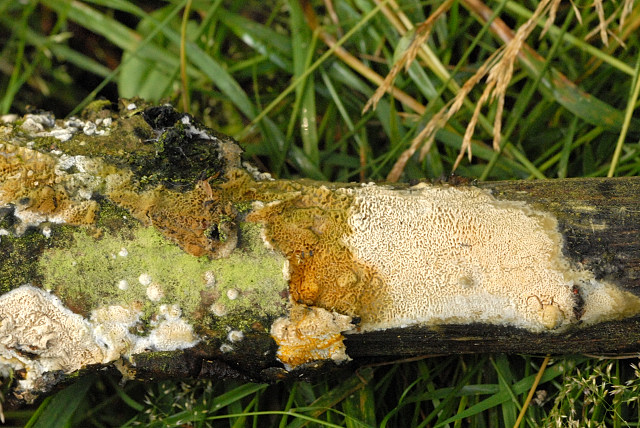
- Schizopora paradoxa, a species of the Schizoporaceae

Scientific classification
- Kingdom: Fungi
- Division: Basidiomycota
- Class: Agaricomycetes
- Order: Hymenochaetales
- Family: Schizoporaceae; Jülich (1982)

Genera
- 14, see text

= Schizoporaceae =

Family of fungi

Schizoporaceae are a family of fungi in the order Hymenochaetales. These are saprobic, and cause white rots of standing and fallen wood of coniferous and broadleaved trees. According to one 2008 estimate, the family contains 14 genera and 109 species.

== Genera ==
- Alutaceodontia
- Basidioradulum
- Echinodia
- Echinoporia
- Fibrodontia
- Lagarobasidium
- Leucophellinus
- Kneiffiella
- Odontiopsis
- Palifer
- Paratrichaptum
- Poriodontia
- Rogersella
- Schizopora
- Xylodon
