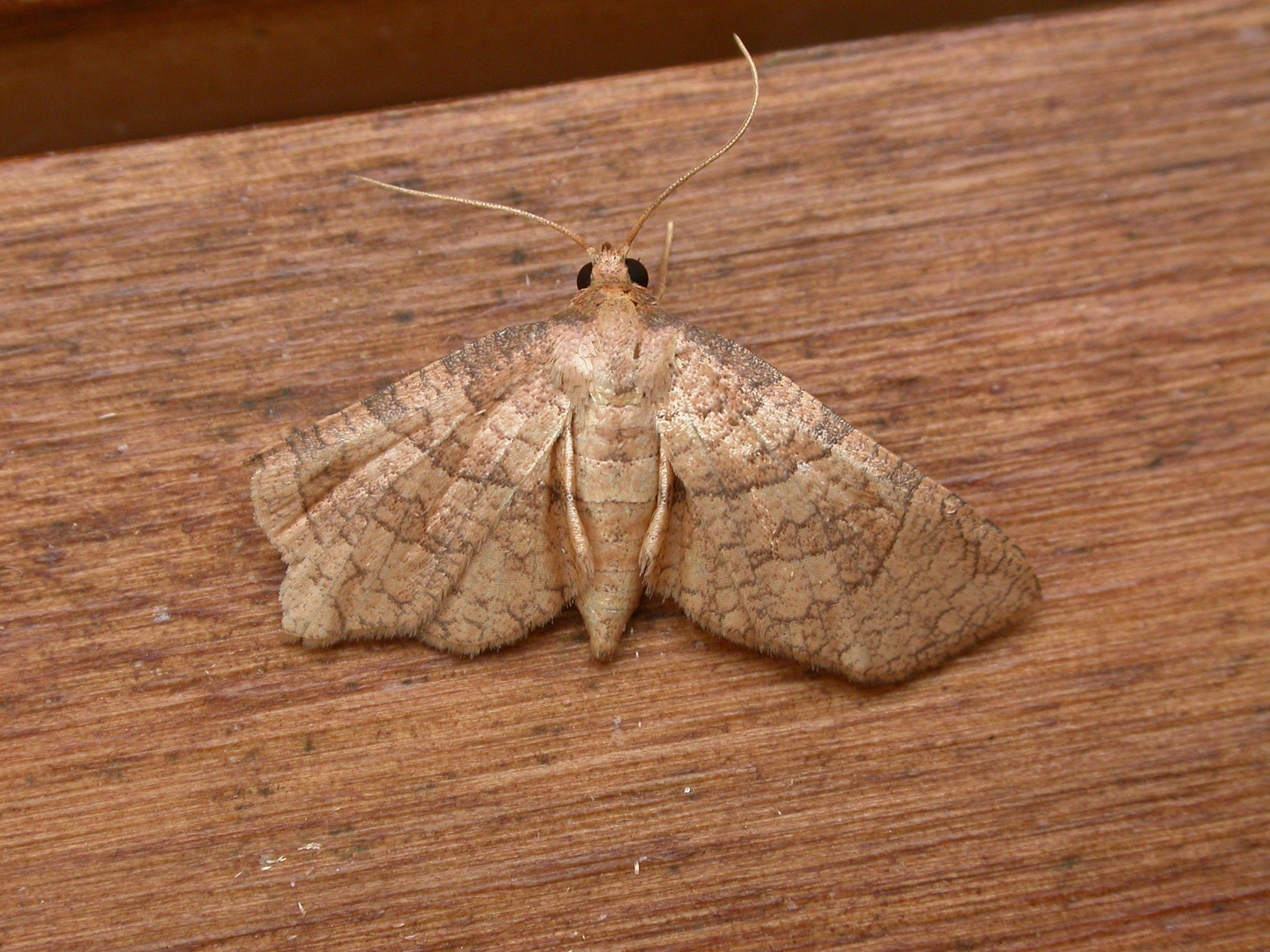
- Mellea ordinaria

Scientific classification
- Kingdom: Animalia
- Phylum: Arthropoda
- Class: Insecta
- Order: Lepidoptera
- Family: Thyrididae
- Genus: Mellea; Gaede, 1922

= Mellea =

Genus of moths

Mellea is a genus of moths of the family Thyrididae.

== Species ==
- Mellea angustifasciata (Gaede, 1922)
- Mellea ordinaria (Warren, 1896)
