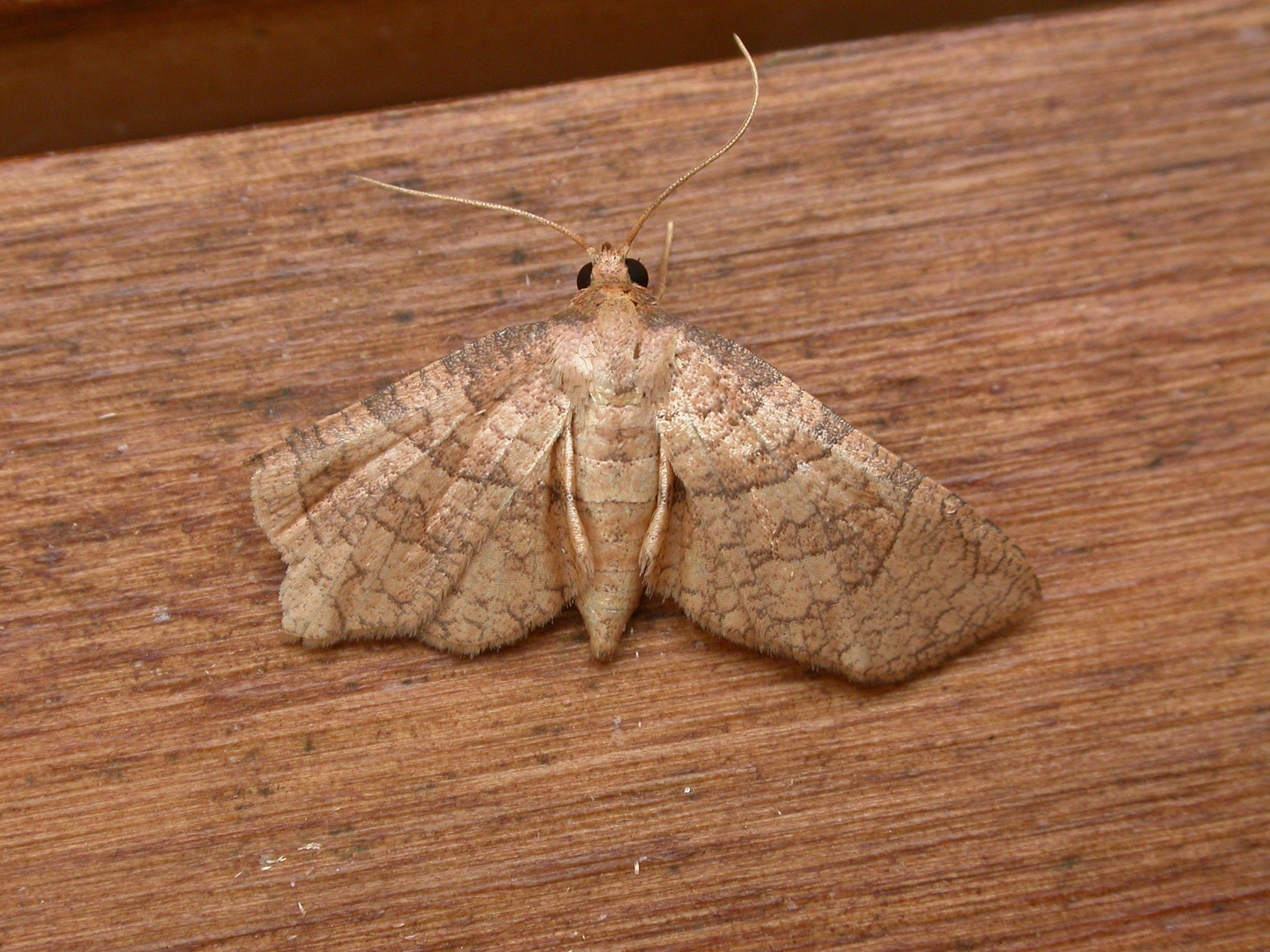

Scientific classification
- Kingdom: Animalia
- Phylum: Arthropoda
- Class: Insecta
- Order: Lepidoptera
- Family: Thyrididae
- Genus: Mellea
- Species: M. ordinaria

Binomial name
- Mellea ordinaria (Warren, 1896)

Synonyms
- Banisia ordinaria Warren, 1896; Banisia ordinaria nigristriata Warren, 1897; Banisia ordinaria hyphenata Warren, 1897

= Mellea ordinaria =

Species of moth

Mellea ordinaria is a species of moth of the family Thyrididae. It is found in Australia (including Queensland) and New Guinea.
