= Phylloporia boldo =

Scientific classification
- Kingdom: Fungi
- Division: Basidiomycota
- Class: Agaricomycetes
- Order: Hymenochaetales
- Family: Hymenochaetaceae
- Genus: Phylloporia
- Species: P. boldo

Binomial name
- Phylloporia boldo Rajchenb. & Pildain

Species of fungus

Phylloporia boldo
- Mycological characteristics
- Pores on hymenium
- Ecology is saprotrophic

Phylloporia boldo is a species of fungus in the family Hymenochaetaceae within the order Hymenochaetales, native to Chile.

== Taxonomy ==
The species was first described by Mario Rajchenberg and María Belén Pildain in 2019, based on specimens from Península de Hualpén Nature Sanctuary, Chile.

== Ecology ==
Phylloporia boldo is a saprotroph, growing on living stems of Peumus boldus.
