= Garnudden Nature Reserve =

Nature reserve in Stockholm, Sweden

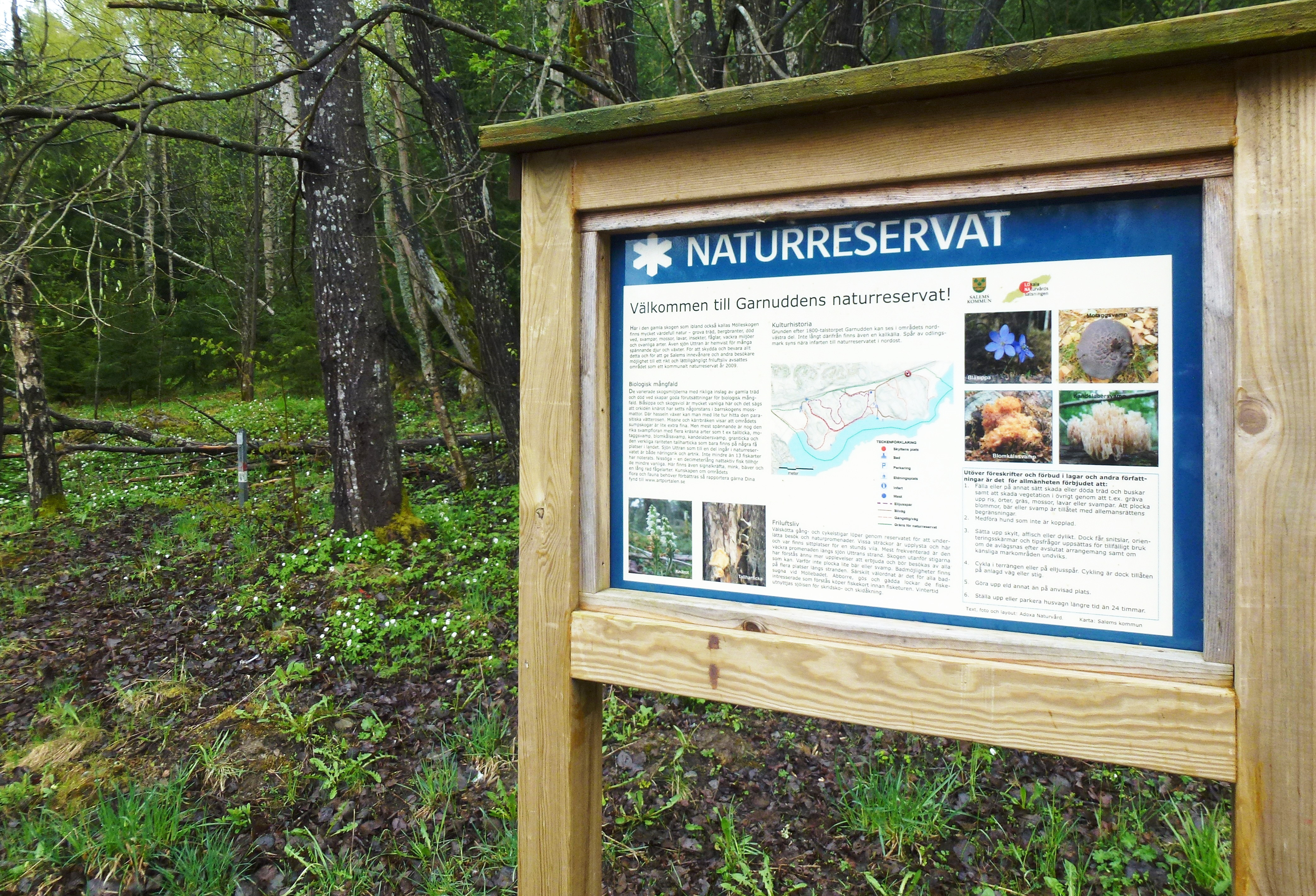

- Location within Stockholm
- Location: Sweden
- Nearest city: Stockholm
- Coordinates: 59°11′30″N 17°46′57″E
- Established: 2010

Garnudden Nature Reserve (Swedish: Garnuddens naturreservat) is a nature reserve in Salem Municipality, Stockholm County in Sweden.

The purpose of the nature reserve is to protect the natural values of the area for the future, as it is located close to an urban environment, as well as an effort to sustain the biodiversity of the area. The area is topographically varied and is typical for forest areas on Södertörn. Several protected species are known from the area, including Phellinus pini and Cortinarius sulfurinus.

The area is accessible to visitors via footpaths. A beach for bathing also lies within the reserve and is supervised by Salem Municipality.
