= Tropicoporus tropicalis =

Species of fungus

External image
- Fig. A – D on page 17 of Lima et al. (2022)'s paper on MNHN's website.

Tropicoporus tropicalis

Scientific classification
- Kingdom: Fungi
- Division: Basidiomycota
- Class: Agaricomycetes
- Order: Hymenochaetales
- Family: Hymenochaetaceae
- Genus: Tropicoporus
- Species: T. tropicalis

Binomial name
- Tropicoporus tropicalis (M.J. Larsen & Lombard) L.W. Zhou & Y.C. Dai (2015)

Synonyms
- Poria rickii Bres. (1920); Phellinus rickii (Bres.) A. David & Rajchenb. (1985); Phellinus tropicalis M.J. Larsen & Lombard (1988); Inonotus tropicalis (M.J. Larsen & Lombard) T. Wagner & M. Fisch. (2002)

Tropicoporus tropicalis is a mushroom of the family Hymenochaetaceae. Tropicoporus tropicalis is a wood-decaying basidiomycetes that rarely causes disease in animals and human, and is commonly found in humid climate such as Brazil. In its natural environment, the fungus is associated with white rot woody angiosperms, and has its annual fruiting body on tree trunks and branches. Tropicoporus tropicalis has two kinds of hyphae (a dimitic hyphal system), generative and skeletal, that lack clamp connections.

== Taxonomy ==
Poria rickii is a species described by Giacomo Bresadola in 1920. Alix David and Mario Rajchenberg renamed it Phellinus rickii in 1985.

However, there already is a pre-existing name Phellinus rickii Teixeira 1950. To avoid confusion, Larsen and Lombard (1988) gave David and Rajchenberg's P. rickii a new name Phellinus tropicalis.

Wagner and Fischer (2002) showed that Phellinus tropicalis belong in Inonotus sensu stricto after phylogenetic analysis of the fungus's rDNA nuclear LSU sequence, and renamed it Inonotus tropicalis.

In Zhou et al. (2015), Inonotus sensu lato (equivalent to Inonotus sensu stricto in Wagner and Fischer 2002) contains at least three clades (A, B, and C). Clade A is Inonotus sensu stricto, and clade B and C together form the Inonotus linteus complex. Clade B and C each was given names Tropicoporus and Sanghuangporus. The fungus, belonging to clade B, is renamed Tropicoporus tropicalis in the same time.

== Description ==
Tropicoporus tropicalis is a fungus with the growth characteristics of being appressed, short-downy, homogeneous, adherent, even margins, indistinct, and odourless. It is also woolly and yellowish-orange colonies, with annual fruiting bodies and dimitic hyphal system, which refers to the appearance of two kinds of hyphae: generative (2.5 – 4 ɥm in diameter, thin-walled, simple-septate, and pale yellowish brown), and skeletal (3.5 – 4.5 ɥm in diameter, thick-walled, infrequently simple-septate, and dull yellowish brown). Moreover, the fungus lacks setal hyphae and clamp connections in its hyphae, which is either thin or thick walled. However, it has numerous reddish brown Hymenial setae that has a maximum length of 25 ɥm, and has dull brown pores that becomes whiter near the margin. The Basidiocarp of Tropicoporus tropicalis is annual, resupinate, and hyaline. The abundant fungal spores are coloured yellowish to ochraceous, and shaped ovoid to broadly ellipsoid and smooth when mature. Both the spores (7 - 9 per mm) and the basidiospores are small, with basidiospores having more than 3.5 um wide when it is ellipsoid, and are less than 3.5 um wide when it is sub-globose.

== Physiology ==
The fungus grows:

- Moderately rapid in MEA (Malt Extract Agar)
- In 0.05% cycloheximide

The mat diameter of the fungus depends on temperature, but the optimal growth temperature is around 36 °C, and the maximum temperature without growth (not killed) is 44 °C. Even though all parts of the fungus could be darkened by 2% KOH, only the hyphae can be stained by phloxine, a reddish dye. Furthermore, Tropicoporus tropicalis is also found to be highly resistant to caspofungin and posaconazole, two different anti-fungal compounds.

== Ecology and habitat ==
Tropicoporus tropicalis is a poroid wood-decaying basidiomycete that is usually associated with white rot woody angiosperms, grow on deciduous wood, and have fruiting body on infected tree trunks and branches. It is mainly found in the tropical zone and humid climate, such as Brazil; but is present in Mississippi, Florida, Georgia, Jamaica, Guadeloupe, Costa Rica, Colombia, East Africa, and Malaya, Johore, and Mawaii Malaysia.

== As a pathogen ==
Tropicoporus tropicalis rarely causes diseases in animals and human. However, it is an opportunistic pathogen that has the potential to induce allergic and invasive diseases in mammals.

=== Animal ===
The fungus has been recorded to cause fungal pericardial effusion and myocarditis in a French bulldog, that was under immunosuppressive therapy (species was non-pigmented, and has indication of a hyalohyphomycosis infection); and induced a granulomatous mediastinal mass in an immunocompromised Irish Wolfhound dog.

=== Human ===
The first association of an invasive infection on human occurred on a patient with chronic granulomatous disease. In addition, two similar chronic granulomatous disease cases of I. tropicalis infection were later found in immunodeficient children and adults that had caused osteomyelitis.

In 2021, the first case of Tropicoporus tropicalis infection on a immunocompetent human was reported.
