= Onnia =

Onnia may refer to:

- Onnia (fungus), a genus of fungi in the family Hymenochaetaceae
- Onnia (trilobite), a genus of trilobite in the family Trinucleidae from the late Ordovician of Africa, Europe, North America and South America
