= Phylloporia =

Phylloporia may refer to:

- Phylloporia (fungus), a genus of polypore fungus in the family Hymenochaetaceae
- Phylloporia (moth), a genus of moth in the family Incurvariidae
