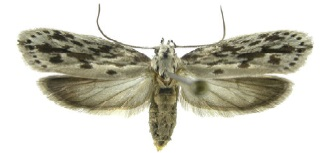

Scientific classification
- Kingdom: Animalia
- Phylum: Arthropoda
- Class: Insecta
- Order: Lepidoptera
- Family: Depressariidae
- Genus: Ethmia
- Species: E. catapeltica

Binomial name
- Ethmia catapeltica Meyrick, 1924

= Ethmia catapeltica =

Species of moth

Ethmia catapeltica is a moth in the family Depressariidae. It is widespread in Central and northern South America, from southern Mexico (Córdoba, Veracruz) to Bolivia.

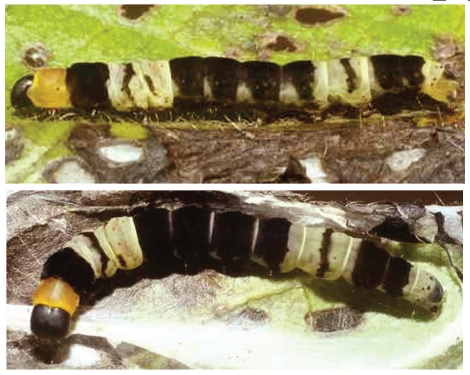
Larva

The length of the forewings is 8.6–13 mm (0.34–0.51 in). The ground color of the forewings is whitish, with dark brownish gray markings, variable from an almost complete replacement of ground color to a rather distinct pattern. The ground color of the hindwings is semitranslucent white, but pale brownish at the margins. Adults are on wing in April, May, October and December (Barro Colorado Island in Panama), February, March and October (in Costa Rica) and July (in Mexico). There are probably multiple generations per year.

The larvae feed on Cordia alliodora.
