= Phellinidium =

Scientific classification
- Kingdom: Fungi
- Division: Basidiomycota
- Class: Agaricomycetes
- Order: Hymenochaetales
- Family: Hymenochaetaceae
- Genus: Phellinidium (Kotlába) Fiasson & Niemelä (1984)

Type species
- Phellinidium ferrugineofuscum (P.Karst.) Fiasson & Niemelä (1984)

Species
- P. ferrugineofuscum P. pouzarii P. sulphurascens

Synonyms
- Phellinus subgen. Phellinidium Kotlába (1968)

Genus of fungi

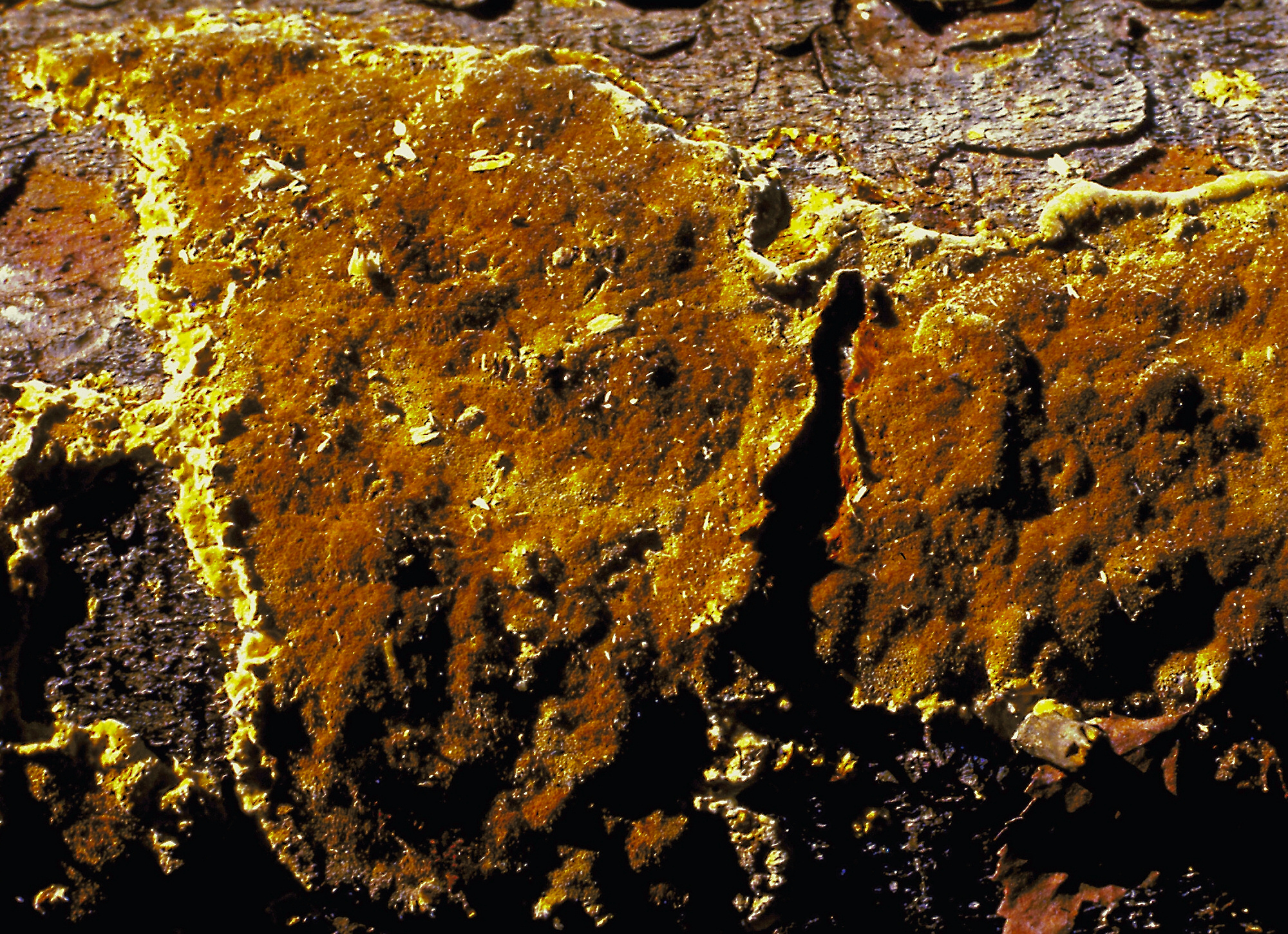
It is of the same species

Phellinidium is a genus of fungi in the family Hymenochaetaceae. The genus, circumscribed in 1984, contains three species found in Europe.
