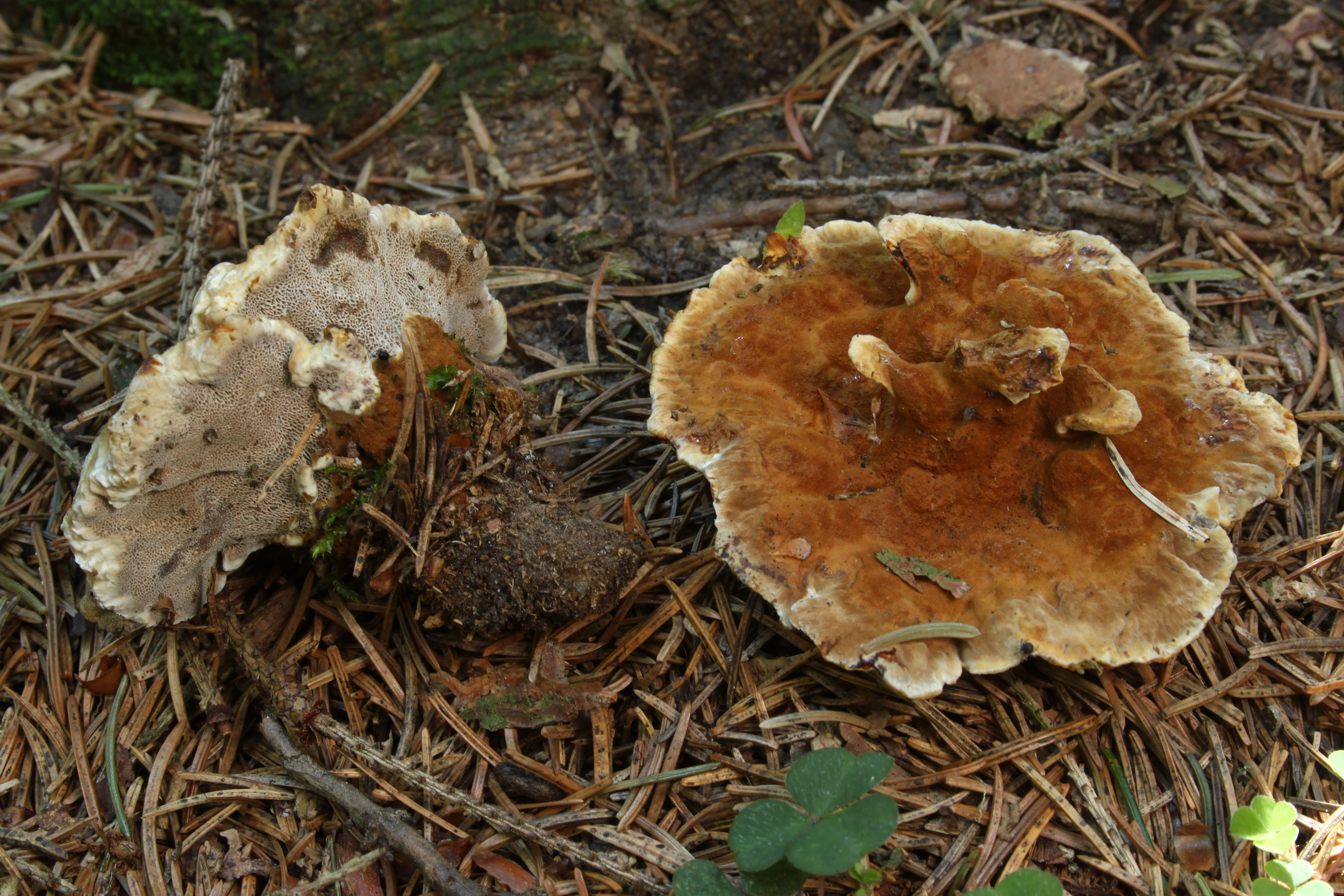

Scientific classification
- Kingdom: Fungi
- Division: Basidiomycota
- Class: Agaricomycetes
- Order: Hymenochaetales
- Family: Hymenochaetaceae
- Genus: Onnia
- Species: O. tomentosa

Binomial name
- Onnia tomentosa (Fr.) P.Karst. (1889)

Synonyms
- Polyporus tomentosus Fr. (1821)

= Onnia tomentosa =

Species of fungus

Onnia tomentosa
- Mycological characteristics
- Pores on hymenium
- Cap is convex or depressed
- Hymenium is decurrent
- Stipe is bare
- Edibility is unknown

Onnia tomentosa is a species of fungus in the family Hymenochaetaceae commonly known as the woolly velvet polypore. It is a plant pathogen, causing root rot especially in spruce trees.

== Taxonomy ==
It was formerly known as Inonotus tomentosum (Fr.) Teng until molecular phylogenetic analysis led to major revisions in the classification of the Hymenochaetaceae.

== Description ==
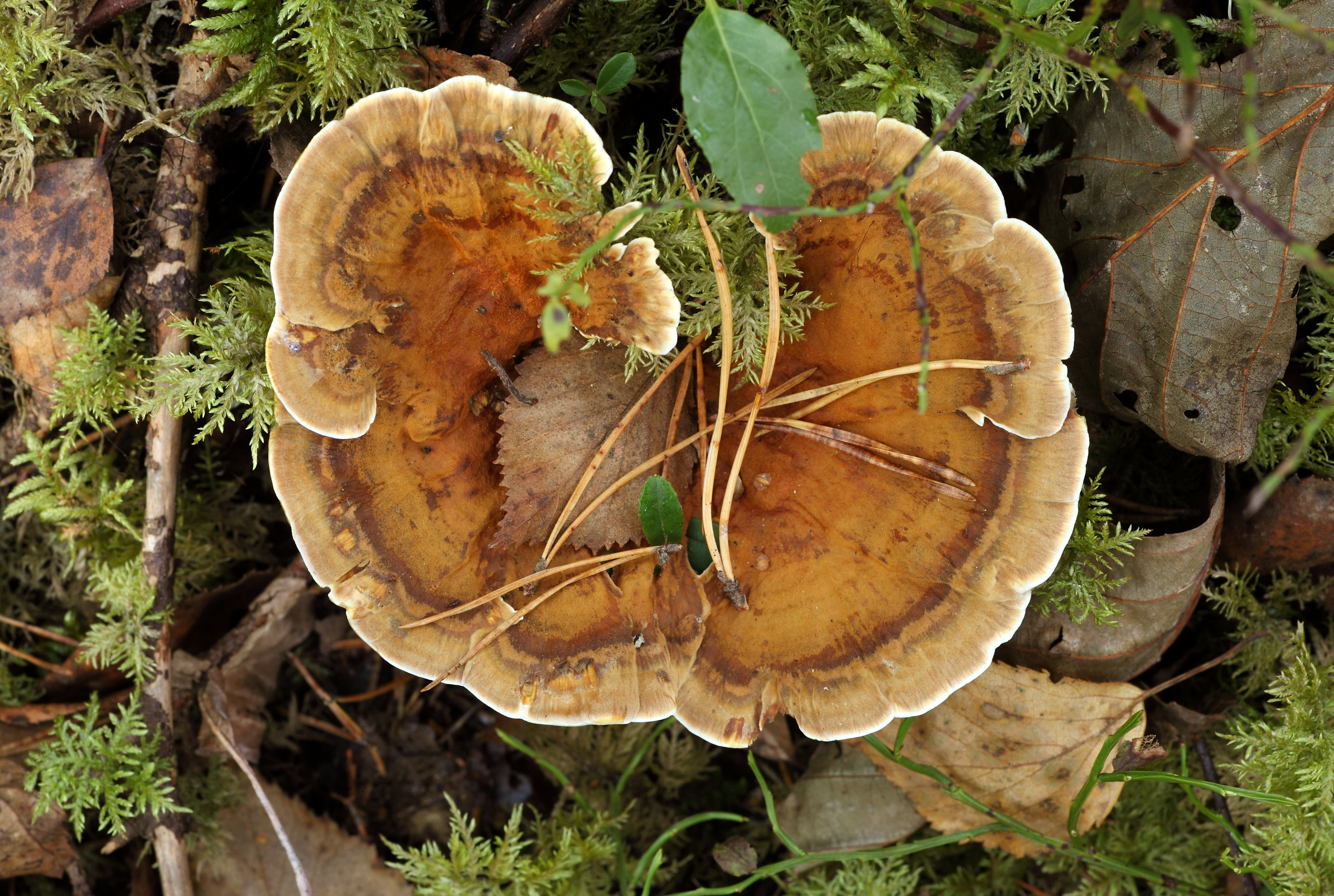
Onnia tomentosa, Albu Parish, Estonia

The cap is flat when young, with a blunt, rounded and yellowish-white margin, later with a slightly depressed centre and contoured in a wave pattern towards the rim, which has a rather sharp edge when old. It is covered in felt that is grey when young and rusty brown when old, up to 10 cm (3 7/8 in) in diameter. The stem, if present, is short and thick, and dark brown to near-black; the caps may also grow directly on the base of a tree. The flesh is ochre brown under the cap surface, softer above, and hard and fibrous below. The species is inedible.

=== Similar species ===
Coltricia perennis is similar, but has a weakly circularly zoned, bare cap. The flesh of the cap is stained uniformly. Other species of Coltricia and Phaeolus are also similar.

== Habitat and ecology ==
It is frequently found in coniferous forests at higher altitudes, often growing in large groups, rather rare at lower altitudes. It is a plant pathogen, and causes tomentosus root rot, primarily in spruce.

Most commercially important conifers in Canada, including white spruce, are attacked by I. tomentosus (Fr.) Teng also known as Onnia tomentosa. This fungus produces a white pocket rot commonly called Tomentosus root rot in both roots and butts of naturally seeded or planted conifers. White spruce and black spruce were found to be the two most susceptible species in an inoculation test in Saskatchewan, and high losses to root rot, in large part due to I. tomentosus, affected white spruce plantations at Grand-Mère QC. In white spruce plantations, mortality in groups of two or three trees usually occurs at about the age of 30–35 years, but younger trees can also be killed. Occasional trees as young as 10 years of age are infected. Seventeen white spruce plantations 43–58 years old in Ontario incurred an average of 0.7% mortality annually over a 6-year study period. Average accumulated mortality of dominant and codominant trees was 10.3% for all plantations in that study. Tomentosus root rot was found in more than half the stumps after clearcutting in a plantation at Searchmont, Ontario, but decay and stain had not yet reached stump height.
