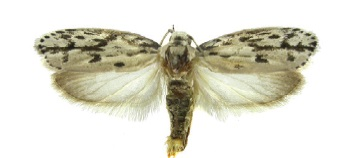

Scientific classification
- Domain: Eukaryota
- Kingdom: Animalia
- Phylum: Arthropoda
- Class: Insecta
- Order: Lepidoptera
- Family: Depressariidae
- Genus: Ethmia
- Species: E. petersterlingi

Binomial name
- Ethmia petersterlingi Phillips, 2014

= Ethmia petersterlingi =

Species of moth

Ethmia petersterlingi is a moth in the family Depressariidae. It is found in Costa Rica, where it has been recorded from both sides of the Cordillera Volcánica de Guanacaste at altitudes between 180 and 790 meters (590 and 2,590 ft). The habitat consists of rain forests.

The length of the forewings is 9–9.4 mm (0.35–0.37 in) for males and 9.3–9.5 mm (0.37–0.37 in) for females. The ground color of the forewings is whitish with blackish markings and one distinct spot at the base. There is an oblique, thin dark mark from before the mid-costa connecting with a longitudinal blotch from the middle to the termen. The hindwing ground colour is whitish, but darker at the margins.

The larvae feed on Cordia alliodora.

== Etymology ==
The species is named in honor of Peter Sterling, professor emeritus of the University of Pennsylvania and resident of Panamá, for his coaching and encouragement of the early days of Área de Conservación Guanacaste growth, and for his support of the blossoming of school children biodiversity education in Panamá.
