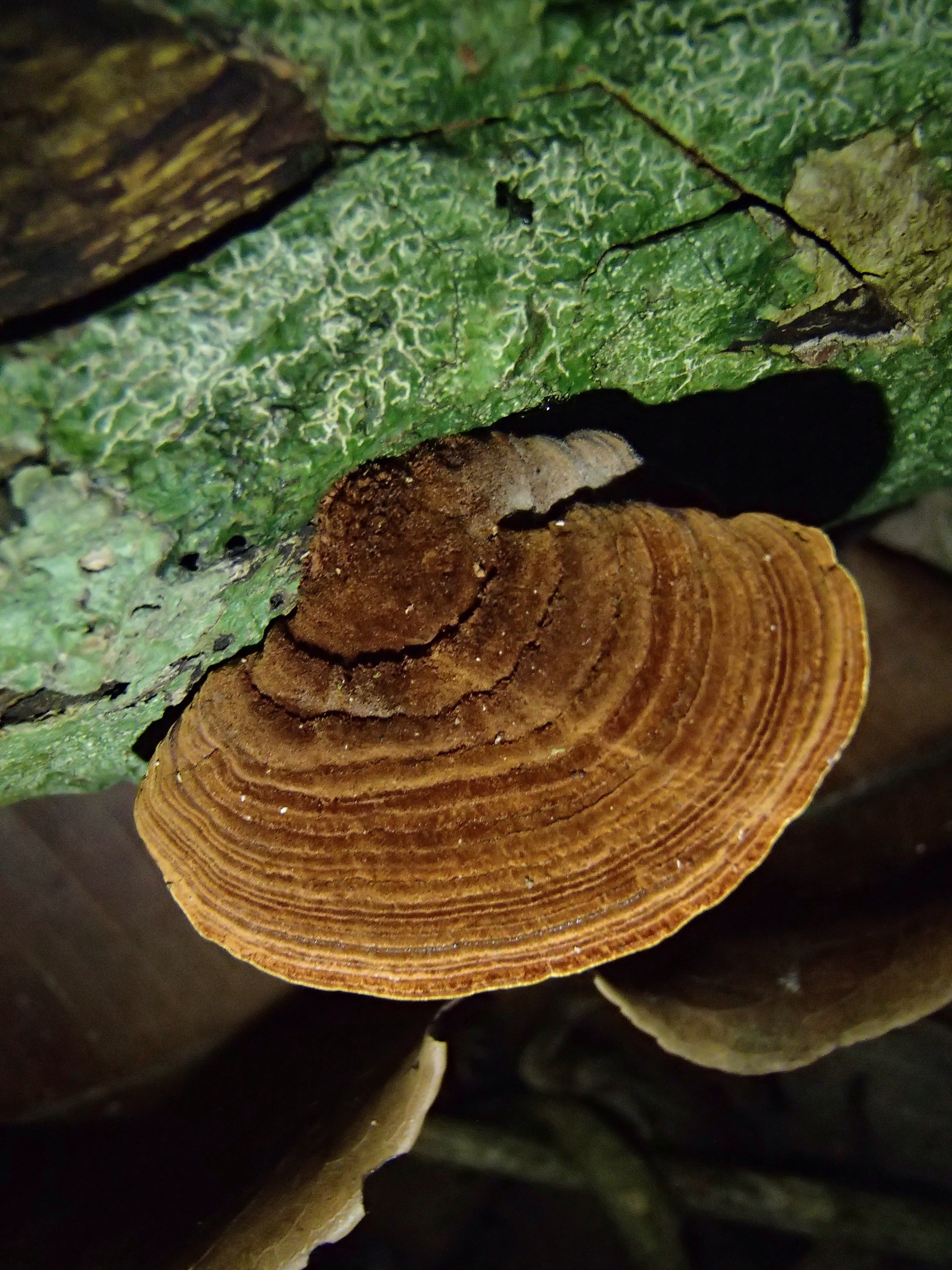
- Cyclomyces iodinus from Peru

Scientific classification
- Kingdom: Fungi
- Division: Basidiomycota
- Class: Agaricomycetes
- Order: Hymenochaetales
- Family: Hymenochaetaceae
- Genus: Cyclomyces; Kunze ex Fr.

Type species
- Cyclomyces fuscus Kunze ex Fr. (1830)

= Cyclomyces =

Genus of fungi

Cyclomyces is a genus of fungi in the family Hymenochaetaceae. It has been suggested that the genus be merged with Hymenochaete.

== Species list ==
- Cyclomyces albida
- Cyclomyces beccarianus
- Cyclomyces bresadolae
- Cyclomyces cichoriaceus
- Cyclomyces fuscus
- Cyclomyces gigase
- Cyclomyces greeniie
- Cyclomyces iodinus
- Cyclomyces lamellatus
- Cyclomyces leveillei
- Cyclomyces maderensis
- Cyclomyces setiporus
- Cyclomyces stereoides
- Cyclomyces yuennanensis
