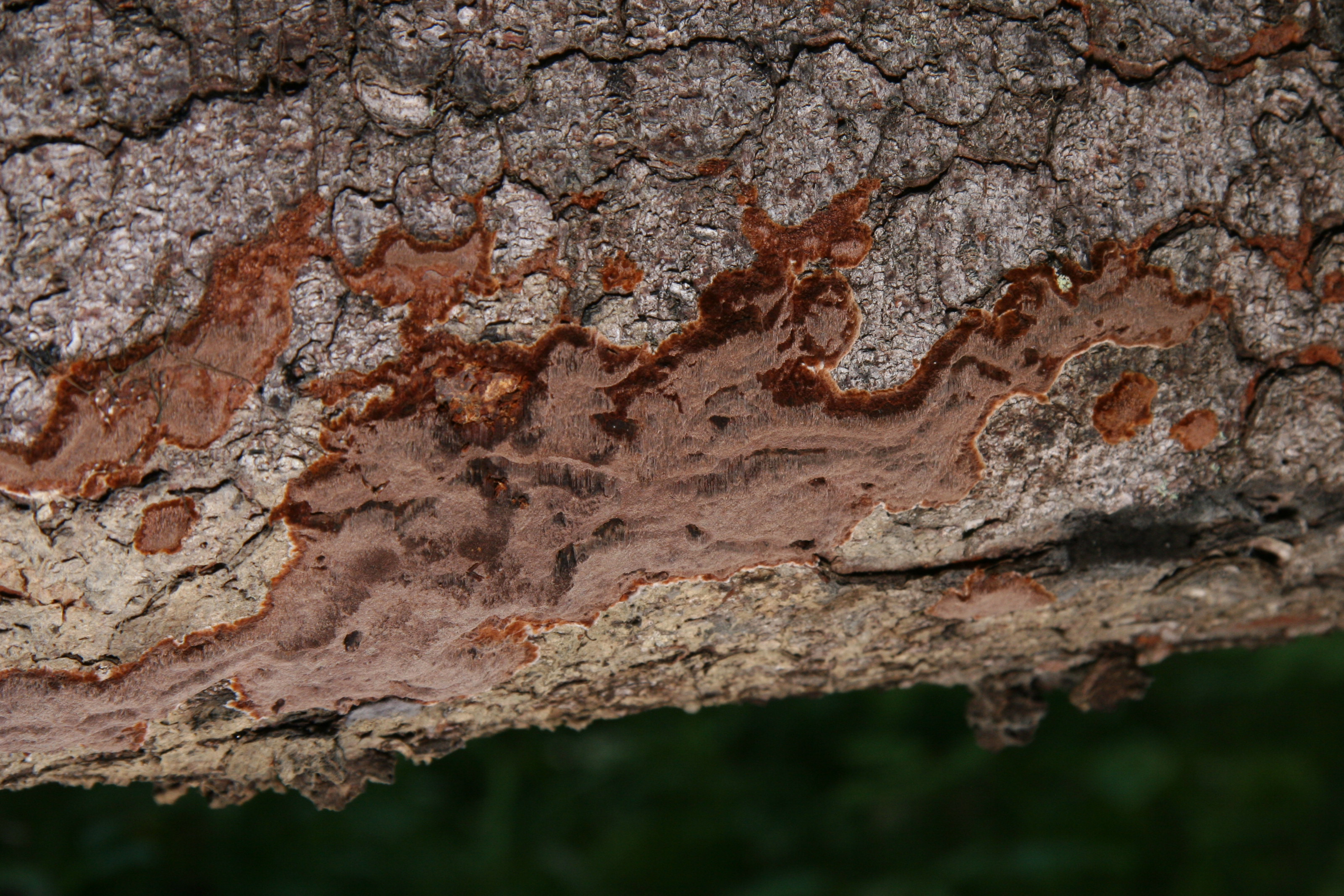

Scientific classification
- Domain: Eukaryota
- Kingdom: Fungi
- Division: Basidiomycota
- Class: Agaricomycetes
- Order: Hymenochaetales
- Family: Hymenochaetaceae
- Genus: Phellinidium
- Species: P. ferrugineofuscum

Binomial name
- Phellinidium ferrugineofuscum (P.Karst.) Fiasson & Niemelä, 1984

Synonyms
- Phellinus ferrugineofuscus (P.Karst.) Bourdot & Galzin

= Phellinidium ferrugineofuscum =

Species of fungus

Phellinidium ferrugineofuscum is a species of fungus belonging to the family Hymenochaetaceae. It has been found growing on Abies sibirica.

It is native to Eurasia and Northern America.
