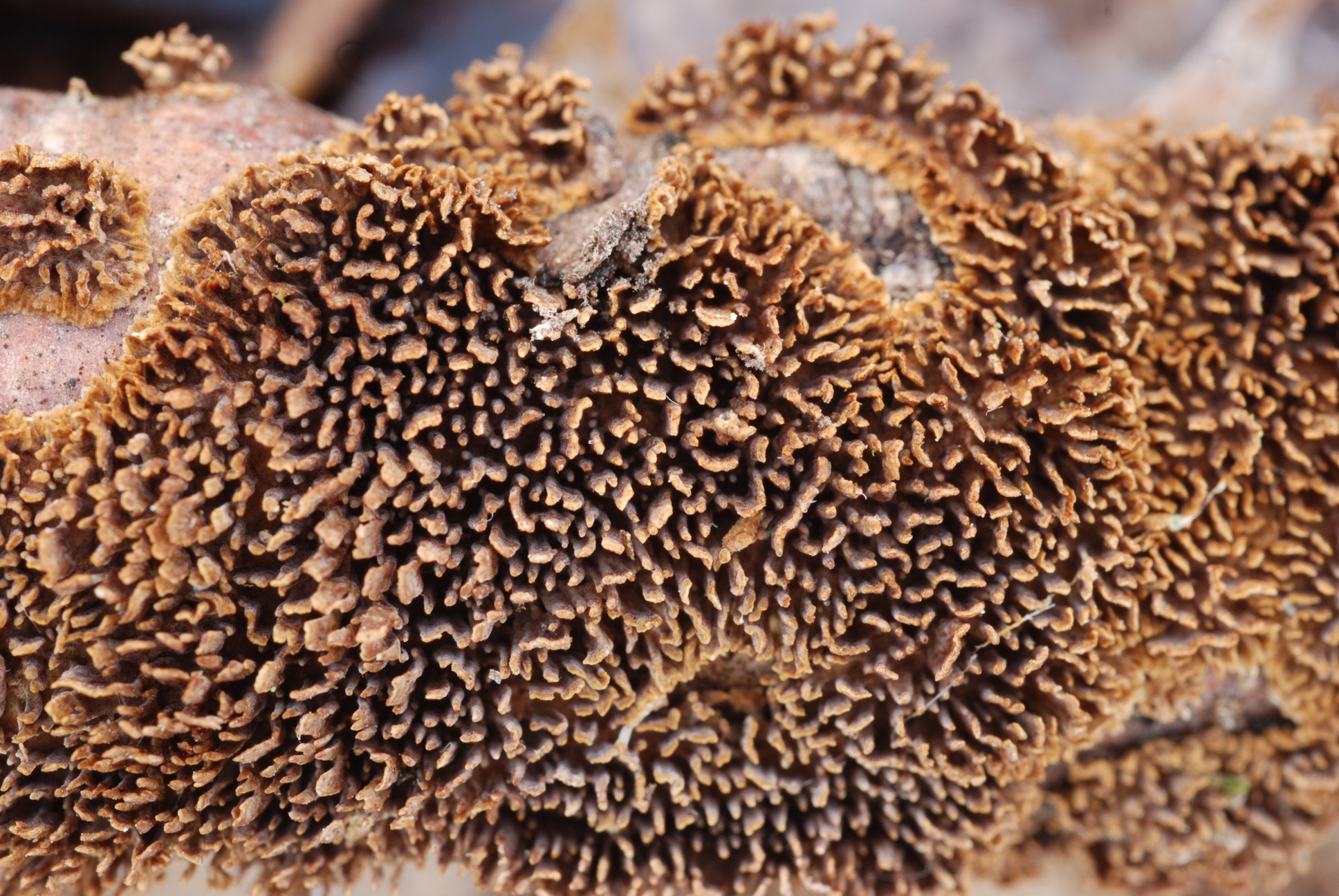
- Hydnochaete olivacea

Scientific classification
- Kingdom: Fungi
- Division: Basidiomycota
- Class: Agaricomycetes
- Order: Hymenochaetales
- Family: Hymenochaetaceae
- Genus: Hydnochaete; Bres. (1896)

= Hydnochaete =

Genus of fungi

Hydnochaete is a genus of hydnoid fungi in the family Hymenochaetaceae, order Hymenochaetales. All species are wood-rotting and produce brown to gray effused fruiting bodies. The genus is very close to Hymenochaete and can be considered its hydnoid counterpart.

== Species list ==
- Hydnochaete cinnamomea
- Hydnochaete duportii
- Hydnochaete japonica
- Hydnochaete olivacea
- Hydnochaete paucisetigera
- Hydnochaete peroxydataae
- Hydnochaete resupinata
- Hydnochaete saepiaria
- Hydnochaete setigera
- Hydnochaete tabacinoides
- Hydnochaete tuberculosa
