= Hymenochaete microcycla =

Scientific classification
- Domain: Eukaryota
- Kingdom: Fungi
- Division: Basidiomycota
- Class: Agaricomycetes
- Order: Hymenochaetales
- Family: Hymenochaetaceae
- Genus: Hymenochaete
- Species: H. microcycla

Binomial name
- Hymenochaete microcycla (Zipp. ex Lév.) Spirin & Miettinen

Species of fungus

Hymenochaete microcycla is a species of fungus in the genus Hymenochaete.
