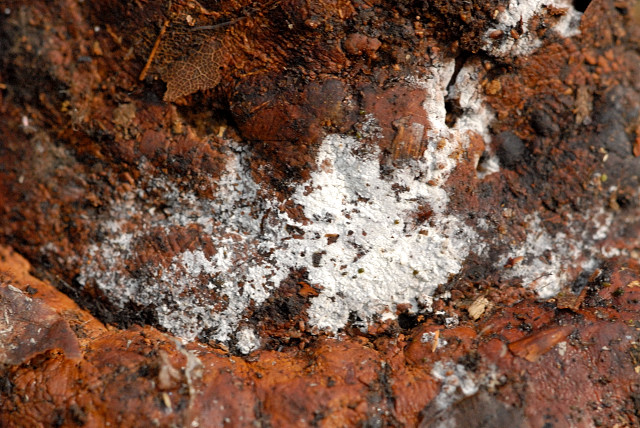
- Tubulicrinis borealis

Scientific classification
- Kingdom: Fungi
- Division: Basidiomycota
- Class: Agaricomycetes
- Order: Hymenochaetales
- Family: Hymenochaetaceae
- Genus: Tubulicrinis; Donk (1956)

Type species
- Tubulicrinis glebulosus (Fr.) Donk (1956)

= Tubulicrinis =

Genus of fungi

Tubulicrinis is a genus of crust fungi in the family Hymenochaetaceae. The genus was circumscribed by Dutch mycologist Marinus Anton Donk in 1956.

== Species ==
- Tubulicrinis accedens
- Tubulicrinis angustus
- Tubulicrinis borealis
- Tubulicrinis callosus
- Tubulicrinis chaetophorus
- Tubulicrinis cinctoides
- Tubulicrinis cinctus
- Tubulicrinis confusus
- Tubulicrinis corneri
- Tubulicrinis corticioides
- Tubulicrinis ellipsoideus
- Tubulicrinis evenii
- Tubulicrinis glebulosus
- Tubulicrinis globisporus
- Tubulicrinis gloeocystidiatus
- Tubulicrinis hamatus
- Tubulicrinis hirtellus
- Tubulicrinis incrassatus
- Tubulicrinis inornatus
- Tubulicrinis medius
- Tubulicrinis meruensis
- Tubulicrinis ovalisporus
- Tubulicrinis propinquus
- Tubulicrinis pseudoborealis
- Tubulicrinis regificus
- Tubulicrinis sceptrifer
- Tubulicrinis sororius
- Tubulicrinis strangulatus
- Tubulicrinis subulatus
- Tubulicrinis thermometrus
- Tubulicrinis umbraculus
