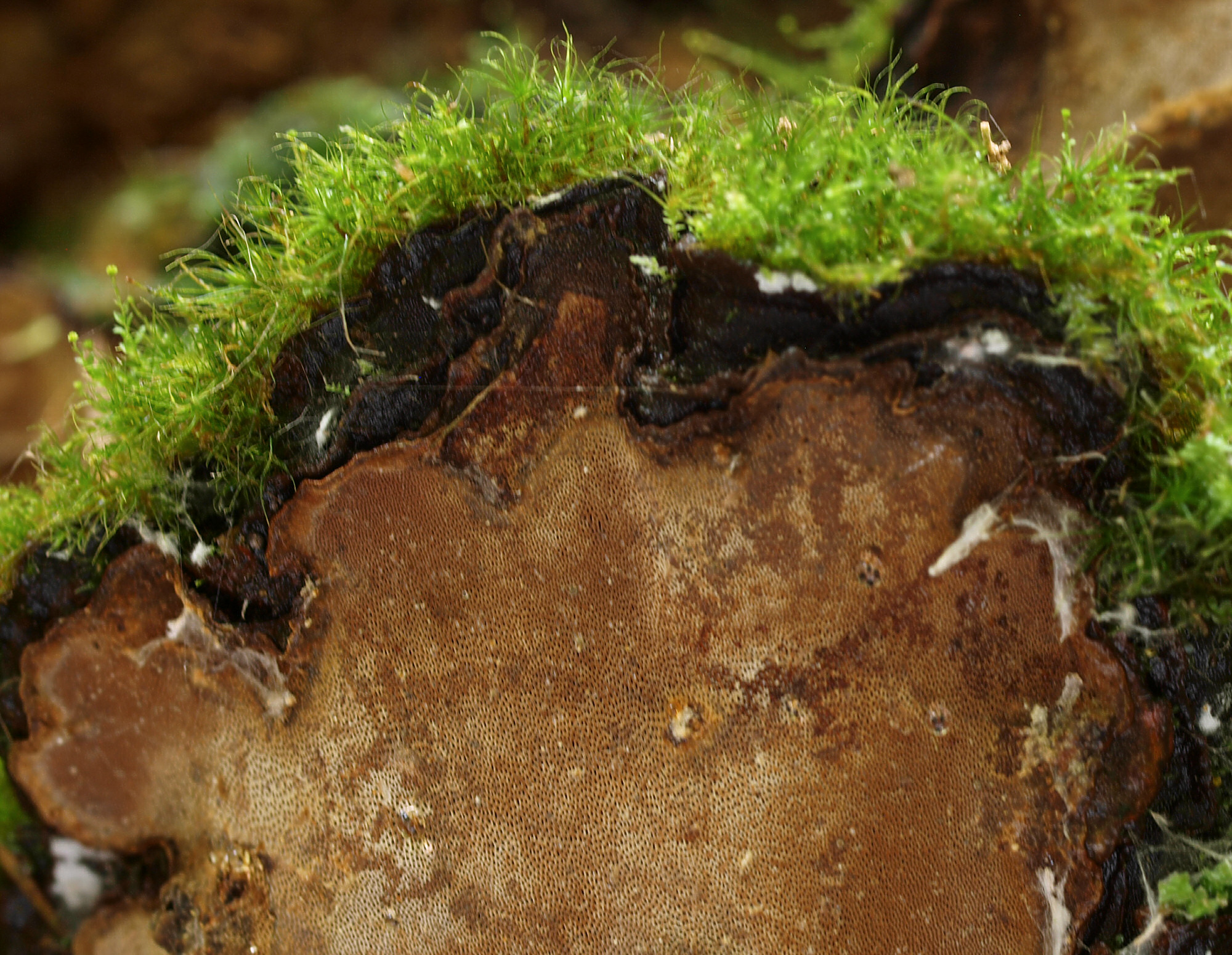

Scientific classification
- Kingdom: Fungi
- Division: Basidiomycota
- Class: Agaricomycetes
- Order: Hymenochaetales
- Family: Hymenochaetaceae
- Genus: Phellopilus; Niemelä, T.Wagner & M.Fisch. (2001)

Type species
- Phellopilus nigrolimitatus (Romell) Niemelä, T.Wagner & M.Fisch. (2001)

= Phellopilus =

Genus of fungi

Phellopilus is a fungal genus in the family Hymenochaetaceae. Circumscribed in 2001, the genus is monotypic, containing the single widespread species Phellopilus nigrolimitatus.
