= Botryodontia millavensis =

Scientific classification
- Domain: Eukaryota
- Kingdom: Fungi
- Division: Basidiomycota
- Class: Agaricomycetes
- Order: Polyporales
- Family: Phanerochaetaceae
- Genus: Botryodontia
- Species: B. millavensis

Binomial name
- Botryodontia millavensis (Bourdot & Galzin) Duhem & H. Michel, 2006

Synonyms
- Oxyporus philadelphi

Species of fungus

Botryodontia millavensis is a species of fungus belonging to the family Phanerochaetaceae.

It is native to Northern Europe.
