= Aurificaria =

Scientific classification
- Domain: Eukaryota
- Kingdom: Fungi
- Division: Basidiomycota
- Class: Agaricomycetes
- Order: Hymenochaetales
- Family: Hymenochaetaceae
- Genus: Aurificaria; D.A. Reid (1963)

Type species
- Aurificaria indica (Massee) D.A. Reid (1963)

Genus of fungi

Aurificaria is a genus of fungi in the family Hymenochaetaceae. The type species, Aurificaria indica, is currently the only species in this genus.
