= Pyrrhoderma =

Scientific classification
- Kingdom: Fungi
- Division: Basidiomycota
- Class: Agaricomycetes
- Order: Hymenochaetales
- Family: Hymenochaetaceae
- Genus: Pyrrhoderma; Imazeki (1966)

Type species
- Pyrrhoderma sendaiense (Yasuda) Imazeki (1966)

Synonyms
- Pyrrhoderma Imazeki (1955)

Genus of fungi

Pyrrhoderma is a genus of fungi in the family Hymenochaetaceae.

== Species ==
The following species are recognised in the genus Pyrrhoderma:

- Pyrrhoderma hainanense L.W. Zhou & Y.C. Dai (2018)
- Pyrrhoderma lamaoense (Murrill) L.W. Zhou & Y.C. Dai (2018)
- Pyrrhoderma noxium (Corner) L.W. Zhou & Y.C. Dai (2018)
- Pyrrhoderma sendaiense (Yasuda) Imazeki (1966) - found in Japan.
- Pyrrhoderma thailandicum L.W. Zhou & Y.C. Dai (2018)
- Pyrrhoderma yunnanense L.W. Zhou & Y.C. Dai (2018)
