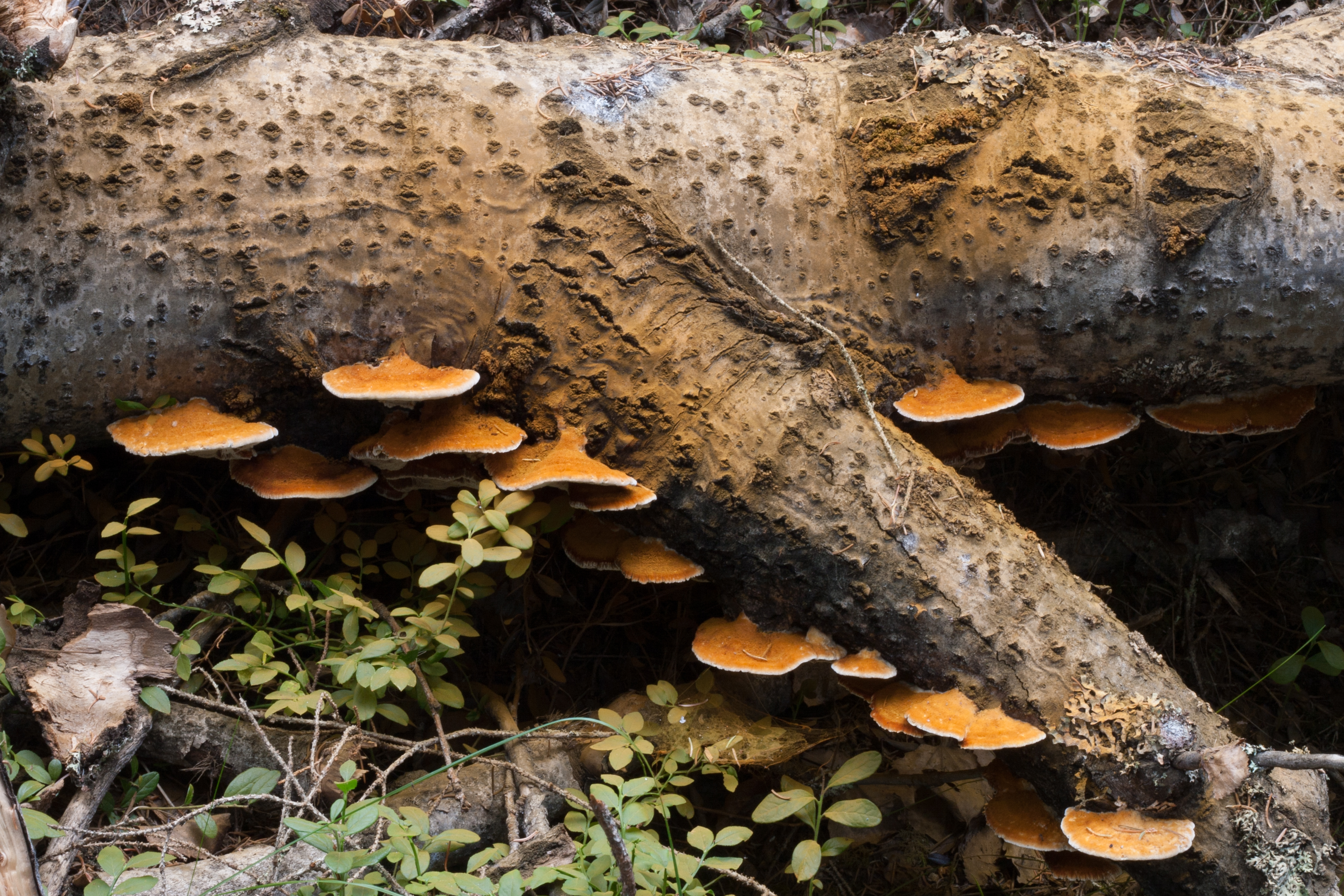
- Inocutis rheades

Scientific classification
- Kingdom: Fungi
- Division: Basidiomycota
- Class: Agaricomycetes
- Order: Hymenochaetales
- Family: Hymenochaetaceae
- Genus: Inocutis; Fiasson & Niemelä (1984)

Type species
- Inocutis rheades (Pers.) Fiasson & Niemelä (1984)

= Inocutis =

Genus of fungi

Inocutis is a genus of twelve species of polypore fungi in the family Hymenochaetaceae.

== Taxonomy ==
The genus was circumscribed by Jean-Louis Fiasson and Tuomo Niemeläin 1984 as a segregate genus from Inonotus. They originally included three European species formerly placed in Inonotus section Phymatopilus, a grouping of species conceived by Marinus Anton Donk in 1974. Molecular data later supported the genus concept. Inocutis is phylogenetically close to Fomitiporella.

== Description ==
Inocutis species produce annual fruit bodies. They are characterized by the absence of setae, the presence of a rudimentary granular core, and the presence of sclerified hyphae in the granular core. They have yellowish to brownish spores that are ellipsoid in shape, and non-dextrinoid. The hyphal system is monomitic, consisting of only generative hyphae. They all grow on deciduous substrates.

== Species ==
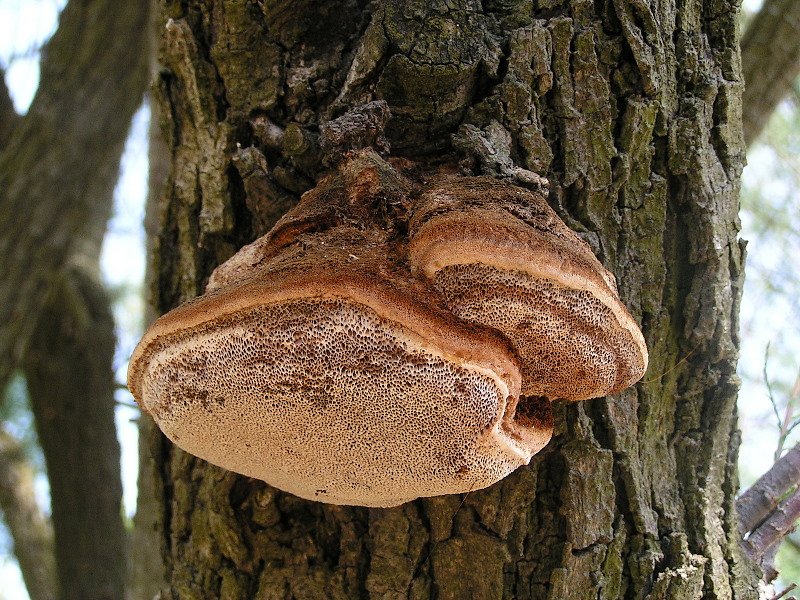
I. tamaricis

- Inocutis dentata (Decock & Ryvarden) Y.C. Dai & F. Wu 2022
- Inocutis dryophila (Berk.) Fiasson & Niemelä 1984
- Inocutis jamaicensis (Murrill) A.M.Gottlieb, J.E.Wright & Moncalvo 2002 – North America; South America
- Inocutis levis (P.Karst.) Y.C.Dai 2000 – China
- Inocutis ludoviciana (Pat.) T.Wagner & M.Fisch. 2002
- Inocutis mikadoi (Lloyd) Y.C. Dai & F. Wu 2022
- Inocutis porrecta (Murrill) Baltazar 2010
- Inocutis rheades (Pers.) Fiasson & Niemelä 1984 – Europe; Middle East
- Inocutis subdryophila Y.C.Dai & H.S.Yuan 2005 – China
- Inocutis tamaricis (Pat.) Fiasson & Niemelä 1984 – Africa; Asia; Europe; Middle East
- Inocutis tenuicarnis (Pegler & D.A. Reid) Y.C. Dai & F. Wu 2022
- Inocutis texana (Murrill) S.Martínez 2006 – North America; South America
