= Tropicoporus =

Scientific classification
- Kingdom: Fungi
- Division: Basidiomycota
- Class: Agaricomycetes
- Order: Hymenochaetales
- Family: Hymenochaetaceae
- Genus: Tropicoporus; L.W.Zhou, Y.C.Dai & Sheng H.Wu (2015)

Type species
- Tropicoporus excentrodendri L.W.Zhou & Y.C.Dai (2015)

Species
- T. cubensis T. dependens T. excentrodendri T. guanacastensis T. linteus T. pseudolinteus T. rudis T. sideroxylicola T. tropicalis

Genus of fungi

Tropicoporus is a genus of fungi in the family Hymenochaetaceae. It was circumscribed in 2015 with Tropicoporus excentrodendri as the type species, and six additional species transferred from Inonotus.
