= Botryodontia =

Scientific classification
- Kingdom: Fungi
- Division: Basidiomycota
- Class: Agaricomycetes
- Order: Polyporales
- Family: Phanerochaetaceae
- Genus: Botryodontia (Hjortstam & Ryvarden) Hjortstam

Genus of fungi

Botryodontia is a genus of fungi belonging to the family Hymenochaetaceae. Botryodontia is now considered a later synonym of Rigidoporus.

Species:

- Botryodontia millavensis
