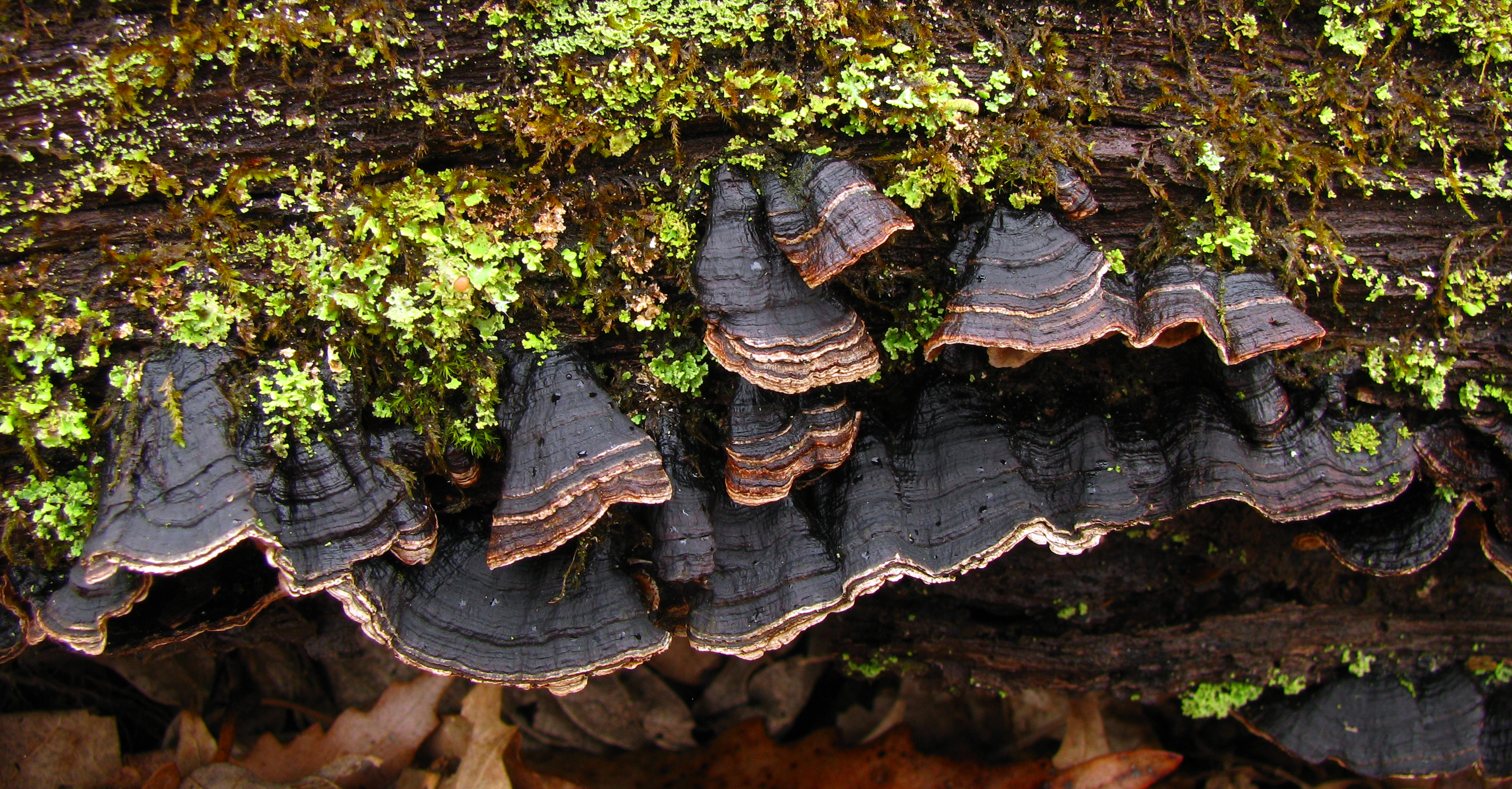
- Hymenochaete rubiginosa

Scientific classification
- Kingdom: Fungi
- Division: Basidiomycota
- Class: Agaricomycetes
- Order: Hymenochaetales
- Family: Hymenochaetaceae
- Genus: Hymenochaete; Lév. (1846)

Type species
- Hymenochaete rubiginosa (Dicks.) Lév. (1846)

Synonyms
- Leptochaete Lév. (1846); Hymenochaetella P.Karst. (1889); Cyclomycetella Murrill (1904); Cycloporellus Murrill (1907); Stipitochaete Ryvarden (1985)

= Hymenochaete =

Genus of fungi

Hymenochaete is a genus of fungi in the family Hymenochaetaceae. The genus has a widespread distribution, especially in tropical regions.

The name probably means long-haired membrane from the Greek hymen meaning membrane and chaite meaning long hair.

On the basis of sequence data, in 2002 the genus Pseudochaete was constructed for Hymenochaete tabacina, as it was found to be more closely related to the poroid Hymenochaetales Onnia and Porodaedalea. Pseudochaete is however considered illegitimate since it is preoccupied by an algal genus.

== Species ==
- H. aberrans
- H. acanthophysata
- H. adusta
- H. agathicola
- H. allantospora
- H. americana
- H. anomala
- H. attenuata
- H. barbata
- H. berteroi
- H. biformisetosa – Yunnan Province, China
- H. bispora
- H. boidinii
- H. boninensis
- H. borbonica
- H. borealis
- H. burdsallii
- H. cacao
- H. carpatica
- H. cervina
- H. cervinoidea
- H. cinnamomea
- H. coffeana
- H. colliculosa
- H. contiformis
- H. corrugata
- H. cruenta
- H. curtisii
- H. damicornis
- H. denticulata
- H. depallens
- H. dictator
- H. digitata
- H. dissimilis
- H. dura
- H. epichlora
- H. episphaeria
- H. escobarii
- H. fasciculata
- H. floridea
- H. fomitoporioides
- H. fuliginosa
- H. fulva
- H. fuscobadia
- H. gigaspora
- H. gillesii
- H. gladiola
- H. globispora
- H. harpago
- H. hauerslevii
- H. innexa
- H. intricata
- H. jobii
- H. konradii
- H. lenta
- H. leonina
- H. lictor
- H. lignosa
- H. livens
- H. longispora
- H. luteobadia
- H. macrospora
- H. magnahypha
- H. microcycla
- H. microspora
- H. minor
- H. minuscula
- H. mollis
- H. mougeotii
- H. murina
- H. muroiana
- H. nanospora
- H. nothofagicola
- H. noxia
- H. ochromarginata
- H. opaca
- H. palmicola
- H. papyracea
- H. parmastoi
- H. patelliformis
- H. paucisetosa
- H. pellicula
- H. pertenuis
- H. pinnatifida
- H. plurimaesetae
- H. pratensis
- H. proxima
- H. pseudoadusta
- H. reniformis
- H. reticulata
- H. rhabarbarina
- H. rheicolor
- H. rigidula
- H. rubiginosa
- H. rufomarginata
- H. ryvardenii
- H. semistupposa
- H. senatoumbrina
- H. separabilis
- H. separata
- H. sordida
- H. spathulata
- H. sphaerospora
- H. spinulosetosa
- H. spreta
- H. stratura
- H. subferruginea
- H. subpurpurascens
- H. tasmanica
- H. tenuis
- H. tomentelloidea
- H. ungulata
- H. unicolor
- H. ustulata
- H. vagans
- H. vaginata
- H. vallata
- H. variegata
- H. villosa
- H. yasudae
