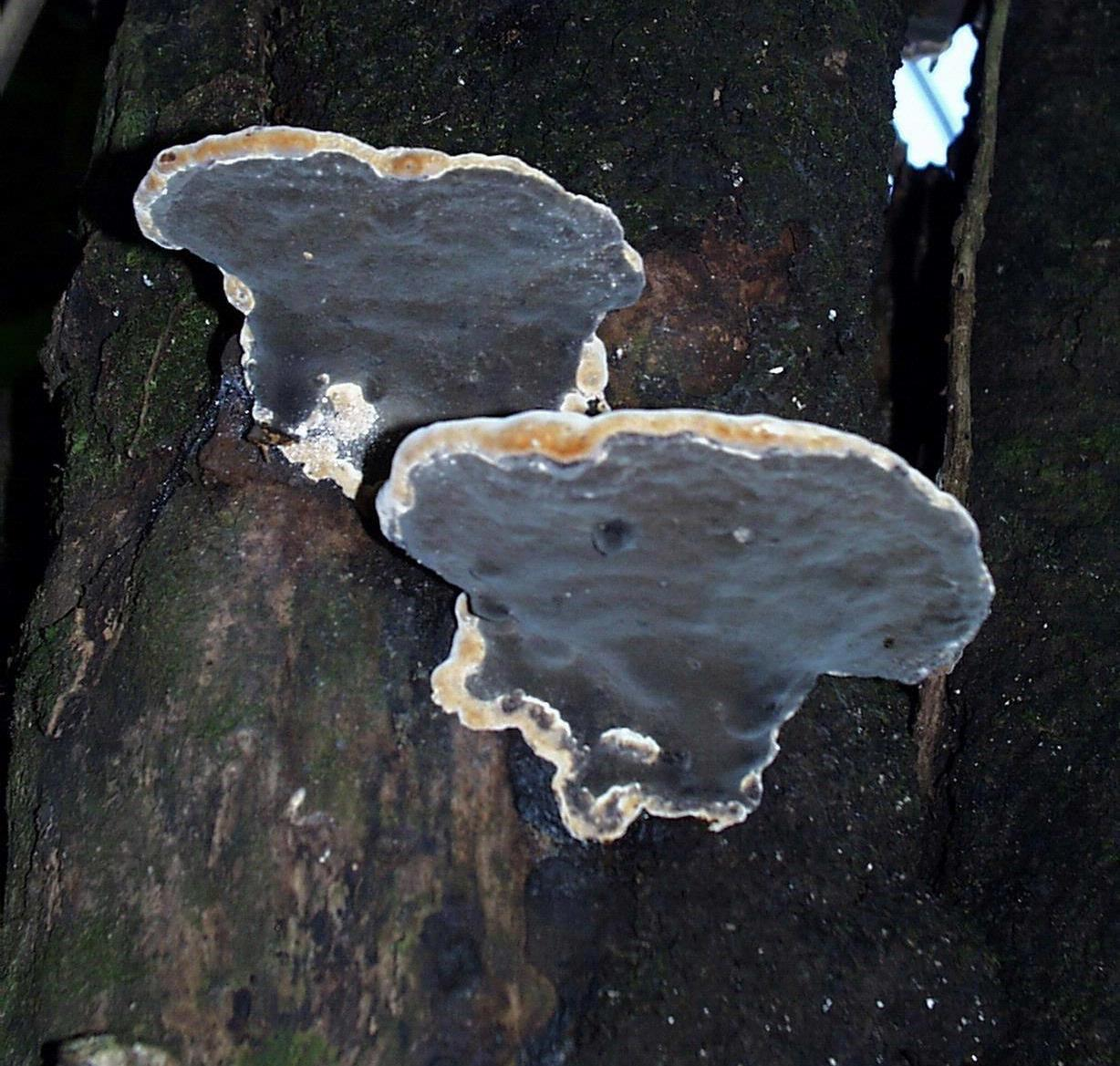
- Fruiting bodies

Scientific classification
- Kingdom: Fungi
- Division: Basidiomycota
- Class: Agaricomycetes
- Order: Hymenochaetales
- Family: Hymenochaetaceae
- Genus: Pyrrhoderma
- Species: P. noxium

Binomial name
- Pyrrhoderma noxium (Corner) L.W. Zhou & Y.C. Dai (2018)

Synonyms
- Fomes noxius Corner, (1932); Phellinidium noxium (Corner) Bondartseva & S. Herrera, (1992); Phellinus noxius (Corner) G.Cunn., (1965)

= Pyrrhoderma noxium =

Species of fungus associated with brown root rot

Pyrrhoderma noxium is a species of polypore fungi identified as plant pathogen. It attacks a wide range of tropical plants causing brown root rot disease. It has been described as "an aggressive and destructive pathogen". The pathogen invades roots with contact between roots of a potential host with the substrate on which the fungus is growing.

== Infection ==
P. noxium attacks the roots and lower trunk of trees, causing roots to rot and resulting in dieback (another term for root rot). It causes brown root rot disease, which afflicts over 200 plant species in tropical and subtropical regions. The pathogen can survive in the soil and on dead plant material for more than a decade, and the primary source of infection to other plants and trees is from contact with infected root material to the healthy plant's root.

== Treatment ==
Fungicides Calixin, Bayleton, and Nustar inhibits growth for P. noxium on agar medium, however was not ultimately found to be effective in eradicating the fungus in infested wood. A mixture of ammonia and urea, as well as just volatile ammonia in itself, was found able to kill P. noxium in infested wood. Strains of Trichoderma applied in mulch around infected P. noxium trees started to grow new roots within 6–8 weeks of application, and the mycelium of P. noxium was eradicated after 8–11 weeks of exposure.

== Distribution ==
P. noxium has been recorded from tropical regions, as well as Japan and Australia, but has not been reported from South America.

== List of countries where P. noxium is present ==
Continent/Country/Region	Distribution	Reference	Notes
Africa
Angola	Present	CABI and EPPO (1997)	
Benin	Present	CABI and EPPO (1997)	
Burkina Faso	Present	CABI and EPPO (1997)	
Cameroon	Present	CABI and EPPO (1997)	
Central African Republic	Present	CABI and EPPO (1997)	
Congo, Democratic Republic of the	Present	CABI and EPPO (1997)	
Côte d'Ivoire	Present	CABI and EPPO (1997)	
Gabon	Present	CABI and EPPO (1997)	
Ghana	Present	CABI and EPPO (1997)	
Kenya	Present	CABI and EPPO (1997)	
Nigeria	Present	CABI and EPPO (1997)	
Sierra Leone	Present	CABI and EPPO (1997)	
Tanzania	Present	CABI and EPPO (1997)	
Togo	Present	CABI and EPPO (1997)	
Uganda	Present	CABI and EPPO (1997)	
Asia
China	Present	CABI and EPPO (1997) Wang et al. (2016)	
Hong Kong	Present	Wang et al. (2016)	
India	Present	CABI and EPPO (1997)	
Assam	Present	CABI and EPPO (1997)	
Karnataka	Present	Zhang and Chee (1989)	
Kerala	Present	CABI and EPPO (1997)	
Tamil Nadu	Present	CABI and EPPO (1997)	
Tripura	Present	CABI and EPPO (1997)	
Uttar Pradesh	Present	CABI and EPPO (1997)	
Indonesia	Present	CABI and EPPO (1997)	
Java	Present	CABI and EPPO (1997)	
Sumatra	Present	CABI and EPPO (1997)	
Japan	Present	CABI and EPPO (1997)	
Bonin Islands	Present	Sahashi et al. (2015)	
Ryukyu Islands	Present	CABI and EPPO (1997)	
Malaysia	Present	CABI and EPPO (1997)	
Peninsular Malaysia	Present	CABI and EPPO (1997)	
Sabah	Present	CABI and EPPO (1997)	
Sarawak	Present	CABI and EPPO (1997)	
Myanmar	Present	CABI and EPPO (1997)	
Pakistan	Present	CABI and EPPO (1997)	
Philippines	Present	CABI and EPPO (1997)	
Singapore	Present	CABI and EPPO (1997)	
Sri Lanka	Present	CABI and EPPO (1997)	
Taiwan	Present	CABI and EPPO (1997)	
Vietnam	Present	CABI and EPPO (1997)	
North America
Costa Rica	Present	CABI and EPPO (1997)	
Cuba	Present	CABI and EPPO (1997)	
Puerto Rico	Present	CABI and EPPO (1997)	
Oceania
American Samoa	Present	CABI and EPPO (1997)	
Australia	Present	CABI and EPPO (1997)	
New South Wales	Present	CABI and EPPO (1997)	
Queensland	Present	CABI and EPPO (1997)	
Federated States of Micronesia	Present	CABI and EPPO (1997)	
Pohnpei	Present	Akiba et al. (2015)	
Fiji	Present	CABI and EPPO (1997)	
Niue	Present	CABI and EPPO (1997)	
Northern Mariana Islands	Present	Hodges and Tenorio (1984)	
Papua New Guinea	Present	CABI and EPPO (1997)	
Samoa	Present	CABI and EPPO (1997)	
Solomon Islands	Present	Liloqula and Johnson (1987)	
Vanuatu	Present		

== Hosts ==
Host	Family	References
Acacia confusa (Philippine wattle)	Fabaceae	
Acacia mangium (black wattle)	Fabaceae	
Adenanthera pavonina (red-bead tree)	Fabaceae	Brooks (2002)
Albizia lebbeck (Indian siris)	Fabaceae	Hodges and Tenorio (1984)
Alstonia scholaris (white cheesewood)	Apocynaceae	Ann et al. (1999) Chang and Yang (1998)
Anacardium occidentale (cashew nut)	Anacardiaceae	Supriadi et al. (2004)
Annona montana	Annonaceae	Ann et al. (1999)
Annona squamosa (sugar apple)	Annonaceae	Ann et al. (1999) Ann et al. (1999) Tsai et al. (2017)
Aralia elata (Japanese aralia)	Araliaceae	Sahashi et al. (2007)
Araucaria cunninghamii (colonial pine)	Araucariaceae	Ann et al. (1999) Brooks (2002) Chang and Yang (1998) Tsai et al. (2017)
Araucaria heterophylla (Norfolk Island pine)	Araucariaceae	Ann et al. (1999) Chang and Yang (1998)
Ardisia sieboldii	Primulaceae	Akiba et al. (2015) Sahashi et al. (2007) Sahashi et al. (2015)
Artemisia capillaris	Asteraceae	Ann et al. (1999) Chang and Yang (1998)
Artocarpus altilis (breadfruit)	Moraceae	Brooks (2002) Hodges and Tenorio (1984)
Artocarpus heterophyllus (jackfruit)	Moraceae	Ann et al. (1999)
Averrhoa carambola (carambola)	Oxalidaceae	Ann et al. (1999) Ann et al. (1999) Tsai et al. (2017)
Azadirachta excelsa	Meliaceae	Farid et al. (2005) Mohd et al. (2009)
Barringtonia asiatica (sea poison tree)	Lecythidaceae	Brooks (2002)
Barringtonia samoensis		Brooks (2002)
Bauhinia (camel's foot)	Fabaceae	Hodges and Tenorio (1984)
Bauhinia purpurea (purple bauhinia)	Fabaceae	Ann et al. (1999) Chang and Yang (1998)
Bauhinia variegata (mountain ebony)	Fabaceae	
Bischofia javanica (bishop wood)	Euphorbiaceae	Ann et al. (1999) Chang and Yang (1998) Sahashi et al. (2010) Sahashi et al. (2015) Sahashi et al. (2014)
Bombax ceiba (silk cotton tree)	Bombacaceae	Ann et al. (1999) Chang and Yang (1998)
Calocedrus formosana	Cupressaceae	Tsai et al. (2017)
Calophyllum inophyllum	Calophyllaceae	
Calophyllum neoebudicum		Brooks (2002)
Camellia japonica (camellia)	Theaceae	Ann et al. (1999) Chang and Yang (1998)
Camellia sinensis (tea)	Theaceae	Ann et al. (1999)
Cananga odorata (ylang-ylang)	Annonaceae	Brooks (2002)
Canarium harveyi	Strombidae	Brooks (2002)
Cassia fistula (Indian laburnum)	Fabaceae	Ann et al. (1999) Chang and Yang (1998)
Casuarina (beefwood)	Casuarinaceae	Hodges and Tenorio (1984)
Casuarina equisetifolia	Casuarinaceae	
Ceiba speciosa		Akiba et al. (2015)
Celtis boninensis		Akiba et al. (2015) Sahashi et al. (2015)
Celtis sinensis (Chinese elm)	Ulmaceae	Wang et al. (2016)
Cerbera manghas	Apocynaceae	Brooks (2002)
Chorisia speciosa (floss-silk tree)	Bombacaceae	Ann et al. (1999)
Cinnamomum camphora (camphor laurel)	Lauraceae	Ann et al. (1999) Chang and Yang (1998) Huang et al. (2015) Tsai et al. (2017)
Cinnamomum doederleinii	Lauraceae	Akiba et al. (2015)
Cinnamomum japonicum	Lauraceae	Sahashi et al. (2007) Sahashi et al. (2010)
Cinnamomum kanehirai	Lauraceae	Ann et al. (1999) Chang and Yang (1998)
Cinnamomum kotoense		Tsai et al. (2017)
Cinnamomum osmophloeum (native cassia bark tree)	Lauraceae	Tsai et al. (2017)
Cinnamomum pseudopedunculatum		Akiba et al. (2015) Sahashi et al. (2015)
Cinnamomum verum (cinnamon)	Lauraceae	Ann et al. (1999) Chang and Yang (1998)
Cinnamomum yabunikkei		Akiba et al. (2015)
Citrus	Rutaceae	Hodges and Tenorio (1984)
Citrus limon (lemon)	Rutaceae	Tsai et al. (2017)
Codiaeum variegatum (garden croton)	Euphorbiaceae	Ann et al. (1999)
Coffea (coffee)	Rubiaceae	
Coffea arabica (arabica coffee)	Rubiaceae	Ann et al. (1999)
Cordia alliodora (Ecuador laurel)	Boraginaceae	Brooks (2002)
Cordia aspera		Brooks (2002)
Cordia dichotoma (Indian cherry)	Boraginaceae	Ann et al. (1999) Chang and Yang (1998)
Corymbia citriodora (lemon-scented gum)	Lithomyrtus	Chang and Yang (1998) Tsai et al. (2017)
Crossostylis biflora		Brooks (2002)
Cycas taitungensis	Cycadaceae	Ann et al. (1999) Chang and Yang (1998)
Dalbergia sissoo	Fabaceae	Ann et al. (1999)
Delonix regia (flamboyant)	Fabaceae	Ann et al. (1999) Chang and Yang (1998) Hodges and Tenorio (1984) Huang et al. (2015) Tsai et al. (2017)
Dimocarpus longan (longan tree)	Sapindaceae	Ann et al. (1999) Tsai et al. (2017) Ann et al. (2002)
Diospyros decandra		Ann et al. (1999)
Diospyros kaki (persimmon)	Ebenaceae	Ann et al. (1999) Tsai et al. (2017)
Diospyros samoensis	Ebenaceae	Brooks (2002)
Diospyros vera	Ebenaceae	Akiba et al. (2015)
Distylium lepidotum	Hamamelidaceae	Akiba et al. (2015) Sahashi et al. (2015)
Distylium racemosum (isu)	Hamamelidaceae	Akiba et al. (2015)
Duranta erecta (golden dewdrop)	Verbenaceae	Ann et al. (1999) Tsai et al. (2017)
Dypsis lutescens (yellow butterfly palm)	Arecaceae	Huang et al. (2015)
Dysoxylum samoense	Meliaceae	Brooks (2002)
Ehretia philippinensis		Akiba et al. (2015)
Elaeagnus rotundata		Sahashi et al. (2015)
Elaeis guineensis (African oil palm)	Arecaceae	Pinruan et al. (2010)
Elaeocarpus serratus	Elaeocarpaceae	Ann et al. (1999) Chang and Yang (1998)
Elaeocarpus sylvestris	Elaeocarpaceae	Sahashi et al. (2007) Akiba et al. (2015)
Elattostachys falcata		Brooks (2002)
Eriobotrya japonica (loquat)	Rosaceae	Ann et al. (1999) Ann et al. (1999) Tsai et al. (2017)
Erythrina	Fabaceae	Hodges and Tenorio (1984)
Erythrina variegata (Indian coral tree)	Fabaceae	Akiba et al. (2015) Sahashi et al. (2015)
Eucalyptus	Myrtaceae	Ann et al. (1999)
Eucalyptus camaldulensis (red gum)	Myrtaceae	Chang and Yang (1998)
Eucalyptus grandis (saligna gum)	Myrtaceae	Chang and Yang (1998)
Eucalyptus pellita (red mahogany)	Myrtaceae	Agustini et al. (2014) Glen et al. (2014)
Eugenia uniflora (Surinam cherry)	Lithomyrtus	Akiba et al. (2015)
Euonymus boninensis		Sahashi et al. (2015)
Ficus	Moraceae	Brooks (2002)
Ficus awkeotsang (jelly fig)	Moraceae	Ann et al. (1999) Ann et al. (1999) Tsai et al. (2017)
Ficus benghalensis (banyan)	Moraceae	Akiba et al. (2015) Sahashi et al. (2015)
Ficus benjamina (weeping fig)	Moraceae	Huang et al. (2015)
Ficus elastica (rubber plant)	Moraceae	Akiba et al. (2015) Sahashi et al. (2015)
Ficus microcarpa (Indian laurel)	Moraceae	
Ficus obliqua		Brooks (2002)
Ficus pumila (creeping fig)	Moraceae	Chang and Yang (1998)
Ficus punctata		Ann et al. (1999)
Ficus religiosa (sacred fig tree)	Moraceae	Ann et al. (1999) Chang and Yang (1998) Tsai et al. (2017)
Ficus tinctoria		Akiba et al. (2015) Brooks (2002)
Ficus virgata	Moraceae	Akiba et al. (2015) Sahashi et al. (2007)
Firmiana simplex	Sterculiaceae	Ann et al. (1999) Chang and Yang (1998)
Flueggea flexuosa	Euphorbiaceae	Brooks (2002)
Fraxinus formosana	Oleaceae	Ann et al. (1999) Chang and Yang (1998)
Garcinia mangostana (mangosteen)	Clusiaceae	
Garcinia subelliptica	Clusiaceae	Akiba et al. (2015) Sahashi et al. (2010)
Gardenia jasminoides (cape jasmine)	Rubiaceae	Ann et al. (1999)
Glochidion obovatum	Euphorbiaceae	Akiba et al. (2015) Sahashi et al. (2007)
Glochidion ramiflorum		Brooks (2002)
Gmelina arborea (candahar)	Lamiaceae	Brooks (2002)
Grevillea robusta (silky oak)	Proteaceae	Ann et al. (1999)
Hernandia nymphaeifolia	Hernandiaceae	Brooks (2002) Sahashi et al. (2007)
Hevea brasiliensis (rubber)	Euphorbiaceae	Brooks (2002) Mohd et al. (2009) Nandris et al. (1988)
Hibiscus glaber	Malvaceae	Sahashi et al. (2015)
Hibiscus rosa-sinensis (Chinese rose)	Malvaceae	Akiba et al. (2015) Ann et al. (1999) Chang and Yang (1998) Sahashi et al. (2007)
Hibiscus schizopetalus (fringed hibiscus)	Malvaceae	Ann et al. (1999)
Hibiscus tiliaceus (coast cottonwood)	Malvaceae	Akiba et al. (2015) Ann et al. (1999) Brooks (2002) Chang and Yang (1998)
Hydrangea chinensis		Ann et al. (1999)
Ilex rotunda (kurogane holly)	Aquifoliaceae	Sahashi et al. (2007)
Inocarpus fagifer	Fabaceae	Brooks (2002)
Intsia bijuga (Moluccan ironwood)	Fabaceae	Brooks (2002)
Ipomoea pes-caprae (beach morning glory)	Convolvulaceae	Ann et al. (1999) Chang and Yang (1998)
Jatropha integerrima (peregrina)	Euphorbiaceae	Sahashi et al. (2015)
Juniperus chinensis var. kaizuka	Cupressaceae	Tsai et al. (2017)
Keteleeria davidiana var. formosana		Ann et al. (1999) Chang and Yang (1998)
Khaya senegalensis (dry zone mahogany)	Meliaceae	Burcham et al. (2015) Wang et al. (2016)
Kigelia africana (sausage tree)	Bignoniaceae	Ann et al. (1999) Tsai et al. (2017)
Koelreuteria elegans (flamegold rain tree)	Sapindaceae	
Koelreuteria paniculata (golden rain tree)	Sapindaceae	
Lactuca indica (Indian lettuce)	Asteraceae	Ann et al. (1999) Chang and Yang (1998)
Lagerstroemia speciosa (Pride of India)	Lythraceae	Ann et al. (1999)
Lagerstroemia subcostata	Lythraceae	Sahashi et al. (2007)
Lagerstroemia turbinata		Chang and Yang (1998)
Lannea coromandelica	Anacardiaceae	Supriadi et al. (2004)
Lantana camara (lantana)	Verbenaceae	Ann et al. (1999) Chang and Yang (1998)
Leptopetalum grayi		Sahashi et al. (2015)
Leucaena leucocephala (leucaena)	Fabaceae	Akiba et al. (2015) Ann et al. (1999) Chang and Yang (1998) Hodges and Tenorio (1984) Sahashi et al. (2015)
Ligustrum japonicum (Japanese privet)	Oleaceae	Sahashi et al. (2007)
Ligustrum micranthum	Oleaceae	Akiba et al. (2015) Sahashi et al. (2015)
Liquidambar formosana (beautiful sweetgum)	Hamamelidaceae	Ann et al. (1999) Chang and Yang (1998) Tsai et al. (2017)
Litchi chinensis (lichi)	Sapindaceae	Akiba et al. (2015) Ann et al. (1999) Ann et al. (1999) Tsai et al. (2017)
Litsea glutinosa (Indian laurel)	Lauraceae	Ann et al. (1999) Chang and Yang (1998)
Litsea hypophaea		Ann et al. (1999)
Litsea japonica	Lauraceae	Akiba et al. (2015) Sahashi et al. (2007)
Macaranga harveyana		Brooks (2002)
Macaranga stipulosa		Brooks (2002)
Macaranga tanarius (parasol leaf tree)	Euphorbiaceae	Akiba et al. (2015) Chang and Yang (1998) Ann et al. (1999)
Maesa tenera	Myrsinaceae	Ann et al. (1999)
Malpighia emarginata	Malpighiaceae	Sahashi et al. (2015)
Mangifera indica (mango)	Anacardiaceae	Akiba et al. (2015) Dann et al. (2011) Sahashi et al. (2015) Tsai et al. (2017)
Melaleuca bracteata	Lithomyrtus	Tsai et al. (2017)
Melaleuca leucadendra (long-leaved paperbark)	Lithomyrtus	Ann et al. (1999) Chang and Yang (1998)
Melia azedarach (Chinaberry)	Meliaceae	Akiba et al. (2015) Ann et al. (1999) Sahashi et al. (2010) Sahashi et al. (2015)
Michelia compressa	Magnoliaceae	Ann et al. (1999) Chang and Yang (1998)
Michelia figo	Magnoliaceae	Ann et al. (1999)
Morinda citrifolia (Indian mulberry)	Rubiaceae	Brooks (2002)
Morus australis	Moraceae	Akiba et al. (2015) Sahashi et al. (2007) Sahashi et al. (2015)
Murraya paniculata (orange jessamine)	Rutaceae	Ann et al. (1999) Sahashi et al. (2007) Tsai et al. (2017)
Nandina domestica (Nandina)	Berberidaceae	Akiba et al. (2015) Sahashi et al. (2007)
Neolitsea sericea	Lauraceae	Sahashi et al. (2015) Akiba et al. (2015)
Neonauclea forsteri	Rubiaceae	Brooks (2002)
Nerium oleander (oleander)	Apocynaceae	Ann et al. (1999) Chang and Yang (1998)
Ochrosia nakaiana	Apocynaceae	Sahashi et al. (2015)
Osmanthus fragrans	Oleaceae	Tsai et al. (2017)
Osmanthus insularis		Akiba et al. (2015) Sahashi et al. (2015)
Pachira aquatica (pachira nut)	Bombacaceae	Sahashi et al. (2015) Ann et al. (1999) Chang and Yang (1998)
Palaquium formosanum	Sapotaceae	Ann et al. (1999) Chang and Yang (1998)
Pandanus boninensis		Sahashi et al. (2015)
Persea thunbergii	Lauraceae	Akiba et al. (2015) Sahashi et al. (2007) Sahashi et al. (2010)
Persea zuihoensis	Lauraceae	Ann et al. (1999)
Pinus thunbergii (Japanese black pine)	Pinaceae	Ann et al. (1999) Chang and Yang (1998)
Pipturus argenteus	Urticaceae	Brooks (2002)
Pistacia chinensis (Chinese pistachio)	Anacardiaceae	Ann et al. (1999) Chang and Yang (1998)
Pittosporum tobira (Japanese pittosporum)	Pittosporaceae	Akiba et al. (2015)
Planchonella grayana		Brooks (2002)
Planchonella obovata	Sapotaceae	Akiba et al. (2015) Sahashi et al. (2015)
Planchonella torricellensis	Sapotaceae	Brooks (2002)
Podocarpus macrophyllus (long-leaf podocarpus)	Podocarpaceae	
Pometia pinnata (Fijian longan)	Sapindaceae	Brooks (2002)
Pongamia pinnata (Indian beech)	Fabaceae	Ann et al. (1999) Chang and Yang (1998)
Populus deltoides (poplar)	Salicaceae	Sujan and Pandey (1989)
Prunus armeniaca (apricot)	Rosaceae	Tsai et al. (2017)
Prunus campanulata (Taiwan cherry)	Rosaceae	Akiba et al. (2015) Sahashi et al. (2015) Ann et al. (1999) Tsai et al. (2017)
Prunus mume (Japanese apricot tree)	Rosaceae	Ann et al. (1999) Chang and Yang (1998) Tsai et al. (2017) Ann et al. (1999)
Prunus persica (peach)	Rosaceae	Akiba et al. (2015) Ann et al. (1999) Sahashi et al. (2007) Tsai et al. (2017)
Psidium cattleianum (strawberry guava)	Lithomyrtus	Sahashi et al. (2015)
Psidium guajava (guava)	Lithomyrtus	Tsai et al. (2017)
Pterocarpus indicus (red sandalwood)	Fabaceae	Ann et al. (1999) Chang and Yang (1998) Tsai et al. (2017)
Pyrus communis (European pear)	Rosaceae	Ann et al. (1999)
Pyrus pyrifolia (Oriental pear tree)	Rosaceae	Tsai et al. (2017) Ann et al. (1999)
Rhaphiolepis indica	Rosaceae	Sahashi et al. (2015)
Rhaphiolepis indica var. umbellata		Akiba et al. (2015) Sahashi et al. (2007) Sahashi et al. (2010) Sahashi et al. (2015)
Rhaphiolepis umbellata (Yedda hawthorne)	Rosaceae	Sahashi et al. (2007)
Roystonea regia (Cuban royal palm)	Arecaceae	Ann et al. (1999)
Salix babylonica (weeping willow)	Salicaceae	
Samanea saman (rain tree)	Fabaceae	Brooks (2002)
Schinus terebinthifolius (Brazilian pepper tree)	Anacardiaceae	Tsai et al. (2017)
Spathodea campanulata (African tulip tree)	Bignoniaceae	Tsai et al. (2017)
Spondias dulcis (otaheite apple)	Anacardiaceae	Brooks (2002) Sahashi et al. (2015)
Stachytarpheta jamaicensis (Jamaica vervain)	Verbenaceae	Sahashi et al. (2015)
Sterculia foetida (Java olive)	Sterculiaceae	Ann et al. (1999)
Sterculia lanceolata		Huang et al. (2016)
Swietenia macrophylla (big leaved mahogany)	Meliaceae	Brooks (2002) Sujan et al. (1980)
Swietenia mahagoni (Cuban mahogany)	Meliaceae	
Syzygium	Lithomyrtus	Brooks (2002)
Syzygium inophylloides	Lithomyrtus	Brooks (2002)
Syzygium samarangense (water apple)	Lithomyrtus	Ann et al. (1999) Ann et al. (1999) Tsai et al. (2017)
Taiwania cryptomerioides (taiwania)	Chrysomelidae	Ann et al. (1999) Chang and Yang (1998)
Tectona grandis (teak)	Lamiaceae	Farid et al. (2005) Mohd et al. (2009) Mohd et al. (2005) Farid et al. (2005)
Terminalia catappa (Singapore almond)	Combretaceae	Akiba et al. (2015) Ann et al. (1999) Sahashi et al. (2015) Tsai et al. (2017)
Terminalia richii	Combretaceae	Brooks (2002)
Theobroma cacao (cocoa)	Malvaceae	Brooks (2002)
Thespesia populnea (portia tree)	Malvaceae	Hodges and Tenorio (1984)
Toona sinensis (Chinese Toona)	Meliaceae	Tsai et al. (2017)
Toxicodendron succedaneum (wax tree)	Anacardiaceae	Sahashi et al. (2007) Sahashi et al. (2015)
Trachelospermum asiaticum	Apocynaceae	Sahashi et al. (2015)
Trema orientalis (charcoal tree)	Ulmaceae	Akiba et al. (2015) Sahashi et al. (2015)
Ulmus parvifolia (lacebark elm)	Ulmaceae	Ann et al. (1999) Chang and Yang (1998)
Urena lobata (caesar weed)	Malvaceae	Ann et al. (1999)
Vernicia fordii (tung-oil tree)	Euphorbiaceae	Ann et al. (1999) Chang and Yang (1998)
Virola surinamensis (banak)	Myristicaceae	Brooks (2002)
Vitis (grape)	Vitaceae	Ann et al. (1999)
Vitis vinifera (grapevine)	Vitaceae	Ann et al. (1999) Tsai et al. (2017)
Wikstroemia pseudoretusa	Thymelaeaceae	Sahashi et al. (2015)
Zanthoxylum ailanthoides	Rutaceae	Sahashi et al. (2015)
Ziziphus mauritiana (jujube)	Rhamnaceae	Tsai et al. (2017)

== Brown root rot ==
P. noxium causes brown root rot, which is a serious problem in Taiwan and Hong Kong.

== See also ==
- Root rot
