= Phellinus sulphurascens =

Scientific classification
- Domain: Eukaryota
- Kingdom: Fungi
- Division: Basidiomycota
- Class: Agaricomycetes
- Order: Hymenochaetales
- Family: Hymenochaetaceae
- Genus: Phellinus
- Species: P. sulphurascens

Binomial name
- Phellinus sulphurascens Pilát

Synonyms
- Coniferiporia sulphurascens; Inonotus sulphurascens; Phellinidium sulphurascens

Species of fungus

Phellinus sulphurascens is the Douglas-fir species of the fungus genus, Phellinus. It was recently recognized as a distinct species from Phellinus weirii. Both were historically thought to be the same, but genetic tests suggested that the two species were distinct. The form first described as P. weirii is the cedar form.
