= Erythromyces =

Scientific classification
- Kingdom: Fungi
- Division: Basidiomycota
- Class: Agaricomycetes
- Order: Hymenochaetales
- Family: Hymenochaetaceae
- Genus: Erythromyces; Hjortstam & Ryvarden (1990)

Type species
- Erythromyces crocicreas (Berk. & Broome) Hjortstam & Ryvarden (1990)

Genus of fungi

Erythromyces is a genus of fungi in the family Hymenochaetaceae. It currently contains only the type species, Erythromyces crocicreas.
