= Inonotopsis =

Scientific classification
- Kingdom: Fungi
- Division: Basidiomycota
- Class: Agaricomycetes
- Order: Hymenochaetales
- Family: Hymenochaetaceae
- Genus: Inonotopsis; Parmasto (1973)

Type species
- Inonotopsis subiculosa (Peck) Parmasto (1973)

Genus of fungi

Inonotopsis is a fungal genus in the family Hymenochaetaceae. The genus is monotypic, containing the single species Inonotopsis subiculosa, which is widespread in north temperate regions.
