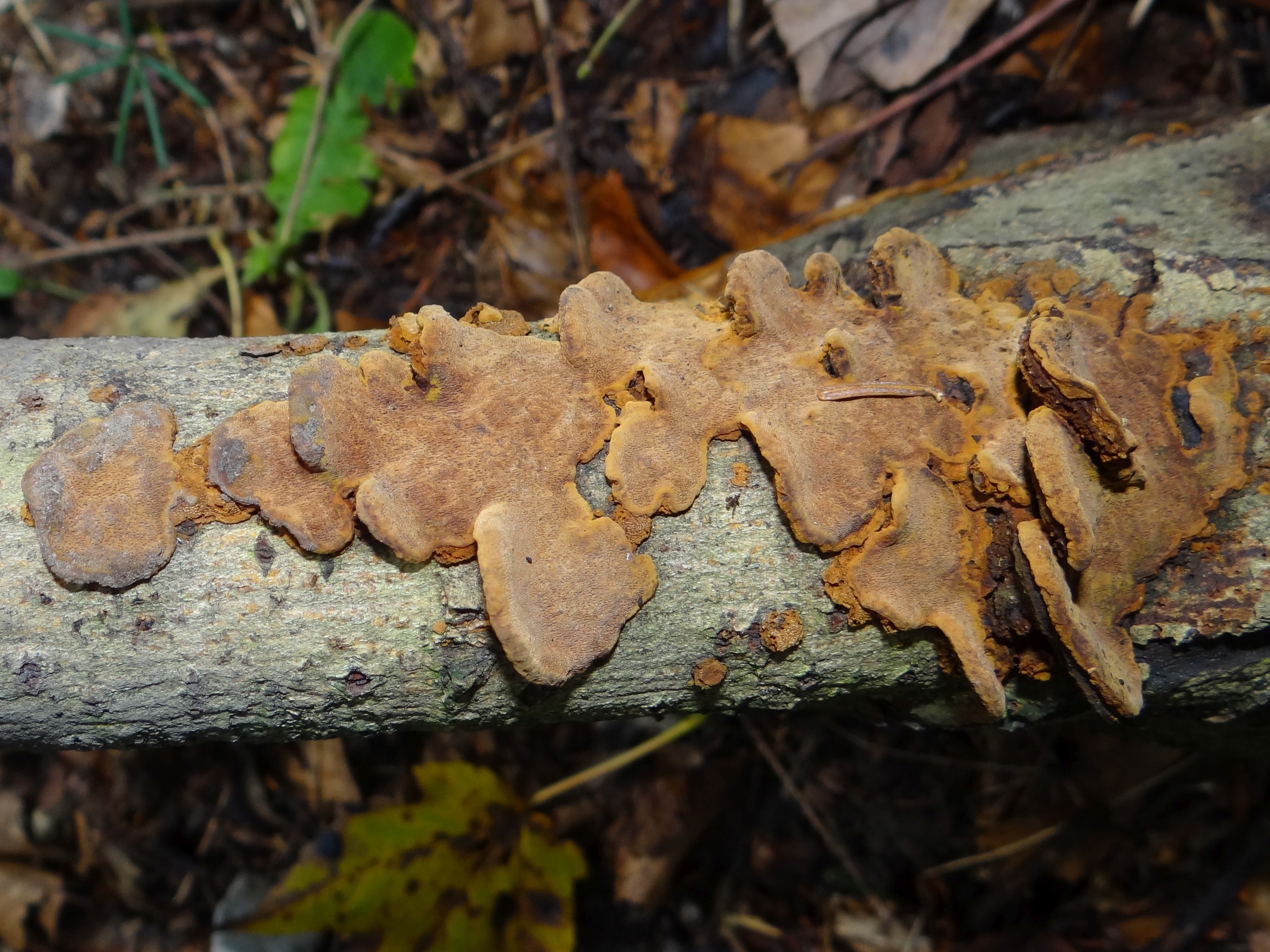
- Phellinus conchatus

Scientific classification
- Kingdom: Fungi
- Division: Basidiomycota
- Class: Agaricomycetes
- Order: Hymenochaetales
- Family: Hymenochaetaceae
- Genus: Phellinopsis; Y.C.Dai (2010)

Type species
- Phellinopsis conchata (Pers.) Y.C.Dai (2010)

Species
- P. asetosa P. conchata P. junipericola P. occidentalis P. resupinata

= Phellinopsis =

Genus of fungi

Phellinopsis is a genus of four species of fungi in the family Hymenochaetaceae. It was newly circumscribed in 2010, containing P. occidentalis and the type species P. conchata. P. junipericola and P. resupinata were added in 2012, and P. asetosa in 2015.
