= Clavariachaete =

Scientific classification
- Kingdom: Fungi
- Division: Basidiomycota
- Class: Agaricomycetes
- Order: Hymenochaetales
- Family: Hymenochaetaceae
- Genus: Clavariachaete; Corner (1950)

Type species
- Clavariachaete rubiginosa (as rubiginosum) (1950) (Berk. & M.A. Curtis ex Cooke) Corner

Genus of fungi

Clavariachaete is a genus of fungi in the family Hymenochaetaceae.

== Species ==
- Clavariachaete peckoltii
- Clavariachaete rubiginosa
