= Dichochaete =

Scientific classification
- Kingdom: Fungi
- Division: Basidiomycota
- Class: Agaricomycetes
- Order: Hymenochaetales
- Family: Hymenochaetaceae
- Genus: Dichochaete; Parmasto (2000)

Type species
- Dichochaete setosa (Sw.) Parmasto (2000)

Species
- D. ceratophora D. setosa

Genus of fungi

Dichochaete is a genus of fungi in the family Hymenochaetaceae. The genus was circumscribed in 2000 by Estonia mycologist Erast Parmasto.
