= Brown root rot =

Fungal disease of plants

Brown root rot disease is a destructive plant disease caused by fungi, primarily Phellinus noxius. It affects a wide range of plants, including trees, shrubs, and crops, leading to root decay, poor growth, and often the death of the plant. This disease is common in tropical and subtropical regions with warm, moist climates.

== Host plants ==
- Trees: Mango, rubber, avocado, and cacao trees.
- Shrubs and ornamentals: Coffee, tea, and other decorative plants.
- Crops: Legumes, sugarcane, and some vegetables.

== Symptoms ==
Plants affected by brown root rot disease exhibit several noticeable symptoms that progress as the infection worsens. The primary symptom is root decay, where the roots turn brown, decompose, and lose their ability to absorb water and nutrients effectively. This damage to the root system causes the plant to weaken over time. Above ground, the leaves begin to wilt, turn yellow, and eventually fall off, reflecting the plant's declining health. Growth becomes stunted, with infected plants appearing smaller and less vigorous compared to healthy ones. In some cases, a crusty, brown fungal mat may form at the base of the plant or on exposed roots, serving as a visible sign of fungal activity. If the disease remains unchecked, the plant's root system collapses entirely, leading to the plant's death.

== Causes and spread ==
Brown root rot is caused by fungi that live in the soil or on decaying plant material. The primary pathogen, Phellinus noxius, infects plants through their roots, especially if the roots are wounded or stressed.

The disease spreads through:

- Root-to-root contact with infected plants.
- Contaminated soil or water.
- Plant debris left in the field.
