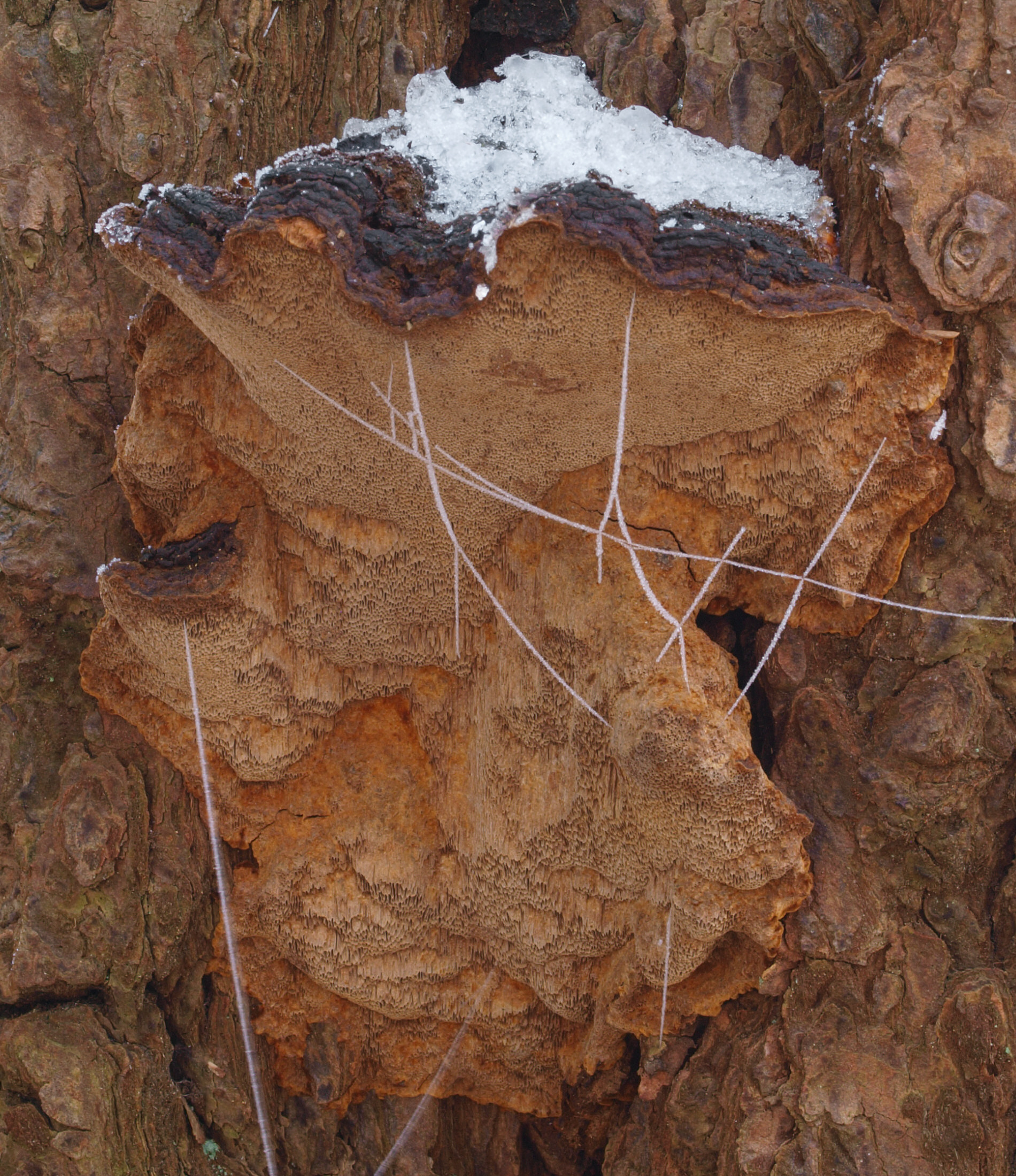
- Porodaedalea pini

Scientific classification
- Kingdom: Fungi
- Division: Basidiomycota
- Class: Agaricomycetes
- Order: Hymenochaetales
- Family: Hymenochaetaceae
- Genus: Porodaedalea; Murrill (1905)

Type species
- Phellinus pini Brot.

Species
- Porodaedalea cancriformans; Porodaedalea cedrina; Porodaedalea himalayensis; Porodaedalea laricis; Porodaedalea lonicerina; Porodaedalea niemelaei; Porodaedalea pilatii; Porodaedalea pini; Porodaedalea yamanoi

Synonyms
- Phellinus subgen. Porodaedalea (Murrill) Y.C.Dai (1999); Phellinus ser. Porodaedalea (Murrill) Zmitr. (2006)

= Porodaedalea =

Genus of fungi

Porodaedalea is a genus of fungi in the family Hymenochaetaceae. The genus was circumscribed by American mycologist William Alphonso Murrill in 1905.
