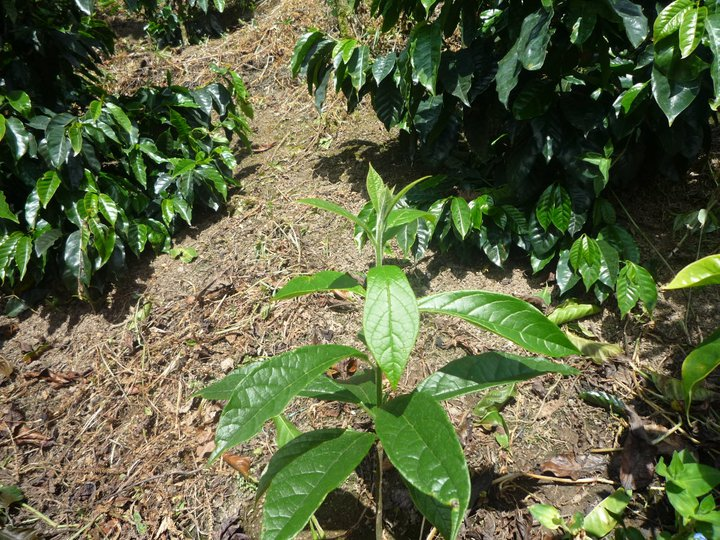
- Sapling

Conservation status
- Least Concern (IUCN 3.1)

Scientific classification
- Kingdom: Plantae
- Clade: Tracheophytes
- Clade: Angiosperms
- Clade: Eudicots
- Clade: Asterids
- Order: Boraginales
- Family: Cordiaceae
- Genus: Cordia
- Species: C. alliodora

Binomial name
- Cordia alliodora (Ruiz & Pav.) Oken

Synonyms
- Cerdana alliodora Ruiz & Pav.; Cerdana cujabensis Silva Manso ex A.DC.; Cordia alliodora var. boliviana Chodat & Vischer; Cordia alliodora var. glabra A.DC.; Cordia alliodora var. tomentosa A.DC.; Cordia alliodora f. albotomentosa Chodat & Hassl.; Cordia andina Chodat; Cordia cerdana Roem. & Schult.; Cordia chamissoniana var. complicata Chodat; Cordia cujabensis Silva Manso & Lhotzky ex Cham.; Cordia gerascanthus var. subcanescens A.DC.; Cordia gerascanthus f. martinicensis Chodat; Cordia goudotii Chodat; Cordia hartwissiana Regel; Cordia rusbyi Britton; Cordia velutina Mart.; Gerascanthus alliodorus (Ruiz & Pav.) M.Kuhlm. & Mattos; Gerascanthus cujabensis (Silva Manso & Lhotzky ex Cham.) Borhidi; Gerascanthus velutinus Fresen.; Lithocardium alliodorum (Ruiz & Pav.) Kuntze; Lithocardium cujabense (Silva Manso & Lhotzky ex Cham.) Kuntze; Lithocardium gerascanthus var. alliodorum (Ruiz & Pav.) Kuntze; Lithocardium hartwigsiana Kuntze; Solanum mucronatum O.E.Schulz; Varronia rusbyi (Britton ex Rusby) Borhidi; Varronia tuberosa Sessé & Moc.

= Cordia alliodora =

Species of tree

Cordia alliodora is a species of flowering tree in the family Cordiaceae, that is native to the American tropics. It is commonly known as Spanish elm, Ecuador laurel, cypre or salmwood. It can reach 35 m in height.

== Taxonomy ==
The species was first described in 1799 by Hipólito Ruiz López and José Antonio Pavón Jiménez, as Cerdana alliodora. In 1841, it was transferred to the genus Cordia by Lorenz Oken. (Cerdana is treated as a synonym of Cordia.)

Among the synonyms of Cordia alliodora is Solanum mucronatum. Solanum is placed in a different family from Cordia (Solanaceae rather than Boraginaceae). Solanum mucronatum was described by Otto Eugen Schulz in 1909. In his description, Schulz expressed doubt that Solanum was the right genus.

== Uses ==
Cordia alliodora is one of several Cordia trees called bocote in Spanish and its wood, which has very little figure, is usually called freijo or jennywood along with that of Cordia goeldiana. The wood is used for boat decking, furniture, cabinetry, guitar/bass building by luthiers, and sometimes substitutes for mahogany or teak.

== Environmental aspects ==
Outside of its indigenous range, Cordia alliodora has been identified as a problematic invasive species. For example, a timber-focused planting program of the species in Vanuatu during the mid-1970s has over time proved disruptive to native ecosystems and communities. The species has been described as a severe environmental nuisance, as it has overtaken natural forests by multiplying at a faster rate than being harvested, and has become susceptible to outbreaks of a form of root rot known as Phellinus noxius.
