= Mario Rajchenberg =

Argentinean mycologist

- Born: May 22, 1954 (age 72); Buenos Aires, Argentina
- Education: Universidad de Buenos Aires
- Awards: Premio Bernardo Houssay
- Scientific career
- Fields: Mycology
- Workplaces: Centro de Investigación y Extensión Forestal Andino Patagónico
- Author abbrev. (botany): Rajchenb.

Mario Rajchenberg (born 22 May 1954) is a Argentinian mycologist and forest pathologist. He is known for his taxonomic work on polypores and other wood-decay fungi of southern South America. He earned his doctorate in biological sciences at the University of Buenos Aires in 1982 and has worked since 1991 at the Centro de Investigación y Extensión Forestal Andino Patagónico (CIEFAP) in Esquel, Chubut, Argentina.

== Eponyms of Mario Rajchenberg ==
=== Eponymous genera ===
- Rajchenbergia Salvador-Mont., Popoff & Drechsler-Santos
- Mariorajchenbergia Gibertoni & C.R.S.de Lira

=== Eponymous species ===
- Crystallicutis rajchenbergii El-Gharabawy, Leal-Dutra & G.W.Griff.
- Dendrothele rajchenbergii A.L.Gallo, Robledo & Gorjón
- Gloeocystidiellum rajchenbergii Gorjón & Hallenb.
- Hericium rajchenbergii Robledo & Hallenb.
- Irpiciporus rajchenbergii Nakasone
- Phlebiodontia rajchenbergii Westph. & Motato-Vásq.
- Phylloporia rajchenbergii Chamorro-Martínez, Raymundo, C.R.Martínez-González & R.Valenz.

== Selected publications ==
- Rajchenberg, M. (2006). Los Políporos (Basidiomycetes) de los Bosques Andino Patagónicos de Argentina / Polypores (Basidiomycetes) from the Patagonian Andes Forests of Argentina. Bibliotheca Mycologica (in Spanish and English). Vol. 201. Stuttgart: J. Cramer. p. 300. ISBN 978-3-443-59103-8.
