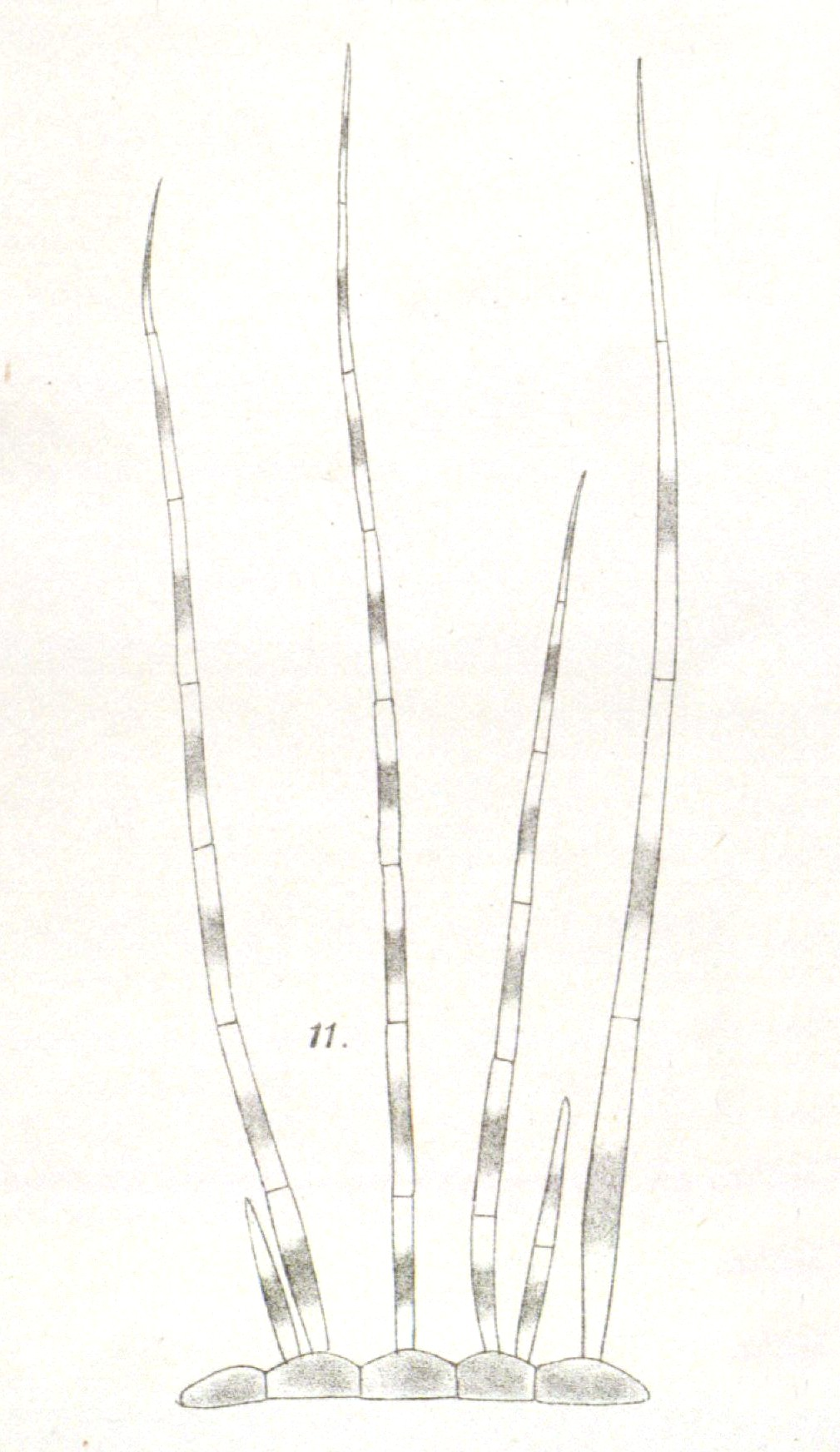

Scientific classification
- Clade: Viridiplantae
- Division: Chlorophyta
- Class: Chlorophyceae
- Order: Chaetophorales
- Family: Chaetophoraceae
- Genus: Pseudochaete; W. West & G.S. West, 1903

Type species
- Pseudochaete crassisetum

Species
- Pseudochaete crassisetum; Pseudochaete gracilis

= Pseudochaete =

Genus of algae

Pseudochaete is a genus of green algae, in the family Chaetophoraceae. However, this genus is not recognized by all authorities, sometimes being considered part of genus Stigeoclonium.

The name Pseudochaete, published by T. Wagner & M. Fischer in 2002, is also used for a genus of fungi belonging to the family Hymenochaetaceae and formerly part of genus Hymenochaete described by Léveillé. According to Index Fungorum, the fungus name is illegitimate (and the algal genus has priority) but its use is widespread.

Pseudochaete consists of heterotrichous, uniseriate filaments. The basal part of the thallus is prostrate, from which erect filaments emerge. Prostrate filaments are short, branched, with cells containing a nucleus and a parietal chloroplast with a pyrenoid. Erect filaments are hair-like, five to eight cells long, with cylindrical cells and chloroplast lacking pyrenoids.
