= Cortinarius sulfurinus =

Scientific classification
- Domain: Eukaryota
- Kingdom: Fungi
- Division: Basidiomycota
- Class: Agaricomycetes
- Order: Agaricales
- Family: Cortinariaceae
- Genus: Cortinarius
- Species: C. sulfurinus

Binomial name
- Cortinarius sulfurinus Quél., 1884

Species of fungus

Cortinarius sulfurinus is a species of fungus belonging to the family Cortinariaceae.

Synonym:

- Cortinarius sulfurinus var. sulfurinus Quél., 1884
