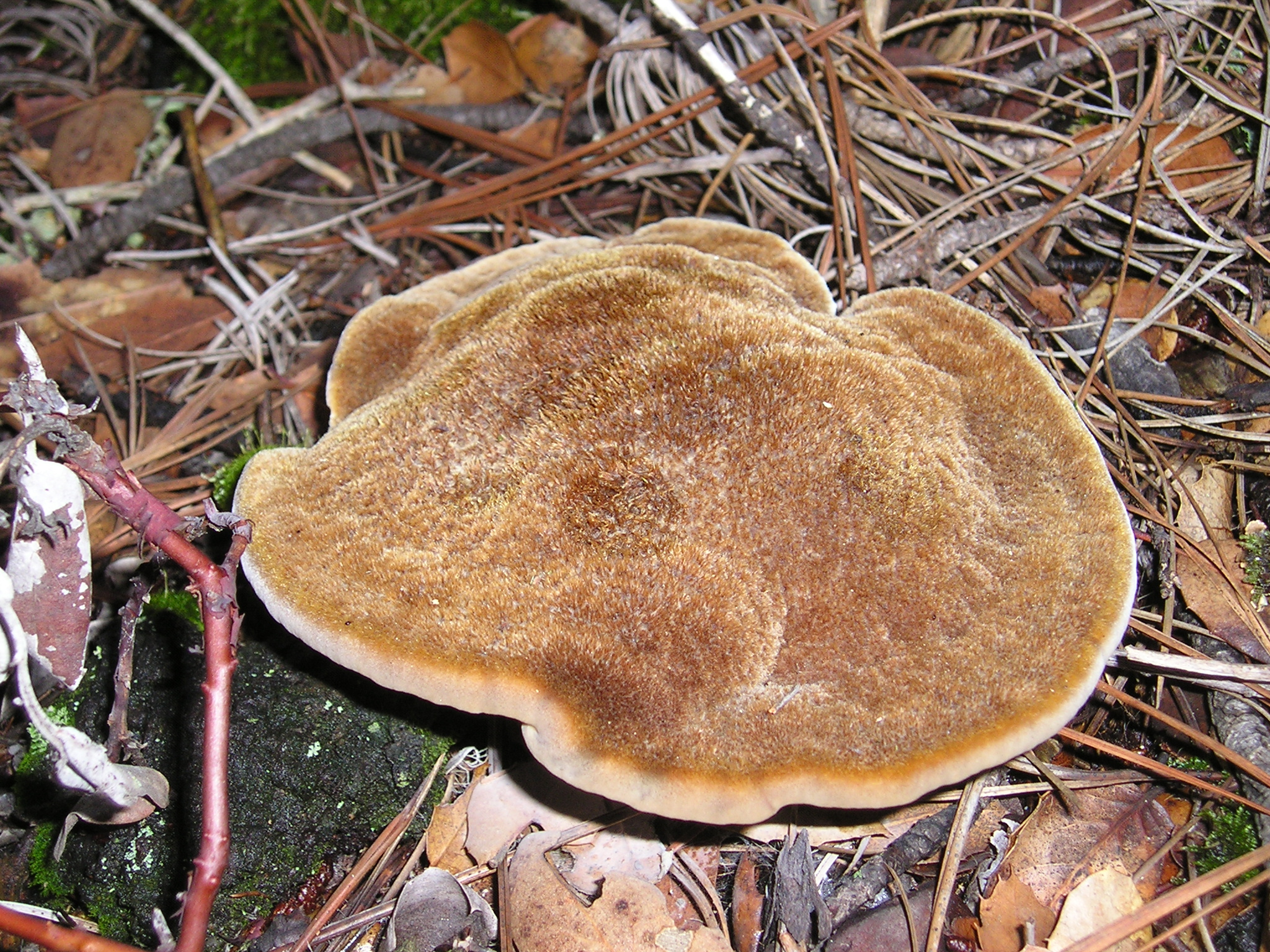
- Onnia tomentosa

Scientific classification
- Domain: Eukaryota
- Kingdom: Fungi
- Division: Basidiomycota
- Class: Agaricomycetes
- Order: Hymenochaetales
- Family: Hymenochaetaceae
- Genus: Onnia; P. Karst

Type species
- Onnia circinata (Fr.) P. Karst

= Onnia (fungus) =

Genus of fungi

Onnia is a genus of fungi in the family Hymenochaetaceae. The widely distributed genus contains five species.

The genus name of Onnia is in honour of Onni Alexander Karsten (1868-1958), who was a Finnish gardener, who worked at the Mustiala Agriculture Institute in Tampere.

Onni Alexander Karsten was also the son of Petter Adolf Karsten and the genus was circumscribed by Petter Adolf Karsten in Bidrag Kännedom Finlands Natur Folk vol.48 on pages 326 - 376 in 1889.

== Species list ==
- Onnia circinata
- Onnia incisa
- Onnia musashiensis
- Onnia orientalis
- Onnia scaura
- Onnia tomentosa
- Onnia subtriquetra
