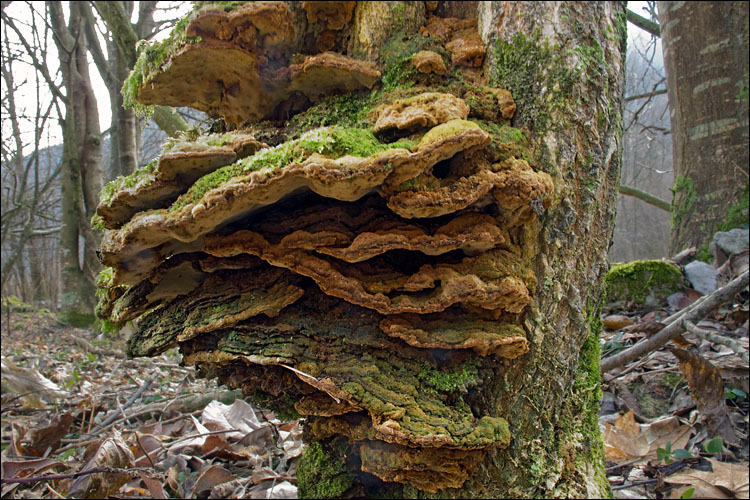
- Phylloporia ribis

Scientific classification
- Kingdom: Fungi
- Division: Basidiomycota
- Class: Agaricomycetes
- Order: Hymenochaetales
- Family: Hymenochaetaceae
- Genus: Phylloporia; Murrill (1904)

Type species
- Phylloporia parasitica Murrill (1904)

= Phylloporia (fungus) =

Genus of fungi

Phylloporia is a genus of polypore fungi in the family Hymenochaetaceae. A 2012 estimate placed 23 species in the genus; this number was increased to 30 by 2015.

== Species ==
- Phylloporia afrospathulata Yombiyeni & Decock 2015 – Gabon
- Phylloporia ampelina (Bondartsev & Singer) Bondartseva 1983
- Phylloporia bibulosa (Lloyd) Ryvarden 1972 – East Africa
- Phylloporia capucina (Mont.) Ryvarden 1982
- Phylloporia chrysites (Berk.) Ryvarden 1972 – Africa; Puerto Rico; South America
- Phylloporia clausenae – China
- Phylloporia crataegi L.W.Zhou & Y.C.Dai 2012 – northeastern China
- Phylloporia cylindrispora – China
- Phylloporia dependens Y.C.Dai 2015
- Phylloporia ephedrae (Woron.) Parmasto 1985
- Phylloporia fontanesiae L.W.Zhou & Y.C.Dai 2012 – China
- Phylloporia flacourtiae – China
- Phylloporia fruticum (Berk. & M.A.Curtis) Ryvarden 1972 – Africa; Cuba; southeast Asia; South America
- Phylloporia fulva Yombiyeni & Decock – northwestern Gabon
- Phylloporia gutta L.W.Zhou & Y.C.Dai 2012 – China
- Phylloporia hainaniana Y.C.Dai & B.K.Cui 2010
- Phylloporia homocarnica – China
- Phylloporia minutispora Ipulet & Ryvarden 2005 – Uganda
- Phylloporia nandinae L.W.Zhou & Y.C.Dai 2012 – China
- Phylloporia nouraguensis Decock & Castillo 2013 – French Guiana
- Phylloporia oblongospora Y.C.Dai & H.S.Yuan 2010 – China
- Phylloporia oreophila L.W.Zhou & Y.C.Dai 2012 – China
- Phylloporia osmanthi L.W.Zhou 2014 – South China
- Phylloporia parasitica Murrill 1904 – South America
- Phylloporia pectinata (Klotzsch) Ryvarden 1991 – New South Wales; Philippines; Malaysia
- Phylloporia pulla (Mont. & Berk.) Decock & Yombiyeni – Indonesia
- Phylloporia resupinata Douanla-Meli & Ryvarden 2007 – Cameroon
- Phylloporia ribis (Schumach.) Ryvarden 1978 – Europe
- Phylloporia rzedowskii R.Valenz. & Decock 2011 – Mexico
- Phylloporia spathulata (Hook.) Ryvarden 1991 – central Africa; South America; Philippines
- Phylloporia terrestris L.W.Zhou 2014 – South China
- Phylloporia tiliae L.W.Zhou 2013 – China
- Phylloporia ulloai R.Valenz., Raymundo, Cifuentes & Decock 2011 – Mexico
- Phylloporia verae-crucis (Berk. ex Sacc.) Ryvarden 1991
- Phylloporia yuchengia Yu.Sh.Gafforov, Tomovsk, E.Langer & L.W.Zhou 2014 – Uzbekistan
- Phylloporia weberiana
