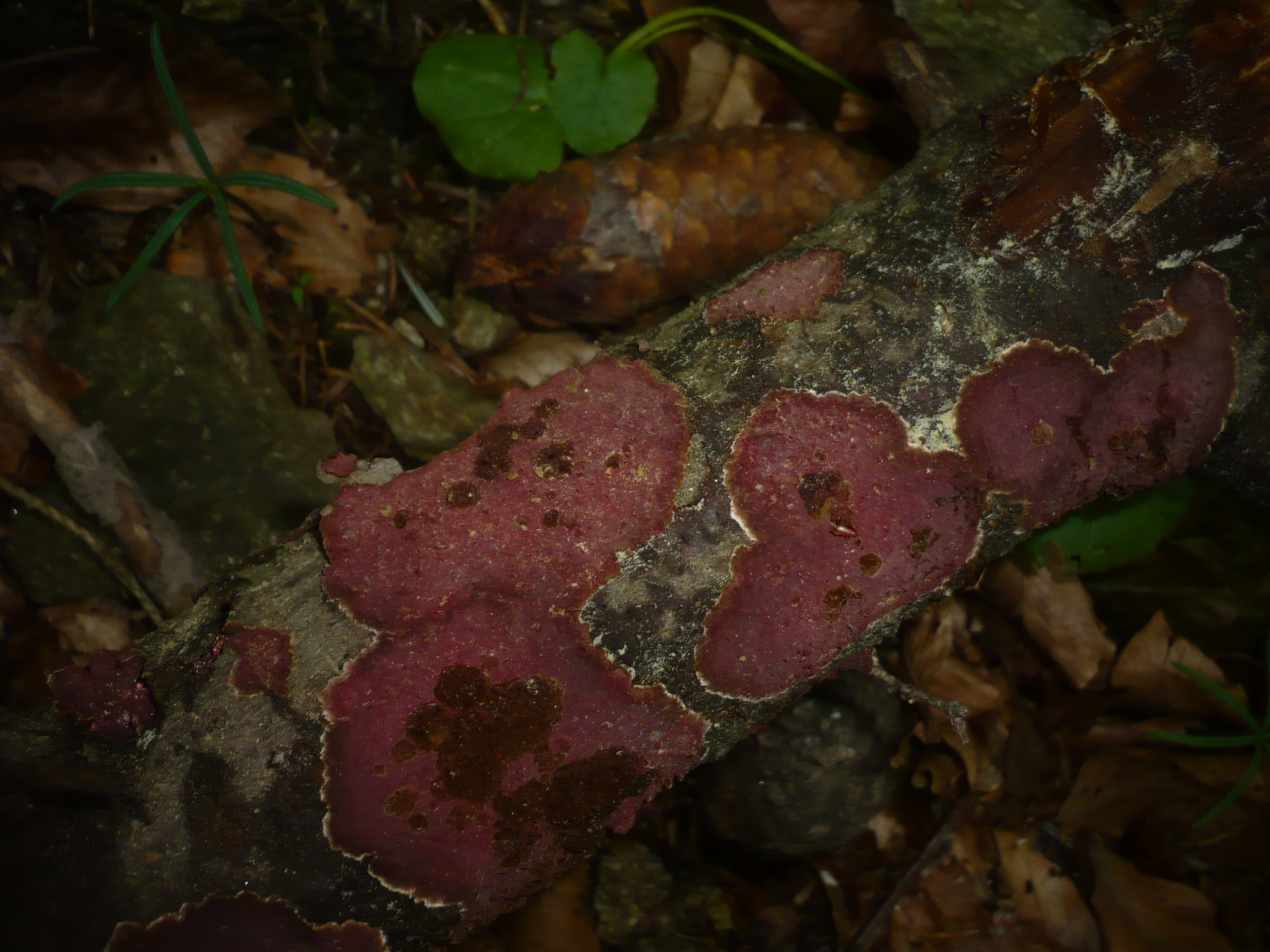
- Hymenochaete cruenta

Scientific classification
- Kingdom: Fungi
- Division: Basidiomycota
- Class: Agaricomycetes
- Order: Hymenochaetales
- Family: Hymenochaetaceae; Donk (1948)

Type genus
- Hymenochaete Lév. (1846)

Genera
- See text

Synonyms
- Coltriciaceae; Inonotaceae; Tubulicrinaceae

= Hymenochaetaceae =

Hymenochaetaceae Temporal range: Barremian–Present

Family of fungi

The Hymenochaetaceae are a family of fungi in the order Hymenochaetales. The family contains several species that are implicated in many diseases of broad-leaved and coniferous trees, causing heart rot, canker and root diseases, and also esca disease of grapevines.

== Genera ==
The following genera are recognised in the family Hymenochaetaceae:

- †Appianoporites (Eocene)
- Arambarria Rajchenb. & Pildain
- Asterodon Pat.
- Aurificaria D.A.Reid
- Botryodontia (Hjortstam & Ryvarden) Hjortstam
- Clavariachaete Corner
- Coltricia Gray
- Coltriciella Murrill
- Coniferiporia L.W.Zhou & Y.C.Dai, 2016
- Cyclomyces Kunze ex Fr.
- Cylindrosporus L.W.Zhou, 2015
- Deviodontia (Parmasto) Hjortstam & Ryvarden
- Dichochaete Parmasto
- Erythromyces Hjortstam & Ryvarden
- Fomitiporella Murrill
- Fomitiporia Murrill
- Fulvifomes Murrill
- Fulvoderma L.W.Zhou & Y.C.Dai, 2018
- Fuscoporella
- Fuscoporia Murrill
- Hastodontia (Parmasto) Hjortstam & Ryvarden
- Hydnochaete Bres.
- Hydnoporia Murrill, 1907
- Hymenochaete Lév., 1846
- Hymenochaetopsis S.H.He & Jiao Yang
- Inocutis Fiasson & Niemelä
- Inonotopsis Parmasto
- Inonotus P.Karst., 1879
- Meganotus Y.C.Dai, F.Wu, L.W.Zhou, J.Vlasák & B.K.Cui, 2022
- Mensularia Lázaro Ibiza
- Mucronoporus Ellis & Everh., 1889
- Neomensularia F.Wu, L.W.Zhou & Y.C.Dai, 2016
- Neophellinus Y.C.Dai, F.Wu, L.W.Zhou, J.Vlasák & B.K.Cui, 2022
- Nothonotus Y.C.Dai, F.Wu, L.W.Zhou, J.Vlasák & B.K.Cui, 2022
- Nothophellinus Rajchenb., 2015
- Ochroporus J.Schröt., 1888
- Ochrosporellus J.Schröt., 1888
- Onnia P.Karst.
- Pachynotus Y.C.Dai, F.Wu, L.W.Zhou, J.Vlasák & B.K.Cui, 2022
- Pelloporus Quél.
- Perenninotus Y.C.Dai, F.Wu, L.W.Zhou, J.Vlasák & B.K.Cui, 2022
- Phaeohydnochaete Lloyd, 1916
- Phellinidium (Kotl.) Fiasson & Niemelä
- Phellinopsis Y.C.Dai
- Phellinotus Drechsler-Santos, Robledo & Rajchenb.
- Phellinus Quél., 1886
- Phellopilus Niemelä, T.Wagner & M.Fisch.
- Phylloporia Murrill
- Polystictus Fr., 1851
- Porodaedalea Murrill
- Pseudochaete
- Pseudoinonotus T.Wagner & M.Fisch.
- Pseudophylloporia Y.C.Dai, F.Wu, L.W.Zhou & B.K.Cui, 2022
- Pyrrhoderma Imazeki
- †Quatsinoporites (Late Cretaceous)
- Rajchenbergia Salvador-Montoya, Popoff & Drechsler-Santos
- Rigidonotus Y.C.Dai, F.Wu, L.W.Zhou, J.Vlasák & B.K.Cui, 2022
- Sanghuangporus Sheng H.Wu, L.W.Zhou & Y.C.Dai, 2015
- Sclerotus Xavier de Lima
- Stipitochaete Ryvarden
- Subulicium Hjortstam & Ryvarden
- Tropicoporus L.W.Zhou et al.
- Tubulicrinis Donk
- Xanthochrous Pat.
- Xanthoporia Murrill
