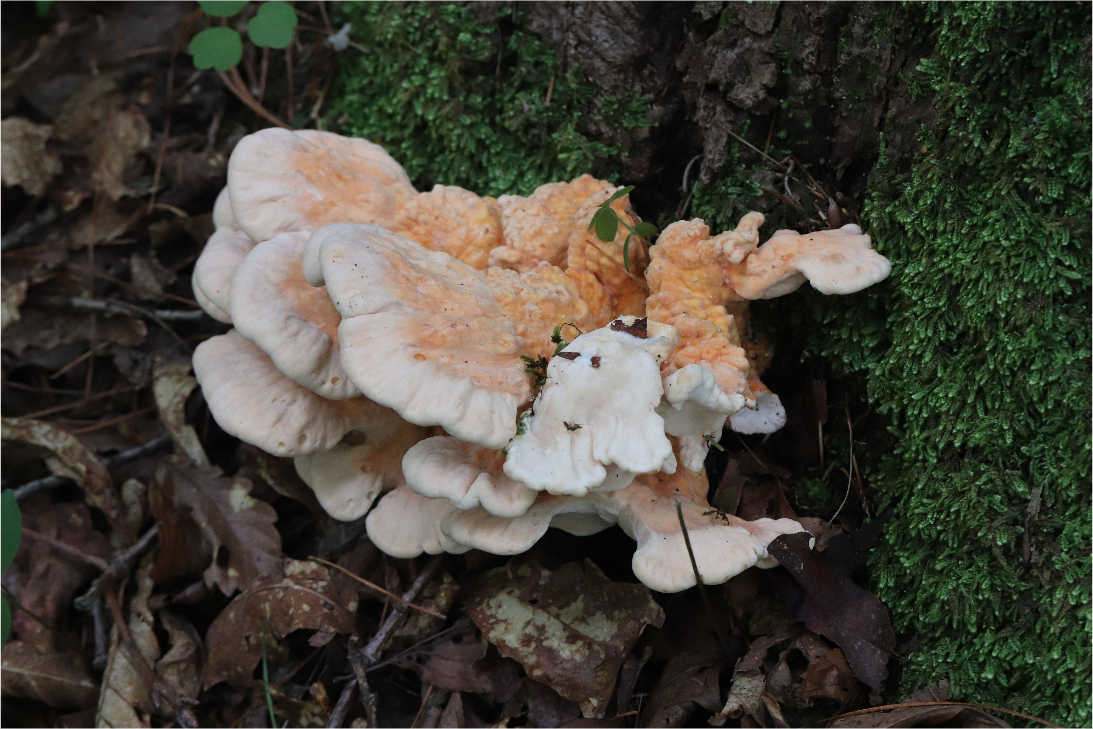

Scientific classification
- Kingdom: Fungi
- Division: Basidiomycota
- Class: Agaricomycetes
- Order: Polyporales
- Family: Laetiporaceae
- Genus: Laetiporus
- Species: L. cremeiporus

Binomial name
- Laetiporus cremeiporus Y.Ota & T.Hatt. (2010)

= Laetiporus cremeiporus =

Species of fungus

Laetiporus cremeiporus is a species of polypore fungus in the family Fomitopsidaceae. It is found in cooler temperate areas of China and Japan, where it grows on logs and stumps of hardwood trees, especially oak. The fruit body of the fungus comprises large masses of overlapping reddish-orange caps with a cream-colored pore surface on the underside.

== Taxonomy ==
The fungus was described as new to science in 2010 by Japanese mycologists Yuko Ota and Tsutomu Hattori. The type collection was made on Mount Kurikoma, in Miyagi Prefecture, Japan, where the fungus was found fruiting on a trunk of oak. Molecular analysis of DNA sequences confirmed that the taxon is a unique species within the genus Laetiporus. The specific epithet cremeiporus refers to the cream-colored pores on the cap underside.

== Description ==
The fruit body of the fungus comprises overlapping light orange to reddish-orange fan-shaped plates that individually measure up to 24 cm (9.4 in) wide by 32 cm (13 in) long. Collectively, the entire fruit body can reach a size of 50 cm (20 in) or more. The color of the caps fades to pale brown in age. The pore surface on the cap underside are yellowish-white to cream colored initially, sometimes becoming pinkish in age. Pores are small, numbering two to four per millimeter; they are circular at first but become more angular as the fruit body matures. The flesh has a mild taste and an unpleasant odor that the authors liken to "garbage".

Spores are egg-shaped to ellipsoid, measuring 15–20 by 5–8 μm. Basidia (spore-bearing cells) are club-shaped with two to four sterigmata, and measure 15–20 by 5–8 μm.

== Habitat and distribution ==
Laetiporus cremeiporus is found in cool and temperate areas of China and Japan, where it grows on stumps and logs of hardwood trees, usually oak.

== Research on chemical constituents ==
Antioxidant inaoside A

Laetiporus cremeiporus has been used in traditional medicines, and has been researched for its pharmacological activity. Phytochemicals include bioactive compounds such as phenolic compound inaoside A, nicotinamide, adenosine, and 5′-S-methyl-5′-thioadenosine. Inaoside A exhibited DPPH radical scavenging activity as a monophenolic compound with a IC_{50} of 79.9 μM. The Trolox equivalent antioxidant capacity value was 0.36.

Other compounds were isolated, including multiple sterols and acids: ergosterol peroxide, fomefficinic acid A, ergosta‐7,22-dien‐3β‐ol, cerevisterol, sulphurenic acid, 4E,8E‐N‐D‐2′‐hydroxypalmitoyl‐1‐O‐β‐D‐glycopyranosyl‐9‐methyl‐4,8‐sphingadienine, ergosterol, N‐2′‐hydroxytetracosyl‐1,3,4‐trihydroxy‐2‐amino‐octadecane, nicotinic acid, and eburicoic acid.
