= Penicillium brasilianum =

Scientific classification
- Kingdom: Fungi
- Division: Ascomycota
- Class: Eurotiomycetes
- Order: Eurotiales
- Family: Aspergillaceae
- Genus: Penicillium
- Species: P. brasilianum

Binomial name
- Penicillium brasilianum Bat.

Type strain
- ATCC 12072, CBS 253.55, FRR 3466, QM 6947

Synonyms
- Penicillium paraherquei, Penicillium ochrochloron var. paraherquei

Species of fungus

Penicillium brasilianum is a fungus species of the genus of Penicillium. Penicillium brasilianum produces the compounds isoroquefortine C, griseofulvin, ergosterol peroxide, 3β-hydroxy-(22E,24R)-ergosta-5,8,22-trien-7-one, cerevisterol, (22E,24R)-6β-methoxyergosta-7,22-diene-3β,5α-diol.

== See also ==
- List of Penicillium species
