= Meshimakobu =

East Asian mushroom

External image
- Mature Sanghuangporus sanghuang mushrooms on a tree

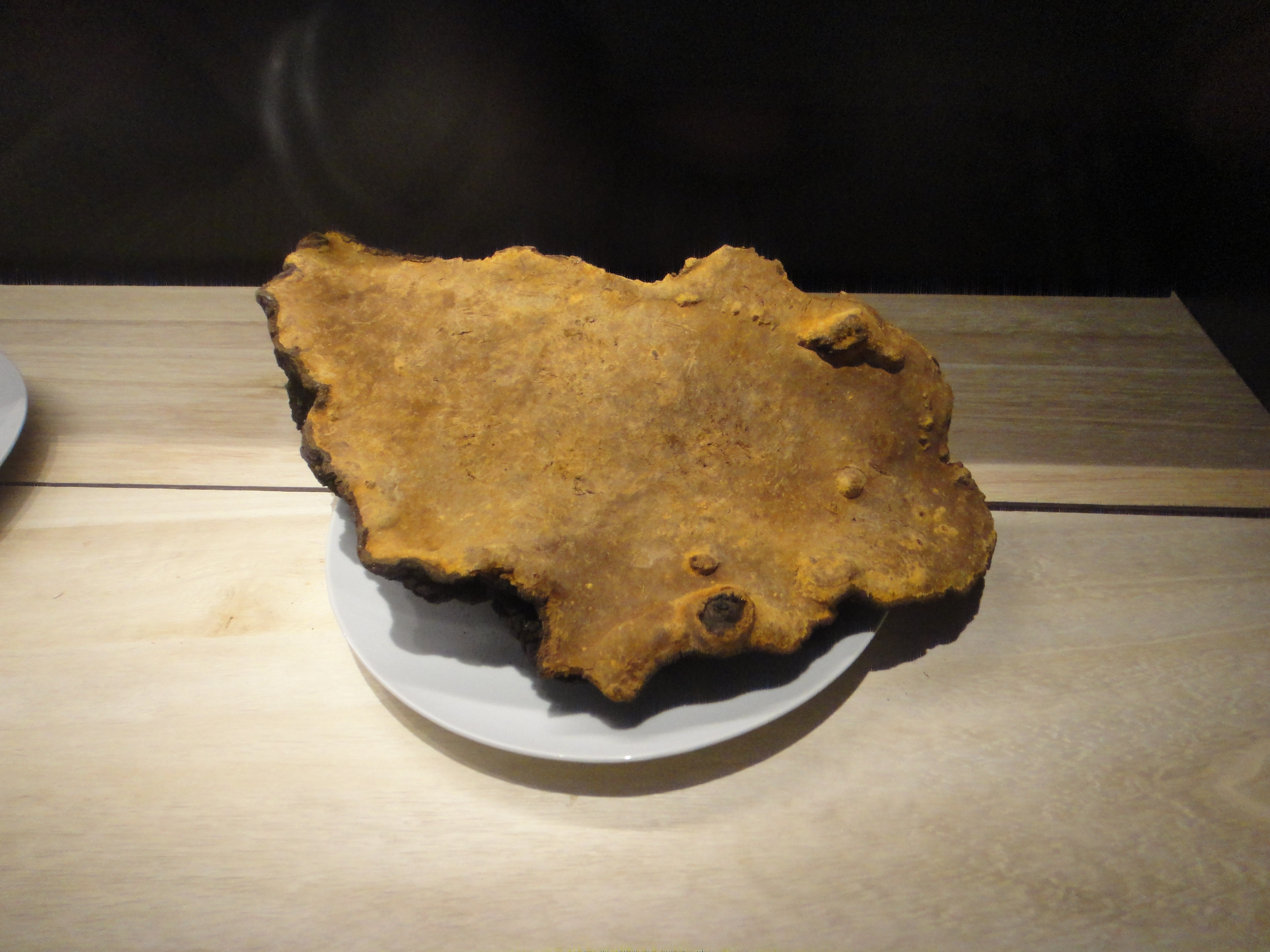
Sanghuangporus sanghuang specimen

Meshimakobu (Note: Japanese: メシマコブ; Revised Hepburn: meshimakobu; Nihon-shiki: mesimakobu) and sanghuang / sanghwang, (Note: Chinese: 桑黃 (trad.) / 桑黄 (simp.); pinyin: sānghuáng Korean: 상황 / 상황버섯; Revised Romanization: sanghwang / sanghwangbeoseot) also known as mesima (English) or black hoof mushroom (American English), is a mushroom in East Asia.

== Understanding of the concept ==
=== Etymology and association with mulberry ===
The Japanese name メシマコブ is composed of メシマ, an island of Gotō, Nagasaki, where this mushroom used to grow, and コブ, which means bump, referring to the mushroom's appearance. Per Wu et al. (2012) citing Ito (1955) and Imazeki and Hongo (1989), this is a mushroom that is always said to be on mulberry trees.

The Chinese name 桑黃 / 桑黄 is composed of 桑 ("mulberry tree") and 黃 / 黄 ("yellow"). The Korean name 상황 is from Chinese.

=== Historical records ===
The earliest attestation of the name 桑黃 is in Yaoxing Lun.

Various Chinese historical records documented Xinzhou sanghuang (信州桑黃), in which Xinzhou is a place name in modern-day Jiangxi. It was depicted with hair-like objects, apparently describing Inonotus hispidus.

=== Folk understandings ===
In Tonghua, Jilin, various mushrooms were seen as sanghuang by the locals, where it was used to treat cancer and stomach illnesses. The report described the mushrooms and attached photos, but didn't identify them by Latin names.

== Associated taxa ==
=== Phellinus linteus ===
It had been long thought that this mushroom is Phellinus linteus, which is a view whose earlier iteration, that this mushroom is Phellinus yucatanensis, can be traced back to Japanese academic literacies in early 20th century based on specimens identified as Fomes yucatanensis, later deemed a synonym of P. linteus.

Polyporus linteus is a species named by Miles Joseph Berkeley and Moses Ashley Curtis in 1860 with the specimen from Nicaragua. Shu Chün Teng in 1963 renamed it Phellinus linteus.

Dai and Xu (1998) studied specimens from various East Asian regions, and found them morphologically different from American Phellinus linteus; the study concluded that Phellinus linteus is not found in East Asia. The study deemed Phellinus linteus exist in tropical America with specimens from there, and Africa with the type specimen of Xanthochrous rudis.

Zhou et al. (2015) examined two African specimens that morphologically fit X. rudis, and their sequences formed a distinct clade from P. linteus. Hence, X. rudis regained standalone taxon status and was renamed Tropicoporus rudis. And Phellinus linteus, now Tropicoporus linteus, is a tropical American species.

Phellinstatin is an enoyl-ACP reductase inhibitor isolated from the Phellinus linteus in East Asia.

=== Phellinus igniarius ===
Liu (1974) treated Phellinus igniarius as sanghuang.

=== Sanghuangporus baumii ===
Phellinus baumii was the name for this mushroom seen in Dai and Xu (1998). Phellinus baumii is known as Sanghuangporus baumii from 2015 on.

=== Sanghuangporus vaninii ===
Xie et al. (2010) inspected sanghuang strains from various institutions with molecular methods, whose test results were analyzed by Wu et al. (2012) to contain Inonotus vaninii (formerly Phellinus vaninii). This mushroom is from 2015 known as Sanghuangporus vaninii.

=== Sanghuangporus sanghuang ===
Inonotus sanghuang was seen as this mushroom in Wu et al. (2012). It only grows on mulberry trees. (Note: Wu and Dai (2020) stated that S. sanghuang grows only on Morus australis and occasionally domestic mulberries, chiefly Morus alba trees. Fang et al. (2022) disagreed, said that Wu and Dai (2020) mistakenly assumed the relationship between palmately divided leaves and Morus australis, and stated that S. sanghuang is so far known growing only on Morus mongolica and Morus mongolica var. diabolica.) It was renamed Sanghuangporus sanghuang in 2015.

=== Inonotus hispidus ===
Inonotus hispidus was seen as sanghuang in Bao et al. (2017). I. hispidus grows on various broad-leaf trees, including mulberry trees.

== Folk medicine ==
There is insufficient evidence from clinical studies to indicate its use as a prescription drug to treat cancer or any disease.

In Asian folk medicine, the mushroom is prepared as a tea. Its processed mycelium may be sold as a dietary supplement in the form of capsules, pills or powder.

== See also ==
- Medicinal fungi
