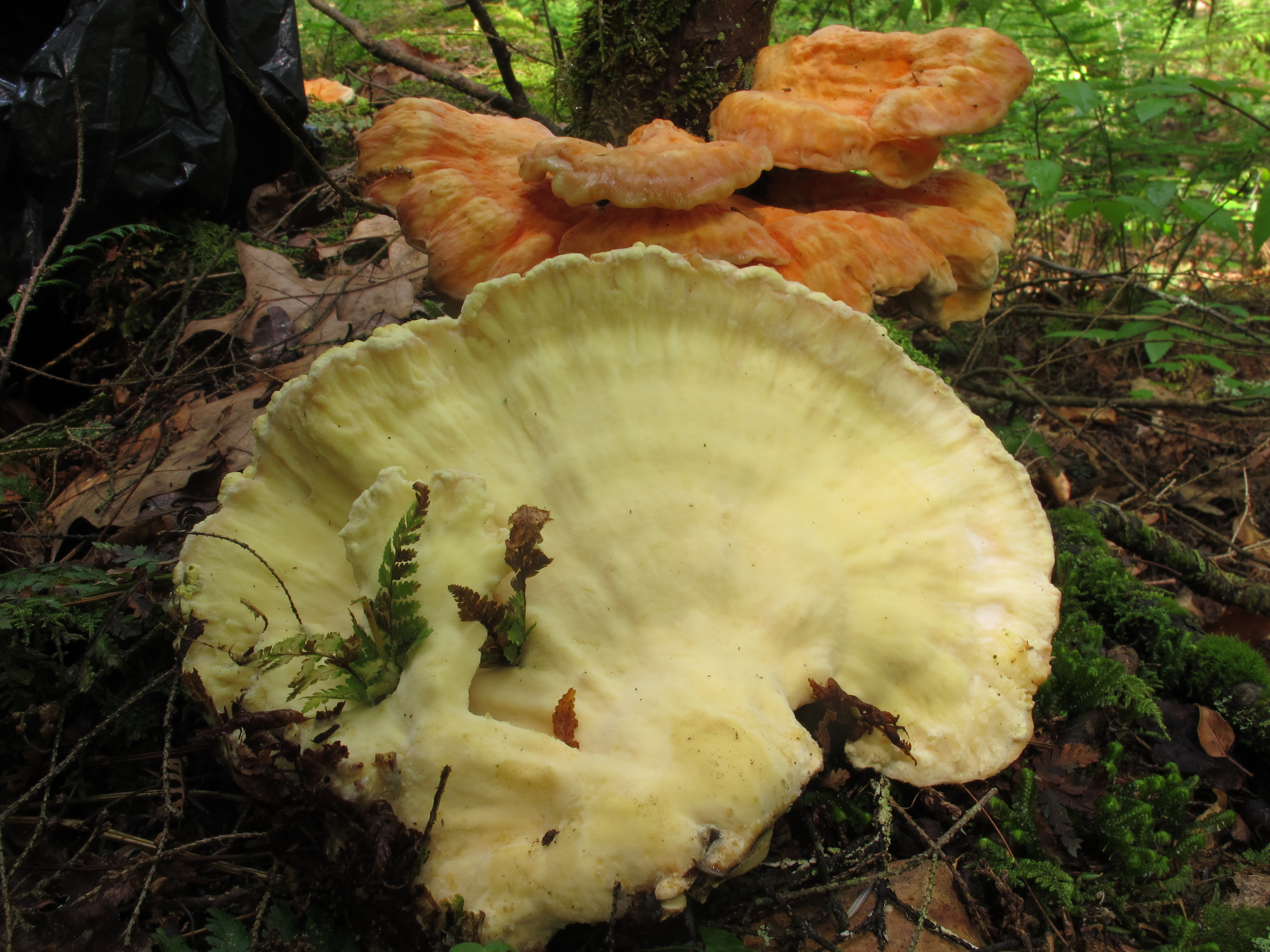

Scientific classification
- Domain: Eukaryota
- Kingdom: Fungi
- Division: Basidiomycota
- Class: Agaricomycetes
- Order: Polyporales
- Family: Laetiporaceae
- Genus: Laetiporus
- Species: L. huroniensis

Binomial name
- Laetiporus huroniensis Burds. & Banik (2001)

= Laetiporus huroniensis =

Species of fungus

Laetiporus huroniensis is a species of polypore fungus in the family Fomitopsidaceae. It is found in the Great Lakes region of eastern North America, where it fruits on large logs in old growth conifer forests. The type collection, made in Ottawa National Forest in September 1999, was found fruiting on Tsuga canadensis. It was one of three new Laetiporus species published in 2001, which were distinguished genetically from the widespread Laetiporus sulphureus; the others were L. conifericola and L. gilbertsonii.
