= Inoscavin =

Class of chemical compound

Inoscavins are chemical compounds isolated from Phellinus linteus.

== See also ==
- Inoscavin A
