= C28H44O3 =

The molecular formula C_{28}H_{44}O_{3} (molar mass: 428.65 g/mol) may refer to:

- Ergosterol peroxide, a steroid derivative
- Nandrolone decanoate, an androgen and anabolic steroid medication
