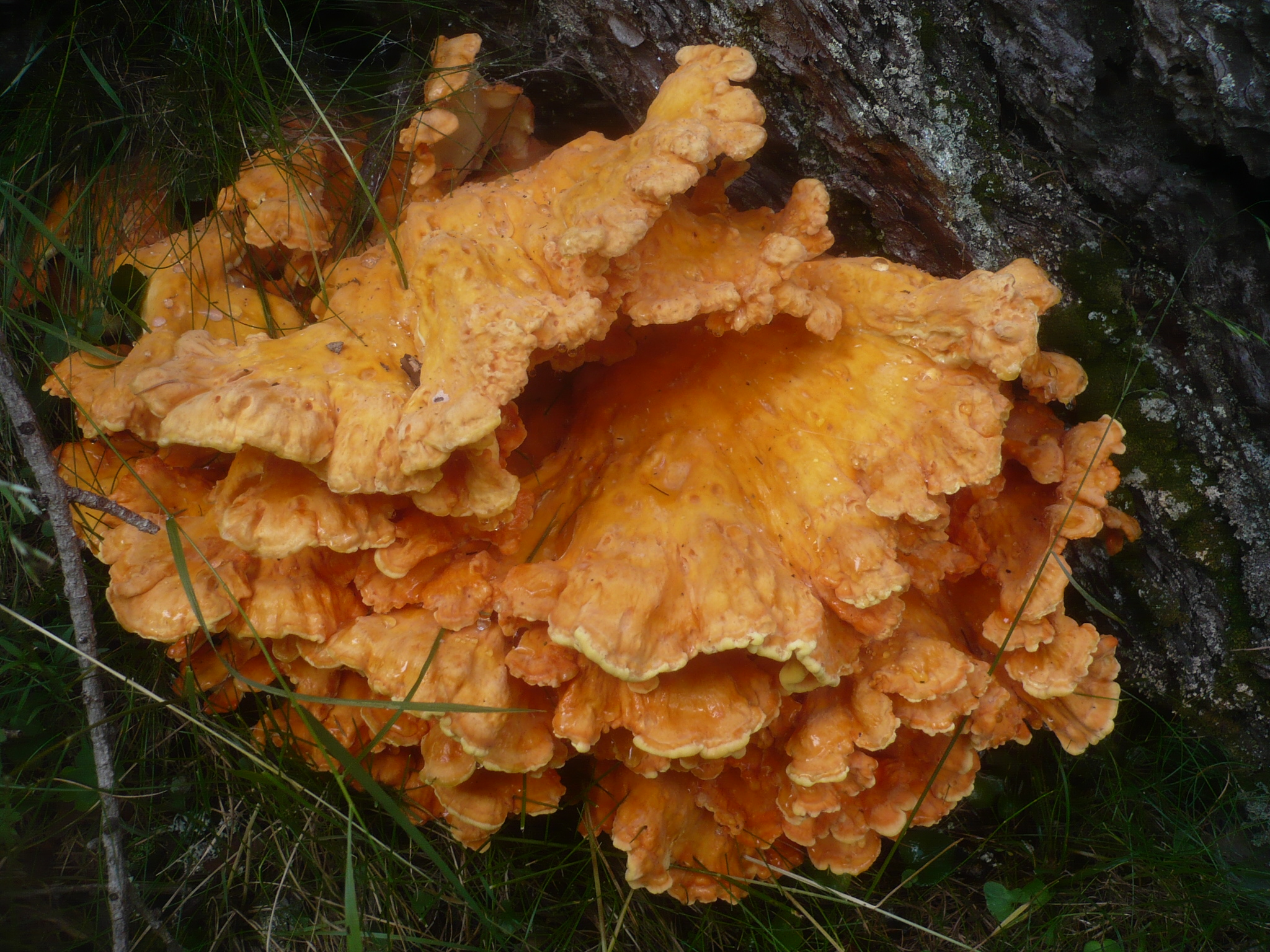
- In Carinthia, Austria

Scientific classification
- Domain: Eukaryota
- Kingdom: Fungi
- Division: Basidiomycota
- Class: Agaricomycetes
- Order: Polyporales
- Family: Laetiporaceae
- Genus: Laetiporus
- Species: L. montanus

Binomial name
- Laetiporus montanus Cerný ex Tomsovský & Jankovský (2009)

= Laetiporus montanus =

Species of fungus

Laetiporus montanus is a species of polypore fungus in the family Fomitopsidaceae. It is found in mountainous areas of central Europe and in China, where it grows on conifers.

== Taxonomy ==
Laetiporus montanus was first described as new to science by Czech mycologist Karel Černý in 1989. However, the publication did not include a Latin description of the species, nor did it indicate the type, so the name was invalid according to nomenclatural rules. Michal Tomšovský and Libor Jankovský published the species validly in 2009. Although the fruit body of L. montanus is morphologically indistinguishable from the widespread L. sulphureus, it is distinct genetically.

== Description ==
Fruitbodies consist of overlapping fan-shaped caps up to 30 cm (12 in) wide and 1–3 cm (0.4–1.2 in) thick. The upper surface of the fruit body is bright orange before fading to light brownish in age. The pores on the cap underside are initially bright yellow, but fade to pale tan. Pores are small, measuring 1 to 4 per millimetre. Spores are egg-shaped, hyaline (translucent), and measure 6.0–8.0 μm. It has larger spores than other European Laetiporus species; for example, spores of L. sulphureus typically do not exceed 7.0 μm in length.

== Habitat, distribution, and ecology ==
Like all Laetiporus species, L. montanus causes a brown rot in its host trees. It grows on mature conifers, particularly Picea abies and Larix decidua. In Europe, the fungus has been recorded from the Czech Republic, Slovakia, and Austria. In 2010, it was reported from the Inner Mongolia Autonomous Region, the first record from China. The actual distribution of the fungus is not well known; the authors suspect that it may have a wider distribution, including Switzerland and adjacent mountainous countries. It is restricted to elevations above 1,100 m (3,600 ft).

Insects known to rear their young in the fruit bodies of L. montanus include the Dipteran species Ula bolitophila and Spelobia parapusio.
