= Piptoporellus baudonii =

Scientific classification
- Kingdom: Fungi
- Division: Basidiomycota
- Class: Agaricomycetes
- Order: Polyporales
- Family: Laetiporaceae
- Genus: Laetiporus
- Species: L. baudonii

Binomial name
- Laetiporus baudonii (Pat.) Ryvarden (1991)

Species of fungus

Piptoporellus baudonii is a species of poroid bracket fungus in the family Fomitopsidaceae, occurring in tropical Africa and growing on woody hosts, where it acts as a plant pathogen and wood-decaying fungus causing brown rot. It produces shelf-like basidiocarps with a poroid underside and has been recorded on a range of tree species in African forests and plantations.

In 2020, based on molecular phylogenetic analyses and morphological evidence, the species was transferred from Laetiporus to Piptoporellus, with the study showing that it is distinct from Laetiporus sensu stricto while remaining within a related lineage of polypores in the broader Antrodia clade. Phylogenetic results place it among other wood-decay fungi within Piptoporellus and allied genera, which include taxa related to the “chicken of the woods” complex, although it is not closely congeneric with Laetiporus sulphureus.

The species is relatively poorly studied, and its biochemical and ecological properties remain incompletely characterized.
