= Calle José Ortega y Gasset =

Street in Madrid, Spain

José Ortega y Gasset Street
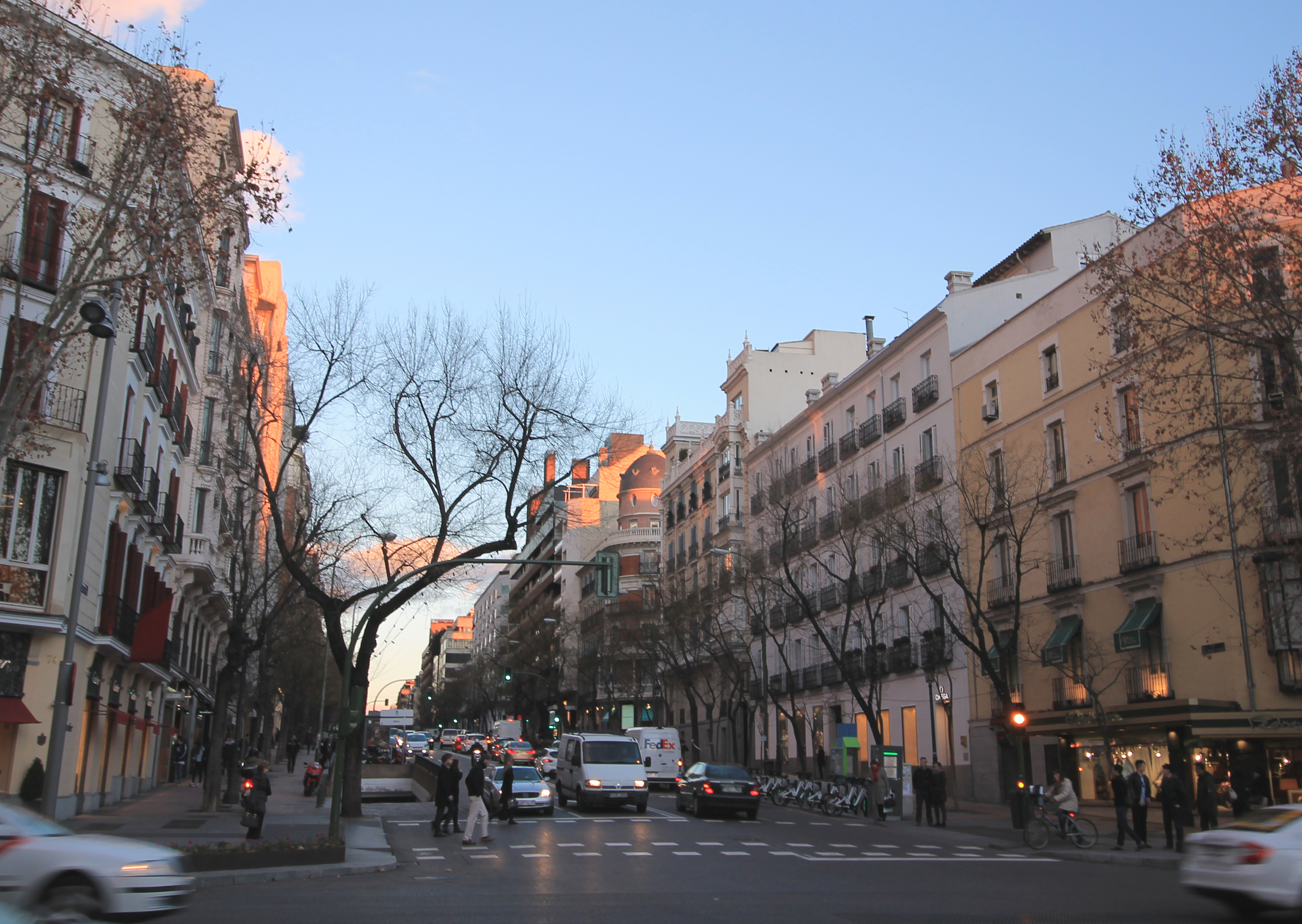
- José Ortega y Gasset Street during winter.
- Interactive map of José Ortega y Gasset Street
- Native name: Calle de José Ortega y Gasset (Spanish)
- Former name: Calle de Lista
- Length: 1,568 km (974 mi)
- Postal code: 28006

Calle de José Ortega y Gasset, also known by its previous name, Calle de Lista, or simply Calle Ortega y Gasset, is a major street located in the Barrio de Lista, Madrid, Spain in its district of Salamanca.

== Description ==
The street goes from the Paseo de la Castellana until it ends at the Calle Francisco Silvela. It also includes Marqués de Salamanca Square.

There are a total of 1449 dwellings in the street. The street is sometimes called the "Milla Dorada", the Golden Mile, referencing the luxury in this street, frequently citing stores of sporting goods, telecommunications, and food. It has gradually declined as of 2019, as some luxury brands have withdrawn from this street.

One of the buildings at the street is the Edificio Beatriz.

== History ==
In 1871, the street was given the name of Calle de Lista in honor of the poet and priest Alberto Lista y Aragón, the director of the Gaceta de Madrid. After the death of the Spanish philosopher José Ortega y Gasset in 1955, the street was renamed with its present name in his honor.

In June 2021, the municipal government invested €5,500,000 in converting the street into more of a "green space", which included an environmental survey, with replacement of a number of trees of th street, to prevent infection by the fungus Inonotus hispidus. This reconstruction finished in September 2022. As of 2024, the street's rent value reached €190 per square metre, which was an increase of 12% compared to the previous year.

Spanish politician Francisco Silvela, the husband of the future Marquess of Silvela, lived at No. 26 between 1898 and his death in 1905. Politician and hotelier Fermín Calbetón also lived on the street; he died in 1919 at the hotel he owned at number 25.
