= Hypholomine B =

Names
- Preferred IUPAC name 2-(3,4-Dihydroxyphenyl)-6-[(1E)-2-(3,4-dihydroxyphenyl)ethen-1-yl]-3-(4-hydroxy-2-oxo-2H-pyran-6-yl)-2,3-dihydro-4H-furo[3,2-c]pyran-4-one

Identifiers
CAS Number	62350-94-1
3D model (JSmol)	Interactive image
ChEMBL	ChEMBL1682260
ChemSpider	26384083
PubChem CID	54737531
CompTox Dashboard (EPA)	DTXSID701045721
- InChI: InChI=1S/C26H18O10/c27-14-9-20(35-22(32)10-14)23-24-21(36-25(23)13-3-6-17(29)19(31)8-13)11-15(34-26(24)33)4-1-12-2-5-16(28)18(30)7-12/h1-11,23,25,27-31H/b4-1+/t23-,25+/m0/s1 Key: CGMQDMKDINCGOB-NJYVMNEESA-N
- SMILES: C1=CC(=C(C=C1/C=C/C2=CC3=C(C(C(O3)C4=CC(=C(C=C4)O)O)C5=CC(=CC(=O)O5)O)C(=O)O2)O)O

Properties
Chemical formula	C_{26}H_{18}O_{10}
Molar mass	490.420 g·mol^{−1}
- Except where otherwise noted, data are given for materials in their standard state (at 25 °C [77 °F], 100 kPa). Infobox references

Hypholomine B is a neuraminidase inhibitor isolated from the fungus Phellinus linteus.
