= Dømmesmo Oak =

Oak tree in Grimstad, Norway

Coordinates: 58.35407°N 8.57674°E

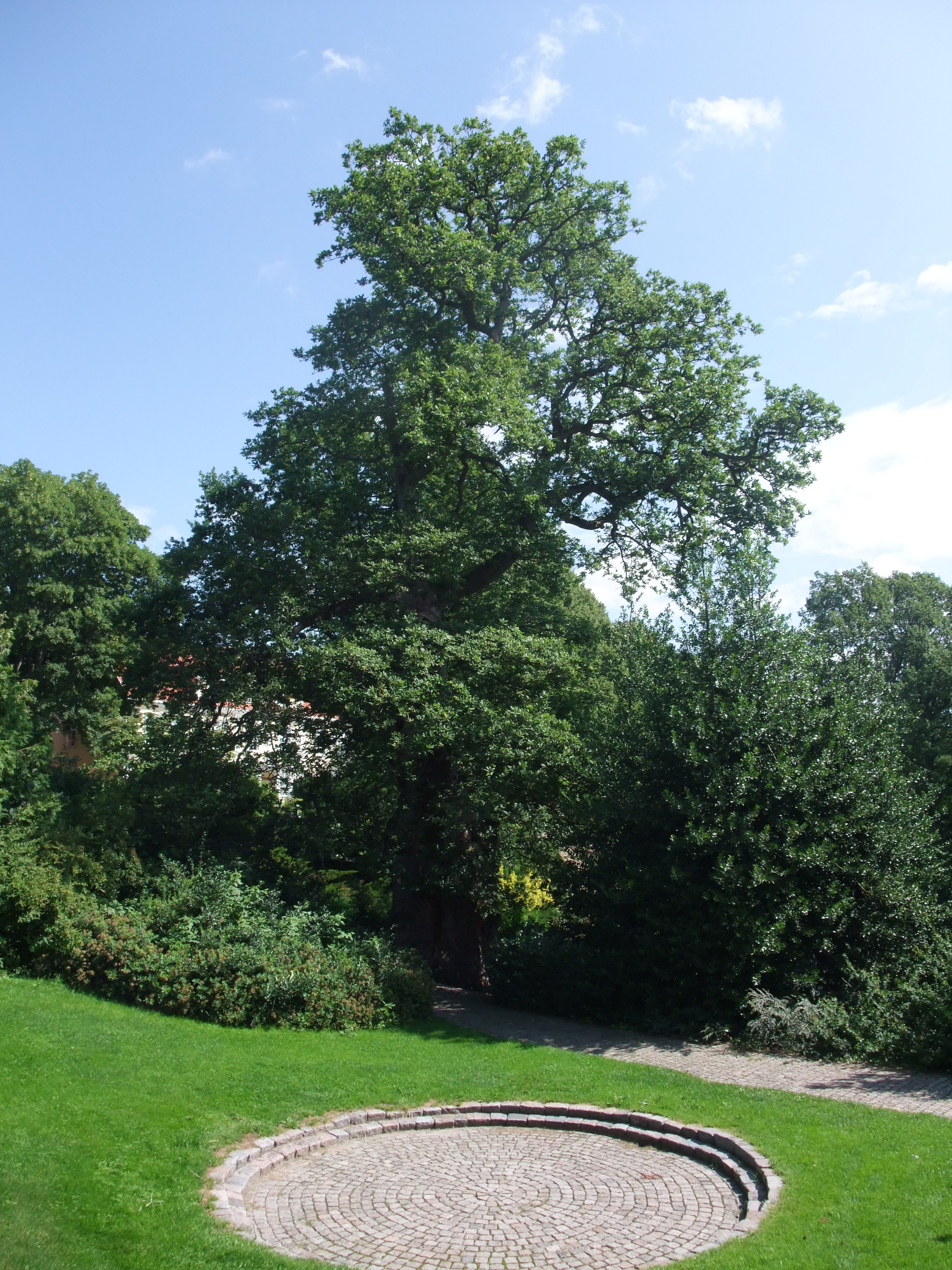
Dømmesmoeika

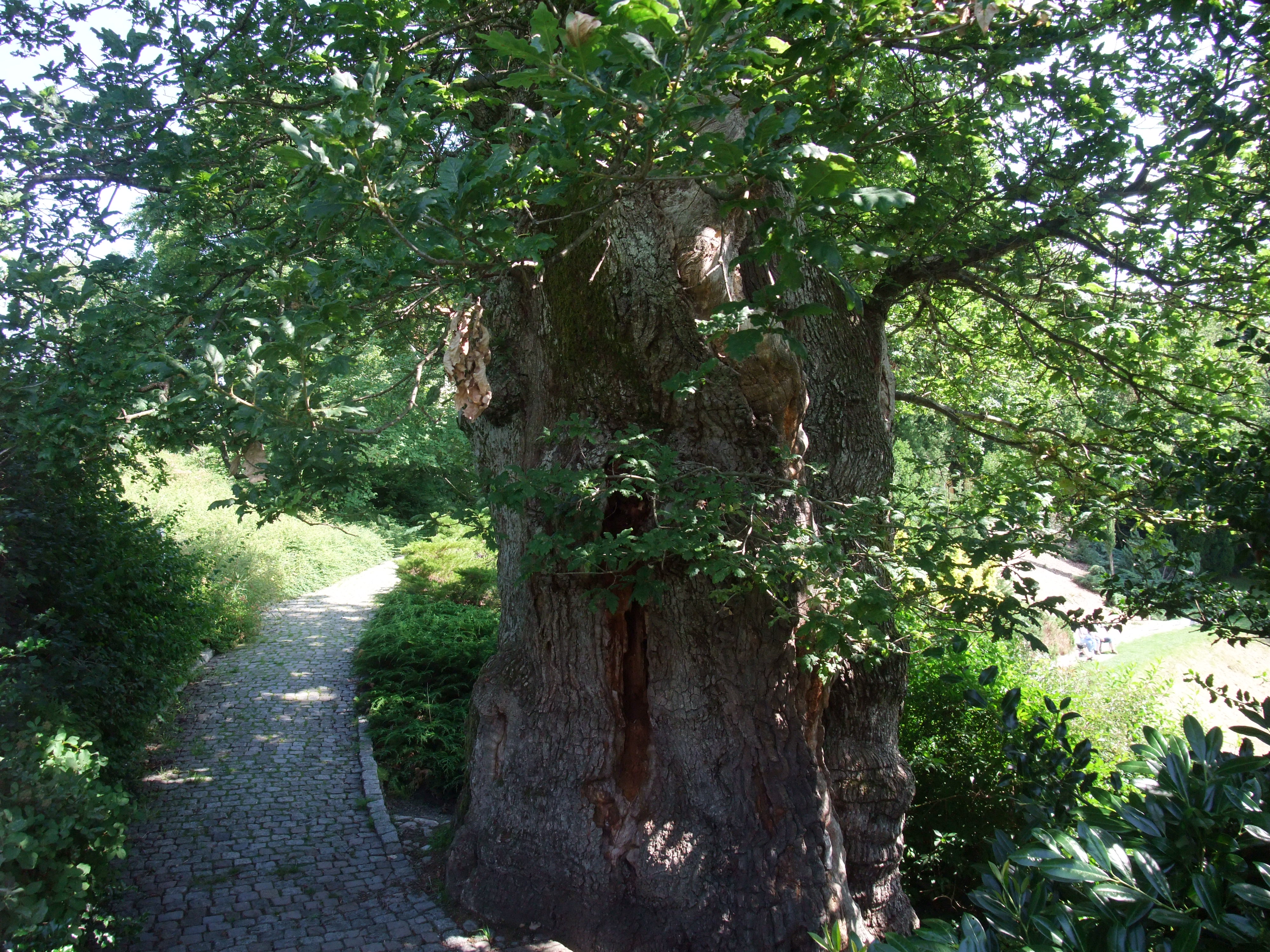
Close-up of the tree trunk

The Dømmesmo Oak (Norwegian: Dømmesmoeika) is a large oak tree that stands at Dømmesmoen park in Grimstad Municipality, Norway. A heavy snowfall in March 1985 broke several of the largest branches, and a New Year fireworks rocket ignited the tree around the year 2000. Nevertheless, the tree is still one of the most distinctive of old Norwegian trees. The oak is hollow, but the foliage is still lush and vigorous. It is estimated to be about 500 years old. The tree measures 21 metres (69 ft) high and the perimeter is at 1.3 m (4.27 ft) above the ground 7.2 m (23.62 ft).

The Dømmesmo Oak is probably a hybrid of the oak tree species Quercus robur and Quercus petraea.

The cavity is formed by Laetiporus sulphureus.

== The legend ==
A legend tells that the master thief Gjest Baardsen escaped the law enforcement authorities on one occasion by hiding inside the hollow Dømmesmo Oak, in 19th century.
