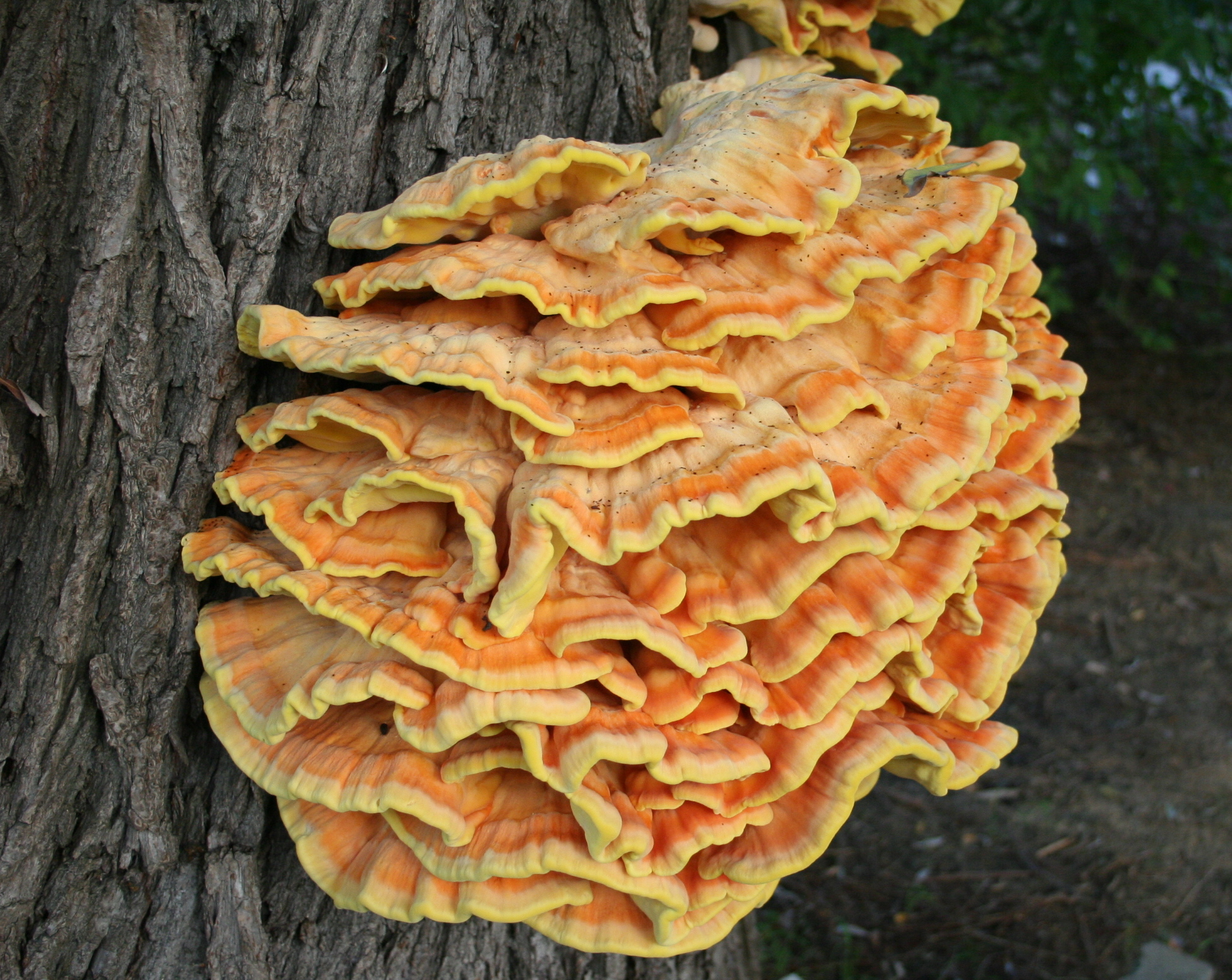
- Laetiporus sulphureus in Belgium

Scientific classification
- Kingdom: Fungi
- Division: Basidiomycota
- Class: Agaricomycetes
- Order: Polyporales
- Family: Laetiporaceae
- Genus: Laetiporus; Murr. (1904)

Type species
- Laetiporus speciosus Battarra ex Murrill (1904)

= Laetiporus =

Genus of edible mushrooms

Laetiporus is a genus of edible mushrooms found throughout much of the world. Some species, especially Laetiporus sulphureus, are commonly known as sulphur shelf, chicken of the woods, the chicken mushroom, or the chicken fungus because it is often described as tasting like and having a texture similar to that of chicken.

== Description ==
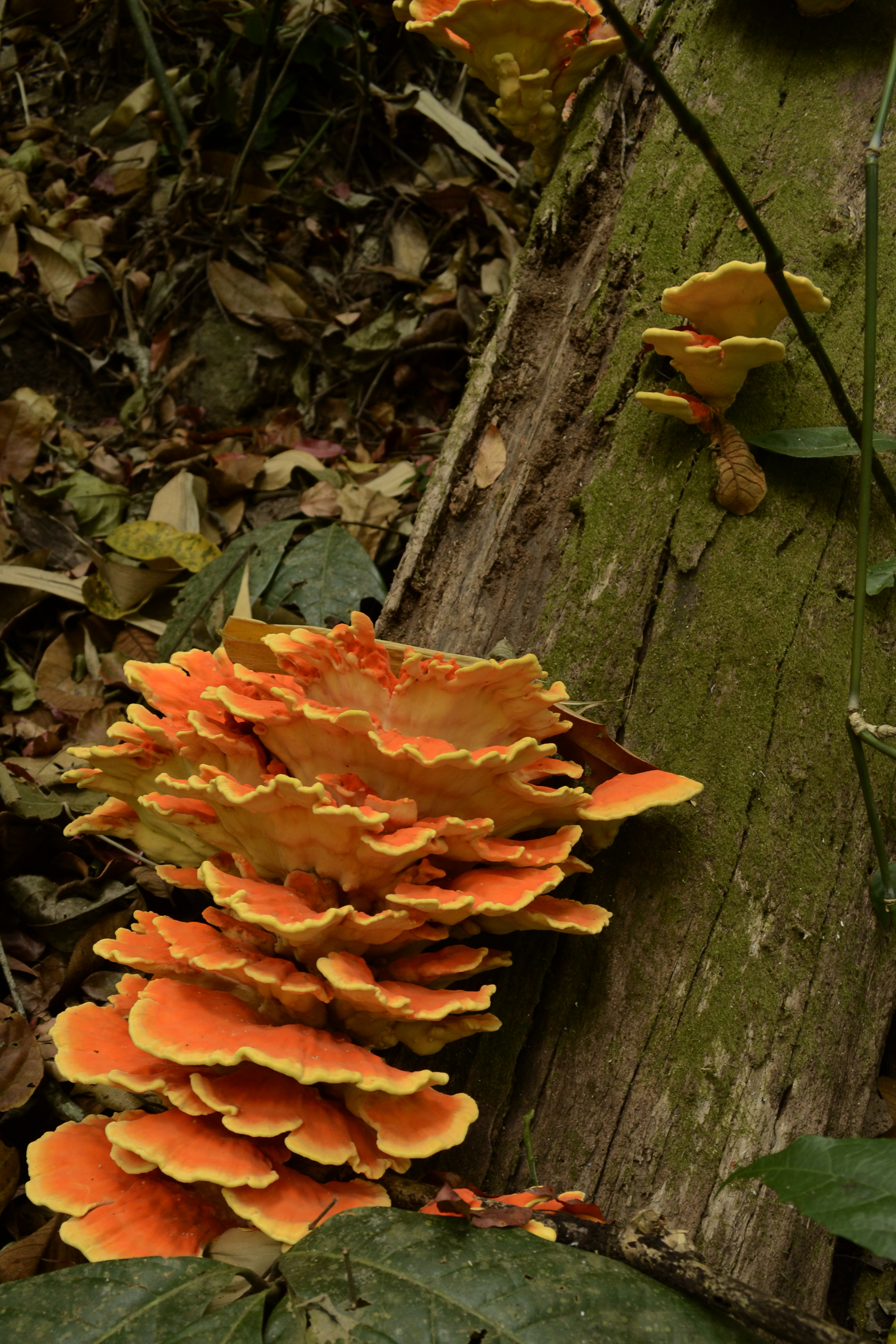
Laetiporus sp. from Anamalai Hills, Southern Western Ghats, India

Individual "shelves" range from 5 to 25 centimetres (2 to 10 inches) across. These shelves are made up of many tiny tubular filaments (hyphae). The mushroom grows in large brackets; some have been found that weigh over 45 kilograms (100 pounds).

Young fruiting bodies are characterized by a moist, rubbery, sulphur-yellow to orange body sometimes with bright orange tips. Older brackets become pale and brittle almost chalk-like, mildly pungent, and are often dotted with beetle or slug/woodlouse holes.

The name "chicken of the woods" is not to be confused with another edible polypore, Maitake (Grifola frondosa) known as "hen of the woods/rams head" or with Lyophyllum decastes, known as the "fried chicken mushroom".

== Taxonomy ==
=== Phylogeny ===
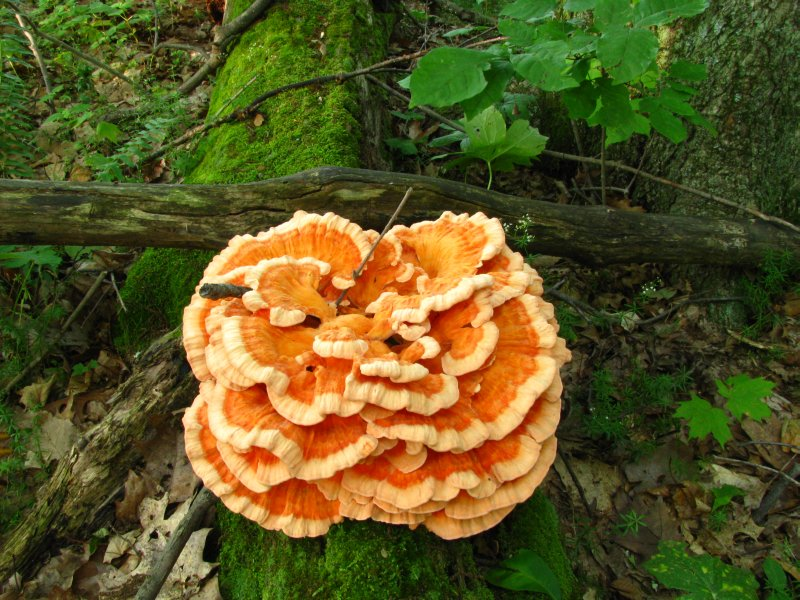
L. cincinnatus, Ohio

Phylogenetic analyses of ITS, nuclear large subunit and mitochondrial small subunit rDNA sequences from a variety of North American species have delineated five distinct clades within the core Laetiporus clade:

- Conifericola clade: contains species that live on conifers, such as L. conifericola and L. huroniensis. All of the other tested species grow on angiosperms.
- Cincinnatus clade: contains L. cincinnatus.
- Sulphureus clade I: contains white-pored L. sulphureus isolates.
- Sulphureus clade II: contains yellow-pored L. sulphureus isolates.
- Gilbertsonii clade: contains L. gilbertsonii and unidentified Caribbean isolates.

In addition, phylogenetic clades have been identified from Japan, Hawaii, South America, Europe, and South Africa.

=== Species ===
- Laetiporus ailaoshanensis B.K.Cui & J.Song (2014)
- Laetiporus baudonii (Pat.) Ryvarden (1991)
- Laetiporus caribensis Banik & D.L.Lindner (2012)
- Laetiporus cincinnatus (Morgan) Burds., Banik & T.J.Volk (1998)
- Laetiporus conifericola Burds. & Banik (2001)
- Laetiporus cremeiporus Y.Ota & T.Hatt. (2010)
- Laetiporus discolor (Klotzsch) Corner (1984)
- Laetiporus flos-musae Overeem (1927)
- Laetiporus gilbertsonii Burds. (2001)
- Laetiporus huroniensis Burds. & Banik (2001)
- Laetiporus miniatus (P.Karst.) Overeem (1925)
- Laetiporus montanus Černý ex Tomšovský & Jankovský (2009)
- Laetiporus persicinus (Berk. & M.A.Curtis) Gilb. (1981)
- Laetiporus portentosus (Berk.) Rajchenb. (1995)
- Laetiporus squalidus R.M.Pires, Motato-Vásq. & Gugliotta (2016)
- Laetiporus sulphureus (Bull.) Murrill (1920)
- Laetiporus versisporus (Lloyd) Imazeki (1943)
- Laetiporus zonatus B.K.Cui & J.Song (2014)

=== Etymology ===
The name Laetiporus means "with bright pores".

== Distribution and habitat ==
The sulphur shelf mushroom is most commonly found on wounds of trees, mostly oak, though it is also frequently found on eucalyptus, yew, sweet chestnut, and willow, as well as conifers in some species. Laetiporus species are parasitic and produce brown rot in the host on which they grow.

It sometimes comes back year after year when the weather suits its sporulation preferences. From late spring to early autumn, the sulphur shelf thrives. This fungus causes a brown cubical rot and embrittlement which in later stages ends in the collapse of the host tree, as it can no longer flex and bend in the wind.

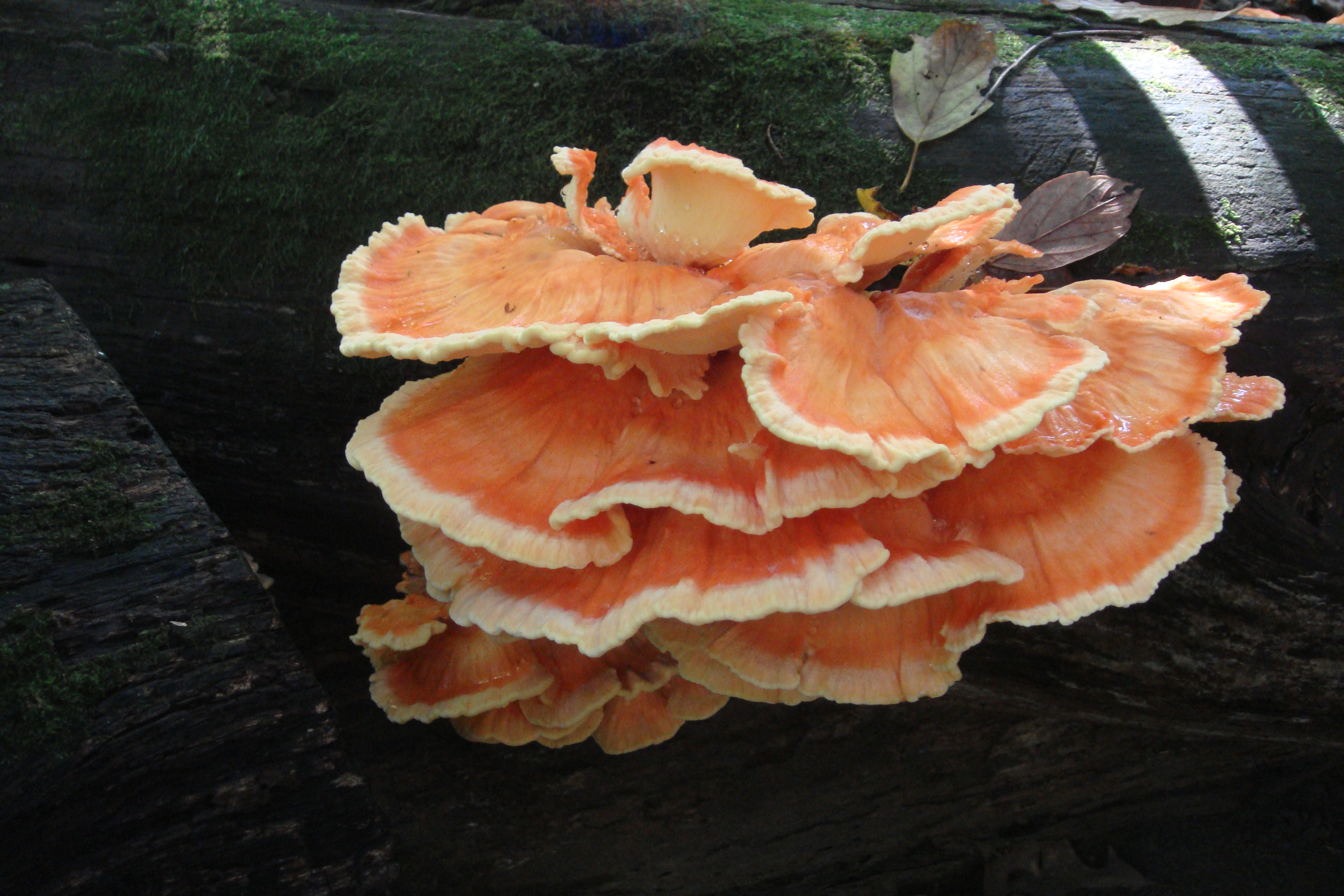
L. cincinnatus in Prospect Park, Brooklyn, New York in October 2012

== Uses ==
The mushroom can be prepared in most ways that one can prepare chicken meat. It can also be used as a substitute for chicken in a vegetarian diet. Additionally, it can be frozen for long periods of time and retain its edibility. In certain parts of Germany and North America, it is considered a delicacy.

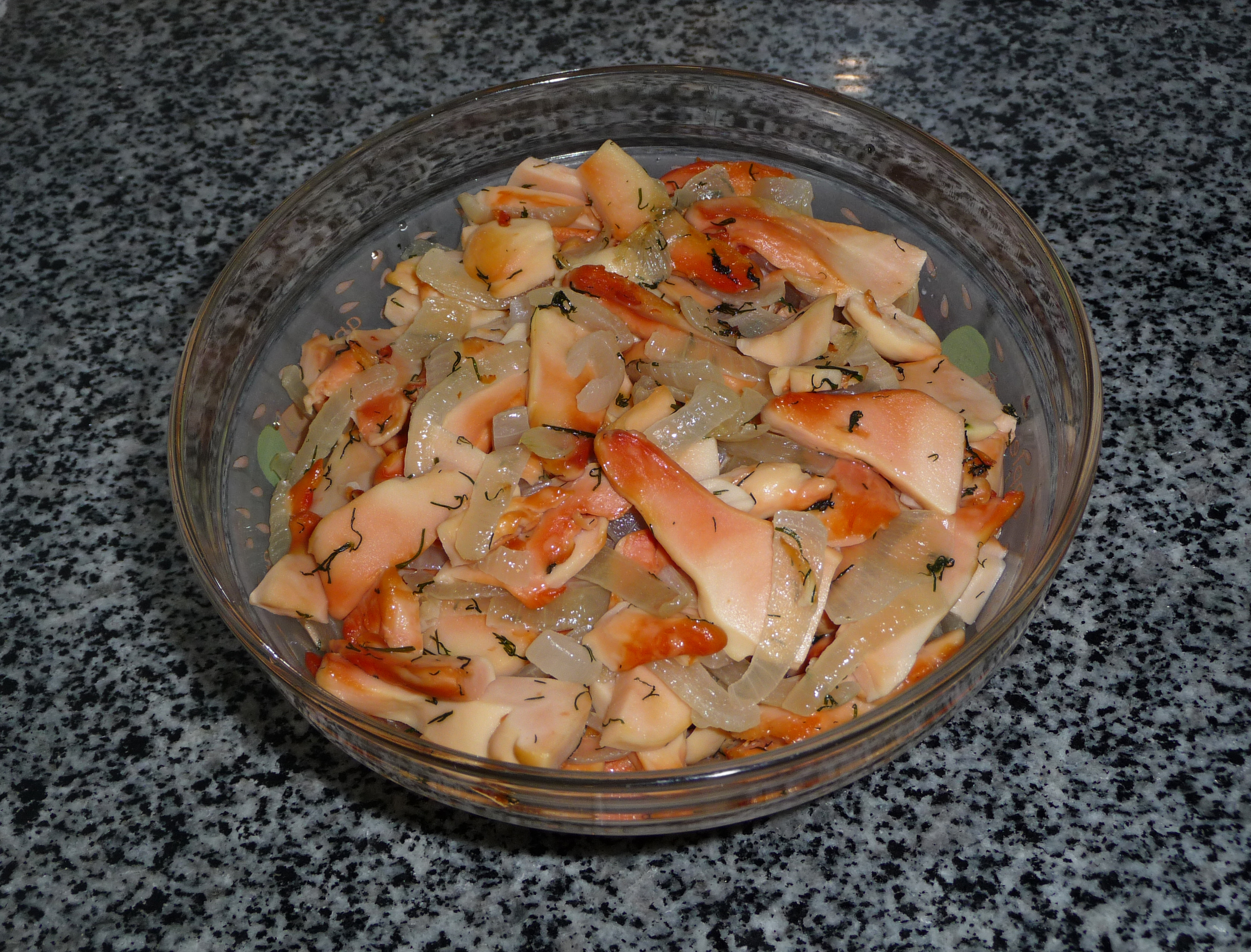
L. sulphureus prepared dish

In some cases eating the mushroom "causes mild reactions ... for example, 'swollen lips' or in rare cases nausea, vomiting, dizziness and disorientation" to those who are sensitive. This is believed to be due to a number of factors that include allergies to the mushroom's protein or toxins which are only somewhat stable at high temperatures. As such, many field guides request that those who eat Laetiporus exercise caution by only eating fresh, young brackets and begin with small quantities to see how well it sits in their stomach.

L. sulphureus has a potent ability to inhibit staph bacteria (Staphylococcus aureus), as well as moderate ability to inhibit the growth of Bacillus subtilis.

== See also ==
- List of meat substitutes
