= Laetiporus ailaoshanensis =

Scientific classification
- Domain: Eukaryota
- Kingdom: Fungi
- Division: Basidiomycota
- Class: Agaricomycetes
- Order: Polyporales
- Family: Laetiporaceae
- Genus: Laetiporus
- Species: L. ailaoshanensis

Binomial name
- Laetiporus ailaoshanensis B.K.Cui & J.Song (2014)

Species of fungus

Laetiporus ailaoshanensis is a species of polypore fungus in the family Fomitopsidaceae. It is found in southwestern China, where it grows on Lithocarpus. The species was described as new to science in 2014 by Baokai Cui and Jie Song. Its fruit body has an orange-yellow to reddish-orange cap surface, with cream to buff pores on the cap underside. The fungus produces ovoid to ellipsoid basidiospores that measure 5.0–6.2 by 4.0–5.0 μm. Molecular analysis of internal transcribed spacer DNA sequences indicate that L. ailaoshanensis is a unique lineage in the genus Laetiporus.
