= Cerevisterol =

Names
- IUPAC name 5α-Ergosta-7,22-diene-3β,5,6β-triol
- Systematic IUPAC name (1R,3aR,5R,5aR,7S,9aR,9bS,11aR)-1-[(3E,5R)-5,6-Dimethylhept-3-en-2-yl]-9a,11a-dimethyl-2,3,3a,6,7,8,9,9a,9b,10,11,11a-dodecahydro-1H-cyclopenta[a]phenanthrene-5,5a,7(5H)-triol
- Other names (22E)-Ergosta-7,22-diene-3β,5α,6β-triol; (22E)-5α-Ergosta-7,22-diene-3β,5,6β-triol; (22E,24R)-Ergosta-7,22-diene-3β,5α,6β-triol; (22E,24R)-5α-Ergosta-7,22-diene-3β,5,6β-triol; (22E,24R)-24-Methyl-5α-cholesta-7,22-diene-3β,5,6β-triol

Identifiers
CAS Number	516-37-0
3D model (JSmol)	Interactive image
ChEBI	CHEBI:68083
ChEMBL	ChEMBL491546
ChemSpider	8356635
PubChem CID	10181133
UNII	6MHQ9J8E6J
CompTox Dashboard (EPA)	DTXSID001045318
- InChI: InChI=1S/C28H46O3/c1-17(2)18(3)7-8-19(4)22-9-10-23-21-15-25(30)28(31)16-20(29)11-14-27(28,6)24(21)12-13-26(22,23)5/h7-8,15,17-20,22-25,29-31H,9-14,16H2,1-6H3/b8-7+/t18-,19+,20-,22+,23-,24-,25+,26+,27+,28-/m0/s1 Key: ARXHRTZAVQOQEU-BRVLHLJYSA-N
- SMILES: O[C@@H]1C=C2[C@]3([H])CC[C@]([C@]3(CC[C@]2([H])[C@@]4(C)CC[C@@H](C[C@]14O)O)C)([H])[C@H](C)/C=C/[C@@H](C(C)C)C

Properties
Chemical formula	C_{28}H_{46}O_{3}
Molar mass	430.673 g·mol^{−1}
Density	1.086 g/ml
Melting point	265.3 °C (509.5 °F; 538.5 K)
- Except where otherwise noted, data are given for materials in their standard state (at 25 °C [77 °F], 100 kPa). Infobox references

Cerevisterol (5α-ergosta-7,22-diene-3β,5,6β-triol) is a sterol. Originally described in the 1930s from the yeast Saccharomyces cerevisiae, it has since been found in several other fungi and, recently, in deep water coral. Cerevisterol has some in vitro bioactive properties, including cytotoxicity to some mammalian cell lines.

== Discovery and properties ==
Cerevisterol was first discovered in 1928 as a component of crude yeast (Saccharomyces cerevisiae) sterols remaining from the manufacture of the related ergosterol. Chemists Edna M. Honeywell and Charles E. Bills purified the compound and reported some of its properties in a 1932 publication. They noted its high melting point (265.3 °C) relative to other sterols, and insolubility in the organic solvent hexane. These characteristics facilitated its purification, and they were able to obtain 10 grams (0.35 oz) of cerevisterol from 4,500 kilograms (9,900 lb) of dry yeast. The following year, they determined its chemical formula to be C_{26}H_{46}O_{3}, with two double bonds, and with two of the oxygen molecules occurring in hydroxyl groups.

Its structure was determined in 1954 by comparison with a sample that was chemically synthesized from ergosterol. Purified cerevisterol has the form of a white amorphous solid. When crystallized in ethyl alcohol, it forms elongated prisms, while crystallization in acetone or ethyl acetate produces broad hexagonal prisms. Its UV absorption spectrum shows a maximum at about 248 nm. Cerevisterol is a stable molecule, showing no discoloration or change in melting point even after several weeks of exposure to light and air.

== Occurrence ==
Cerevisterol is widely distributed in the fungal kingdom. In the division Basidiomycota, it occurs in several members of the fungal family Boletaceae, the edible mushrooms Cantharellus cibarius, Volvariella volvacea, Pleurotus sajor-caju, Laetiporus sulphureus, and Suillus luteus, in the milk mushroom Lactarius hatsudake, and the coral fungus Ramaria botrytis. In the division Ascomycota, it has been reported in Auricularia polytricha, Bulgaria inquinans, Engleromyces goetzei, Acremonium luzulae, and Pencillium herquei, as well as the lichens Ramalina hierrensis and Stereocaulon azoreum. It has also been found in the endophytes Alternaria brassicicola, Fusarium oxysporum, and a strain of Gliocladium, and the deep-sea fungus Aspergillus sydowi. In 2013, the sterol was reported in the South China Sea gorgonian coral Muriceoopsis flavida. A 9-hydroxylated analogue of cerevisterol was found in R. botrytis. A modified version of the compound, (22E, 24R)-cerevisterol, has been reported from the coral Subergorgia mollis. It was shown to be moderately cytotoxic to embryos of the zebrafish Danio rerio.

== Bioactivity ==
Cerevisterol inhibits the eukaryotic enzyme DNA polymerase alpha, and it is also a potent inhibitor of NF-kappa B activation. The sterol is cytotoxic to mouse P388 leukemia cells and A549 human alveolar epithelial cells grown in culture.
