= Laetiporus zonatus =

Scientific classification
- Domain: Eukaryota
- Kingdom: Fungi
- Division: Basidiomycota
- Class: Agaricomycetes
- Order: Polyporales
- Family: Laetiporaceae
- Genus: Laetiporus
- Species: L. zonatus

Binomial name
- Laetiporus zonatus B.K.Cui & J.Song (2014)

Species of fungus

Laetiporus zonatus is a species of polypore fungus in the family Fomitopsidaceae. It is found in southwestern China, where it grows on oak. The species was described as new to science in 2014 by Baokai Cui and Jie Song. The specific epithet zonatus refers to the concentric rings on the upper surface of the white to cream-colored fruit body. The fungus produces ellipsoid to pear-shaped (pyriform) or drop-shaped basidiospores that measure 5.8–7.2 by 4.3–5.5 μm. Molecular analysis of internal transcribed spacer DNA sequences indicate that L. zonatus is a unique lineage in the genus Laetiporus.
