= Edificio Beatriz =

Coordinates: 40°25′50″N 3°40′59″W

Beatriz Building
- Edificio Beatriz
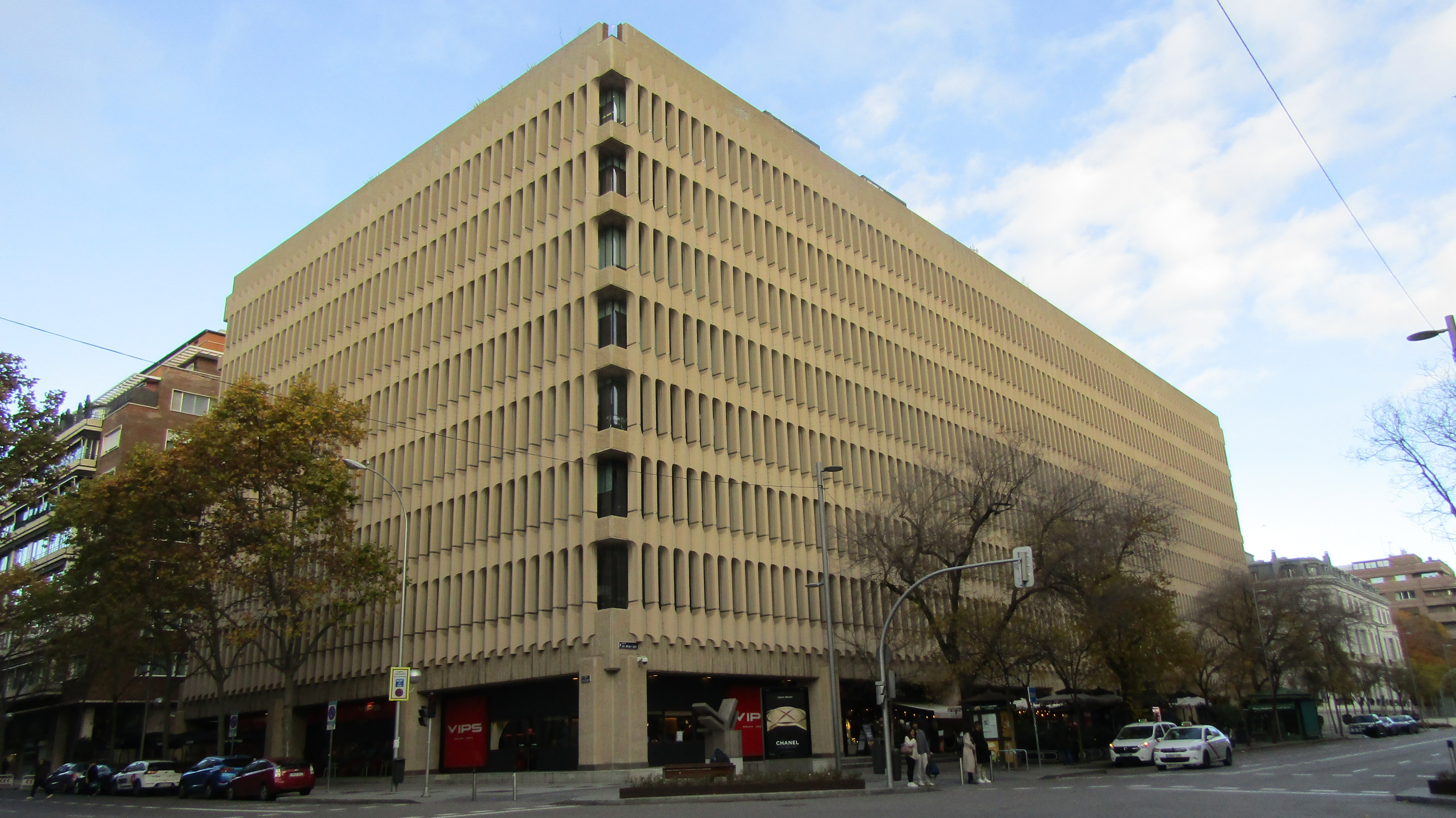
- Interactive map of the Beatriz Building area

General information
- Location: Calle José Ortega y Gasset 29, Madrid, Spain
- Year built: 1964-65
- Owner: Vyosa

Technical details
- Floor count: 5

Design and construction
- Architect: Eleuterio Población Knappe

The Edificio Beatriz (lit. in Spanish Beatriz Building) is an office building located in Madrid, at Calle José Ortega y Gasset. Its owner is the company Vyosa.

== History ==
The Beatriz Building was built by Eleuterio Población Knappe as the central headquarters of the Banco Popular Español. The address was previously occupied by a Jerónimas convent that was founded by the preceptor of the sons of the Catholic Monarchs, Beatriz Galindo, to whom the building's name honors.

== Hosted companies ==
Around 2010, the building underwent a long rehabilitation process that ended in 2019. That year, a new auditorium was opened with 200 theatre seats. In may of 2020, they were of the first to adapt to COVID-19 regulations.

The building hosts mostly companies in the sectors for economics, real estate and law. Some important companies located there include (in 2022) the headquarters for the Spanish branch of Citibank, the North American law firm Baker McKenzie, the European Investment Bank, investment banks Alantra Partners and Pictet, the advisor group Arcano, real estate company Cushman & Wakefield and the basque train company CAF and more. In the commercial side, there is an establishment of Grupo Vips.

== Sources ==
- Fernández Cobián, Esteban (2014). "Reseña: Eduardo Delgado Orusco. Edificio Beatriz, Madrid. Eleuterio Población Knappe. La piel dura". Boletín Académico. Revista de investigación y arquitectura contemporánea (4). Escuela Técnica Superior de Arquitectura. Universidad de La Coruña: 111–112. ISSN 2173-6723. Archived from the original on 11 June 2016.
