= Laetiporus caribensis =

Scientific classification
- Domain: Eukaryota
- Kingdom: Fungi
- Division: Basidiomycota
- Class: Agaricomycetes
- Order: Polyporales
- Family: Laetiporaceae
- Genus: Laetiporus
- Species: L. caribensis

Binomial name
- Laetiporus caribensis Banik & D.L.Lindner (2012)

Species of fungus

Laetiporus caribensis is a species of polypore fungus in the family Fomitopsidaceae. It is found in the Caribbean Islands and in Central America, where it causes a brown rot on tropical hardwood trees. It was described as new to science in 2012 by Mark Banik and Daniel Lindner. The type collection was made in El Yunque National Forest, Puerto Rico, where the fungus was found fruiting on a snag of Guarea guidonia.
