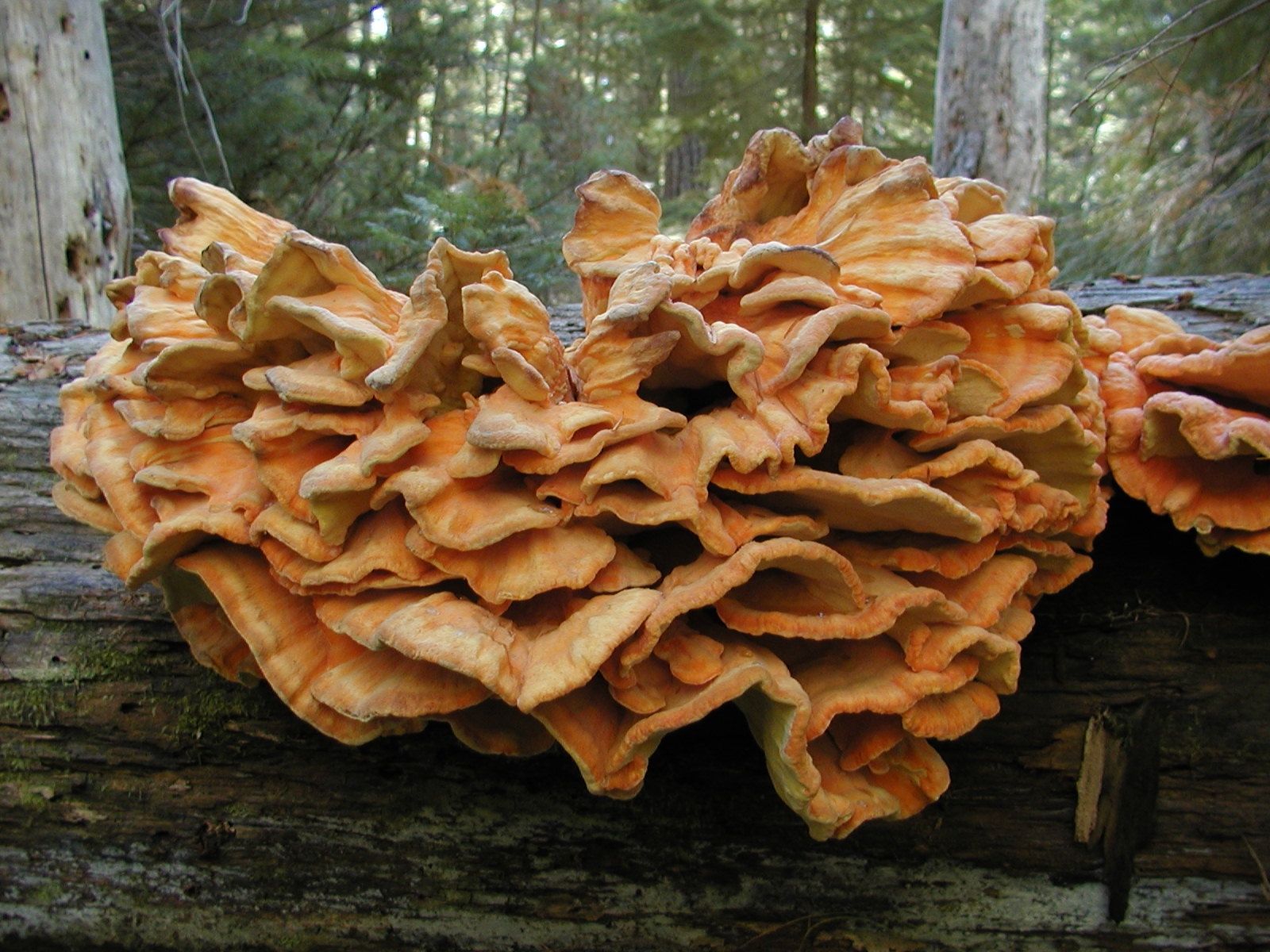

Scientific classification
- Domain: Eukaryota
- Kingdom: Fungi
- Division: Basidiomycota
- Class: Agaricomycetes
- Order: Polyporales
- Family: Laetiporaceae
- Genus: Laetiporus
- Species: L. conifericola

Binomial name
- Laetiporus conifericola Burds. & Banik (2001)

= Laetiporus conifericola =

Species of fungus

Laetiporus conifericola is a species of polypore fungus in the family Fomitopsidaceae. It is found in western North America ranging from California to Alaska, where it grows as a plant pathogen on conifer trees, particularly fir, spruce, and hemlock. Fruit bodies of the fungus comprise overlapping pore-bearing plates, measuring collectively up to 60 cm (24 in) across, and up to 4 cm (2 in) thick. Their color ranges from bright orange to salmon orange on the upper surface of the cap and stipe, with a yellow pore surface on the cap underside. Spores are egg-shaped, smooth, hyaline (translucent), and measure 6.5–8.0 by 4.0–5.0 μm. The species has a pleasant odour when fresh.

The species was described as new to science in 2001 by mycologists Harold H. Burdsall and Mark T. Banik. The type collection was made in Kenai Peninsula, Alaska, in October 1999. L. conifericola is distinguished from other Laetiporus species by its growth on conifers. Until its confirmation as a distinct species, it was frequently misidentified as the eastern North American species L. sulphureus, which grows on hardwoods. L. gilbertsonii is also similar. L. conifericola is generally considered edible, but some people have reported having gastrointestinal upset after consuming the fungus. Young specimens with soft flesh or the fresh margins of older fruit bodies are best for eating, and thorough cooking is recommended.
