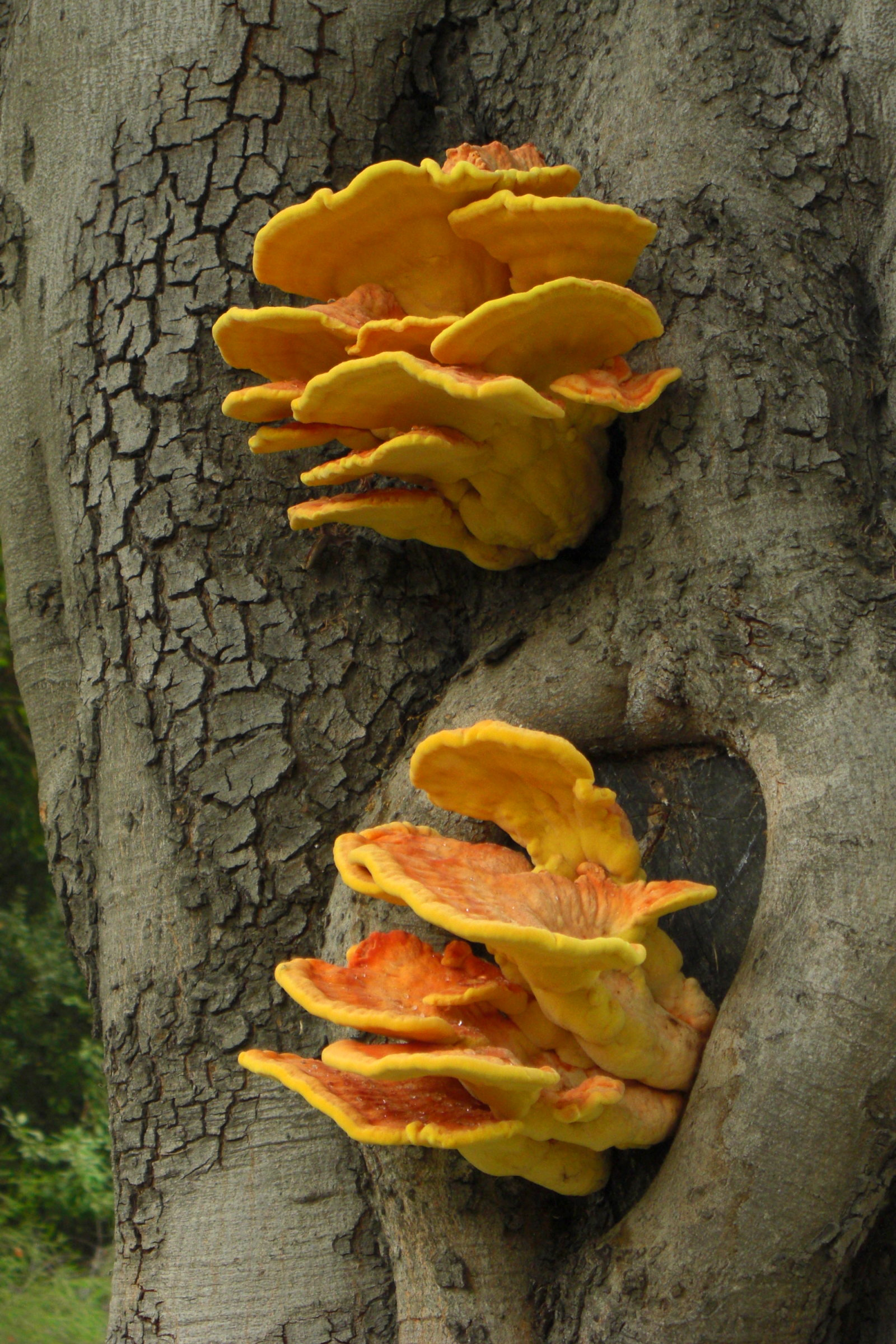

Scientific classification
- Kingdom: Fungi
- Division: Basidiomycota
- Class: Agaricomycetes
- Order: Polyporales
- Family: Laetiporaceae
- Genus: Laetiporus
- Species: L. gilbertsonii

Binomial name
- Laetiporus gilbertsonii Burds. (2001)

= Laetiporus gilbertsonii =

Species of fungus

Laetiporus gilbertsonii is a species of polypore fungus in the family Fomitopsidaceae.

== Taxonomy ==
It was one of three new Laetiporus species published in 2001, which were distinguished genetically from the common Laetiporus sulphureus; the others were L. conifericola and L. huroniensis. The type collection, made in San Francisco's Golden Gate Park in 1997, was found fruiting on a eucalyptus tree.

The fungus is named in honor of mycologist Robert Lee Gilbertson.

== Description ==
The yellow to orangish cap is 20–30 centimetres (8–12 in) wide, becoming lobed and zonate with age. The flesh is soft, white to yellowish, with a mild or sour taste. The spore print is white.

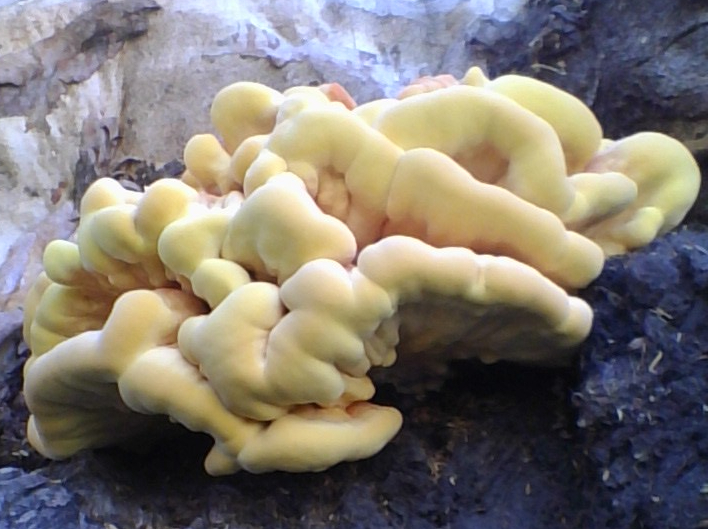
Fungi

=== Similar species ===
Laetiporus conifericola is very similar in appearance, but is readily distinguished by its growth on conifers. L. sulphureus and Pycnoporellus fulgens are also similar.

== Distribution and habitat ==
The species is found in western North America (from September to November) and South America. It has been collected in Oregon and Washington.

It grows on hardwood stumps and logs.

== Uses ==
L. gilbertsonii is edible, although some people have reported experiencing gastrointestinal upset after consuming it.
