= Inoscavin A =

Names
- IUPAC name 2-(3,4-Dihydroxyphenyl)-6-[(E)-2-(3,4-dihydroxyphenyl)ethenyl]-5'-methylspiro[2H-furo[3,2-c]pyran-3,2'-furan]-3',4-dione

Identifiers
CAS Number	250124-03-9
3D model (JSmol)	Interactive image
ChEBI	CHEBI:200360
ChEMBL	ChEMBL487596
ChemSpider	8609895
PubChem CID	10434469
CompTox Dashboard (EPA)	DTXSID301045779
- InChI: InChI=1S/C25H18O9/c1-12-8-21(30)25(34-12)22-20(33-23(25)14-4-7-17(27)19(29)10-14)11-15(32-24(22)31)5-2-13-3-6-16(26)18(28)9-13/h2-11,23,26-29H,1H3/b5-2+ Key: ZGKUEJPXTILOCD-GORDUTHDSA-N
- SMILES: CC1=CC(=O)C2(O1)C(OC3=C2C(=O)OC(=C3)/C=C/C4=CC(=C(C=C4)O)O)C5=CC(=C(C=C5)O)O

Properties
Chemical formula	C_{25}H_{18}O_{9}
Molar mass	462.410 g·mol^{−1}
- Except where otherwise noted, data are given for materials in their standard state (at 25 °C [77 °F], 100 kPa). Infobox references

Inoscavin A is an antioxidant isolated from the mushroom Inonotus xeranticus.

== See also ==
- Inoscavin
