= Tropicoporus linteus =

Species of fungus

External image
- On page 14 of Lima et al. (2022)'s paper on MNHN's website.

Tropicoporus linteus

Scientific classification
- Kingdom: Fungi
- Division: Basidiomycota
- Class: Agaricomycetes
- Order: Hymenochaetales
- Family: Hymenochaetaceae
- Genus: Tropicoporus
- Species: T. linteus

Binomial name
- Tropicoporus linteus (Berk. & M.A.Curtis) L.W. Zhou & Y.C. Dai (2015)

Synonyms
- Polyporus linteus Berk. & M.A.Curtis (1860); Fomes linteus (Berk. & M.A.Curtis) Cooke (1885); Scindalma linteum (Berk. & M.A.Curtis) Kuntze (1898); Pyropolyporus linteus (Berk. & M.A.Curtis) Murrill (1903); Fulvifomes linteus (Berk. & M.A.Curtis) Murrill (1915); Phellinus linteus (Berk. & M.A.Curtis) Teng (1963); Inonotus linteus (Berk. & M.A.Curtis) Teixeira (1992)

Tropicoporus linteus is a tropical American mushroom. Its former name Phellinus linteus is applied wider, including to an East Asian mushroom.

== Taxonomy ==
Polyporus linteus was named by Miles Joseph Berkeley and Moses Ashley Curtis and first reported with specimen from Nicaragua in 1860. Phellinus linteus was a rename by Shu Chün Teng in 1963. It was renamed Tropicoporus linteus by Li-Wei Zhou and Yu-Cheng Dai in 2015.

The following mushrooms are applied with the name Phellinus linteus:

=== Americas ===
- Phellinus linteus per se, the tropical American species, now Tropicoporus linteus
- In subtropical South America, Phellinus linteus on Cordia americana is actually Tropicoporus drechsleri; specimens collected on other plant hosts require further studies.

=== Asia ===
- Phellinus linteus in East Asia

=== Africa ===
- Xanthochrous rudis, an African species formerly regarded as a synonym of Phellinus linteus, regained taxon independency and was renamed Tropicoporus rudis.

== Description ==
A description was made by Tian et al. (2012) for the epitype.

This mushroom's tube trama is dimitic, contains generative and skeletal hyphae.

== Ecology and habitat ==
Tropicoporus mushrooms cause a white rot.

This mushroom is known distributed in Nicaragua, United States (Florida) and Brazil.

Tropicoporus linteus grows on oak and tamarind.
