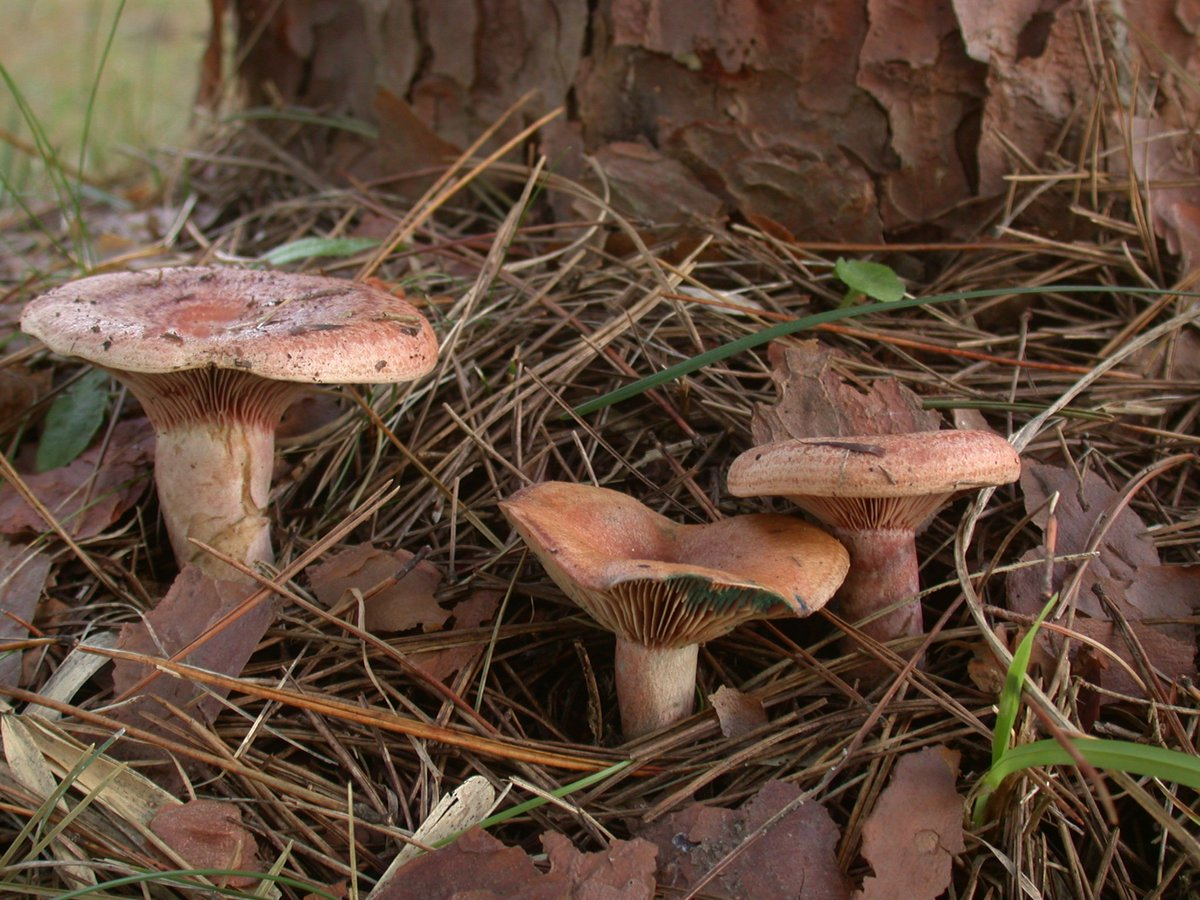

Scientific classification
- Kingdom: Fungi
- Division: Basidiomycota
- Class: Agaricomycetes
- Order: Russulales
- Family: Russulaceae
- Genus: Lactarius
- Species: L. hatsudake

Binomial name
- Lactarius hatsudake Nobuj. Tanaka, 1890

Synonyms
- Lactarius hatsudake akahatsu (Nobuj. Tanaka) Kawam., 1914; Lactarius akahatsu Nobuj. Tanaka, 1890; Lactarius hatsudake hatsudake Nobuj. Tanaka, 1890

= Lactarius hatsudake =

Species of fungus

Lactarius hatsudake, also known as red milk mushroom, is a species of agaric fungus in the family Russulaceae native to Asia, first described by Tanaka Nobujirō in 1890. It is a sought-after choice edible in several Asian countries, with attempts of cultivation in mycorrhizal symbiosis being made.

== Distribution and ecology ==
Lactarius hatsudake is widely distributed in Southeast Asia, including China, Japan, Bonin Islands, eastern Russia and Korea. It is ectomycorrhizal with Pinus species, such as Pinus thunbergii, Pinus densiflora, Pinus luchuensis, Pinus yunnanensis, and Pinus kesiya.
