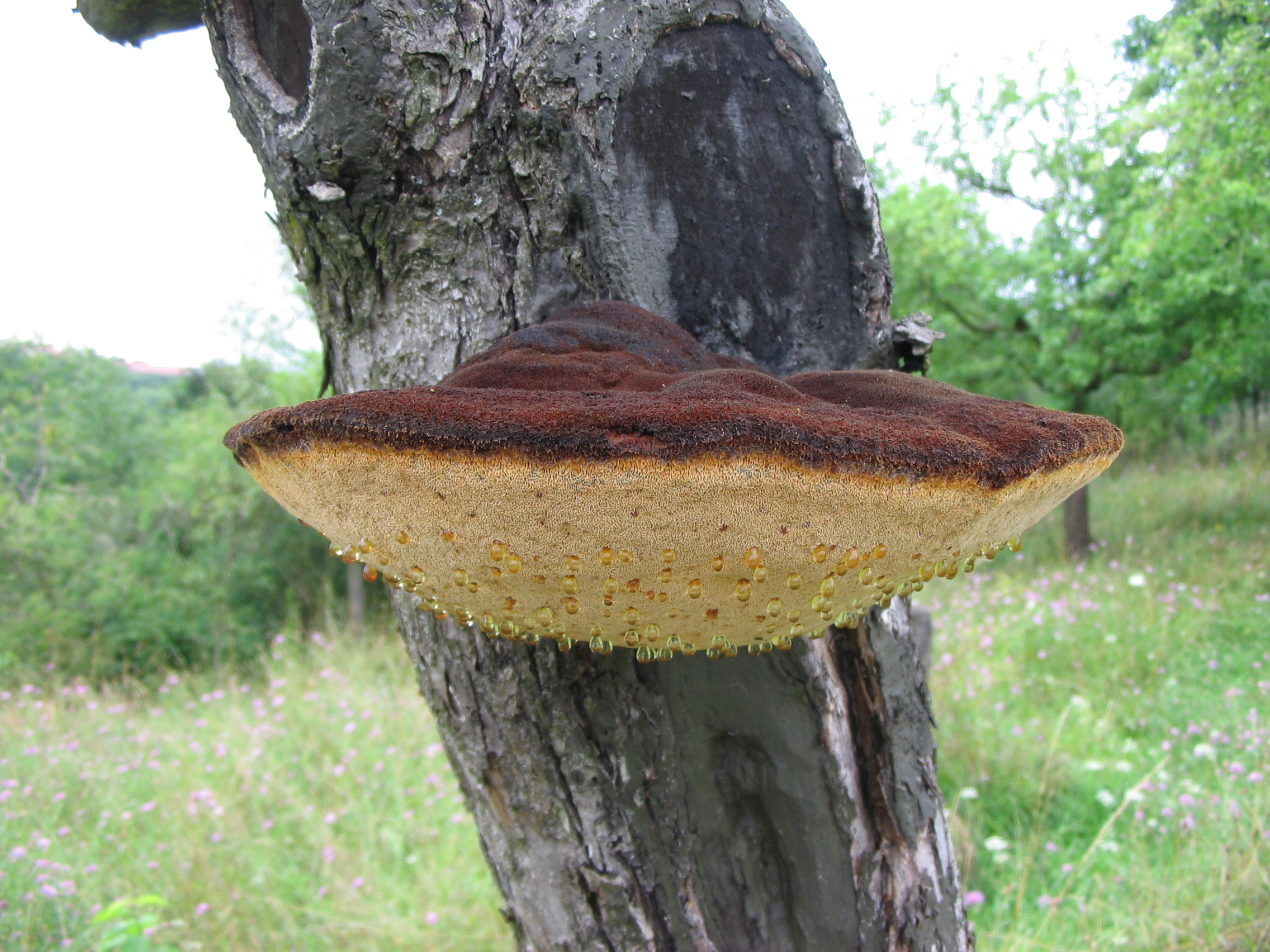

Scientific classification
- Kingdom: Fungi
- Division: Basidiomycota
- Class: Agaricomycetes
- Order: Hymenochaetales
- Family: Hymenochaetaceae
- Genus: Inonotus
- Species: I. hispidus

Binomial name
- Inonotus hispidus (Bull.) P. Karst., (1880)

Synonyms
- Boletus hirsutus Boletus spongiosus Boletus velutinus Boletus villosus Hemidiscia hispida Inodermus hispidus Inonotus hirsutus Phaeolus endocrocinus Phaeoporus hispidus Polyporus endocrocinus Polyporus hispidus Polystictus hispidus Xanthochrous hispidus

= Inonotus hispidus =

Species of bracket fungus in the family Hymenochaetaceae

Inonotus hispidus
- Mycological characteristics
- Pores on hymenium
- No distinct cap
- Hymenium attachment is not applicable
- Lacks a stipe
- Spore print is brown
- Ecology is parasitic
- Edibility is inedible

Inonotus hispidus, commonly known as shaggy bracket, is a fungus and plant pathogen found in Europe, Asia and North America.

== Description ==
The fruit bodies are generally semicircular and lumpy, measuring 10–20 centimetres (4–8 in) across. They are orangish with a lighter margin when fresh, blackening in age. The flesh is orangish and the spore print is brown.

=== Similar species ===
Inonotus quercustris is more frequent to the south, with Ischnoderma resinosum and Laetiporus persicinus also being similar.

== Habitat and distribution ==
It is found on oak and other hardwoods through eastern North America.

== Uses ==
This fungus has been used in eastern Asia as a popular remedy for many illnesses like cancer, diabetes, and other stomach ailments. In modern pharmacology, it has aided in lowering blood glucose levels, showing anti-tumor responses and improving overall health in mice.
