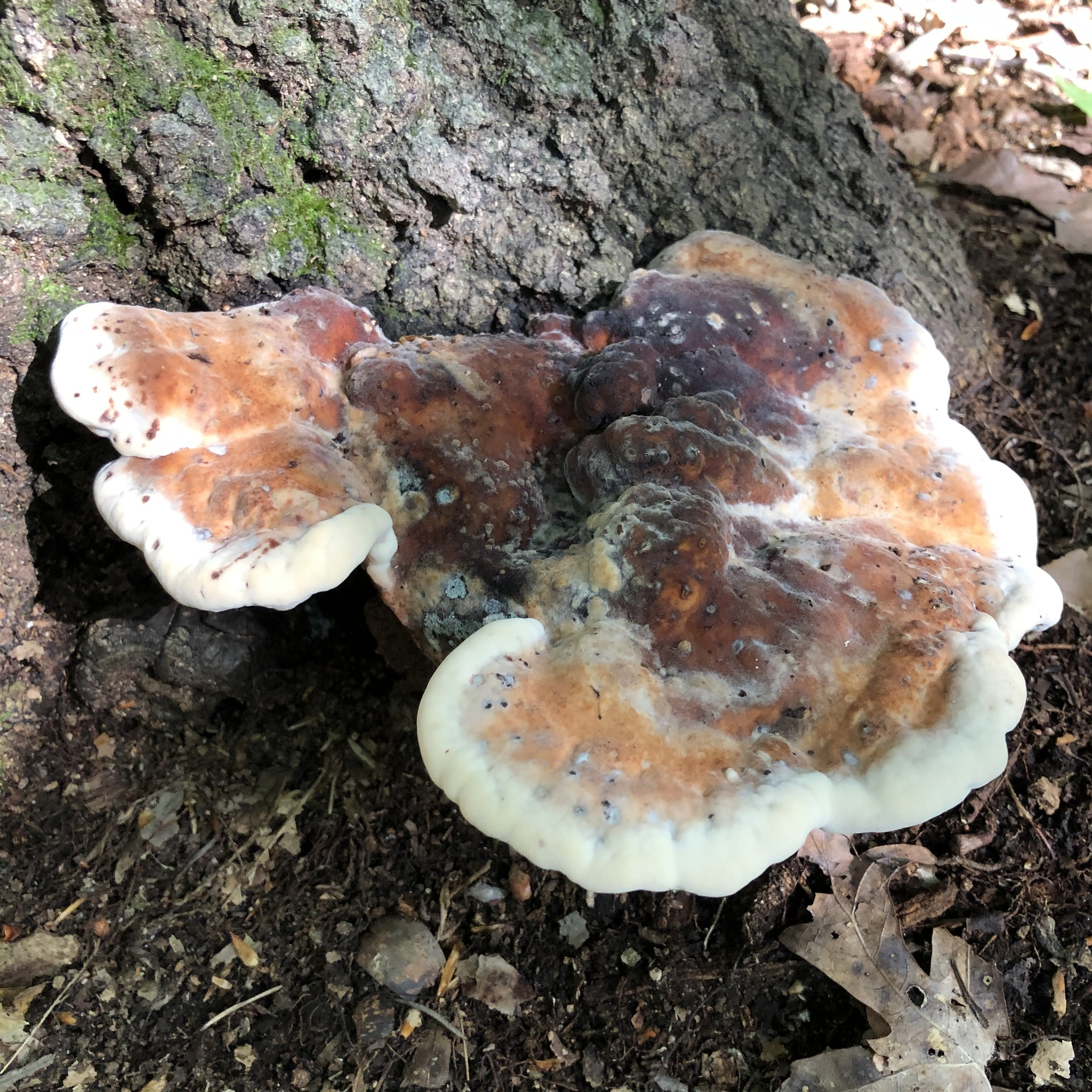

Scientific classification
- Domain: Eukaryota
- Kingdom: Fungi
- Division: Basidiomycota
- Class: Agaricomycetes
- Order: Polyporales
- Family: Laetiporaceae
- Genus: Laetiporus
- Species: L. persicinus

Binomial name
- Laetiporus persicinus (Berk. & M.A.Curtis) Gilb. (1981)

Synonyms
- Polyporus persicinus Berk. & M.A.Curtis (1853); Scutiger persicinus (Berk. & M.A.Curtis) Murrill (1903); Meripilus persicinus (Berk. & M.A.Curtis) Ryvarden (1972); Buglossoporus persicinus (Berk. & M.A.Curtis) Corner (1984); Cladoporus persicinus (Berk. & M.A.Curtis) Teixeira (1992)

= Laetiporus persicinus =

Species of fungus

Laetiporus persicinus, commonly known as the white chicken mushroom, is a species of fungi in the genus Laetiporus.

== Taxonomy ==
It was first described scientifically by Miles Berkeley and Moses Ashley Curtis in 1853 as Polyporus persicinus.

== Description ==
Laetiporus persicinus has a salmon pink cap and white pores. The cap is velvety and can be 10–25 centimetres (4–10 in) wide. The stem tapers from the cap; it is 2–7 cm (1–3 in) long and 2–7 cm wide at the base. The flesh is whitish and stains brown in zones. The odor is mild or meaty, with a mild to poor taste. The spore print is white.

=== Similar species ===
It is closely related to L. sulphureus (the chicken mushroom).

It may resemble Phaeolus schweinitzii.

== Distribution and habitat ==
The species has been collected in Africa, Asia, Europe, Australia, Greenland, Iceland, North America, and South America. In North America, it can be found in the eastern United States from June to September.

It grows on the ground on dead and living hardwood and softwood trees.

== Edibility ==
Reports differ as to the species' edibility.
