= Shu Chun Teng =

Chinese mycologist (1902–1970)

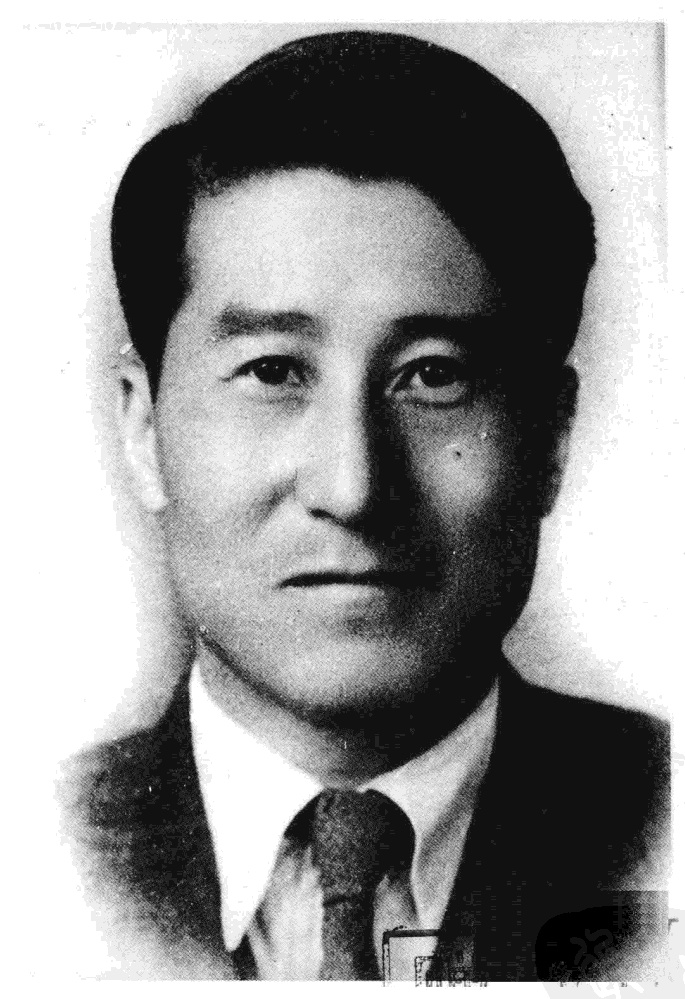
- Born: 12 December 1902; Fuzhou, Fujian
- Died: 1 May 1970 (aged 67)
- Education: Cornell University; Tsinghua University
- Occupation: Mycology

Shu Chun Teng
- Traditional Chinese: 鄧叔群
- Simplified Chinese: 邓叔群
Transcriptions
Standard Mandarin
- Hanyu Pinyin: Dèng Shūqún
- Wade–Giles: Teng^{4} Shu^{1}ch'ün^{2}

Shu Chun Teng (Chinese: 鄧叔群; pinyin: Dèng Shūqún, 12 December 1902 – 1 May 1970), also abbreviated as S. C. Teng, was a Chinese mycologist.

== Early life ==
Born in Min County of Fuzhou, Teng graduated from Tsinghua University in 1923.

He went on to continue his studies in America in 1923, obtaining a master's degree in forestry from Cornell University in 1926. But he discontinued his PhD studies at Cornell University in 1928, taking up the position as professor of plant pathology at Lingnan University (Guangzhou) in China.

== Occupation and work ==
In 1945 he went to Shanghai and set up the Forest Exological Research Centre. Since 1949, he served as assistant director and vice president of Shenyang Agricultural University, and then in 1955 he served in the same previously stated post in Northeast Agricultural College. He was a researcher and deputy director of the Institute of Microbiology of Chinese Academy of Sciences since 1955, member of the Department of Biology in the Chinese Academy of Sciences.
