= Ergosterol peroxide =

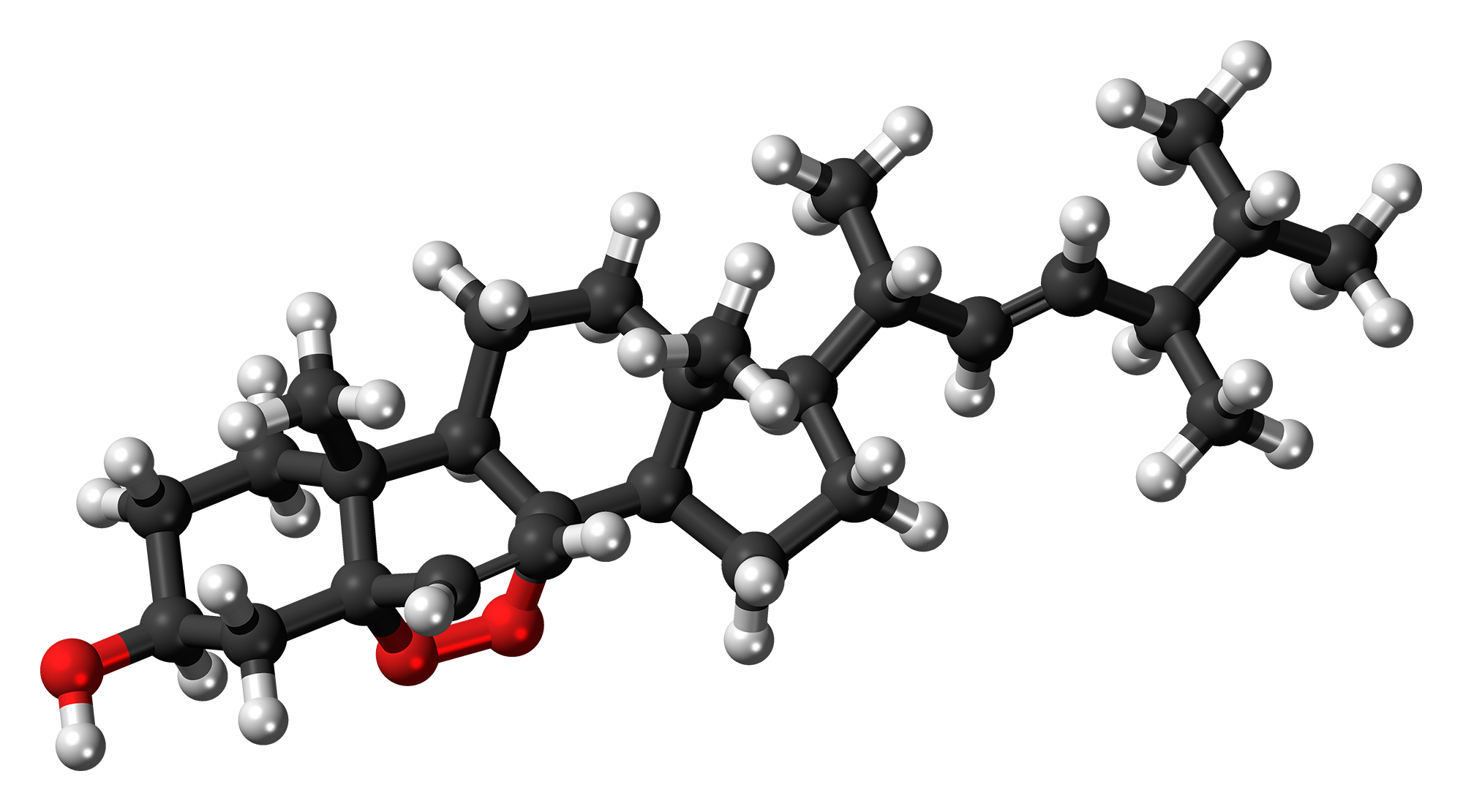

Names
- IUPAC name (3S,5S,8S,9R,10R,13R,14R,17R)-10,13-dimethyl-17-[(1R,2E,4R)-1,4,5-trimethylhex-2-en-1-yl]-1,3,4,9,10,11,12,13,14,15,16,17-dodecahydro-2H-5,8-epidioxycyclopenta[a]phenanthren-3-ol

Identifiers
CAS Number	2061-64-5
3D model (JSmol)	Interactive image
ChEBI	CHEBI:65858
ChEMBL	ChEMBL434750
ChemSpider	4508532
PubChem CID	5351516
UNII	UG9TN81TGH
CompTox Dashboard (EPA)	DTXSID501021533
- InChI: InChI=1S/C28H44O3/c1-18(2)19(3)7-8-20(4)22-9-10-23-25(22,5)13-12-24-26(6)14-11-21(29)17-27(26)15-16-28(23,24)31-30-27/h7-8,15-16,18-24,29H,9-14,17H2,1-6H3/b8-7+/t19-,20+,21-,22+,23+,24+,25+,26+,27+,28-/m0/s1
- SMILES: O[C@@H]2C[C@]\13OO[C@]4(/C=C/1)[C@@H]([C@]3(CC2)C)CC[C@]5(C)[C@@H]([C@@H](/C=C/[C@H](C)C(C)C)C)CC[C@@H]45

Properties
Chemical formula	C_{28}H_{44}O_{3}
Molar mass	428.647
Density	1.08g/cm^{3}
Boiling point	499.7 °C (931.5 °F; 772.8 K) at 760mmHg

Hazards
Flash point	256 °C (493 °F; 529 K)
- Except where otherwise noted, data are given for materials in their standard state (at 25 °C [77 °F], 100 kPa). Infobox references

Ergosterol peroxide (5α,8α-epidioxy-22E-ergosta-6,22-dien-3β-ol) is a steroid derivative. It has been isolated from a variety of fungi, yeast, lichens and sponges, and has been reported to exhibit immunosuppressive, anti-inflammatory, antiviral, trypanocidal and antitumor activities in vitro.
