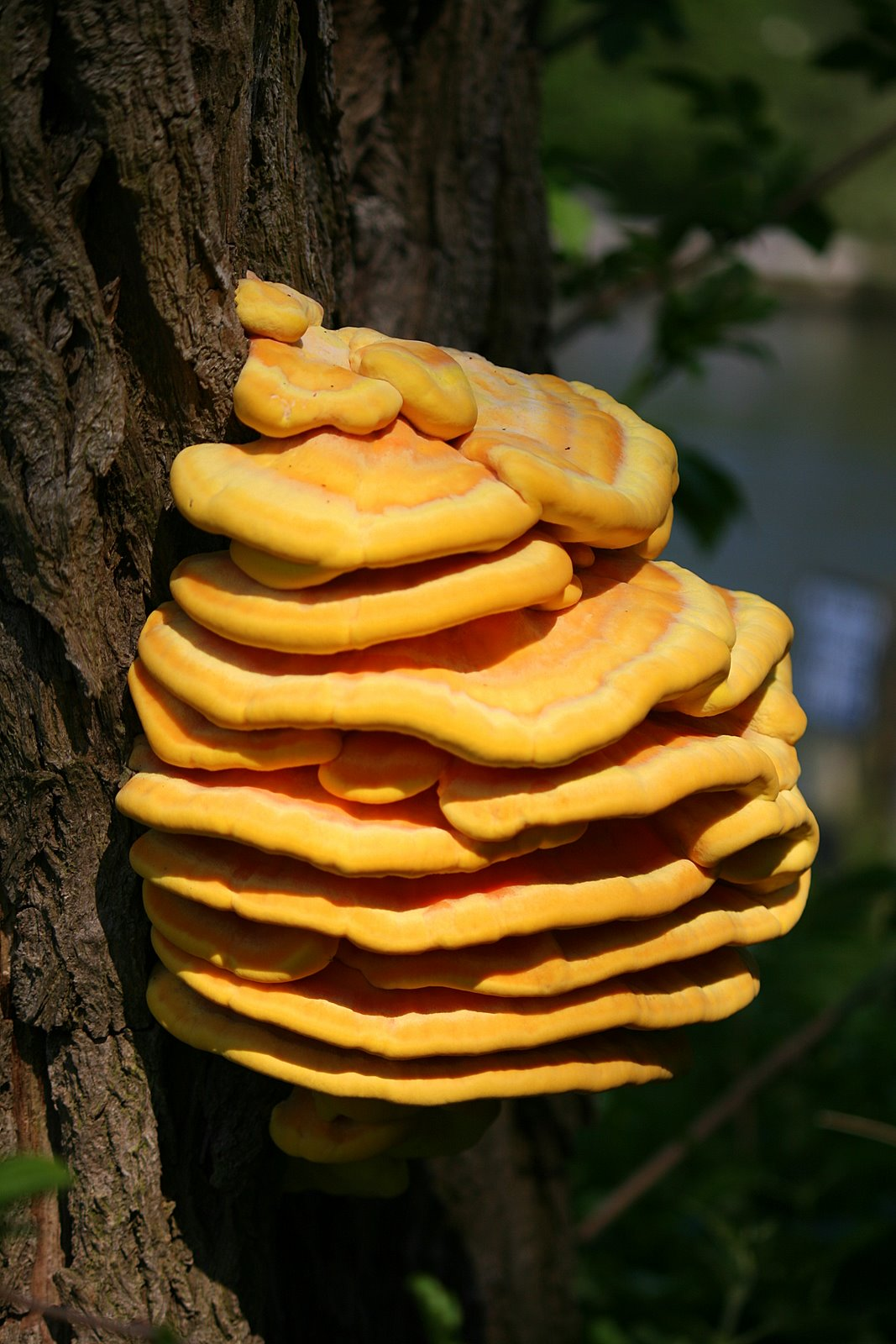

Scientific classification
- Kingdom: Fungi
- Division: Basidiomycota
- Class: Agaricomycetes
- Order: Polyporales
- Family: Laetiporaceae
- Genus: Laetiporus
- Species: L. sulphureus

Binomial name
- Laetiporus sulphureus (Bull.) Murrill (1920)

Synonyms
- Species synonymy: Agarico-carnis flammula Paulet, (1793); Agarico-pulpa styptica Paulet, (1793); Agaricus speciosus Battarra, (1755); Boletus citrinus Lumn., (1791); Boletus coriaceus Huds., (1778); Boletus imbricatus Bull., (1788); Boletus lingua-cervina Schrank, (1789); Boletus ramosus Bull., (1791); Boletus sulphureus Mérat, (1821); Boletus sulphureus Bull., (1789); Boletus tenax Bolton, (1788); Boletus tenax Lightf., (1778); Ceriomyces aurantiacus (Pat.) Sacc., (1888); Ceriomyces neumanii Bres., (1920); Cladomeris casearius (Fr.) Quél., (1886); Cladomeris imbricatus (Bull.) Quél., (1886); Cladoporus sulphureus (Bull.) Teixeira, (1986); Daedalea imbricata (Bull.) Purton, (1821); Grifola sulphurea (Bull.) Pilát, (1934); Laetiporus speciosus Battarra ex Murrill, (1904); Laetiporus sulphureus f. aurantiacus (Pat.) Bondartsev, (1953); Laetiporus sulphureus f. ramosus (Quél.) Bondartsev, (1953); Leptoporus casearius (Fr.) Quél., (1888); Leptoporus imbricatus (Bull.) Quél., (1888); Leptoporus ramosus (Bull.) Quél., (1888); Leptoporus sulphureus (Bull.) Quél.,(1888); Merisma imbricatum (Bull.) Gillet, (1878); Merisma sulphureus (Bull.) Gillet, (1878); Polypilus casearius (Fr.) P. Karst., (1882); Polypilus imbricatus (Bull.) P. Karst., (1882); Polypilus sulphureus (Bull.) P. Karst., (1881); Polyporellus rubricus (Berk.) P. Karst., (1880); Polyporus candicinus (Scop.) J. Schröt.; Polyporus casearius Fr., Epicr. (1838); Polyporus cincinnatus Morgan, (1885); Polyporus imbricatus (Bull.) Fr., (1821); Polyporus ramosus (Bull.) Gray, (1821); Polyporus rostafinskii Blonski, (1888); Polyporus rubricus Berk., (1851); Polyporus sulphureus (Bull.) Fr., (1821); Polyporus todari Inzenga, (1866); Ptychogaster aurantiacus Pat., (1885); Ptychogaster aureus Lloyd, (1921); Sistotrema sulphureum (Bull.) Rebent., (1804); Stereum speciosum Fr., (1871); Sulphurina sulphurea (Quél.) Pilát, (1942); Tyromyces sulphureus (Bull.) Donk, (1933)

= Laetiporus sulphureus =

Species of fungus

Laetiporus sulphureus Mycological characteristics
- Pores on hymenium
- Cap is flat
- Hymenium attachment is irregular or not applicable
- Lacks a stipe
- Spore print is white
- Ecology is saprotrophic or parasitic
- Edibility is choice

Laetiporus sulphureus is a species of bracket fungus (fungi that grow on trees). Its common names include sulphur polypore, sulphur shelf, and chicken-of-the-woods. Its fruit bodies grow as striking golden-yellow shelf-like structures on tree trunks and branches. Old fruitbodies fade to pale beige or pale grey. The undersurface of the fruit body is made up of tubelike pores rather than gills.

Found in Europe and North America, L. sulphureus is a saprophyte and occasionally a weak parasite, causing brown cubical rot in the heartwood of trees on which it grows. Unlike many bracket fungi, it is edible when young, although adverse reactions have been reported.

== Taxonomy ==
Laetiporus sulphureus was first described as Boletus sulphureus by French mycologist Pierre Bulliard in 1789. It has had many synonyms and was finally given its current name in 1920 by American mycologist William Murrill. Laetiporus means "with bright pores" and sulphureus means "the colour of sulphur".

Investigations in North America have shown that there are several similar species within what has been considered L. sulphureus and that the true L. sulphureus may be restricted to regions east of the Rocky Mountains. Phylogenetic analyses of ITS and nuclear large subunit and mitochondrial small subunit rDNA sequences from North American collections have delineated five distinct clades within the core Laetiporus clade. Sulphureus clade I contains white-pored L. sulphureus isolates, while Sulphureus clade II contains yellow-pored L. sulphureus isolates.

== Description ==
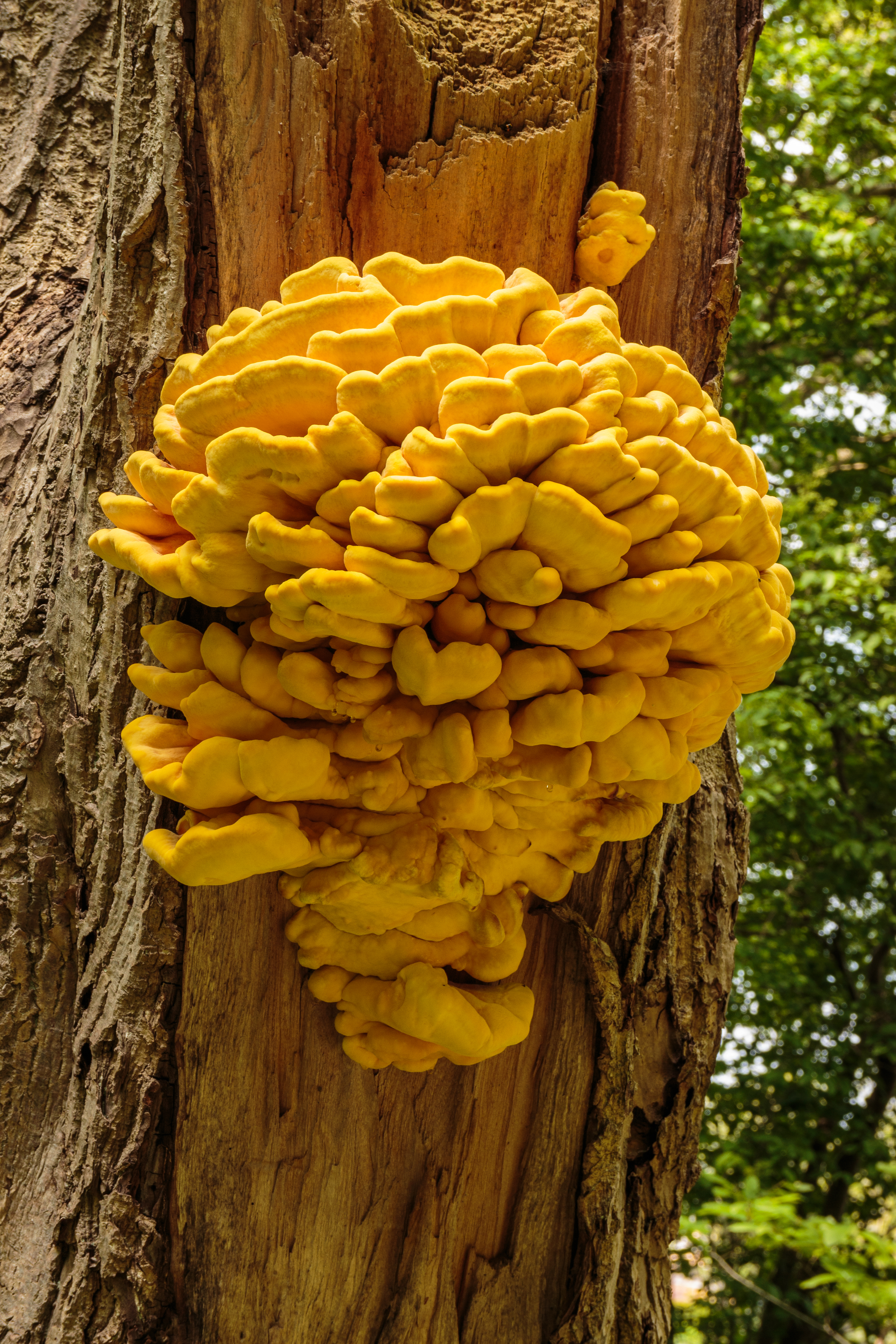
Underside, on Ginkgo biloba

The fruiting body emerges directly from the trunk of a tree and is initially knob-shaped, but soon expands to fan-shaped shelves, typically growing in overlapping tiers. It is sulphur-yellow to bright orange in color and has a suedelike texture. Old fruitbodies fade to tan or whitish. Each shelf may be anywhere from 5 to 60 centimetres (2 to 23 1/2 inches) across and up to 4–12 cm (1 1/2–4 1/2 in) thick. The fertile surface is sulphur-yellow with small pores or tubes and produces a white spore print. When fresh, the flesh is succulent with a strong fungal aroma and exudes a yellowish, transparent juice, but soon becomes dry and brittle.

Although fairly distinct, it can resemble Laetiporus persicinus.

== Distribution and habitat ==
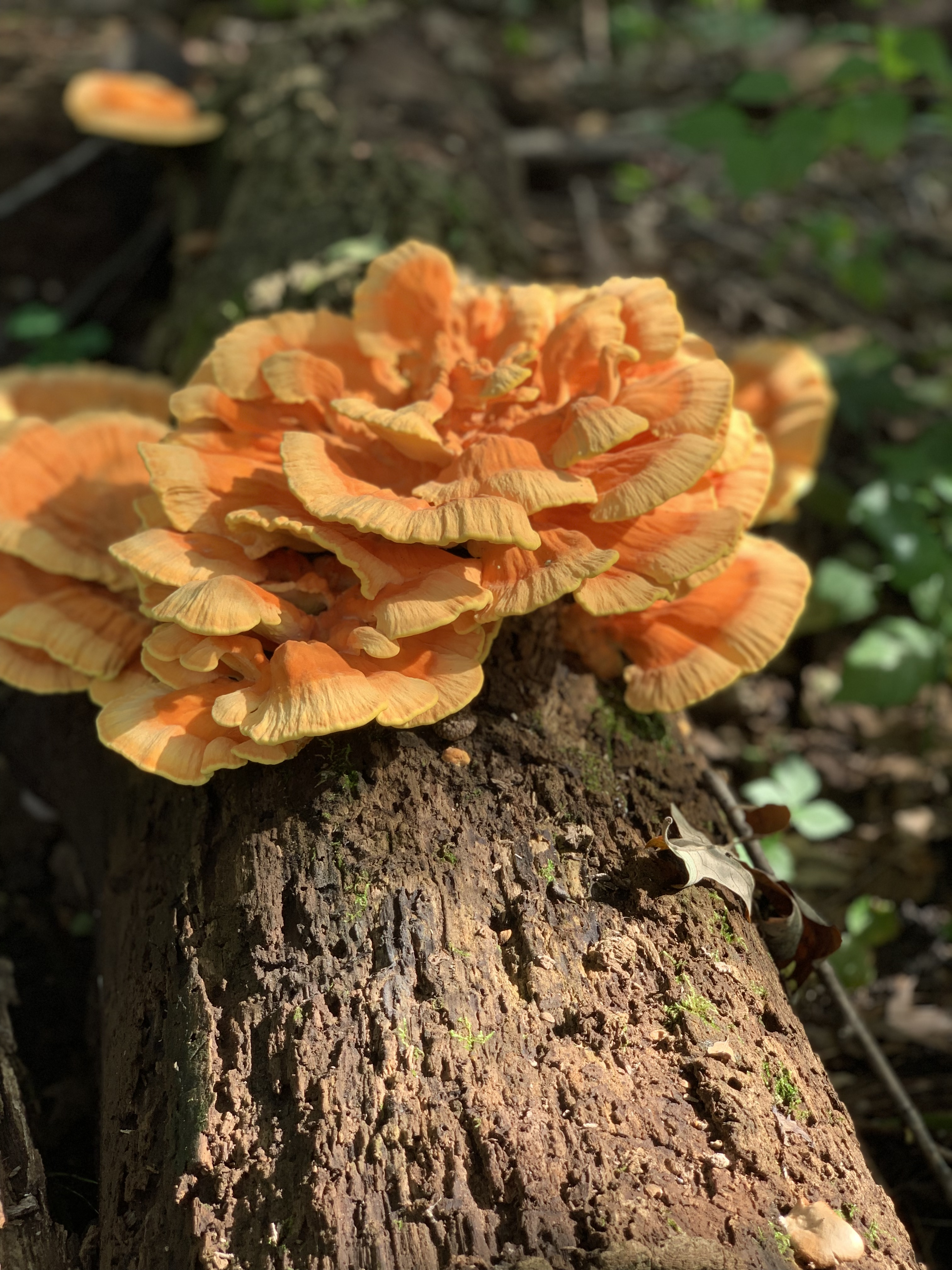
Wild specimen from Illinois in early autumn

Laetiporus sulphureus is widely distributed across Europe (April to November) and North America, although its range may be restricted to areas east of the Rockies. It grows on dead or mature hardwoods and has been reported from a very wide variety of host trees, such as Quercus, Prunus, Pyrus, Populus, Salix, Robinia, and Fagus, occasionally also from conifers, from August to October or later, sometimes as early as June. In the Mediterranean region, this species is usually found on Ceratonia and Eucalyptus. It can usually be found growing in clusters.

=== Parasitism ===
The fungus causes brown cubical rot of heartwood in the roots, tree base and stem. After infection, the wood is at first discolored yellowish to red but subsequently becomes reddish-brown and brittle. At the final stages of decay, the wood can be rubbed like powder between the fingers.

=== Guinness world record ===
A specimen weighing 45 kilograms (100 lb) was found in the New Forest, Hampshire, United Kingdom, on 15 October 1990.

== Ecology ==
Certain species of deer consume this type of mushroom.

== Cultivation ==
Compared with species such as Agaricus bisporus (Swiss Brown mushroom) and the oyster mushroom, commercial cultivation of Laetiporus occurs at a much smaller and less mechanized scale.

== Uses ==
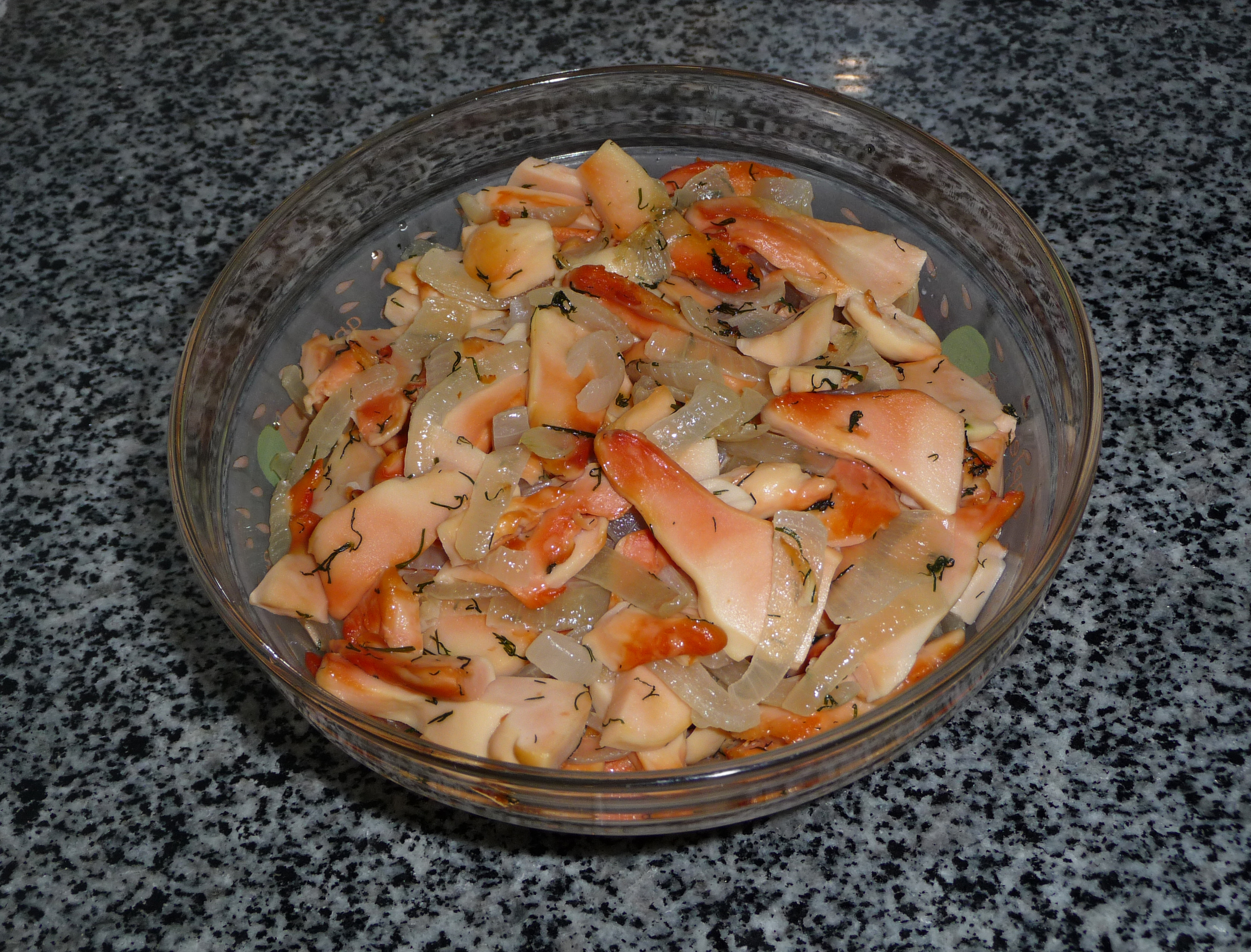
Prepared dish, with onions

Due to its taste, Laetiporus sulphureus has been called the chicken polypore and chicken-of-the-woods (not to be confused with Grifola frondosa, the so-called hen-of-the-woods).

Many people think that the mushroom tastes like crab or lobster leading to the nickname lobster-of-the-woods. The authors of Mushrooms in Color said that the mushroom tastes good sauteed in butter or prepared in a cream sauce served on toast or rice. It is highly regarded in Germany and North America.

Young specimens are edible if they exude large amounts of a clear to pale yellow watery liquid. Only the young outer edges of larger specimens should be collected, as older portions tend to be tough, unpalatable, and bug-infested. The mushroom should not be eaten raw.

=== Adverse effects ===
Some people have experienced gastrointestinal upset after eating this mushroom, and it should not be consumed raw.

Severe adverse reactions can occur, including vomiting and fever, in about 10% of the population, but this is now thought to be the result of confusion with morphologically similar species such as Laetiporus huroniensis, which grows on hemlock trees, and L. gilbertsonii, which grows on Eucalyptus.

== Bioactivity ==
The fungus produces the Laetiporus sulphureus lectin (LSL), which exhibits haemolytic and haemagglutination activities. Haemolytic lectins are sugar-binding proteins that lyse and agglutinate cells. These biochemical activities are promoted when bound to carbohydrates.

== See also ==
- Polypore
