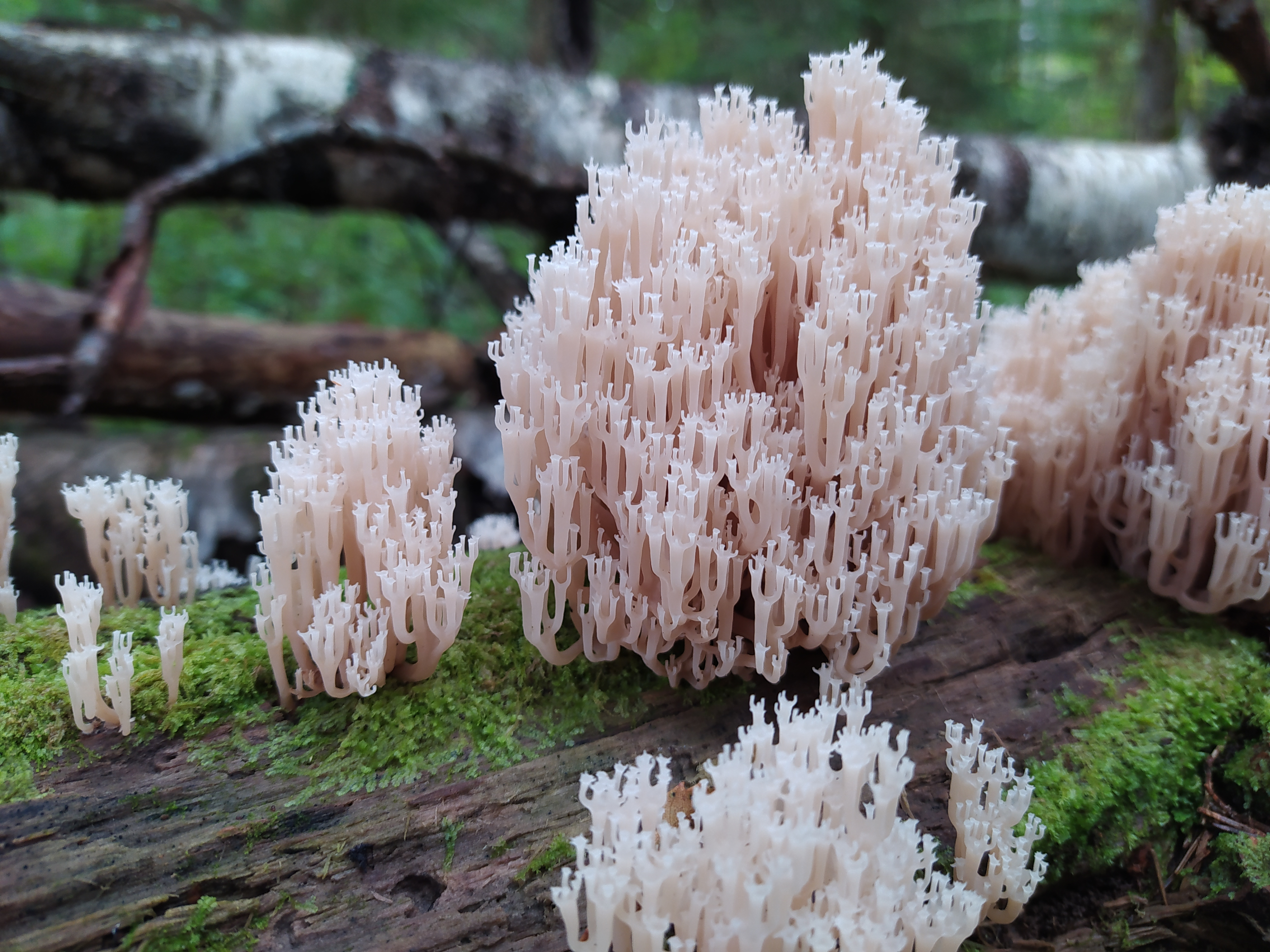

Scientific classification
- Domain: Eukaryota
- Kingdom: Fungi
- Division: Basidiomycota
- Class: Agaricomycetes
- Order: Russulales
- Family: Auriscalpiaceae
- Genus: Artomyces
- Species: A. pyxidatus

Binomial name
- Artomyces pyxidatus (Pers.) Jülich (1982)

Synonyms
- Clavaria pyxidata Pers. (1794); Merisma pyxidatum (Pers.) Spreng. (1827); Clavaria coronata Schwein. (1832); Clavaria petersii Berk. & M.A.Curtis (1873); Clavicorona coronata (Schwein.) Doty (1947); Clavicorona pyxidata (Pers.) Doty (1947)

= Artomyces pyxidatus =

Species of fungus

Artomyces pyxidatus Mycological characteristics
- Smooth hymenium
- No distinct cap
- Hymenium attachment is irregular or not applicable
- Lacks a stipe
- Spore print is white
- Ecology is saprotrophic
- Edibility is edible

Artomyces pyxidatus is a coral fungus that is commonly called crown coral or crown-tipped coral fungus. Its most characteristic feature is the crown-like shape of the tips of its branches. The epithet pyxidatus means "box-like"—a reference to this shape.

== Description ==
The hard, coral-like fruiting bodies reach 4–10 centimetres (1 1/2–4 in) tall. The colour ranges from cream to semi-tan. The branches rise in ringlike arrangements resembling a crown. Basidia and basidiospores are produced on the surfaces of the branches. The spore print is white.

The sesquiterpene compounds pyxidatols A-C, tsuicoline E and omphadiol have been obtained from the liquid culture of this fungus.

=== Similar species ===
DNA evidence and microscopy indicates that the species is closely related to members of the genera Russula and Lentinellus, as well as Auriscalpium vulgare. Artomyces piperatus is found on the North American West Coast. Other similar species include Clavulina avellanea, C. cristata, C. divaricata, C. piperata, and C. taxophila. Additionally, Ramaria stricta is similar but lacks crown-like tips.

== Distribution and habitat ==
In eastern North America, A. pyxidatus appears on decaying wood from June to September. It can be observed throughout Northern Canada during the growing season. In Britain, it was recorded in 2011, almost 116 years after its previous reliable report, a collection made by mycologist Carleton Reale on 20 October 1886. Two subsequent records have been provided in Britain since 2011; one by Yvonne Davidson in Kent in 2018, and one by Cameron Ambler in East Sussex in 2021. Found in Kent in 2023 It is widespread but uncommon in Western Europe. They are also widely found in the pine forest of northeastern India, known as the "eight sisters of India".

== Uses ==
Although usually found in insubstantial quantities, these fungi are considered edible raw, but are better cooked. According to one guide, it is best served when fried with chopped potatoes.

The fungus are known to be served as meal amongst the tribal groups of Northeast India since time immemorial.
