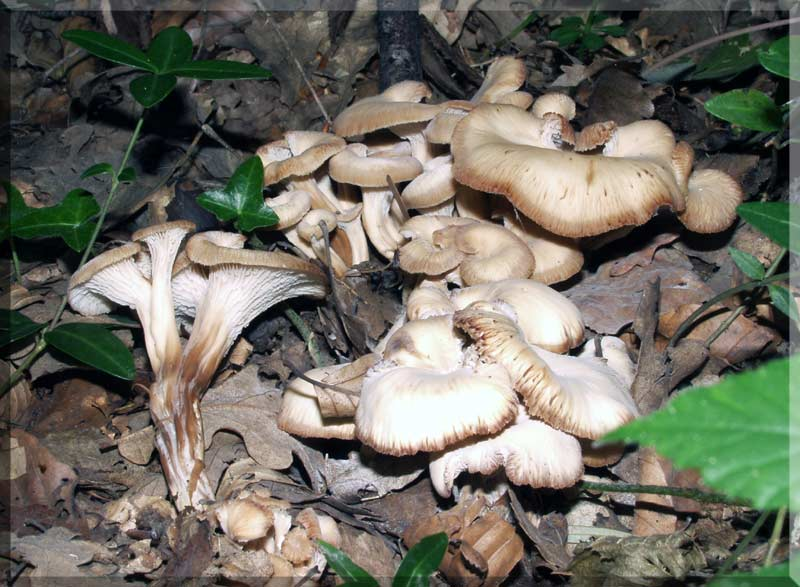

Scientific classification
- Domain: Eukaryota
- Kingdom: Fungi
- Division: Basidiomycota
- Class: Agaricomycetes
- Order: Russulales
- Family: Auriscalpiaceae
- Genus: Lentinellus
- Species: L. cochleatus

Binomial name
- Lentinellus cochleatus (Persoon) P. Karsten

= Lentinellus cochleatus =

Lentinellus cochleatus Mycological characteristics
- Gills on hymenium
- Cap is infundibuliform
- Hymenium is decurrent
- Stipe is bare
- Spore print is white
- Ecology is saprotrophic
- Edibility is inedible

Lentinellus cochleatus, commonly known as the aniseed cockleshell, is a wood-inhabiting fungus.

== Description ==
The tan cap grows up to 10 centimetres (4 in) wide, often with a darker margin and depressed in the center. It has a mild aniseed odor and flavor.

Similar species include Lentinellus micheneri and Crepidotus nyssicola.

== Distribution and habitat ==
It is widespready in Britain and the rest of Europe, on broadleaf wood, from July to December.

== Uses ==
Some consider all members of the genus inedible due to their bitterness, but one guide suggests that it is good cooked or dried as a seasoning.
