= Auriscalpium barbatum =

Scientific classification
- Kingdom: Fungi
- Division: Basidiomycota
- Class: Agaricomycetes
- Order: Russulales
- Family: Auriscalpiaceae
- Genus: Auriscalpium
- Species: A. barbatum

Binomial name
- Auriscalpium barbatum Maas Geest. (1978)

Species of fungus

Auriscalpium barbatum is a species of spine fungus in the family Auriscalpiaceae of the Russulales order. Found in Western Australia in 1977 embedded on fragments of humus in sandy soil, it was described as new to science by the Dutch mycologist Rudolph Arnold Maas Geesteranus in 1978.

== Taxonomy ==
Rudolph Arnold Maas Geesteranus described the fungus in 1978, from a collection made in August of the previous year in Fitzgerald River National Park, Western Australia. Based on the structure of the hyphae in their spines, Maas Geesteranus considered this species to be most closely related to the widespread Auriscalpium vulgare. The specific epithet barbatum derives from barbatum, meaning "spiny".

== Description ==
The fruit body has a circular cap about 2 cm (0.8 in) in diameter. The cap surface is smooth overall, dark brown with tinges of red, and has fine, radially arranged wrinkles. The stipe, which measures 15 mm (0.6 in) long by 3–5 mm thick, is slightly curved below and becomes slightly wider near the top. The crowded spines on the cap underside are up to 7 mm long. The spores are pip-shaped and covered with tiny spines, amyloid, colourless, and measure 5.8–6.3 by 3.8–4.7 μm. The basidia (spore-producing cells) are club shaped with clamps at their bases, four-spored with sterigmata up to 4.5 μm long, and have dimensions of 22–25 by 5.5–7 μm. The cap tissue consists of generative hyphae, thick-walled skeletal hyphae, and some oleiferous (lipid-containing) hyphae.

== Habitat and distribution ==
The fungus is only known from the type collection, a single specimen that was found growing on pieces of humus in sandy soil in an open area. Eucalyptus tetragona trees were growing nearby.
