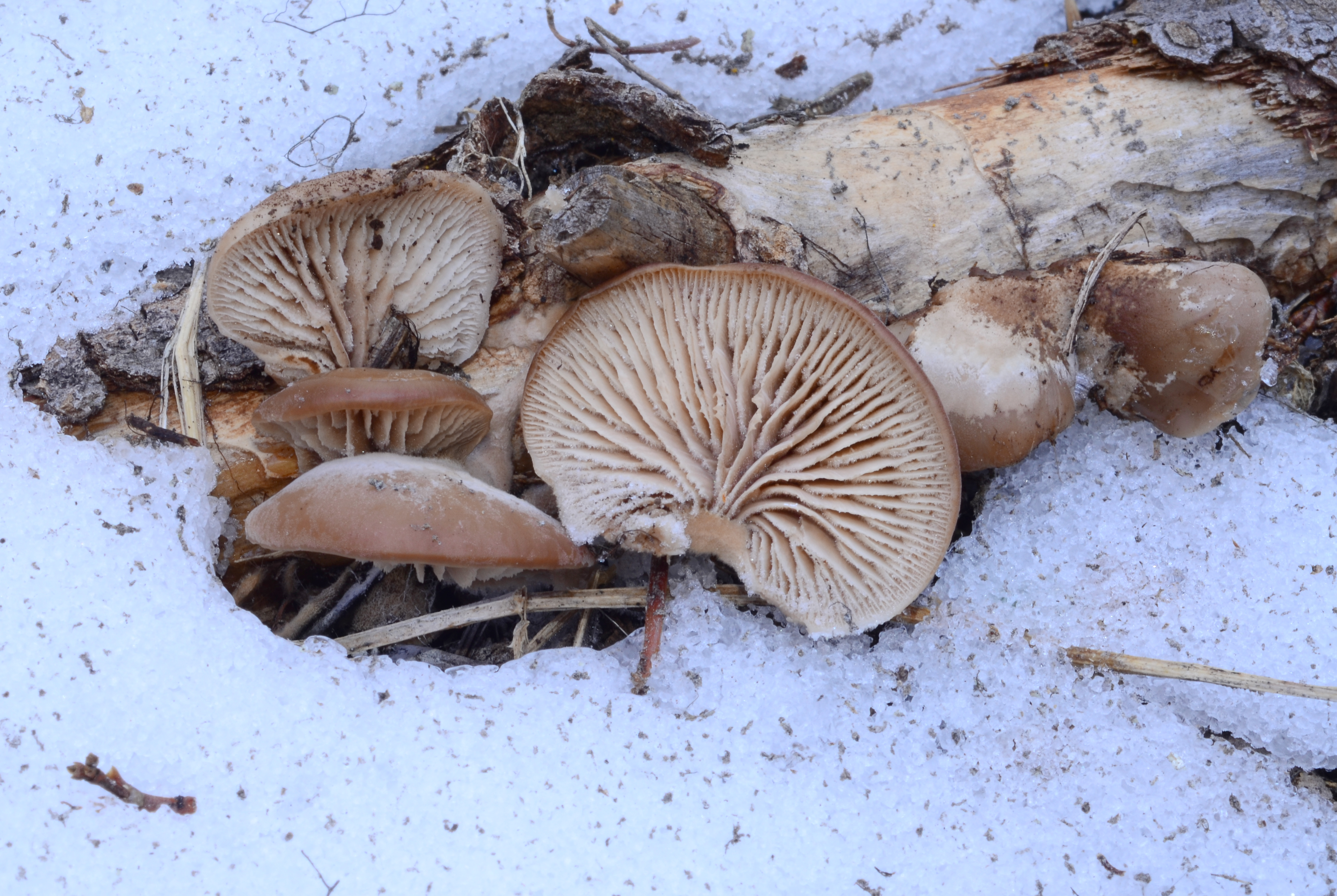

Scientific classification
- Domain: Eukaryota
- Kingdom: Fungi
- Division: Basidiomycota
- Class: Agaricomycetes
- Order: Russulales
- Family: Auriscalpiaceae
- Genus: Lentinellus
- Species: L. montanus

Binomial name
- Lentinellus montanus O.K.Mill. (1965)

= Lentinellus montanus =

Species of fungus

Lentinellus montanus is a species of agaric fungus in the family Auriscalpiaceae. It is found at high elevations in the Pacific Northwest region of North America, where it fruits singly or in clumps on decaying conifer wood.

== Taxonomy ==
The species was officially described by American mycologist Orson K. Miller in 1965. The type collection was made in McCall, Idaho on June 26, 1963.

== Description ==
The fruit bodies of Lentinellus montanus are sessile, meaning that they lack a stipe and grow directly on the substrate. The shell-shaped to fan-shaped cap measures 4–11 cm (1 5/8–4 3/8 in) in diameter. It is dark brown to red brown in color, except for the margins, which are light cinnamon to pale pinkish-buff. It is moist (but not sticky), somewhat hairy to shaggy in the center of the cap but smooth elsewhere. The gills are broad, somewhat distantly spaced, and interspersed with long lamellulae (gills that do not extend completely from the stipe to the cap margin). They have coarsely serrated edges, and a color ranging from white with purplish tints initially to buff in maturity. The tough flesh is light brown and 1–4 mm thick, with a mild to slightly aromatic odor and a mild to somewhat acrid taste.

Fruit bodies produce a cream to buff spore print. The spores are egg-shaped to roughly spherical, thick-walled, shell-shaped to fan-shaped, and measure 4.5–6.5 by 4–5 μm. Blunt spikes cover the spore surface. The basidia (spore-bearing cells) are club-shaped, four-spored, and measure 20–47 by 5.2–8 μm.

Like all species in its genus, it is inedible due to its bitterness.

== Habitat and distribution ==
Lentinellus montanus is a white rot fungus. Its fruit bodies grow singly, or, more commonly, in clusters on decaying conifer wood at elevations between 5,000–10,000 feet (1,500–3,000 m). Recorded tree substrates include Engelmann spruce (Picea engelmannii), Shasta red fir (Abies magnifica var. shastensis), subalpine fir (Abies lasiocarpa), and Pinus contorta. The fungus mycelium has also been found growing on fire wounds on living trees of Engelmann spruce and Lodgepole pine (Pinus contorta), where it attacks the springwood and causes small pockets of rot.

A snowbank mushroom, L. montanus fruits near melting snow banks, typically in the spring and early summer (May to July). The species occurs in northern and central Rocky Mountains east to the Cascade Range and south to Utah. Other states in which it has been recorded include Washington, Idaho, Montana, Colorado, Wyoming, and California.

== Similar species ==
Lentinellus ursinus is similar.
