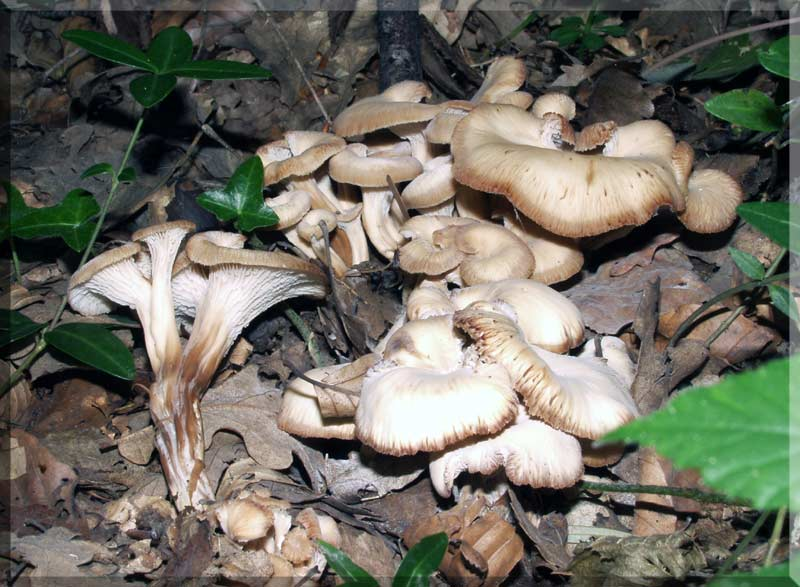
- Lentinellus cochleatus

Scientific classification
- Kingdom: Fungi
- Division: Basidiomycota
- Class: Agaricomycetes
- Order: Russulales
- Family: Auriscalpiaceae
- Genus: Lentinellus; P.Karst (1879)

Type species
- Lentinellus cochleatus (Fr.) P.Karst (1879)

Species
- 15, see text

Synonyms
- Hemicybe P.Karst. (1879); Lentinaria Pilát (1941)

= Lentinellus =

Genus of fungi

Lentinellus is a genus of white rot, wood decay, lamellate agaric in the family Auriscalpiaceae, further characterized in part by rough-walled, amyloid spores produced on lamellae with jagged edges. Typically, thick-walled hyphae in the fruit body are in part amyloid, and frequently the taste of the mushrooms is acrid (burning, spicy). The widespread genus has been estimated to contain 15 species. Mycologists Ronald Petersen and Karen Hughes considered 24 species in their 2004 world monograph of the genus.

== Classification and naming ==
The name Lentinellus is the diminutive of Lentinus, which is the generic name for another group of wood-decay fungi with rough lamellar edges. The type species and the best-known is L. cochleatus, which was classified under Lentinus by Persoon in 1825. Later it was realized that the species now in Lentinellus are very different in other characteristics from the other Lentinus species, and in modern taxonomy the groups are put into different orders (Lentinus is in Polyporales whereas Lentinellus is in Russulales).

Closely allied genera are Auriscalpium and Dentipratulum, with Artomyces slightly more distantly related. These groups are non-agaricoid but, strangely enough, Lentinellus is more closely related to them than to other gilled mushrooms.

== Ecology and uses ==
Fungi of this genus have been recorded as occasional food of the pleasing fungus beetle Triplax californica.

All species in the genus are unfit for human consumption due to their bitter taste.

== Species ==
- Lentinellus bissus
- Lentinellus brunnescens
- Lentinellus calyciformis
- Lentinellus castoreus
- Lentinellus cochleatus
- Lentinellus crawfordii
- Lentinellus dimidiatus
- Lentinellus flabelliformis
- Lentinellus jilinensis
- Lentinellus laurocerasi
- Lentinellus micheneri
- Lentinellus montanus
- Lentinellus novae-zelandiae
- Lentinellus omphalomorphus
- Lentinellus pulvinulus
- Lentinellus semivestitus
- Lentinellus tridentinus
- Lentinellus ursinus
- Lentinellus vulpinus
