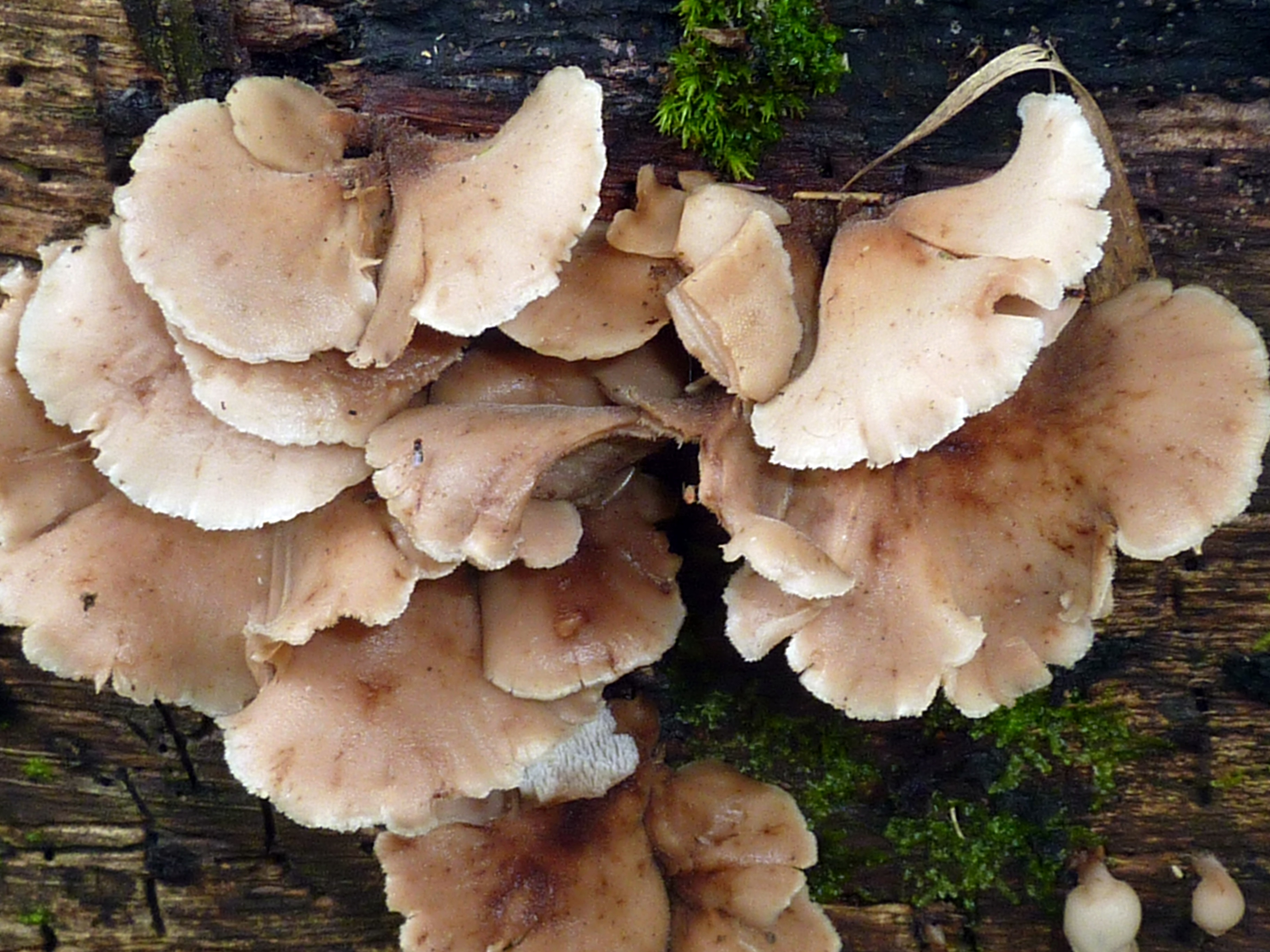

Scientific classification
- Kingdom: Fungi
- Division: Basidiomycota
- Class: Agaricomycetes
- Order: Russulales
- Family: Auriscalpiaceae
- Genus: Auriscalpium
- Species: A. villipes

Binomial name
- Auriscalpium villipes (Lloyd) Snell & E.A.Dick 1958

Synonyms
- Hydnum ursinum Lloyd (1916); Hydnum villipes Lloyd (1918); Hydnum platense Speg. (1926)

= Auriscalpium villipes =

Species of fungus

Auriscalpium villipes is a species of fungus in the family Auriscalpiaceae of the Russulales order. It is a spine fungus that grows on dead wood, and is found in Brazil and Mexico.
