= Auriscalpium gilbertsonii =

Scientific classification
- Kingdom: Fungi
- Division: Basidiomycota
- Class: Agaricomycetes
- Order: Russulales
- Family: Auriscalpiaceae
- Genus: Auriscalpium
- Species: A. gilbertsonii

Binomial name
- Auriscalpium gilbertsonii Ryvarden (2001)

Species of fungus

Auriscalpium gilbertsonii is a species of fungus in the family Auriscalpiaceae of the Russulales order. Found in Costa Rica, it was described as new to science by Norwegian mycologist Leif Ryvarden in 2001.
