= Auriscalpium andinum =

Scientific classification
- Kingdom: Fungi
- Division: Basidiomycota
- Class: Agaricomycetes
- Order: Russulales
- Family: Auriscalpiaceae
- Genus: Auriscalpium
- Species: A. andinum

Binomial name
- Auriscalpium andinum (Pat.) Ryvarden (2001)

Synonyms
- Hydnum andinum Pat. (1895)

Species of fungus

Auriscalpium andinum is a species of fungus in the family Auriscalpiaceae of the Russulales order. Originally described in 1895 as Hydnum andinum by Narcisse Théophile Patouillard, it was transferred to the genus Auriscalpium in 2001 by Leif Ryvarden. It is found in Ecuador.
