= Auriscalpium umbella =

Scientific classification
- Kingdom: Fungi
- Division: Basidiomycota
- Class: Agaricomycetes
- Order: Russulales
- Family: Auriscalpiaceae
- Genus: Auriscalpium
- Species: A. umbella

Binomial name
- Auriscalpium umbella Maas Geest. (1971)

Species of fungus

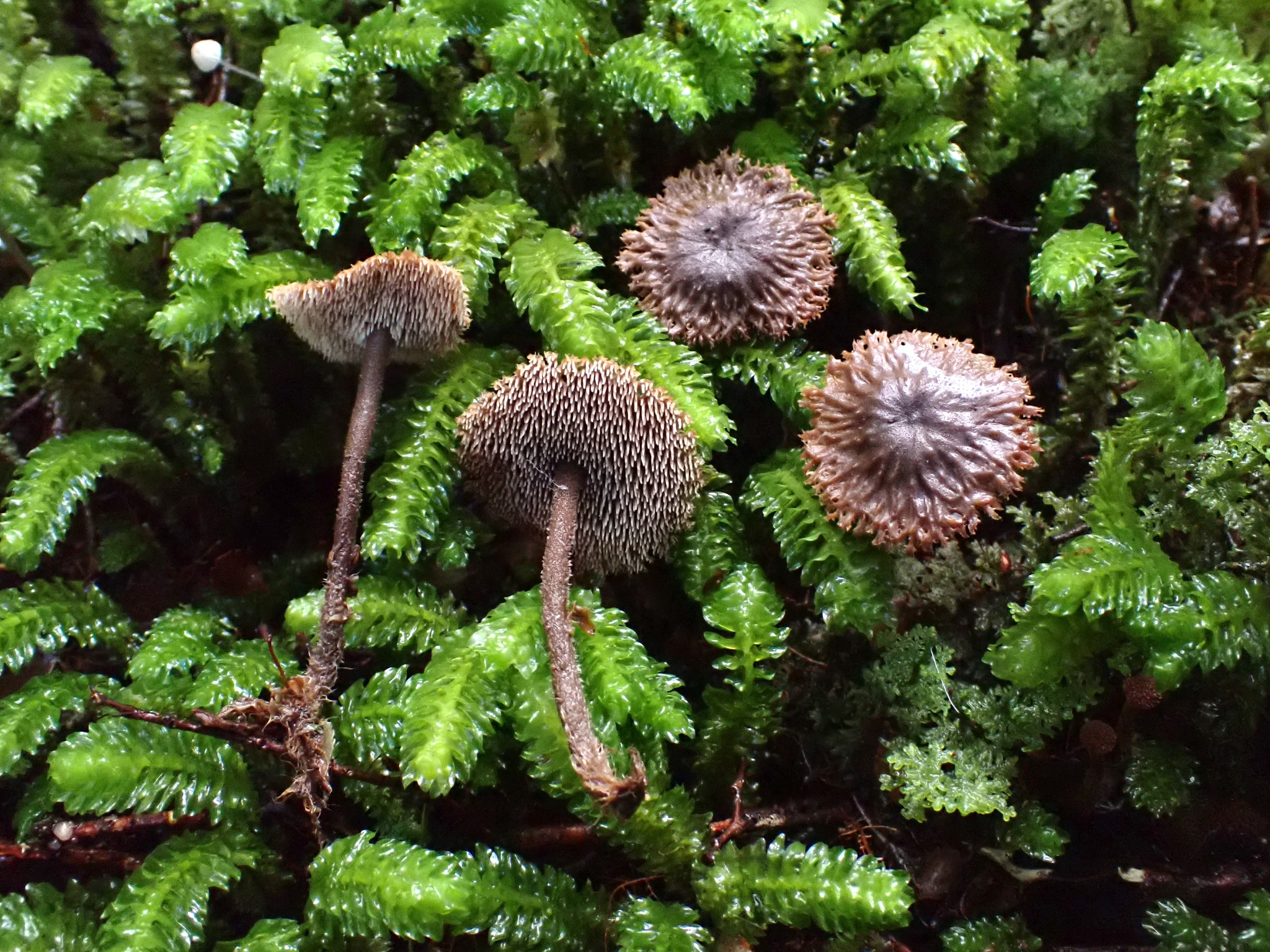
Photograph of Auriscalpium umbella fungi

Auriscalpium umbella is a species of fungus in the family Auriscalpiaceae of the Russulales order. It was described by the Dutch mycologist Rudolph Arnold Maas Geesteranus in 1971.

In 2001, it was only confirmed to be known in one location in New Zealand, the type location in Silverstream, Wellington. Recent observations as of October 2026 place it in both the North and South Islands of New Zealand.

It is found growing on the ground in moss clusters. It has a yellow-brown to dark-brown cap, typically smooth and bare. Spines are present on the underside of the cap. It is around 4.5cm (1.8 in) high.
