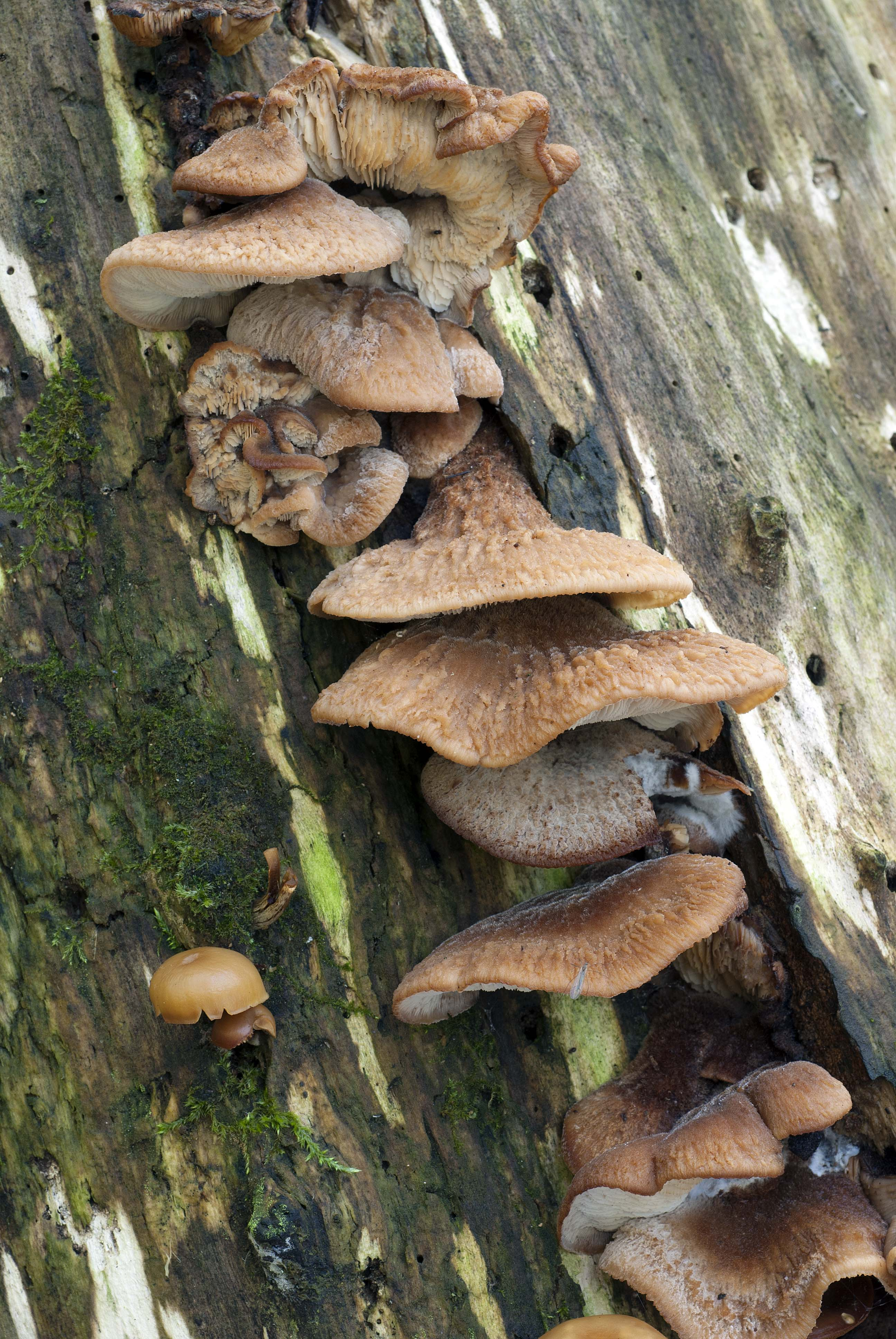

Scientific classification
- Domain: Eukaryota
- Kingdom: Fungi
- Division: Basidiomycota
- Class: Agaricomycetes
- Order: Russulales
- Family: Auriscalpiaceae
- Genus: Lentinellus
- Species: L. vulpinus

Binomial name
- Lentinellus vulpinus (Sowerby) Kühner & Maire

Synonyms
- Agaricus vulpinus Sowerby (1802); Lentinus vulpinus (Sowerby) Fr. (1836); Hemicybe vulpina (Sowerby) P.Karst., Bidr. Känn. (1879); Panellus vulpinus (Sowerby) Murrill (1915); Lentinus auricula Fr., Öfvers. K.Svensk. (1862); Hemicybe auricula (Fr.) P.Karst., Bidr. Känn. (1879); Pocillaria auricula (Fr.) Kuntze (1891); Lentinus vulpinus f. auricula (Fr.) Pilát (1946); Lentinellus auricula (Fr.) E.Ludw. (2001); Lentinus castoreus var. pusillus Berk. & M.A.Curtis (1868); Lentinus vulpinus f. pusillus (Berk. & M.A.Curtis) Pilát (1941); Hemicybe auricula var. robusta P.Karst. (1883); Lentinus auricula var. robustus (P.Karst.) Sacc. (1887); Lentinellus ursinus f. robustus (P.Karst.) R.H.Petersen (2004)

= Lentinellus vulpinus =

Species of fungus

Lentinellus vulpinus is a species of fungus belonging to the family Auriscalpiaceae.

It has a cosmopolitan distribution. Like all species in its genus, it is inedible due to its bitterness.
