= Auriscalpium luteolum =

Scientific classification
- Kingdom: Fungi
- Division: Basidiomycota
- Class: Agaricomycetes
- Order: Russulales
- Family: Auriscalpiaceae
- Genus: Auriscalpium
- Species: A. luteolum

Binomial name
- Auriscalpium luteolum (Fr.) P.Karst. (1879)

Synonyms
- Hydnum luteolum Fr. (1874); Leptodon luteolus (Fr.) Quél. (1886); Pleurodon luteolus (Fr.) Bourdot & Galzin (1928); Mycoleptodon luteolus (Fr.) Bourdot (1932)

Species of fungus

Auriscalpium luteolum is a species of fungus in the family Auriscalpiaceae of the Russulales order. First described as Hydnum luteolum by Elias Magnus Fries in 1874, it was transferred to the genus Auriscalpium by Petter Karsten in 1879.
