= Auriscalpium dissectum =

Scientific classification
- Kingdom: Fungi
- Division: Basidiomycota
- Class: Agaricomycetes
- Order: Russulales
- Family: Auriscalpiaceae
- Genus: Auriscalpium
- Species: A. dissectum

Binomial name
- Auriscalpium dissectum Maas Geest. & Rammeloo (1979)

Species of fungus

Auriscalpium dissectum is a species of fungus in the family Auriscalpiaceae of the Russulales order. Found in Zaire, it was described as new to science in the year 1979.
