= Artomyces nothofagi =

Conservation status
- Endangered (IUCN 3.1)

Scientific classification
- Kingdom: Fungi
- Division: Basidiomycota
- Class: Agaricomycetes
- Order: Russulales
- Family: Auriscalpiaceae
- Genus: Artomyces
- Species: A. nothofagi

Binomial name
- Artomyces nothofagi M.E.Sm. & Kneal (2015)

Species of fungus

Artomyces nothofagi is a species of coral fungus in the family Auriscalpiaceae. Found in southern Chile, it was described as new to science in 2015 by Richard Kneal and Matthew Smith. The specific epithet nothofagi refers to the substrate it grows on, Nothofagus dombeyi. The species distinguished from other Artomyces species by a combination of smooth spores, largely unbranched fruitbodies, and gloeocystidia that extend beyond the hymenium. Molecular phylogenetic analysis confirms A. nothofagi species is genetically distinct from other members of its genus.
