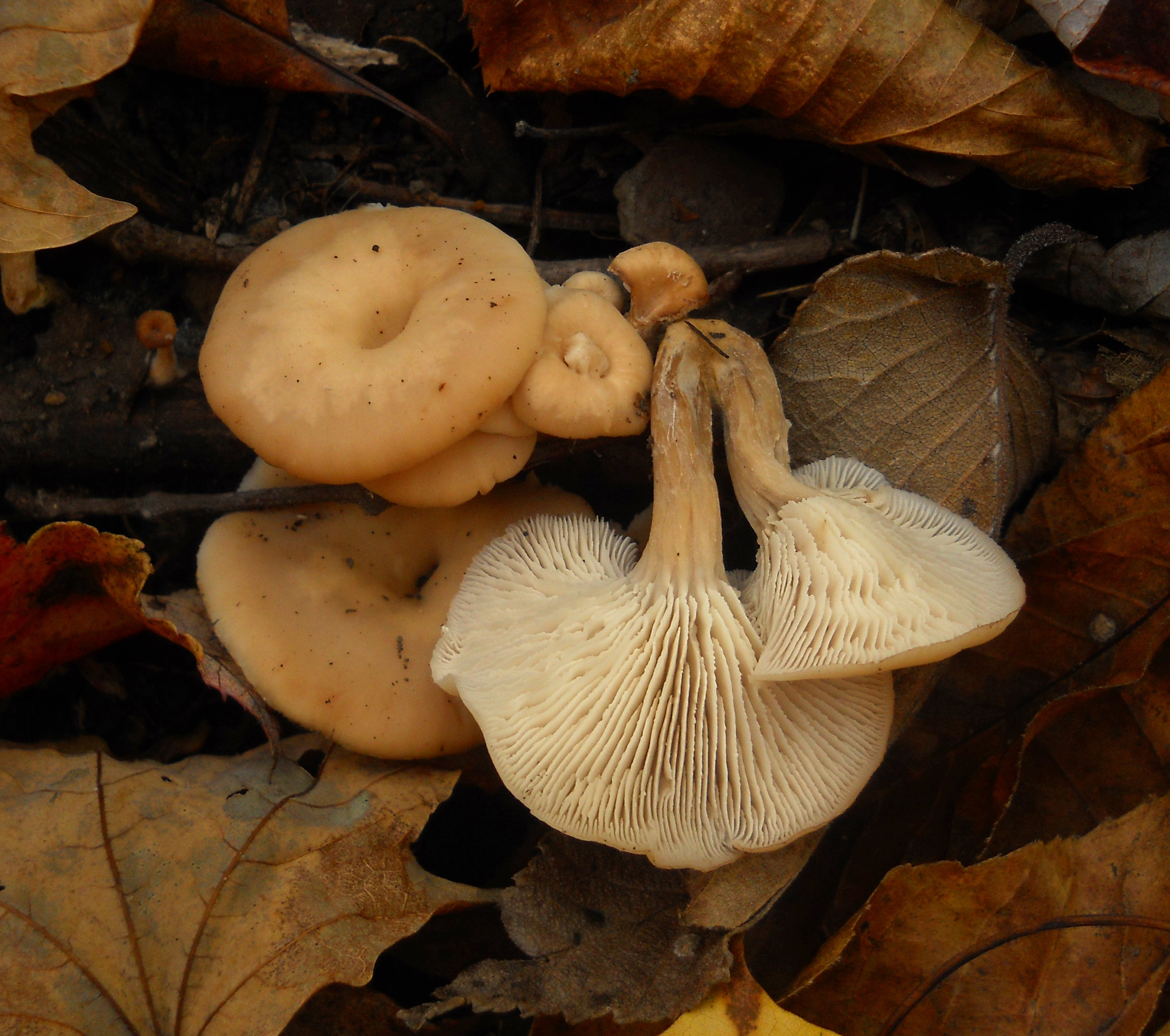

Scientific classification
- Domain: Eukaryota
- Kingdom: Fungi
- Division: Basidiomycota
- Class: Agaricomycetes
- Order: Russulales
- Family: Auriscalpiaceae
- Genus: Lentinellus
- Species: L. micheneri

Binomial name
- Lentinellus micheneri (Berk. & M.A.Curtis) Pegler (1983)

Synonyms
- Lentinus micheneri Berk. & M.A.Curtis (1853); Lentinellus bisus; Lentinellus omphalodes

= Lentinellus micheneri =

Species of fungus

Lentinellus micheneri is a species of wood-inhabiting fungus in the family Auriscalpiaceae. It was first described in 1853 by mycologist Miles Berkeley and Moses Ashley Curtis as Lentinus micheneri. David Pegler transferred it to the genus Lentinellus in 1983.

The pale tan caps are roundish, centrally depressed, and 5–30 millimetres (1/4–1 1/4 in) wide. The stems are 1–3 mm (1/16–1/8 in).

it may resemble other species of Lentinellus, especially L. subaustralis, for which microscopy is required to reliably distinguish. It may also resemble Neolentinus kauffmanii.

Like all species in its genus, L. micheneri is inedible.
