= Aleurocystidiellum =

Scientific classification
- Kingdom: Fungi
- Division: Basidiomycota
- Class: Agaricomycetes
- Order: Russulales
- Family: Stereaceae
- Genus: Aleurocystidiellum; P.A.Lemke (1964)

Type species
- Aleurocystidiellum subcruentatum (Berk. & M.A.Curtis) P.A.Lemke (1964)

Species
- Aleurocystidiellum disciforme (DC.) Tellería 1990; Aleurocystidiellum subcruentatum (Berk. & M.A.Curtis) P.A.Lemke 1964; Aleurocystidiellum tsugae (Yasuda) S.H.He & Y.C.Dai 2017

Genus of fungi

Aleurocystidiellum is a fungal genus of uncertain familial placement in the order Russulales. The type species, Aleurocystidiellum subcruentatum is a crust fungus that was first described in 1860 by Miles Berkeley and Moses Ashley Curtis. Aleurocystidiellum was circumscribed by Paul Arenz Lemke in 1964.

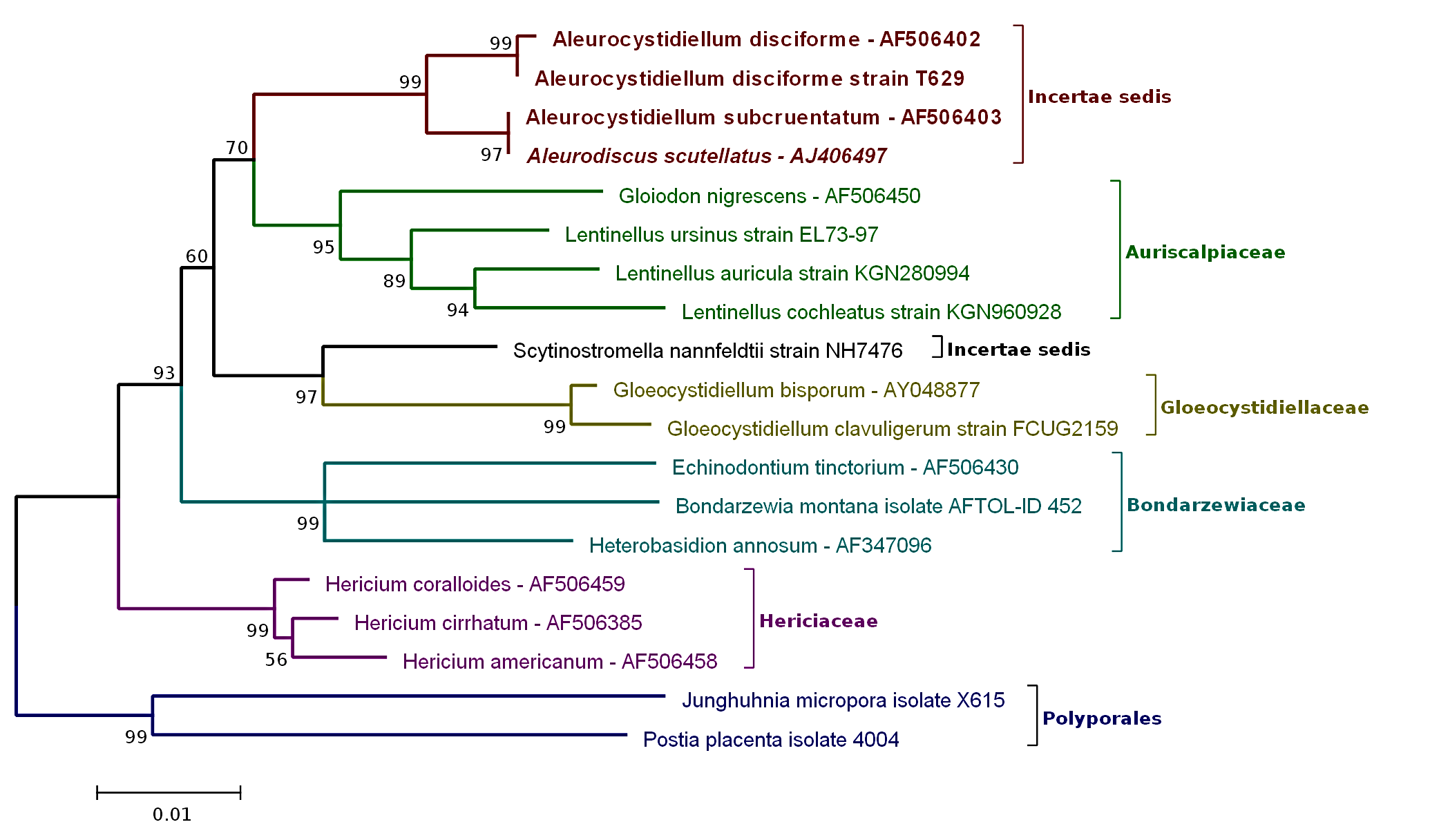
Minimum Evolution Tree of Genus Aleurocystidiellum (ribosomal RNA gene, 5.8S (partial), ITS-2 28S (partial)) The evolutionary history was inferred using the Minimum Evolution method. The optimal tree with the sum of branch length = 0.32675511 is shown. The confidence probability (multiplied by 100) that the interior branch length is greater than 0, as estimated using the bootstrap test (1000 replicates is shown next to the branches. The tree is drawn to scale, with branch lengths in the same units as those of the evolutionary distances used to infer the phylogenetic tree. The evolutionary distances were computed using the Maximum Composite Likelihood method and are in the units of the number of base substitutions per site. The ME tree was searched using the Close-Neighbor-Interchange (CNI) algorithm at a search level of 2. The Neighbor-joining algorithm was used to generate the initial tree. The analysis involved 19 nucleotide sequences. All positions with less than 95% site coverage were eliminated. That is, fewer than 5% alignment gaps, missing data, and ambiguous bases were allowed at any position. There were a total of 843 positions in the final dataset. Evolutionary analyses were conducted in MEGA5. Phylogenetic and molecular evolutionary analyses were conducted using MEGA version 5 (Tamura, Peterson, Peterson, Stecher, Nei, and Kumar 2011). All sequences were obtained from the Genbank and were aligned by the Muscle algorithm with standard settings.
