= Amylonotus =

Scientific classification
- Kingdom: Fungi
- Division: Basidiomycota
- Class: Agaricomycetes
- Order: Russulales
- Family: Auriscalpiaceae
- Genus: Amylonotus; Ryvarden

Type species
- Amylonotus africanus

Genus of fungi

Amylonotus is a genus of mushrooms in the family Auriscalpiaceae. It was first described by Norwegian mycologist Leif Ryvarden in 1975.
