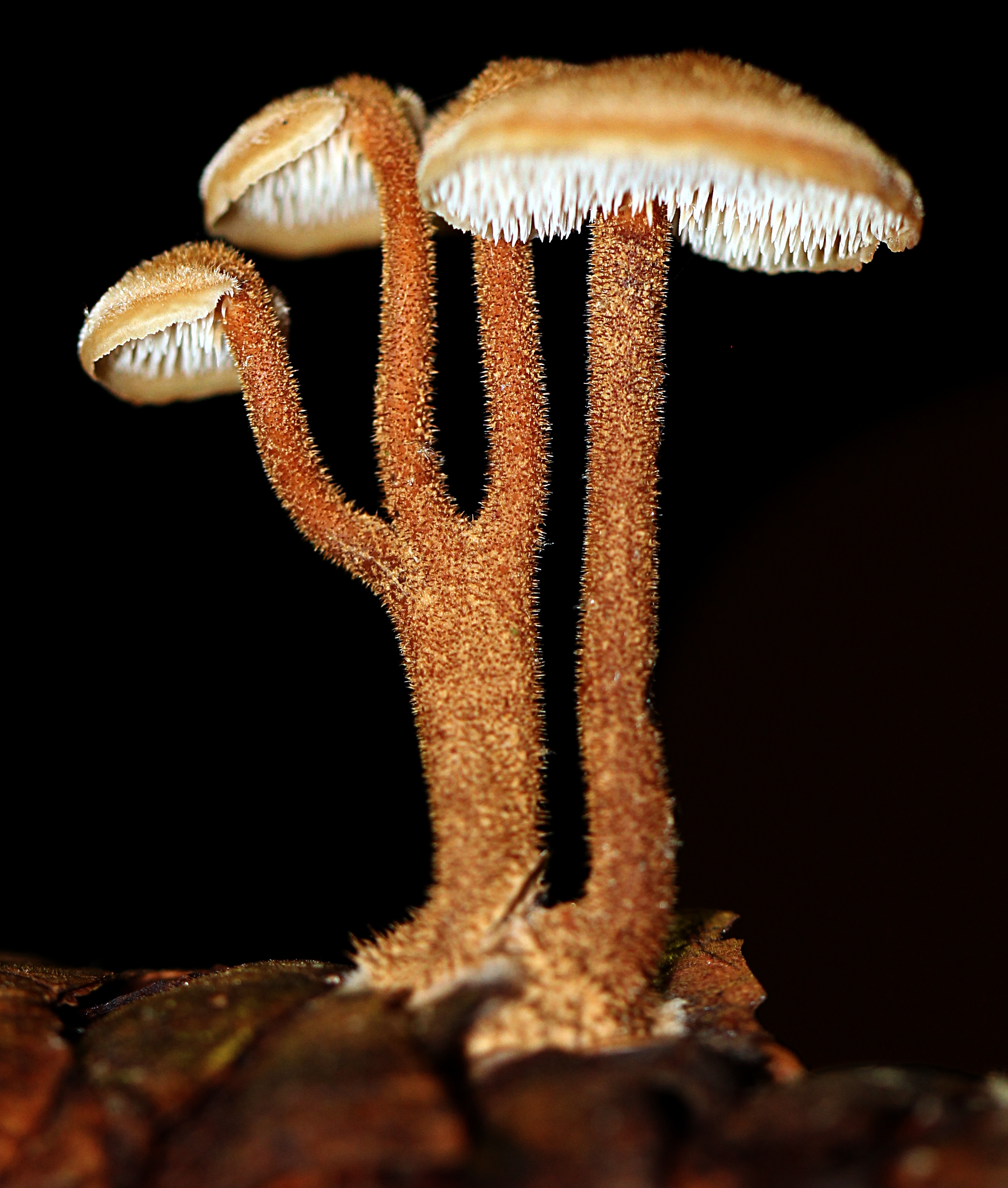

Scientific classification
- Kingdom: Fungi
- Division: Basidiomycota
- Class: Agaricomycetes
- Order: Russulales
- Family: Auriscalpiaceae
- Genus: Auriscalpium
- Species: A. vulgare

Binomial name
- Auriscalpium vulgare Gray (1821)

Synonyms
- List: Hydnum auriscalpium L. (1753); Scutiger auriscalpium (L.) Paulet (1812); Pleurodon auriscalpium (L.) P.Karst. (1881); Leptodon auriscalpium (L.) Quél. (1886); Hydnum atrotomentosum Schwalb (1891); Auriscalpium auriscalpium (L.) Kuntze (1898); Auriscalpium auriscalpium (L.) Banker (1906); Hydnum fechtneri Velen. (1922); Pleurodon fechtneri (Velen.) Cejp (1928); Auriscalpium fechtneri (Velen.) Nikol. (1964)

= Auriscalpium vulgare =

Species of inedible European fungi

Auriscalpium vulgare
- Mycological characteristics
- Teeth on hymenium
- Cap is offset
- Hymenium is adnexed
- Stipe is bare
- Spore print is white
- Ecology is saprotrophic
- Edibility is inedible

Auriscalpium vulgare, commonly known as the pinecone mushroom, the cone tooth, or the ear-pick fungus, is a species of fungus in the family Auriscalpiaceae of the order Russulales. It was first described in 1753 by Carl Linnaeus, who included it as a member of the tooth fungi genus Hydnum, but British mycologist Samuel Frederick Gray recognized its uniqueness and in 1821 transferred it to the genus Auriscalpium that he created to contain it.

The fruit bodies (mushrooms) grow on conifer litter or on conifer cones that may be partially or completely buried in soil. The dark brown cap of the small, spoon-shaped mushroom is covered with fine brown hairs, and reaches a diameter of up to 2 cm (3/4 in). On the underside of the cap are a crowded array of tiny tooth-shaped protrusions ("teeth") up to 3 mm long; they are initially whitish to purplish-pink before turning brown in age. The dark brown and hairy stem, up to 55 mm (2 1/8 in) long and 2 mm thick, attaches to one edge of the cap. The mushroom produces a white spore print out of roughly spherical spores.

High humidity is essential for optimum fruit body development, and growth is inhibited by either too much or too little light. Fruit bodies change their geotropic response three times during their development, which helps ensure that the teeth ultimately point downward for optimum spore release. The pure culture, cell division and the ultrastructure of A. vulgare's hyphae and mycelia have been studied and described in search of potentially useful characters for phylogenetic analysis. When grown in culture, the fungus can be induced to produce fruit bodies under suitable conditions.

The fungus is widely distributed in Europe, Central America, North America, and temperate Asia. Although common, its small size and nondescript colors lead it to be easily overlooked in the pine woods where it grows. A. vulgare is not generally considered edible, owing to its tough texture.

== Taxonomy ==
The species was first described in the scientific literature by Carl Linnaeus under the name Hydnum auriscalpium in his 1753 Species Plantarum. Linnaeus placed three other tooth fungi in the genus Hydnum: H. imbricatum, H. repandum, and H. tomentosum. In 1821, Samuel Frederick Gray considered H. auriscalpium to be sufficiently distinct from the other Hydnum species to warrant the creation of a new genus, Auriscalpium, to contain it. In the process, its name was changed to Auriscalpium vulgare.

- - - - - Gloiodon strigosus
        - Gloiodon nigrescens
      - Auriscalpium vulgare
    - Dentipratulum bialoviesense
  - Various Lentinellus spp.

Cladogram showing the phylogeny of A. vulgare and other Russulales species based on rDNA sequences.

Otto Kuntze and Howard James Banker later independently sought to restore Linnaeus' species name, but the resulting combination (Auriscalpium auriscalpium) is a tautonym and disallowed under the rules for botanical nomenclature (ICBN 2005 rule 23.4), and these combinations are therefore no longer validly published. Other names given to the fungus and now considered synonyms include Hydnum fechtneri, named by Josef Velenovský in 1922, and later combinations based on this name. A. vulgare is the type species of the widely distributed genus of eight species that it belongs to. Despite vast differences in appearance and morphology, A. vulgare is related to such varied taxa as the gilled fungi of Lentinus, the poroid genus Albatrellus, the coral-like Clavicorona, and fellow tooth fungus Hericium. The relationship of all of these taxa—members of the family Auriscalpiaceae of the order Russulales—has been demonstrated through molecular phylogenetics.

Auriscalpium vulgare is commonly known as the "pinecone mushroom", the "cone tooth", "pine cone tooth", or the "ear-pick fungus". Gray called it the "common earpick-stool"; it was also referred to as the "fir-cone Hydnum", when it was still considered to be a member of that genus. The specific epithet vulgare means "common". The generic name Auriscalpium is Latin for "ear pick" and refers to a small, scoop-shaped instrument used to remove foreign matter from the ear.

== Description ==
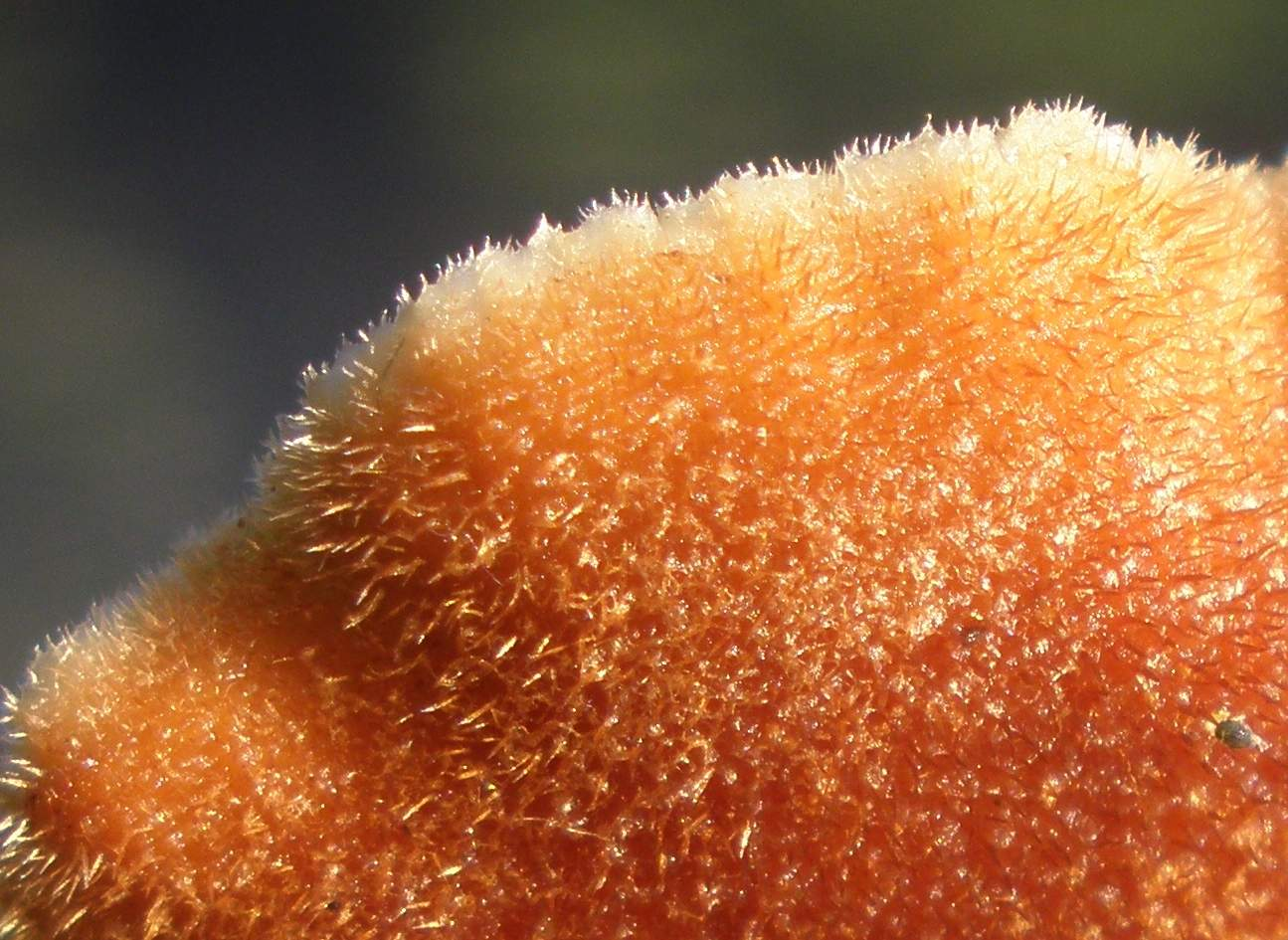
The cap surface is bristly when young.

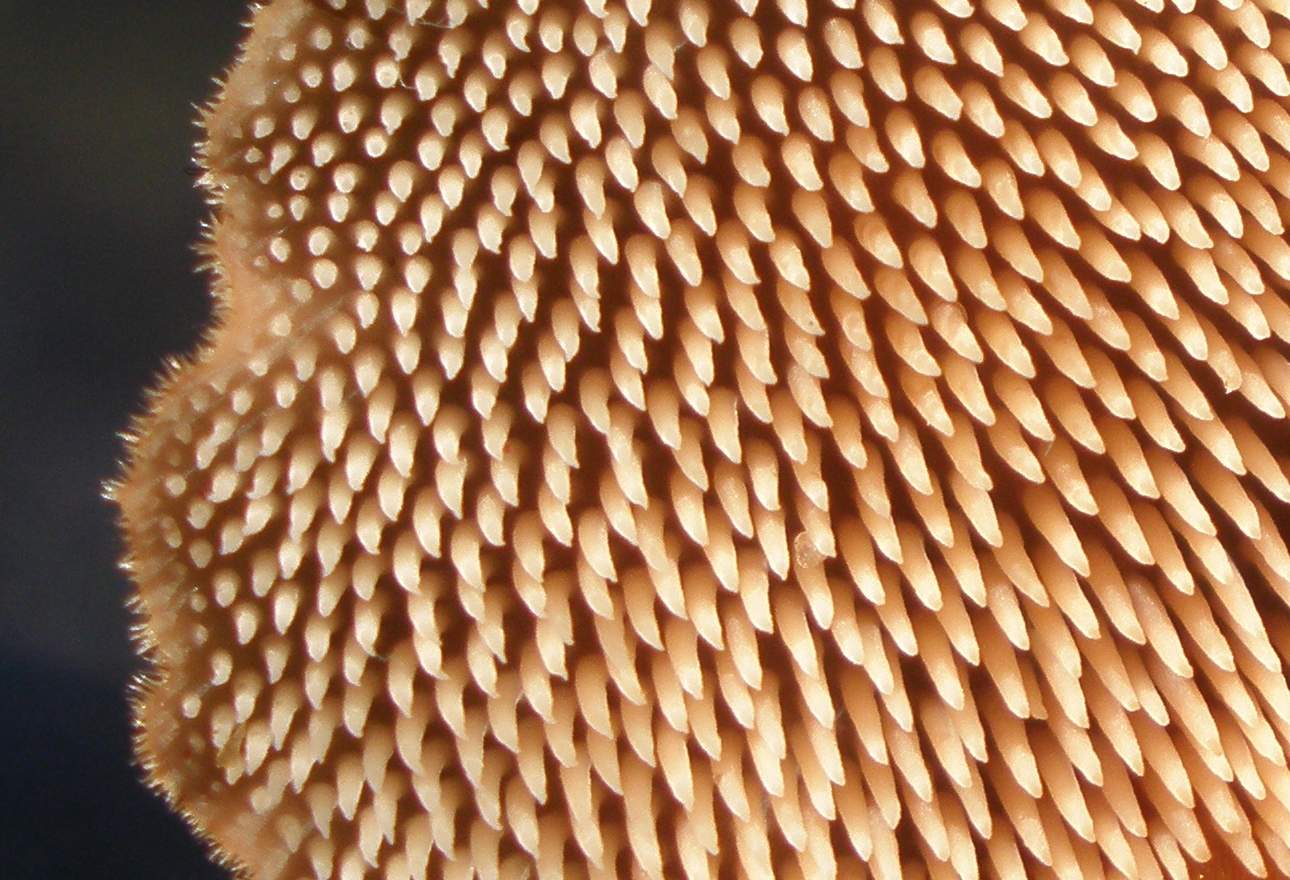
The spore-bearing surface features teeth up to 3 mm long.

The fruit body of A. vulgare is fibrous when fresh and becomes stiff when dry. It is a small species rarely exceeding 5.5 cm (2 1/4 in) in height, with a cap usually smaller than an adult's fingernails: 0.5 to 2 cm (1/4 to 3/4 in)—although it has been known to reach up to 4 cm (1 1/2 in). It is semicircular or kidney-shaped, flat on the lower surface and rounded on the top. The surface is at first much like the stem: covered with bristles and dark chestnut brown. It becomes smooth with maturity and can darken to the point of being almost black. The cap margin is usually buff to light brown–roughly the same color as the spines and lighter in color than the center. It becomes rolled inward (revolute) and often wavy in maturity. The spines on the underside of the cap are a few millimeters long and cylindrical down to their sharp tips. White to light brown when young, they later become covered with a white spore mass and then turn an ashy gray. Occasionally, fruit bodies are produced that lack a cap entirely.

Auriscalpium vulgare usually has a single stem, but occasionally several stems arise from a thick common base. It attaches to the side of the cap and is cylindrical or slightly flattened with a bulbous base, 2–8 cm tall and 1–3 wide. Its surface is covered with hairy fibers, and its mature color is a dark chestnut brown.

"... the mushroom look(s) like a little periscope sent up from a pine-cone submarine."

— Michael Kuo

The cap flesh is composed of two distinct layers: a thin, compact, black-brown and hairy upper layer, and a thick, soft, white to light brown lower layer that is made of thin, thread-like filaments arranged in a roughly parallel fashion. The stem is similarly divided, with a thin, dark and hairy cortical layer covered by hairs, which encircles inner ochre-colored flesh. A drop of potassium hydroxide applied to the surface of the mushroom will cause it to instantly stain black.

The mushroom has no distinct taste or odor, is generally considered inedible because of its toughness and diminutive size. An 1887 textbook noted, however, that it was "commonly eaten in France and Italy".

=== Microscopic characteristics ===
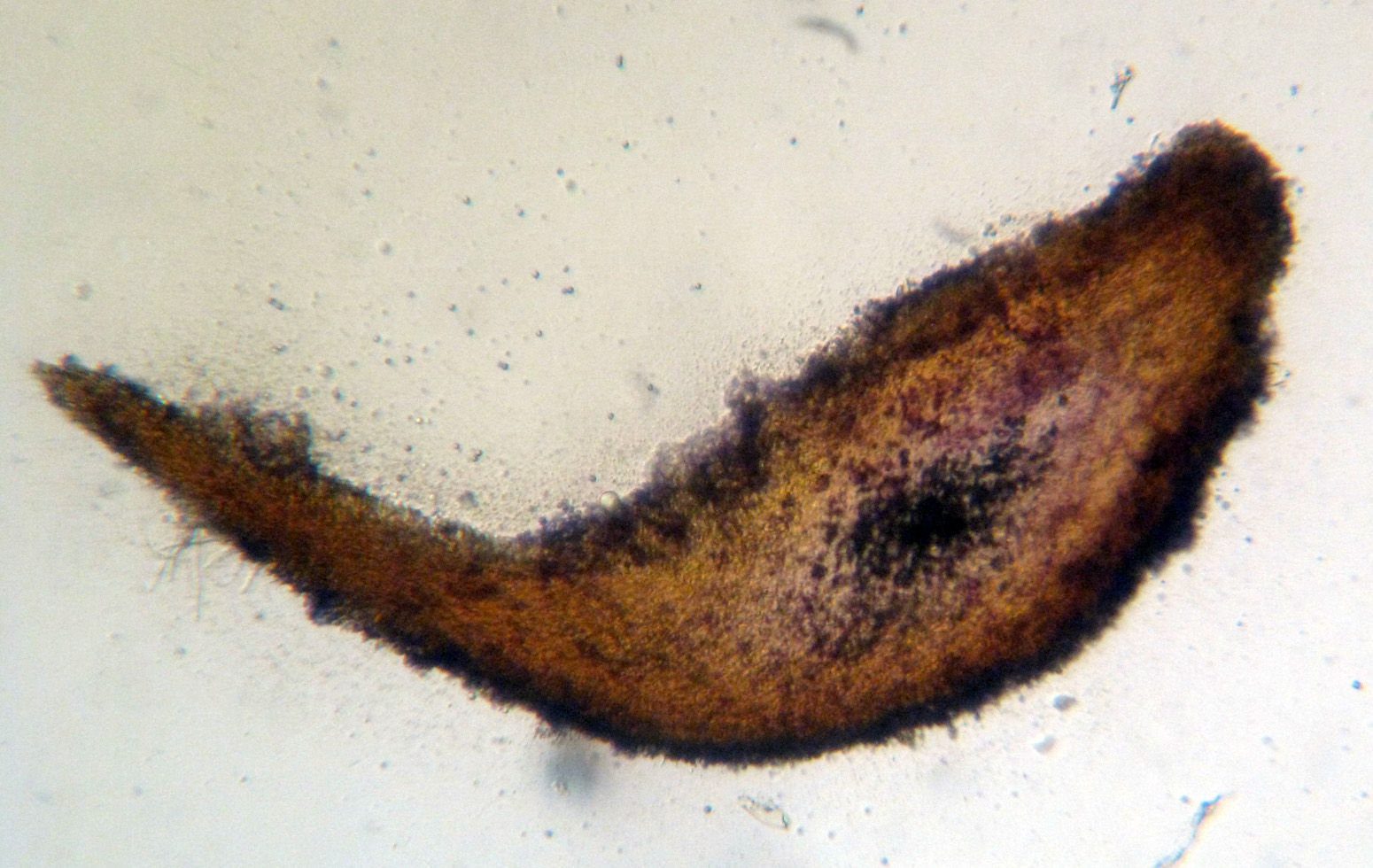
Microscopy image of a tooth at 100x magnification, stained with Melzer's reagent

In deposit, the spores are white. Viewed under a light microscope, the spores appear hyaline (translucent), covered with minute wart-like bumps, and are spherical or nearly so, with dimensions of 4.6–5.5 by 4–5 μm. They are amyloid (reacting to Melzer's reagent) and cyanophilous (staining in methyl blue). The basidia (spore-bearing cells of the hymenium) are four-spored with basal clamps, and measure 15–24 by 3–4 μm, and sterigmata (extensions of the basidia that bear the spores) are swollen at the base and roughly 3 μm long. The hyphal system is dimitic, comprising both generative (undifferentiated) and skeletal (structural) hyphae. The thin-walled generative hyphae are hyaline, and have clamp connections; the thick-walled skeletal hyphae are thicker overall and lack such connections. The cortex (the tougher outer layer of flesh) is made of parallel unbranched generative hyphae that are brown, thick-walled, clumped together, and frequently clamped. The internal flesh is made of interwoven generative and skeletal hyphae. Gloeoplerous hyphae (containing oily or granular contents) are also present, protruding into the hymenium as club-like or sharp-pointed gloeocystidia.

The hyphae of basidiomycetous fungi are partitioned by cross-walls called septa, and these septa have pores that permit the passage of cytoplasm or protoplasm between adjacent hyphal compartments. In an effort to determine ultrastructural characters useful for systematic and phylogenetic analyses of the Agaricomycotina, Gail Celio and colleagues used electron microscopy to examine both the structure of the septal pore, and nuclear division in A. vulgare. They determined that septa found in hyphae of the hymenium have bell-shaped pore "caps" with multiple perforations. Each cap extends along the length of the septum, along with a zone surrounding the pore that is free of organelles. Due to the scarcity of similar data from other Agaricomycotina species, it is unknown whether the extended septal pore cap margins of A. vulgare are phylogenetically informative. Regarding nuclear division, the process of metaphase'' ''I of meiosis is similar to the metaphase of mitosis. Spherical spindle pole bodies containing electron-opaque inclusions are set within gaps on opposite ends of the nuclear membrane. This membrane has occasional gaps but is largely continuous. Fragments of endoplasmic reticulum occur near the spindle pole bodies, but do not form a cap.

=== Fruit body development ===
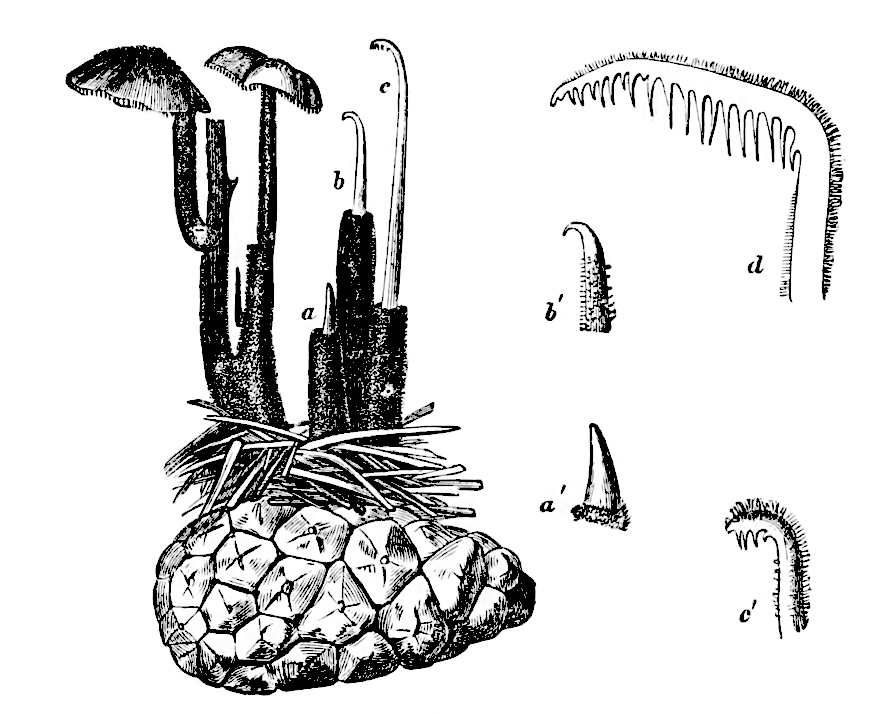
Growth on a fir cone; the inset images depict the cap at different stages of development. Illustrated by Eugenius Warming.

Fruit body primordia first appear between the scales of the cones, and require 9 to 35 days to reach their final height. They consist of an inner core of thin-walled generative hyphae enclosed by an outer coat of skeletal hyphae. Immature fruit bodies are white and delicate, but gradually become brown as they mature. Because the cap is grown from the stem tip after it bends, cap development interrupts stem growth, and this shift to centrifugal growth (that is, growth outward from the stem) results in the typical kidney-shaped or semicircular cap. Although the fruit body takes at least 9 days to mature, spores production begins within 48–72 hours of the start of cap growth. Spines start out as minute protuberances on the part of the stem adjoining the undersurface of the cap. As the cap enlarges, these spines are spread horizontally, and more protuberances are formed, which elongate vertically downwards.

When grown in favorable conditions of high water availability and humidity, the fruit body can proliferate by growing additional (secondary) fruit bodies on all parts of its upper and lower surfaces. These secondary growths typically number between four and seven; some may be aborted as the nutrients from the pine cone substrate are depleted, resulting in stems lacking caps. In one instance, a complete secondary proliferation was noted (i.e., growing from a primary proliferation) that developed completely so as to produce viable spores. Humidity is a limiting factor for optimum fruit body development. Removal of incompletely mature laboratory-grown specimens from a relative humidity (R.H.) of over 98% to one of 65–75% causes the fruit bodies to brown and stop growing. When transferred to an even lower R.H. of about 50%, the stems quickly begin to collapse. Light also affects fruit body development: both continuous illumination and complete darkness inhibit growth.

When a stem is developing, the fungus is negatively geotropic, so that if the axis of the stem is tilted by 90 degrees, it will return to a vertical position within 24 hours. The extending hyphae that form the cap are themselves diageotropic—they will grow at right angles to the direction of gravity. Finally, the spines are positively geotropic, and will re-orient themselves to point downward if the mushroom orientation changes. Because the second (cap formation) and third (spine formation) geotropic responses overlap, there is a brief period where two different geotropic responses are operating simultaneously. These geotropic transitions help ensure that the final alignment results in optimum spore dispersal.

=== Similar species ===
Similar species include Strobilurius trullisatus, which also fruits on Douglas-fir cones. Baeospora myosura fruits on spruce cones, and Mycena purpureofusca on pine cones.

== Habitat and distribution ==
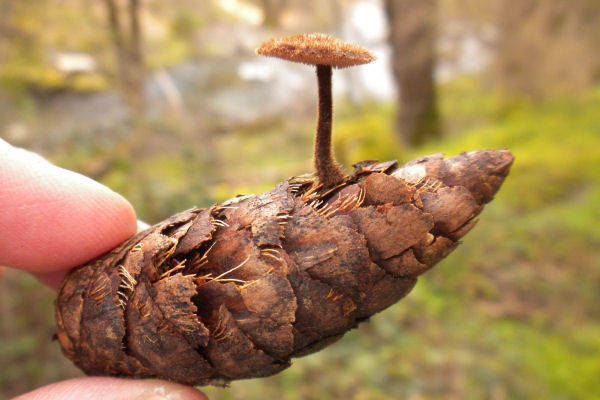
Growing on a Douglas-fir cone

Auriscalpium vulgare is a saprobic species. Its mushrooms grow solitary or clustered on fallen pine cones, especially those that are fully or partially buried. It typically favors Scots pine (Pinus sylvestris), but has also been reported on spruce cones, and in California grows primarily on Douglas-fir cones. One author noted finding the mushroom on spruce needles on top of squirrel dens where cone bracts were present in the forest floor. In a study conducted in the Laojun Mountain region of Yunnan, China, A. vulgare was found to be one of the most dominant species collected from mixed forest at an altitude of 2,600–3,000 m (8,500–9,800 ft). A study on the effect of slash and burn practices in northeast India showed that the fungus prefers to fruit on burned cones of the Khasi pine, and that the number of fruit bodies on unburned cones increases with cone girth.

The fungus is widely distributed in Europe, Central and North America, temperate Asia, and Turkey. In North America, its range extends from Canada to the Trans-Mexican Volcanic Belt south of Mexico City. The mushroom is common, appearing in the summer and autumn, although it is easily overlooked because of its small size and nondescript coloration. A. vulgare is the only representative of its genus in temperate areas of the Northern Hemisphere.

== Growth in culture ==
Auriscalpium vulgare can be grown in pure culture on agar-containing plates supplemented with nutrients. The colonies that grow are white to pale cream, and cover the agar surface within six weeks from the initial inoculation. The mycelium is made of bent-over hyphae, without any aerial hyphae (hyphae that extend above the surface of the agar). Typically, two indistinct zones develop at about 6 mm and 15 mm from the initial inoculum spot, with each zone roughly 4 mm wide. The zones appear somewhat lighter in color because the hyphae are more closely packed and form crystalline substances that deposit into the agar.

The mature mycelium consists of thin-walled, densely packed hyphae that are 1.5–3.2 μm in diameter. They are often gnarled or somewhat spiral (subhelicoid), and frequently branched at an angle of about 45°, with a clamp at the base of the branch. They contain amorphous granules that appear refractive when viewed under phase contrast microscopy, and their walls are often encrusted with tiny granules. Gloeocystidia (thin-walled cystidia with refractive, frequently granular contents) are common; they measure 50–85 by 6.5–8.5 μm, and are club-shaped (sometimes elongated), thin-walled, and often have one or two lobes with rounded tips. Containing foamy and pale yellow contents, they are a refractive yellow color under phase contrast. Initially they are erect but they soon fall under their own weight to lie on the agar surface. Crystalline deposits are abundant as small, randomly scattered plate-like or star-like crystals.

Fruiting begins about six weeks after the initial inoculation on the agar plate, but only when portions of fruit bodies (spines or stem sections) are used as the inoculum to initiate growth; the use of mycelium as the inoculum precludes subsequent fruiting. Mature fruit bodies grow very close to the initial site of inoculation—within 3 mm—and take about 60 days to mature after they first start to form.

== Edibility ==
The mushroom is generally considered inedible because of its toughness and diminutive size. A 1887 textbook claims that it was "commonly eaten in France and Italy".
