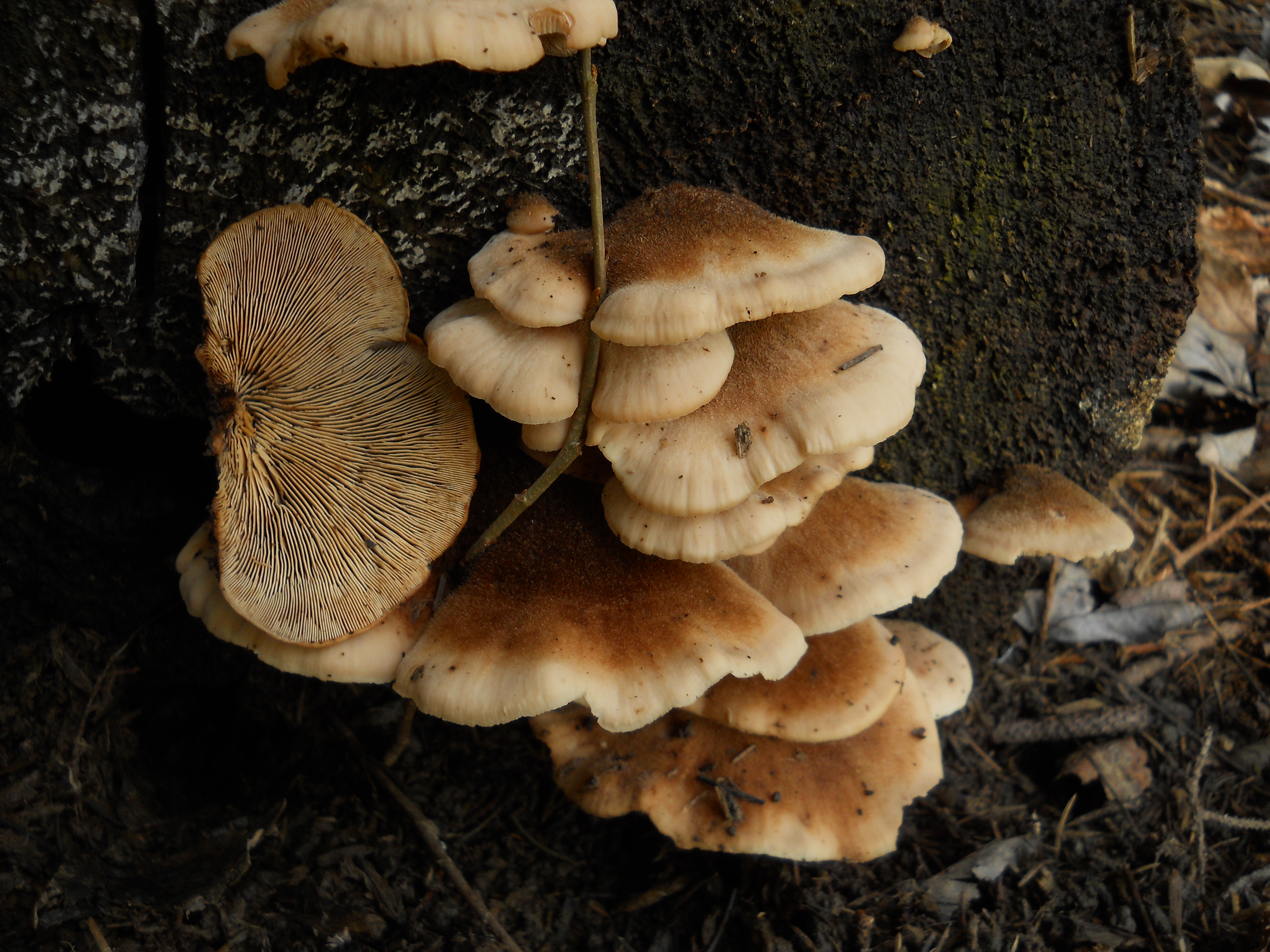

Scientific classification
- Kingdom: Fungi
- Division: Basidiomycota
- Class: Agaricomycetes
- Order: Russulales
- Family: Auriscalpiaceae
- Genus: Lentinellus
- Species: L. ursinus

Binomial name
- Lentinellus ursinus (Fr.) Kühner, 1926

Synonyms
- Agaricus ursinus Fr., 1821

= Lentinellus ursinus =

Species of fungus

Lentinellus ursinus is a species of fungus belonging to the family Auriscalpiaceae.

The caps are 2–10 centimetres (1–4 in) wide, often separated into lobes. They are brown in the center, fading to white at the margin. The spore print is white.

It may require microscopy to distinguish from L. angustifolius. Lookalikes from other genera include Pleurotus ostreatus.

It can be found in North America from October–March on the West Coast and July–October elsewhere.

Like all species in its genus, it is inedible due to its bitterness.
