= S. orientalis =

S. orientalis may refer to:

- Sarda orientalis, the striped bonito, a marine fish species found through the Eastern and Indo-Pacific
- Serapias orientalis, an orchid species found from the east-central and eastern Mediterranean to the western Transcaucasus
- Serrata orientalis, a sea snail species
- Shenzhousaurus orientalis, a basal ornithomimosaur species from the Lower Cretaceous of China
- Sinhalestes orientalis, a damselfly species endemic to Sri Lanka
- Stalpersia orientalis, a mushroom species
- Stigmella orientalis, a moth species found only on Kyushu, Japan
- Streptomyces orientalis, a bacterium species
- Synodus orientalis, a lizardfish species found mainly in the Northwest Pacific

== Synonyms ==
- Securigera orientalis, a synonym for Coronilla iberica, an ornamental plant species
- Steiracrangon orientalis, a synonym for Crangon crangon, a commercially important shrimp species found mainly in the southern North Sea, although also found in the Irish Sea, Baltic Sea, Mediterranean Sea and Black Sea, as well as off much of Scandinavia and parts of Morocco's Atlantic coast
- Strix orientalis, a synonym for Strix seloputo, the spotted wood-owl, an owl species found in many regions surrounding Borneo, but not on that island itself

== See also ==
- Orientalis (disambiguation)
