= Gloeohypochnicium =

Scientific classification
- Kingdom: Fungi
- Division: Basidiomycota
- Class: Agaricomycetes
- Order: Russulales
- Family: incertae sedis
- Genus: Gloeohypochnicium (Parmasto) Hjortstam (1987)

Type species
- Gloeohypochnicium analogum (Bourdot & Galzin) Hjortstam (1987)

Species
- Gloeohypochnicium analogum Gloeohypochnicium versatum

Synonyms
- Hypochnicium subgen. Gloeohypochnicium Parmasto (1968)

Genus of fungi

Gloeohypochnicium is a genus of wood-inhabiting crust fungi of uncertain familial placement in the order Russulales. Originally conceived by Erast Parmasto as a subgenus of Hypochnicium, Kurt Hjortstam considered it worthy of distinct generic status in 1987. The type species, G. analogum, was described as new to science in 1913 by French mycologists Hubert Bourdot and Amédée Galzin as a species of Gloeocystidium. G. versatum was added to the genus in 2010.
