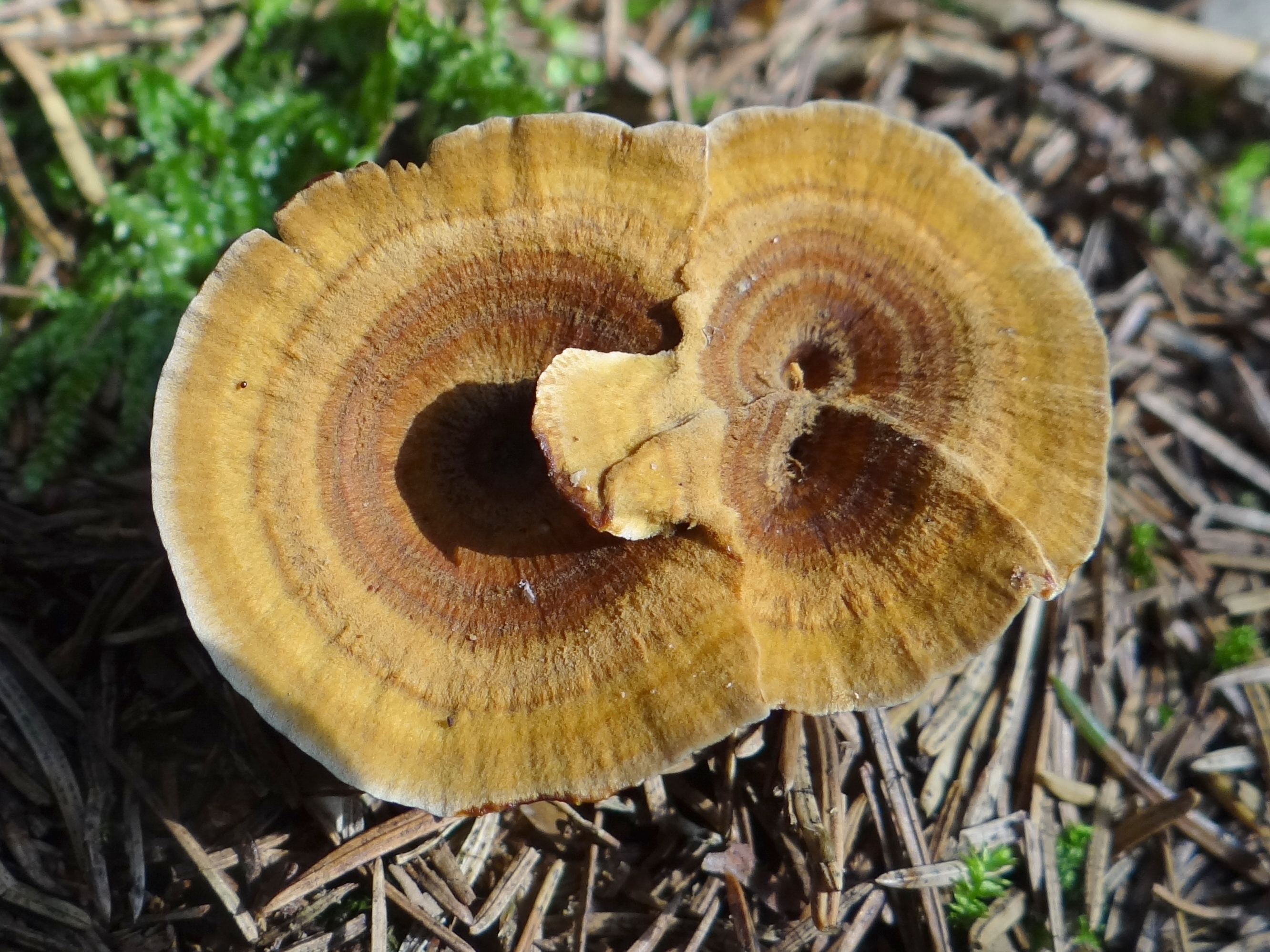
- Coltricia perennis

Scientific classification
- Kingdom: Fungi
- Division: Basidiomycota
- Class: Agaricomycetes
- Order: Hymenochaetales
- Family: Hymenochaetaceae
- Genus: Coltricia; Gray (1821)

Type species
- Coltricia connata Gray (1821)

Synonyms
- Coltriciella

= Coltricia =

Genus of fungi

Coltricia is a genus of fungi in the family Hymenochaetaceae. It was circumscribed by Samuel Frederick Gray in 1821. In 2022, it was combined with the genus Coltriciella.

== Species ==
- Coltricia abieticola
- Coltricia africana
- Coltricia albidipes
- Coltricia arenicola
- Coltricia australica
- Coltricia bambusicola
- Coltricia barbata
- Coltricia cinnamomea
- Coltricia confluens
- Coltricia crassa
- Coltricia cylindrospora
- Coltricia duportii
- Coltricia fibrosa
- Coltricia focicola
- Coltricia fonsecoensis
- Coltricia fragilissima
- Coltricia globispora
- Coltricia grandispora
- Coltricia hamata
- Coltricia haskarlii
- Coltricia insularis
- Coltricia kinabaluensis
- Coltricia macropora
- Coltricia minor
- Coltricia montagnei
- Coltricia oblectabilis
- Coltricia opisthopus
- Coltricia perennis
- Coltricia permollis
- Coltricia progressus
- Coltricia pseudocinnamomea
- Coltricia pyrophila
- Coltricia salpincta
- Coltricia spina
- Coltricia strigosa
- Coltricia strigosipes
- Coltricia subfastosa
- Coltricia subperennis
- Coltricia truncicola
- Coltricia tsugicola
- Coltricia velutina
- Coltricia verrucata
- Coltricia weii
