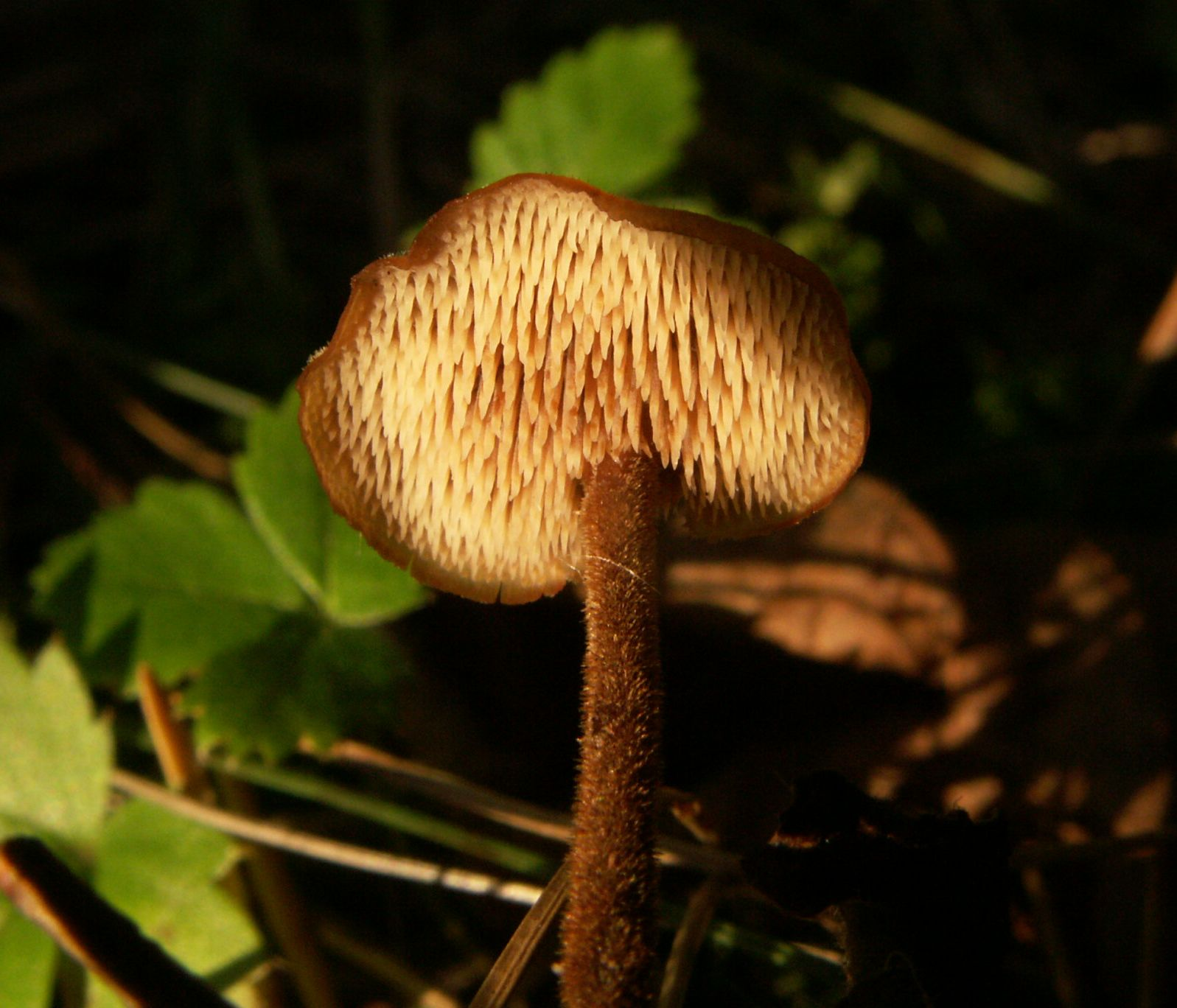
- Auriscalpium vulgare

Scientific classification
- Kingdom: Fungi
- Division: Basidiomycota
- Class: Agaricomycetes
- Order: Russulales
- Family: Auriscalpiaceae
- Genus: Auriscalpium; Gray (1821)

Type species
- Auriscalpium vulgare Gray (1821)

Species
- See text

Synonyms
- Pleurodon Quél. ex P.Karst. (1881)

= Auriscalpium =

Genus of fungi

Auriscalpium is a genus of mushroom-forming fungi typifying the family Auriscalpiaceae.

== Etymology ==
Auriscalpium is a compound of the Latin, auris, "ear"; and scalpo, "I scratch", generally meaning ear pick. The term was originally applied as a specific epithet by Linnaeus in 1753, viz. Hydnum auriscalpium and changed in 1821 to vulgare when S.F. Gray recognized the cone-inhabiting fungus as a new genus, named after its type species, Auriscalpium vulgare. Tautonyms, such as "Auriscalpium auriscalpium" are illegitimate under the International Code of Botanical Nomenclature.

== Taxonomy ==
The genus includes the following species:

- A. andinum
- A. barbatum
- A. dissectum
- A. gilbertsonii
- A. luteolum
- A. umbella
- A. villipes
- A. vulgare

== Description ==
Members of this genus are characterized by in part by rough-walled, amyloid spores that are produced on pendant spines, hence it is considered to be a tooth fungus. The type species, A. vulgare, is a common, easily identified fungus in the Northern Hemisphere found fruiting exclusively on mature, fallen, often buried conifer cones. Its wiry, long hairy stipe is topped by an eccentrically placed, shaggy pileus bearing the pendant, flexible, spore-bearing spines. The entire fructification resembles and perhaps could be used as an ear pick (see etymology above). Other species in the genus do not occur on cones or lack the eccentric pileus on a long stalk. According to the Dictionary of the Fungi (10th edition, 2008), the genus contains eight widely distributed species.
