= Stalpersia =

Scientific classification
- Kingdom: Fungi
- Division: Basidiomycota
- Class: Agaricomycetes
- Order: Russulales
- Family: Auriscalpiaceae
- Genus: Stalpersia; Parmasto

Type species
- Stalpersia orientalis Parmasto

Genus of fungi

Stalpersia is a genus of mushrooms in the family Auriscalpiaceae. The genus is monotypic, containing the single species Stalpersia orientalis.
