= Coltricia cinnamomea =

Scientific classification
- Kingdom: Fungi
- Division: Basidiomycota
- Class: Agaricomycetes
- Order: Hymenochaetales
- Family: Hymenochaetaceae
- Genus: Coltricia
- Species: C. cinnamomea

Binomial name
- Coltricia cinnamomea (Jacq.) Murrill (1904)

Synonyms
- List: Boletus cinnamomeus Jacq.; Strilia cinnamomea (Jacq.) Gray; Polyporus cinnamomeus (Jacq.) Pers.; Polystictus cinnamomeus (Jacq.) Sacc.; Pelloporus fimbriatus var. cinnamomeus (Jacq.) Quél.; Microporus cinnamomeus (Jacq.) Kuntze; Xanthochrous cinnamomeus (Jacq.) Pat.; Polystictus perennis f. cinnamomeus (Jacq.) Pilát; Polyporus parvulus Klotzsch; Polystictus parvulus Fr.; Polyporus biformis var. populi-balsamiferae Berk.; Polystictus bulbipes var. populi-balsamiferae (Berk.) Sacc.; Polystictus biformis var. populi-balsamiferae (Berk.) Sacc.; Polyporus cladonia Berk.; Polystictus bulbipes subsp. cladonia (Berk.) Sacc.; Polystictus cladonia (Berk.) Sacc.; Polyporus bulbipes var. cladonia (Berk.) Sacc.; Polyporus oblectans Berk.; Polystictus oblectans (Berk.) Cooke; Xanthochrous oblectans (Berk.) Pat.; Microporus oblectans (Berk.) Kuntze; Coltricia oblectans (Berk.) G. Cunn.; Polyporus bulbipes Fr.; Polystictus bulbipes (Fr.) Fr.; Microporus bulbipes (Fr.) Kuntze; Xanthochrous bulbipes (Fr.) Pat.; Microporus parvulus (Fr.) Kuntze; Xanthochrous parvulus (Fr.) Pat.; Coltricia parvula (Fr.) Murrill; Polyporus splendens Peck; Polyporus subsericeus Peck; Polystictus splendens Sacc.; Xanthochrous splendens Pat.; Polyporus perdurans Kalchbr.; Polystictus bulbipes subsp. perdurans (Kalchbr.) Sacc.; Polyporus bulbipes var. perdurans (Kalchbr.) Sacc.; Xanthochrous perdurans (Kalchbr.) Pat.; Polystictus perdurans (Kalchbr.) Bres.; Polystictus cinnamomeus var. lahorensis Lloyd; Polyporus baudysii Kavina; Polyporus casimiri Velen.; Coltricia perennis f. casimiri (Velen.) Pilát; Polystictus perennis f. casimiri (Velen.) Pilát; Polystictus cinnamomeus var. polycephalus Lloyd

Species of fungus

Coltricia cinnamomea, commonly known as the shiny cinnamon polypore, is an agaricomycete mushroom in the genus Coltricia. It is vase-shaped, with tough, leathery flesh and caps that are distinctly shiny with circular bands of brown. The hymenium is porous with circular to angular pores. It can often be found growing in clusters in hardwood canopies on packed soil, and sometimes on dead wood. This mushroom is globally distributed and has been described on every continent except Antarctica. C. cinnamomea may have unarticulated ecological significance considering its role as an ectomycorrhizal fungus and its ancient lineage, but its broader role in ecosystem functioning is still poorly understood.

== Taxonomy ==
Coltricia cinnamomea was first described as Boletus cinnamomeus by Nikolaus Joseph von Jacquin in 1786, in his major work, Collectanea ad Botanicam, Chemiam, et Historiam Naturalem spectantia, cum figuris. Later, in 1904, William Murrill placed it in the genus Coltricia.

Both the specific epithet, cinnamomea, and common name, shiny cinnamon polypore, derive from the cinnamon-brown color of the fruiting body.

=== Phylogeny ===
As mentioned, C. cinnamomea is part of the Coltricia genus. The genus as a whole, including C. cinnamomea, has been of interest because it is one of the only ectomycorrhizal genera in the hymenochaetoid clade, which is dominated by white rot, wood decaying saprobes. Some of its notable relatives include C. perennis, for which it is often mistaken, C. montagnei, C. focicola, C. dependens, and the newly described C. subcinnamomea. C. cinnamomea has been in some phylogenetic studies, mostly as a comparison species used to phylogenetically orient newly described species, but also due to interest in the ectomycorrhizal nature of its genus. One important phylogenetic note on C. cinnamomea specifically is that it has appeared strongly paraphyletic or polyphyletic in at least one major phylogenetic study, which suggests there are several cryptic species associated with it.

== Morphology ==
Coltricia cinnamomea is a stipate polypore with a vase or funnel shaped fruiting body, tough leathery flesh, and a 1–5 cm (0.39–1.97 in) cap. The stipe is centrally attached, and the hymenium is porous, yellowish-brown to cinnamon-brown, with small (2–4/mm (51–102/in)) circular to angular pores. When fresh, the basidiocarp will turn dark brown if bruised and the flesh will become brittle once it dries. It is often found growing in small groups. Inside its hymenium, C. cinnamomea has reproductive basidia with 6.5–8 × 5–6 µm basidiospores. The spore print is yellowish-brown and the basidiospores have been described as smooth, elliptic, and weakly dextrinoid. The basidiocarp turns black immediately in KOH and has only branched generative hyphae and no cystidia or setae.

=== Similar species ===
C. cinnamomea appears very similar to several other species in the Coltricia genus. It is most commonly mistaken for Coltricia perennis, also known as the Tiger's Eye mushroom. C. perennis has a similar distribution and morphology to C. cinnamomea, but it is, on average, larger and thicker, has a cap with more muted colors and distinct zoning, and is also more tomentose. It is often found in burn sites and in conifer woods. Compared to another similar species, Coltricia montagnei, C. cinnamomea can be identified by its more angular pores, velvety stipe, and never producing pseudo gills. A new species described in 2020, C. subcinnamomea, which is thought to be very closely related to C. cinnamomea, also shares some of its morphological characteristics, such as a shiny cap, but C. cinnamomea has smaller hyphae and smaller basidiospores.

== Distribution and ecology ==
C. cinnamomea is a cosmopolitan mushroom with a global distribution spanning Senegal, Europe, Asia, Australasia, Kenya, New Caledonia, and the Americas. As mentioned, C. cinnamomea is now thought to be ectomycorrhizal, though it was historically thought to be a saprobe because it is part of the hymenochaetoid clade, which is composed of mostly saprotrophic fungi that grow on wood. The Coltricia genus has been historically associated with wood (living trees or dead debris), thus, conscious efforts were made to establish the ectomycorrhizal nature of the genus. Several studies have provided strong evidence of ectomycorrhiza (EcM) in Coltricia and C. cinnamomea specifically. C. perennis, a close relative of C. cinnamomea, has been shown to lack wood decay enzymes present in other taxa in the clade, which points to EcM. In 1989, Thoen and Ba reported finding EcM of Coltricia cinnamomea on the hardwood tree, Uapaca guineensis Müll. Arg., in Senegal. Another study found several species of Coltricia ectomycorrhiza on Vateriopsis seychellarum, Intsia bijuga, and Eucalyptus robusta plant hosts. The same study suggests that the association of Coltricia with wood may be related to the fact that dead wood can be a stable and moist substrate for fungi with long-lived fruiting bodies. The authors, Tedersoo et al., (2007) sum up the history of Coltricia as an EcM well with the following sentence, "The panglobal distribution suggests that Coltricia-Coltriciella is an ancient taxon and members of this lineage likely form EcM associations in all continents. So far, their presence in below-ground EcM communities may have been simply overlooked". Thus, despite the genus level historic association with wood, C. cinnamomea is most likely ectomycorrhizal.

As an ectomycorrhizal fungus, C. cinnamomea gets its nutrients from symbiosis with plant hosts. In an EcM symbiosis, the fungus gets much of its nutrients from the host plant, which provides those nutrients via photosynthesis, while the fungus helps the plant host obtain nutrients like nitrogen and phosphorus from the soil. Beyond helping plant hosts obtain nutrients, EcM fungi are thought to have additional impacts on vegetative ecosystems, such as increasing plant host tolerance to heavy metals and, in some cases, tolerance to other types of stress. Importantly, some EcM relationships can become parasitic and a fungus can have negative effects on a plant host depending on which species are interacting and what the environmental conditions are. As mentioned, Coltricia is a globally distributed genus with an ancient lineage, and we now know it to be ectomycorrhizal. Given the importance of EcM relationships to vegetative ecosystems, it is possible that Coltricia, and C. cinnamomea specifically, have unarticulated ecological importance.

== Uses ==
Coltricia cinnamomea has not been shown to be widely culturally or economically significant, though the Coltricia genus is widely, locally recognized where it grows prolifically. It is not considered to be an edible mushroom due to its toughness. A common misconception about this mushroom is that it may have antitumor/cancer inhibiting properties. This is false, and actually refers to a study on another mushroom, Antrodia cinnamomea, which, coincidentally, has a similar appearance to C. cinnamomea.
