= Dentipratulum =

Scientific classification
- Kingdom: Fungi
- Division: Basidiomycota
- Class: Agaricomycetes
- Order: Russulales
- Family: Auriscalpiaceae
- Genus: Dentipratulum; Domański

Type species
- Dentipratulum bialoviesense Domański

Genus of fungi

Dentipratulum is a genus of fungus in the family Auriscalpiaceae. This is a monotypic genus, containing the single species Dentipratulum bialoviesense.
