= Telleria =

Telleria or Tellería may refer to:

- Agustín Tellería Mendizábal (1884–1939), Spanish Basque politician and entrepreneur.
- Branko de Tellería (born 1991), Argentine football goalkeeper
- Edward Telleria (born 1974), Dominican Republic visual artist
- Ignacio Chaves Tellería (c. 1836–1925), Nicaraguan politician and former President of Nicaragua
- Jostin Tellería (born 2003), Costa Rican professional footballer
- Maider Tellería (born 1973), Spanish field hockey player
- Martín de Telleria (17th century), Basque nobleman
- Máximo Jerez (1818–1881), born as Máximo Jerez Tellería, 19th-century Nicaraguan politician, lawyer and military leader
