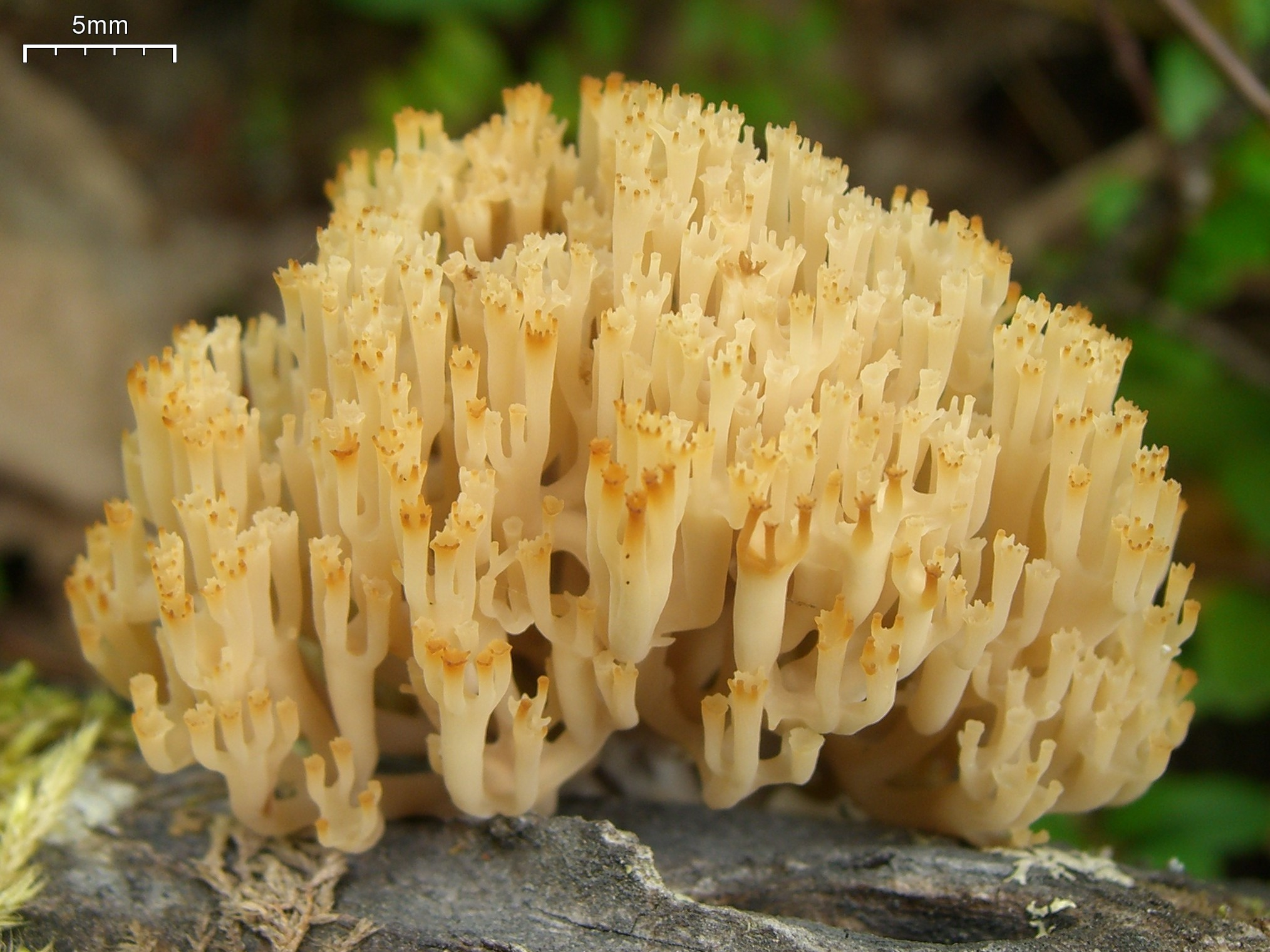
- Artomyces pyxidatus

Scientific classification
- Kingdom: Fungi
- Division: Basidiomycota
- Class: Agaricomycetes
- Order: Russulales
- Family: Auriscalpiaceae
- Genus: Artomyces; Jülich (1982)

Type species
- Artomyces pyxidatus (Pers.) Jülich (1982)

= Artomyces =

Genus of fungi

Artomyces is a genus of coral fungi in the family Auriscalpiaceae. It was circumscribed by Walter Jülich in 1982, who set Artomyces pyxidatus (formerly Clavaria pyxidata Pers. 1794) as the type species.

== Species ==
- Artomyces adrienneae Lickey 2003 – Chile, Argentina
- Artomyces austropiperatus Lickey 2003 – Argentina
- Artomyces candelabrus (Massee) Jülich 1982
- Artomyces carolinensis Lickey 2003 – North Carolina
- Artomyces colensoi (Berk.) Jülich 1982 – Australia, New Zealand
- Artomyces costaricensis Lickey 2003 – Costa Rica
- Artomyces cristatus (Kauffman) Jülich 1982
- Artomyces dichotomus (Corner) Jülich 1982
- Artomyces microsporus (Qiu X.Wu & R.H.Petersen) Lickey 2003
- Artomyces nothofagi M.E.Sm. & Kneal 2015– Chile
- Artomyces novae-zelandiae Lickey 2003 – New Zealand
- Artomyces piperatus (Kauffman) Jülich 1982
- Artomyces pyxidatus (Pers.) Jülich 1982
- Artomyces stephenii Lickey 2003 – Costa Rica
- Artomyces tasmaniensis Lickey 2003 – Tasmania
- Artomyces turgidus (Lév.) Jülich 1982
