= Persoon =

Persoon is a surname. Notable people with the surname include:

- Christiaan Hendrik Persoon (1761–1836), German mycologist
- Delfine Persoon (born 1985), Belgian boxer
- Sigrid Persoon (born 1983), Belgian former gymnast

== See also ==
- Koen Persoons (born 1983), Belgian former professional footballer
