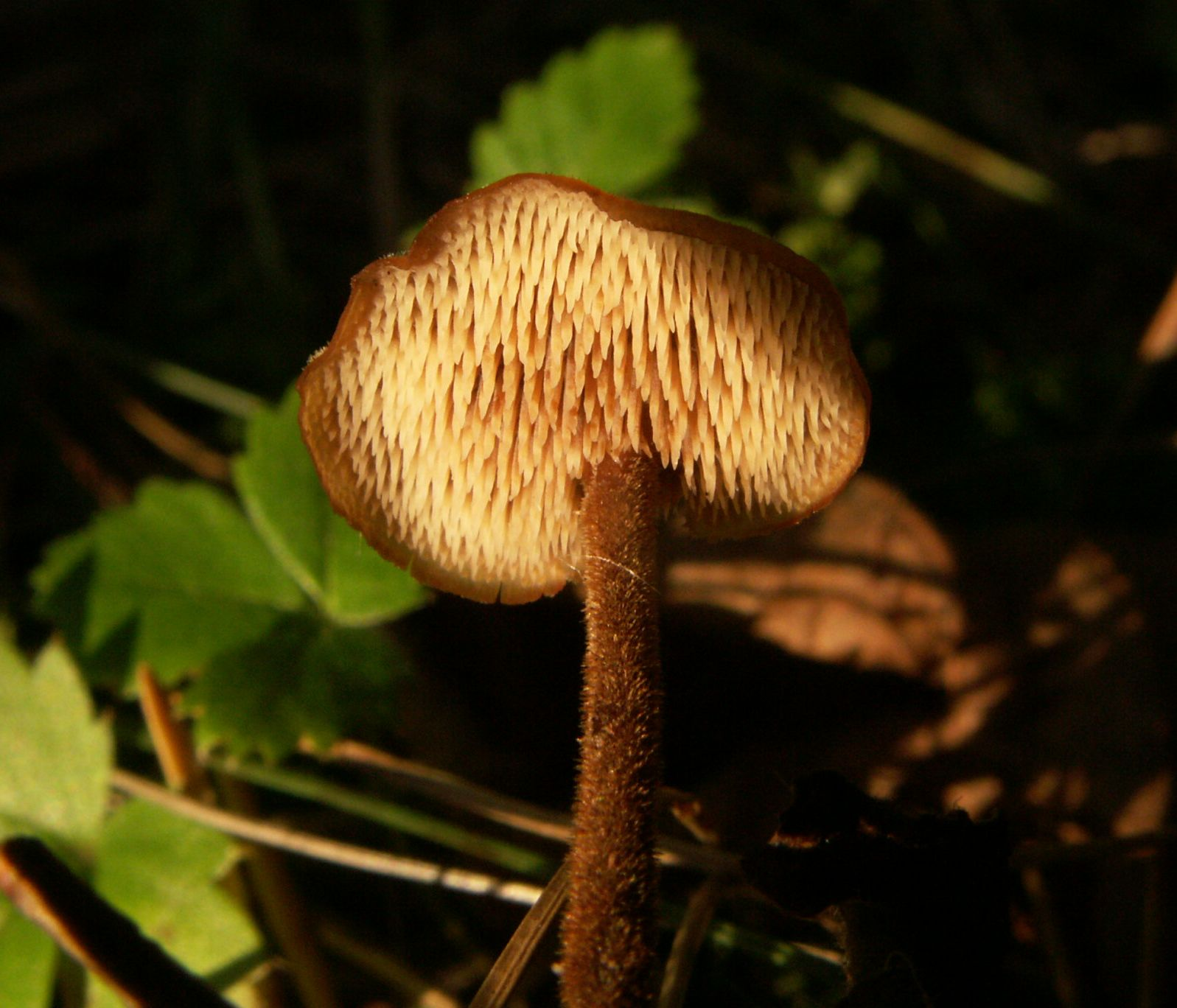
- Auriscalpium vulgare

Scientific classification
- Kingdom: Fungi
- Division: Basidiomycota
- Class: Agaricomycetes
- Order: Russulales
- Family: Auriscalpiaceae; Maas Geest. (1963)

Type genus
- Auriscalpium Gray (1821)

Genera
- Amylonotus; Artomyces; Auriscalpium; Dentipratulum; Lentinellus; Stalpersia

= Auriscalpiaceae =

Family of fungi

The Auriscalpiaceae are a family of fungi in the order Russulales. Like much of the Russulales, it has been defined through molecular phylogeny, and includes physically dissimilar species, such as the tooth fungus Auriscalpium and the gilled, often shelf-like members of Lentinellus.

== See also ==
- List of Basidiomycota families
