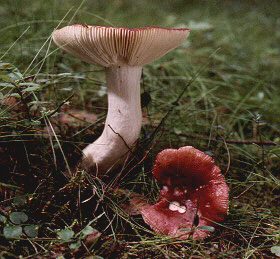
- Russula emetica

Scientific classification
- Kingdom: Fungi
- Division: Basidiomycota
- Class: Agaricomycetes
- Subclass: incertae sedis
- Order: Russulales; Kreisel ex P.M.Kirk, P.F.Cannon & J.C.David (2001)

Families
- Albatrellaceae; Amylostereaceae; Auriscalpiaceae; Bondarzewiaceae; Echinodontiaceae; Hericiaceae; Hybogasteraceae; Lachnocladiaceae; Peniophoraceae; Russulaceae; Gloeocystidiellaceae; Stereaceae

Synonyms
- Aleurodiscales Jülich (1981); Bondarzewiales Jülich (1981); Hericiales Jülich (1981); Lachnocladiales Jülich (1981); Peniophorales Boidin, Mugnier & Canales (1998); Russulales Kreisel (1969) nom. inval.; Stereales Jülich (1981)

= Russulales =

Order of fungi

The Russulales are an order of the Agaricomycetes, (which include the agaric genera Russula and Lactarius and their polyporoid and corticioid relatives). Based on 2025 data, the order includes 12 families, 102 genera and approximately 3,400 species.

Russuloid agarics represent an independent evolutionary line of agarics, not directly related to the Agaricales.

This group also includes a number of russuloid hypogeous fungi, polypores such as Bondarzewia, some tooth fungi (e.g. Auriscalpium vulgare), and club fungi e.g. Artomyces. Basidiospores in this group are typically ornamented with amyloid warts or reticulation but a few exceptions are known, e.g. Heterobasidion annosum. The genus Clavicorona was often treated in the Russulales, but its type species, C. taxophila, is in the Agaricales. The remaining species are retained in the Russulales in the genus Artomyces.

== Genera Incertae sedis ==
There are several genera classified in the Russulales that are i) poorly known, ii) have not been subjected to DNA analysis, or iii) if analysed phylogenetically do not group with as yet named or identified families, and have not been assigned to a specific family (i.e., Incertae sedis with respect to familial placement). These include:

- Aleurocystidiellum
- Dentipellopsis
- Gloeoasterostroma
- Gloeohypochnicium
- Gloeopeniophorella
- Haloaleurodiscus
- Neoalbatrellus
- Polypus
- Scopulodontia
- Scytinostromella
- Xeroceps
