= Poodří Protected Landscape Area =

Protected area in Czech Republic

Poodří
- IUCN category V (protected landscape/seascape)
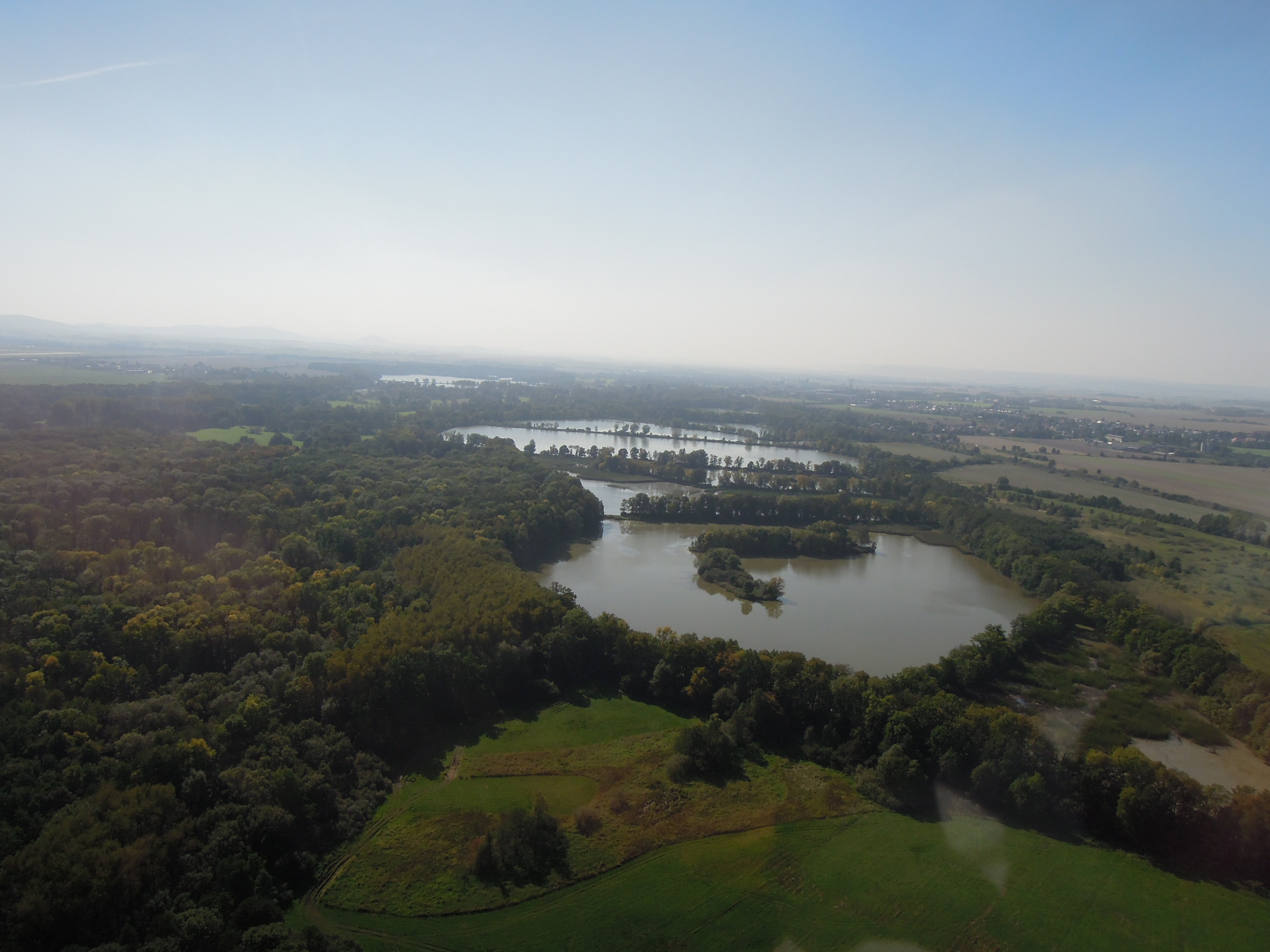
- Aerial view of the Poodří PLA

- Location within Czech Republic
- Location: Moravian-Silesian Region, Czech Republic
- Coordinates: 49°43′N 18°05′E
- Area: 81.5 km^{2} (31.5 sq mi)
- Established: 1 May 1991
- Website: poodri.nature.cz

Poodří Protected Landscape Area (Czech: Chráněná krajinná oblast Poodří) is a protected landscape area in the Moravian-Silesian Region of the Czech Republic. It was declared on 1 May 1991.

== Geography ==
The protected landscape area aims to preserve the harmoniously shaped landscape of the floodplain of the Oder River and its tributaries, with natural processes of the riverine ecosystem, characterized by a mosaic of meadow alluvial vegetation, floodplain forest stands, a significant presence of non-forest tree species, old river arms, permanent and periodic ponds, springs on river terrace slopes, and ponds with a diverse flora and fauna. It serves as an important stopover for migratory waterbirds and has natural landscape values based on the preserved dynamics of natural river processes of meandering streams and surface flooding regimes. The protection also includes wetland communities and associated rare and specially protected plant and animal species, the distribution and urban structure of municipalities, including preserved historical settlement sites, and the protection objects of the European Important Bird and Biodiversity Areas of Poodří and Cihelna Kunín.

The Poodří PLA is located in the Nový Jičín and Ostrava-City districts of the Moravian-Silesian Region. The PLA stretches between Jeseník nad Odrou and Ostrava. It marginally extends into the municipal territories of the city of Ostrava and the town of Studénka.

The Poodří PLA stretches along the course of the Oder River and includes the central part of the northeastern half of the Moravian Gate. Due to its location in the valley, there are no significant differences in elevation. The lowest point of the Poodří PLA is the river bed of the Odra in the northernmost part of the PLA at 212 m (696 ft) above sea level, and the highest point is in the southernmost part of the PLA at 299 m (981 ft) above sea level.

=== Climate ===
The Poodří PLA is located in a moderately warm area. The average annual temperature ranges from approximately 7 to 8.5 °C. The average annual precipitation is around 700 mm, and the average snowfall is about 1 meter.

== Nature ==
=== Flora ===
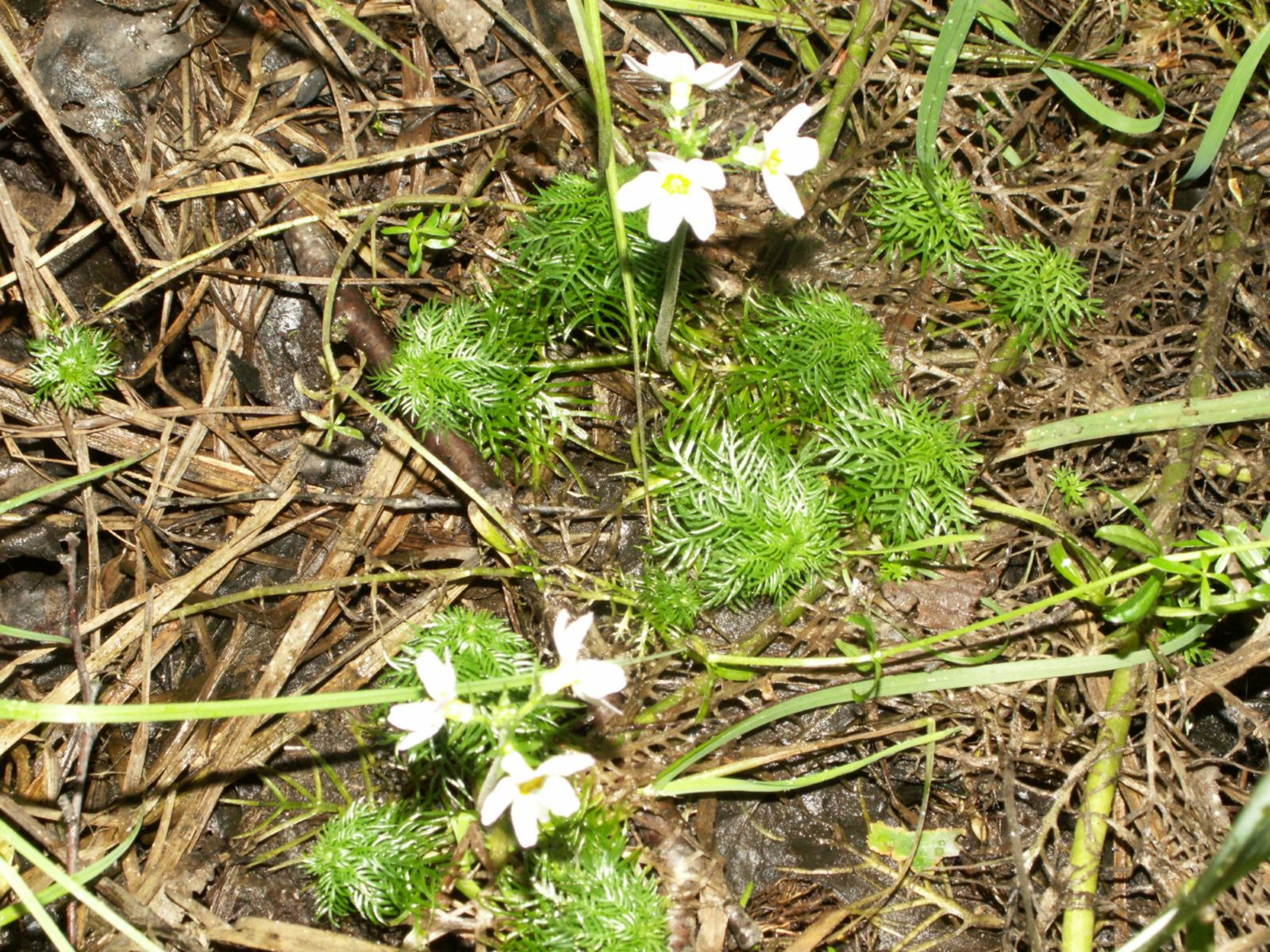
Swamp beggar

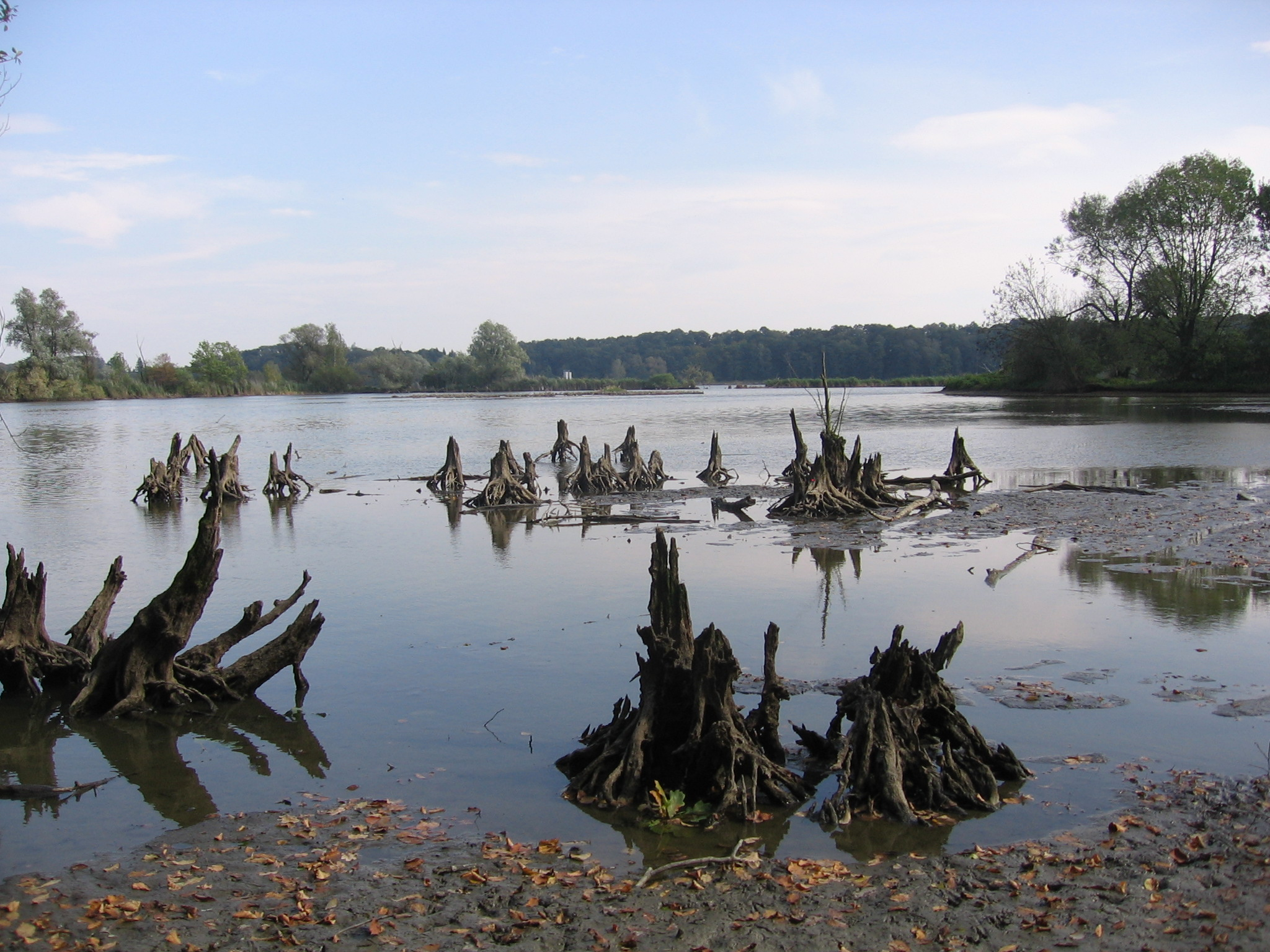
Kotvice Pond

The Poodří PLA is home to a variety of aquatic, meadow, and forest vegetation. The areas around ponds are covered with sedge and reed stands. Within the ponds, rare aquatic plants such as water caltrop, floating fern, and water-carnivorous plants like bladderwort can be found. Endangered species like the water violet and floating fern the yellow water-lily bloom near the blind river branches. The Poodří PLA is also characterized by periodically flooded floodplain meadows with distinct plant communities. Forests cover about 10% of the Poodří PLA area and consist mainly of trees such as common hornbeam, pedunculate oak, small-leaved lime, and ash. In the herbaceous layer of the forests, flowers such as snowdrop, wood anemone, early purple orchid, and bear garlic can be found.

=== Funga ===
The Poodří region is known for the presence of numerous rare and often thermophilic species of mushrooms. Some of the wood-decaying species include the hen of the woods (Grifola frondosa), umbellate polypore (Polyporus umbellatus), cauliflower fungus (Sparassis nemecii), Hartig's fire fungus (Phellinus hartigii), oak bracket (Inonotus dryadeus), dryad's saddle (Inonotus dryophilus), resinous polypore (Ganoderma resinaceum), glossy polypore (Ganoderma lucidum), ash tree bracket (Perenniporia fraxinea), coral tooth fungus (Hericium coralloides), lion's mane mushroom (Hericium erinaceus), bearded tooth fungus (Hericium flagellum), and orange-toothed crust (Sarcodontia crocea).

=== Fauna ===
The ponds, the Oder River, and the pools in the Poodří area are home to many species of aquatic mollusks, including the endangered thick shelled river mussel and the thin-lined river snail. Poodří also hosts two endangered species of crustaceans – the noble crayfish and the snowflake water louse. The insect fauna is rich, with many local species, such as the marsh fritillary butterfly, black hairstreak, stag beetle, brown chafer, and bush-cricket Stetophyma grossum. Endangered fish species in the Oder River include the spined loach, bitterling, and brook lamprey, while the striped rudd can be found in the pools. The Poodří PLA is home to many amphibian species, with the great crested newt, fire-bellied toad, and European tree frog being among the most significant in terms of nature conservation. With its ponds and wetlands, the area is a popular refuge for water birds, including nesting species such as the grey heron, great cormorant, red-necked grebe, red-crested pochard, coot, greylag goose, great bittern, and bittern. Many other rare bird species can be observed in the area, although they do not nest there but spend part of the year there. Protected mammal species found in the Poodří PLA include the European beaver and Eurasian otter. The PLA territory is home to 16 bat species, which represents 76% of the bat fauna in the Czech Republic. Poodří is also habitat for Osmoderma eremita (newly Osmoderma barnabita), which one of the LIFE's projects led by Arnika and University of Ostrava aimed to protect and enlarge.

== Administration and legal framework ==
The Poodří PLA administration is located in Studénka. The protected landscape area was declared on 1 May 1991. A new declaration was made by Government Regulation No. 51/2017 Coll. on the Poodří Protected Landscape Area, which simultaneously revoked the original declaration regulation, on 15 February 2017.

Within the Poodří PLA, there are ten small-scale protected areas, managed by the administration of the PLA:

- Polanská niva National Nature Reserve
- Bartošovický luh Nature Reserve
- Bařiny Nature Reserve
- Bažantula Nature Reserve
- Koryta Nature Reserve
- Kotvice Nature Reserve
- Polanský les Nature Reserve
- Rákosina Nature Reserve
- Rezavka Nature Reserve
- Jistebnické mokřady Nature Reserve, established in 2026
- Meandry Staré Odry Nature Monument

The Pusté nivy Nature Monument was abolished in 2014. In addition, the administration of the PLA manages several small-scale protected areas outside the PLA.
