= Inonotus acutus =

Scientific classification
- Domain: Eukaryota
- Kingdom: Fungi
- Division: Basidiomycota
- Class: Agaricomycetes
- Order: Hymenochaetales
- Family: Hymenochaetaceae
- Genus: Inonotus
- Species: I. acutus

Binomial name
- Inonotus acutus Cui & Dai, 2011

Species of fungus

Inonotus acutus is a species of fungus in the family Hymenochaetaceae. It is characterized by having small and thin basidiocarps, a sharp pileus margin, ventricose hymenial setae, and ellipsoid, yellowish and thick-walled basidiospores.
