= Inonotus rigidus =

Scientific classification
- Domain: Eukaryota
- Kingdom: Fungi
- Division: Basidiomycota
- Class: Agaricomycetes
- Order: Hymenochaetales
- Family: Hymenochaetaceae
- Genus: Inonotus
- Species: I. rigidus

Binomial name
- Inonotus rigidus Cui & Dai, 2011

Species of fungus

Inonotus rigidus is a species of fungus in the family Hymenochaetaceae. It is distinguished by its resupinate and rigid basidiocarps, its yellow pore surface, being microscopically ellipsoid and yellowish brown, its thick-walled basidiospores, and by lacking both setal hyphae and hymenial setae.
