= Jeseník nad Odrou =

- Municipality
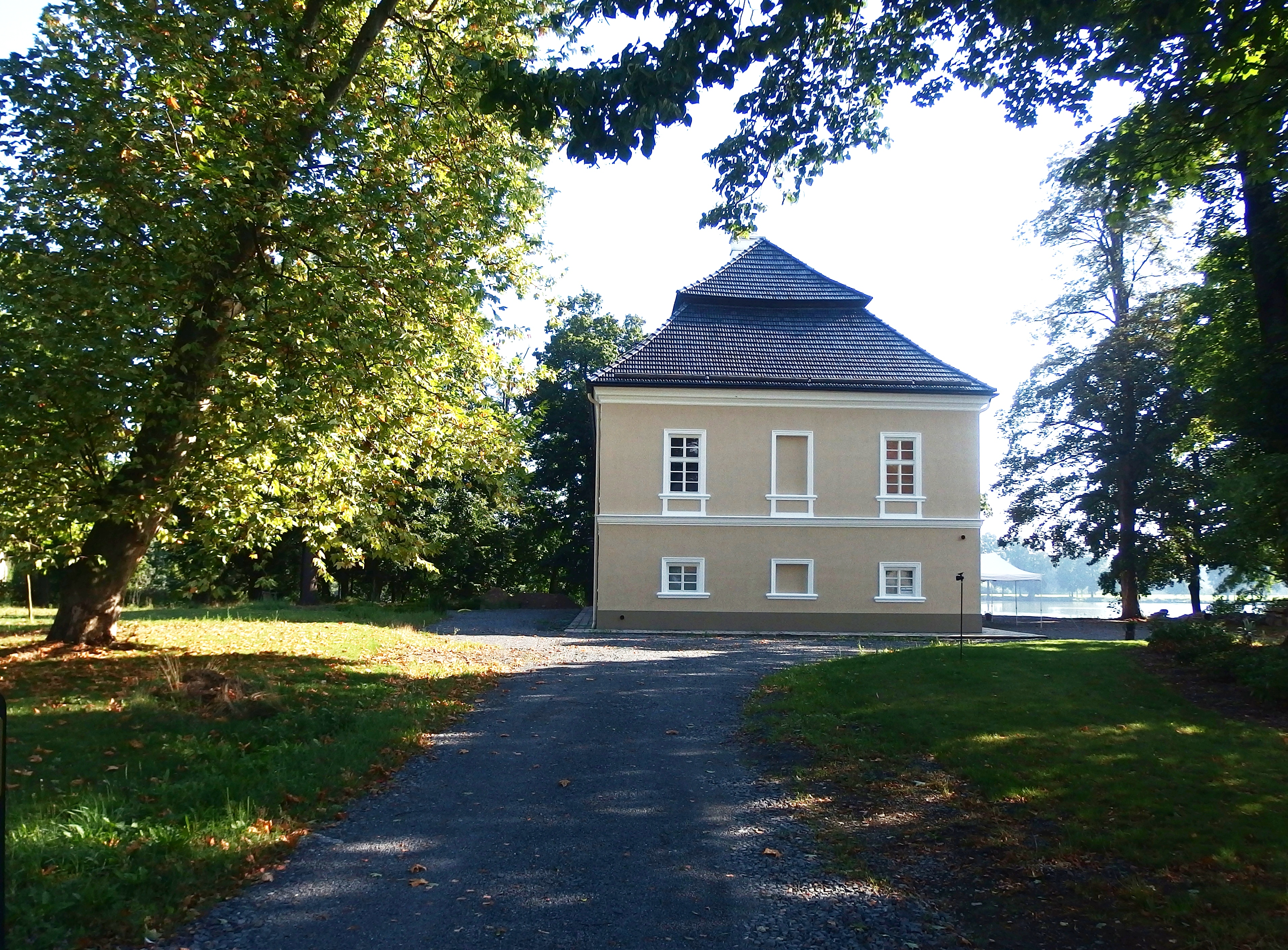
- Jeseník nad Odrou Castle

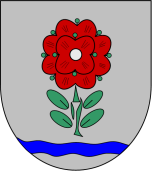
- Flag Coat of arms

- Location in the Czech Republic
- Coordinates: 49°36′43″N 17°54′19″E
- Country: Czech Republic
- Region: Moravian-Silesian
- District: Nový Jičín
- First mentioned: 1383

Area
  - Total: 28.93 km^{2} (11.17 sq mi)
- Elevation: 264 m (866 ft)

Population (2026-01-01)
  - Total: 1,919
  - Density: 66.33/km^{2} (171.8/sq mi)
- Time zone: UTC+1 (CET)
  - Summer (DST): UTC+2 (CEST)
- Postal codes: 741 01, 742 33
- Website: www.jeseniknadodrou.cz

Jeseník nad Odrou (until 1946 Německý Jeseník; German: Deutsch Jassnik) is a municipality and village in Nový Jičín District in the Moravian-Silesian Region of the Czech Republic. It has about 1,900 inhabitants.

== Administrative division ==
Jeseník nad Odrou consists of five municipal parts (in brackets population according to the 2021 census):

- Jeseník nad Odrou (996)
- Blahutovice (177)
- Hrabětice (55)
- Hůrka (317)
- Polouvsí (247)

== Geography ==
Jeseník nad Odrou is located about 7 kilometres (4 mi) west of Nový Jičín and 33 km (21 mi) southwest of Ostrava. Most of the municipal territory lies in the Moravian Gate, only the southeastern part with the village of Hůrka lies in the Moravian-Silesian Foothills. The highest point is the hill Hůrka at 380 m (1,247 ft) above sea level. The municipality is situated on the right bank of the Oder River. The Luha Stream flows through the municipality and then joins the Oder. There are several fishponds in the municipality. The northern part of the municipality lies within the Poodří Protected Landscape Area.

== History ==
The first written mention of the villages of Jeseník nad Odrou and Hůrka comes from 1383. The first mention of Polouvsí is from 1412 and of Blahutovice from 1499. Hrabětice was founded between 1772 and 1776.

During March 1938, four of the five villages that now form the municipality were occupied and annexed by Nazi Germany. The rest of Czech lands were occupied the year after, forming the Protectorate of Bohemia and Moravia in 1939. This protectorate included also the last part of the municipality, the Hůrka village. Jewish population of the municipality fled or was killed during the Holocaust, while the German-speaking population was expelled after World War II.

Jeseník nad Odrou and Hrabětice were merged into one municipality in 1957. Polouvsí was joined in 1975 and Blahutovice with Hůrka in 1976.

On the night of 24–25 June 2009, the village was hit by a sudden flood caused by a consecutive series of violent cloudbursts. Three people were killed and it caused extensive damage. Jeseník nad Odrou was the area in the Czech Republic most affected by these floods.

== Demographics ==
Historical population

Year	Pop.	±%
1869	2,341	—
1880	2,342	+0.0%
1890	2,271	−3.0%
1900	2,313	+1.8%
1910	2,404	+3.9%

Year	Pop.	±%
1921	2,249	−6.4%
1930	2,296	+2.1%
1950	2,044	−11.0%
1961	2,239	+9.5%
1970	2,000	−10.7%

Year	Pop.	±%
1980	1,923	−3.8%
1991	1,825	−5.1%
2001	1,862	+2.0%
2011	1,785	−4.1%
2021	1,792	+0.4%

Source: Censuses

== Transport ==
Jeseník nad Odrou is located on the railway line Ostrava–Hranice.

== Sights ==
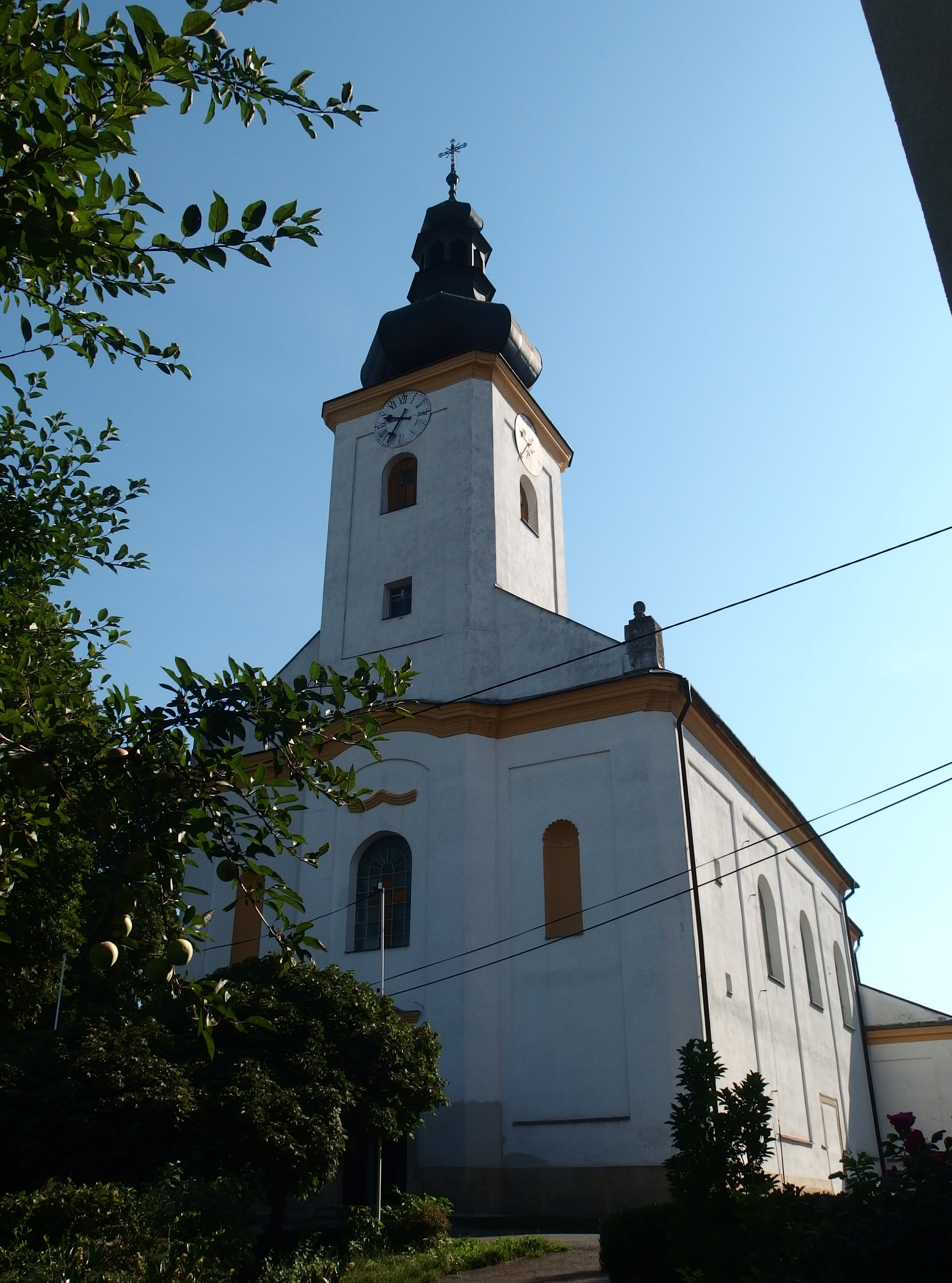
Church of the Assumption of the Virgin Mary

The late Baroque castle dates from 1728. Today it is privately owned and inaccessible. The castle is surrounded by a small English-style park.

The Church of the Assumption of the Virgin Mary was built in 1752. This parish church replaced an old wooden church, destroyed by the fire in 1710.

There are six springs in the area that provide drinkable mineral water with high iron content. They were discovered in the mid-19th century. Two of the springs are freely accessible.
