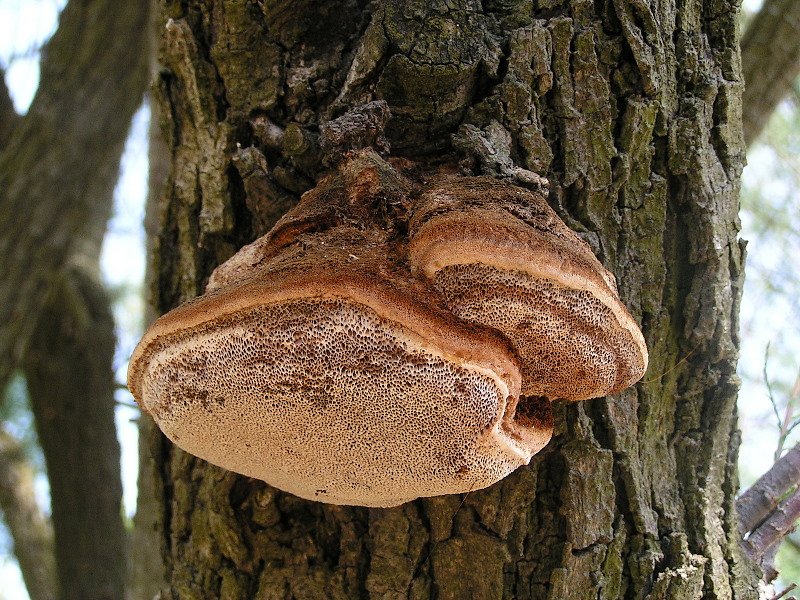

Scientific classification
- Domain: Eukaryota
- Kingdom: Fungi
- Division: Basidiomycota
- Class: Agaricomycetes
- Order: Hymenochaetales
- Family: Hymenochaetaceae
- Genus: Inonotus
- Species: I. tamaricis

Binomial name
- Inonotus tamaricis (Pat.) Maire (1938)

Synonyms
- Xanthochrous tamaricis Pat. (1904); Polyporus tamaricis (Pat.) Sacc. & D.Sacc. (1905); Xanthochrous rheades subsp. tamaricis (Pat.) Bourdot & Galzin (1925); Inocutis tamaricis (Pat.) Fiasson & Niemelä (1984)

= Inonotus tamaricis =

Species of fungus

Inonotus tamaricis is a species of fungus in the family Hymenochaetaceae. A plant pathogen, it grows on dead and living Tamarix species, and is found in Southern Europe, North Africa, Syria and Senegal, Southern Asia and east to China.
