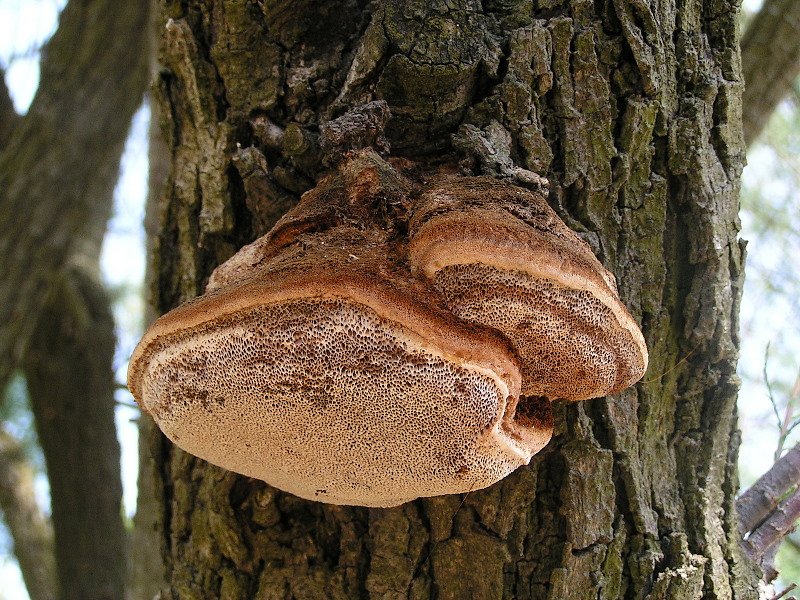
- Inonotus tamaricis

Scientific classification
- Kingdom: Fungi
- Division: Basidiomycota
- Class: Agaricomycetes
- Order: Hymenochaetales
- Family: Hymenochaetaceae
- Genus: Inonotus; P.Karst. (1879)

Type species
- Inonotus cuticularis (Bull.) P.Karst. (1879)

Synonyms
- Cyclomyces Kunze ex Fr. (1830); Inoderma P.Karst. (1879); Inodermus Quél. (1886); Phaeoporus J.Schröt. (1888); Flaviporellus Murrill (1905); Cycloporellus Murrill (1907); Xanthoporia Murrill (1916); Polystictoides Lázaro Ibiza (1917); Inonotopsis Parmasto (1973)

= Inonotus =

Genus of fungi

Inonotus is a genus of fungi in the family Hymenochaetaceae. The genus, described by Petter Karsten in 1879, is estimated to contain about 112 species as of November 2026.

The name comes from ino meaning fibrous and ot meaning ear.

Fungi of this genus have been recorded as main food of the pleasing fungus beetles Triplax festiva and T.frontalis, and presumably also their closest relatives T.alachuae, T.macra and T.marcescens.

== Species ==
- Inonotus acutus
- Inonotus adnatus
- Inonotus afromontanus
- Inonotus albertinii
- Inonotus amazonicus
- Inonotus andersonii
- Inonotus arizonicus
- Inonotus australiensis
- Inonotus austropusillus
- Inonotus boninensis
- Inonotus chihshanyenus
- Inonotus chilanshanus
- Inonotus chrysomarginatus
- Inonotus clemensiae
- Inonotus costaricensis
- Inonotus crocitinctus
- Inonotus cuticularis
- Inonotus dentatus
- Inonotus dentiporus
- Inonotus diverticuloseta
- Inonotus dryadeus
- Inonotus dryophilus
- Inonotus duostratosus
- Inonotus euphoriae
- Inonotus farlowii
- Inonotus fimbriatus
- Inonotus flammans
- Inonotus flavidus
- Inonotus fulvomelleus
- Inonotus glomeratus
- Inonotus gracilis
- Inonotus griseus – China
- Inonotus hamusetulus
- Inonotus hastifer
- Inonotus hemmesii
- Inonotus hispidus
- Inonotus japonicus
- Inonotus juniperinus
- Inonotus leporinus
- Inonotus lloydii
- Inonotus ludovicianus
- Inonotus luteoumbrinus
- Inonotus marginatus
- Inonotus micantissimus
- Inonotus microsporus
- Inonotus mikadoi
- Inonotus minutoporus
- Inonotus munzii
- Inonotus navisporus
- Inonotus neotropicus
- Inonotus nidus-pici
- Inonotus niveomarginatus
- Inonotus nodulosus
- Inonotus nothofagi
- Inonotus novoguineensis
- Inonotus obliquus
- Inonotus ochroporus
- Inonotus pacificus
- Inonotus palmicola
- Inonotus papyrinus
- Inonotus patouillardii
- Inonotus pegleri
- Inonotus peristrophidis
- Inonotus pertenuis
- Inonotus plorans
- Inonotus poncei
- Inonotus porrectus
- Inonotus pseudoglomeratus
- Inonotus pseudoradiatus
- Inonotus pusillus
- Inonotus quercustris
- Inonotus radiatus
- Inonotus rheades
- Inonotus rickii
- Inonotus rigidus
- Inonotus rodwayi
- Inonotus setulosocroceus
- Inonotus shoreae
- Inonotus sideroides
- Inonotus splitgerberi
- Inonotus tabacinus
- Inonotus tamaricis
- Inonotus tenuissimus
- Inonotus triqueter
- Inonotus ungulatus
- Inonotus venezuelicus
- Inonotus xanthoporus
- Inonotus xeranticus
