= Protected areas of the Czech Republic =

Large-scale protected areas of the Czech Republic: national parks (brown) and protected landscape areas (green)

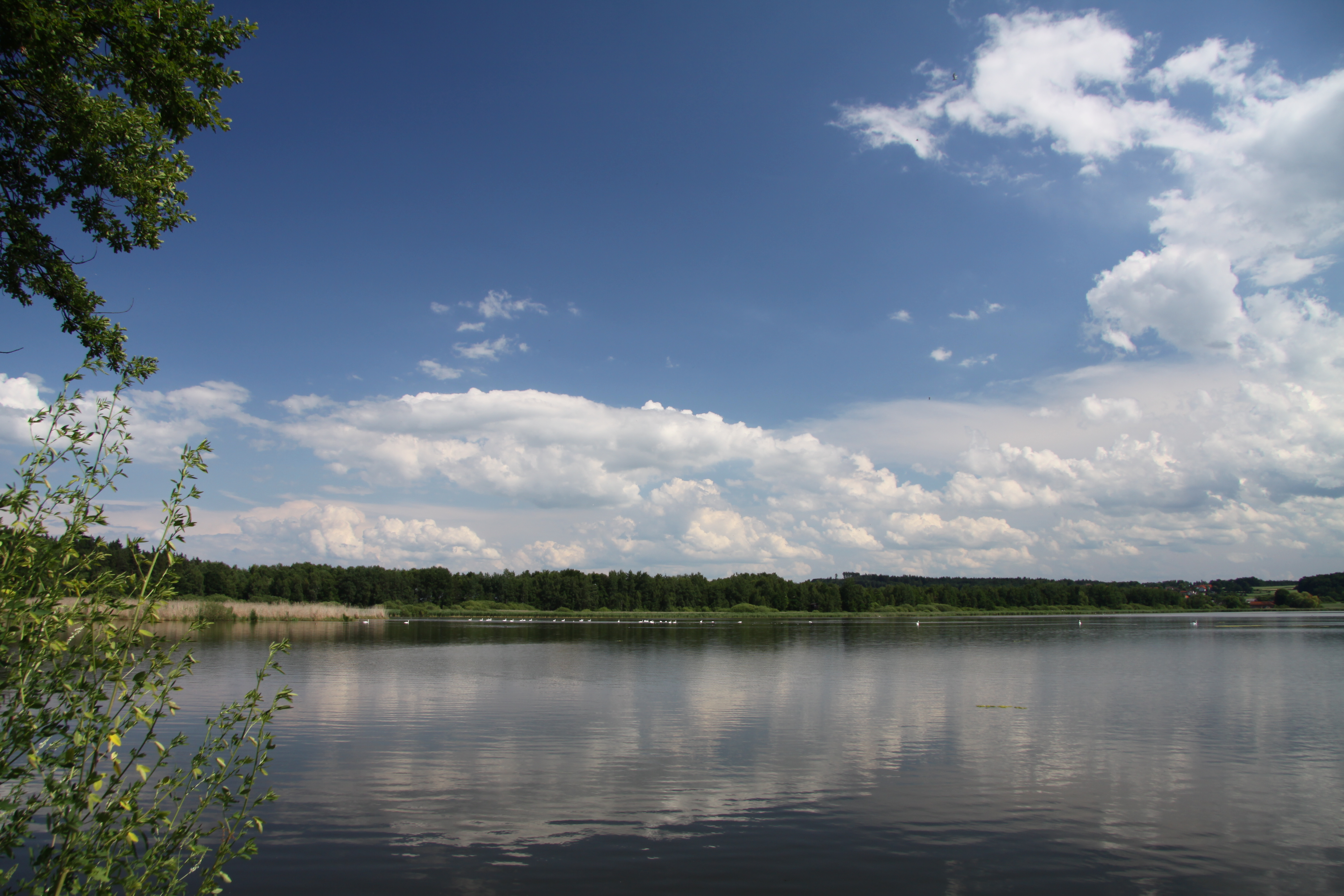
Řežabinec National Nature Monument

There are several types of protected areas of the Czech Republic. The main form of landscape protection is delimitation of special protected areas. All the types of protected areas are determined by law.

== Special protected areas ==
There are six types of special protected areas distinguished by their size and importance. The types of large-scale protected areas are national park and protected landscape area; the types of small-scale protected areas are national nature reserve, nature reserve, national nature monument, and nature monument.

=== National park ===
National park (Czech: národní park, abbreviated as NP) are defined as a large areas with a typical relief and geological structure and a predominant occurrence of natural or man-made ecosystems, unique and significant on a national or international scale in terms of ecology, science, education or awareness. They are established by the Czech Government. As of 2025, there are four national parks in the Czech Republic, with a total area of 1,190.2 square kilometres (459.5 sq mi), which is 1.50% of the Czech Republic's area.

Short name	Full name	Established	Area		Protected zone area	
Krkonoše	Krkonošský národní park (KRNAP)	1963	363.27 km^{2}	140.26 sq mi	186.42 km^{2}	71.98 sq mi
Podyjí	Národní park Podyjí	1991	63 km^{2}	24 sq mi	29 km^{2}	11 sq mi
Šumava	Národní park Šumava	1991	685.2 km^{2}	264.6 sq mi	944.8 km^{2}	364.8 sq mi ^{*}
Bohemian Switzerland	Národní park České Švýcarsko	2000	79 km^{2}	31 sq mi		
^{*} The Šumava Protective Zone constitutes the Šumava PLA

=== Protected landscape area ===
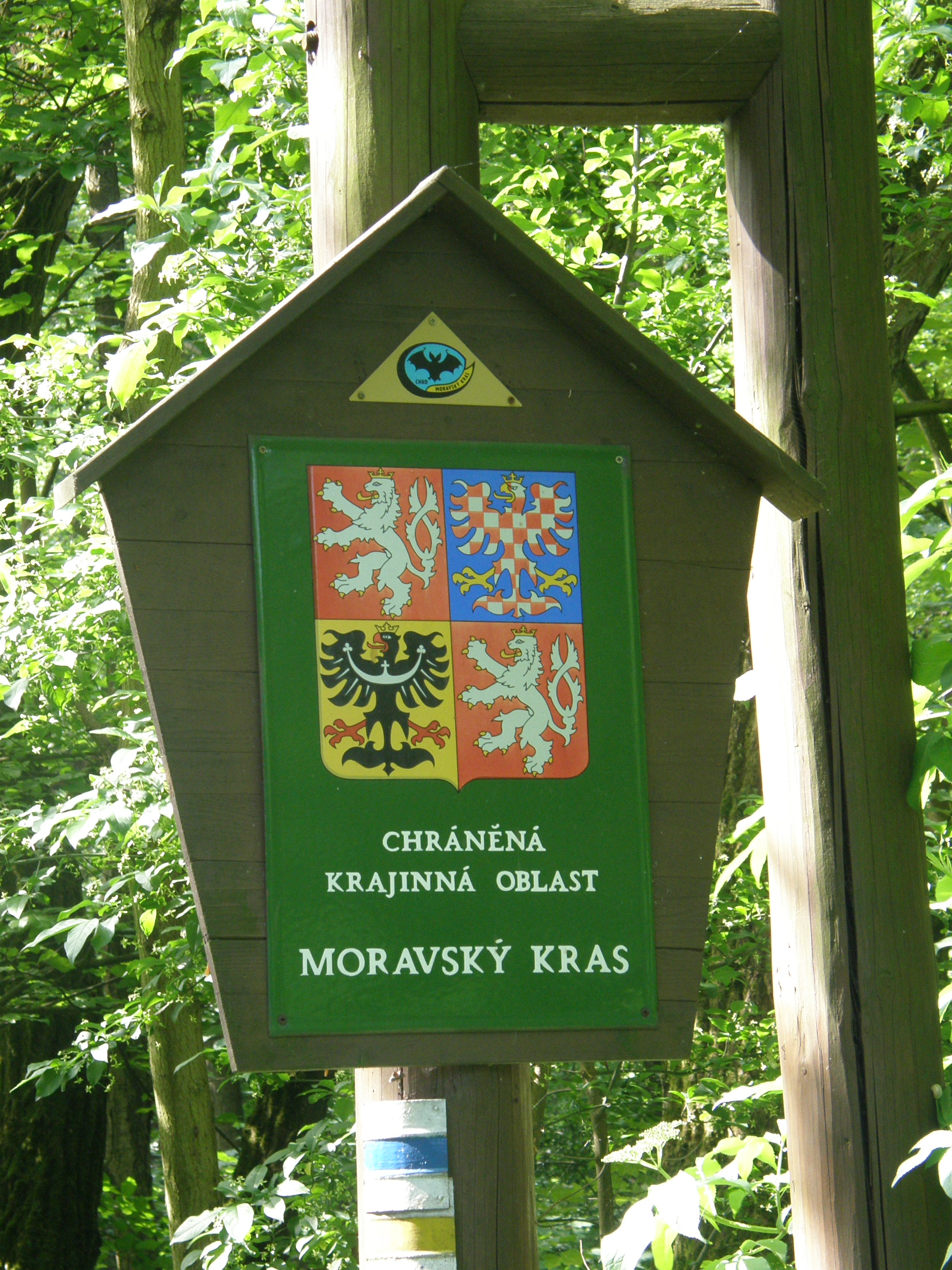
Entrance to Moravian Karst PLA

Protected landscape area (abbreviated PLA; Czech: chráněná krajinná oblast, abbreviated CHKO) is a large area of harmonic landscape with a typical relief, with a considerable share of natural forest and permanent grassy ecosystems, there can also be preserved human settlement monuments. They are established by the Czech Government. As of 2025, there are 27 protected landscape areas in the Czech Republic, with a total area of 11,507.2 square kilometres (4,443.0 sq mi), which is 14.59% of the Czech Republic's area.

Czech name	English translation	Established	Area	
Český ráj	Bohemian Paradise	1955	182 km^{2}	70.27 sq mi
Moravský kras	Moravian Karst	1956	97 km^{2}	37 sq mi
Šumava	Bohemian Forest	1963	995 km^{2}	384.2 sq mi
Jizerské hory	Jizera Mountains	1968	374 km^{2}	144 sq mi
Jeseníky	Ash Mountains	1969	744 km^{2}	287 sq mi
Orlické hory	Orlické Mountains	1969	233 km^{2}	90 sq mi
Žďárské vrchy	Žďár Hills	1970	709 km^{2}	274 sq mi
Český kras	Bohemian Karst	1972	132 km^{2}	51 sq mi
Labské pískovce	Elbe Sandstone Mountains	1972	243 km^{2}	94 sq mi
Beskydy	Beskids	1973	1,205 km^{2}	465.25 sq mi
Slavkovský les	Slavkov Forest	1974	611 km^{2}	236 sq mi
České středohoří	Central Bohemian Uplands	1976	1,069 km^{2}	413 sq mi
Kokořínsko – Máchův kraj	Kokořín Area – Mácha's Region	1976	410 km^{2}	158 sq mi
Lužické hory	Lusatian Mountains	1976	271 km^{2}	105 sq mi
Pálava	Pálava	1976	85 km^{2}	33 sq mi
Křivoklátsko	Křivoklát Area	1978	625 km^{2}	241 sq mi
Třeboňsko	Třeboň Basin	1979	687 km^{2}	265 sq mi
Bílé Karpaty	White Carpathians	1980	747 km^{2}	288.4 sq mi
Blaník	Blaník	1981	40 km^{2}	15 sq mi
Blanský les	Blanský Forest	1989	220 km^{2}	84.94 sq mi
Litovelské Pomoraví	Litovel Morava Basin	1990	93 km^{2}	36 sq mi
Broumovsko	Broumov Area	1991	432 km^{2}	167 sq mi
Poodří	Oder Basin	1991	82 km^{2}	31.7 sq mi
Železné hory	Iron Mountains	1991	285 km^{2}	110 sq mi
Český les	Upper Palatine Forest	2005	466 km^{2}	180 sq mi
Brdy	Brdy	2016	345 km^{2}	133 sq mi
Soutok	Confluence	2025	125 km^{2}	48 sq mi

=== National nature reserve ===
National nature reserve (Czech: národní přírodní rezervace, abbreviated NPR) is a smaller area of exceptional nature value, where a typical relief of typical geological composition is combined with ecosystems important on an international or national level. They are established by the Czech Ministry of Environment. As of 2025, there are 109 national nature reserves in the Czech Republic, with a total area of 308.3 square kilometres (119.0 sq mi), which is 0.39% of the Czech Republic's area.

=== Nature reserve ===
Nature reserve (Czech: přírodní rezervace, abbreviated PR) is a smaller area with concentrated nature features and ecosystems typical for a given geographical region. They are established by the appropriate Regional Government (Czech: krajský úřad) or Management of a National Park or Landscape Protected Area. As of 2025, there are 825 nature reserves in the Czech Republic, with a total area of 443.9 square kilometres (171.4 sq mi), which is 0.56% of the Czech Republic's area.

=== National nature monument ===
National nature monument (Czech: národní přírodní památka, abbreviated as NPP) is a nature formation of a smaller area, usually geological or geomorphological formation, mineral or fossil collection locality or a habitat of endangered plants or animals in parts of ecosystems with a local environmental, scientific or esthetic importance. They are established by the Czech Ministry of Environment. As of 2025, there are 126 national nature monuments in the Czech Republic, with a total area of 114.1 square kilometres (44.1 sq mi), which is 0.14% of the Czech Republic's area.

=== Nature monument ===
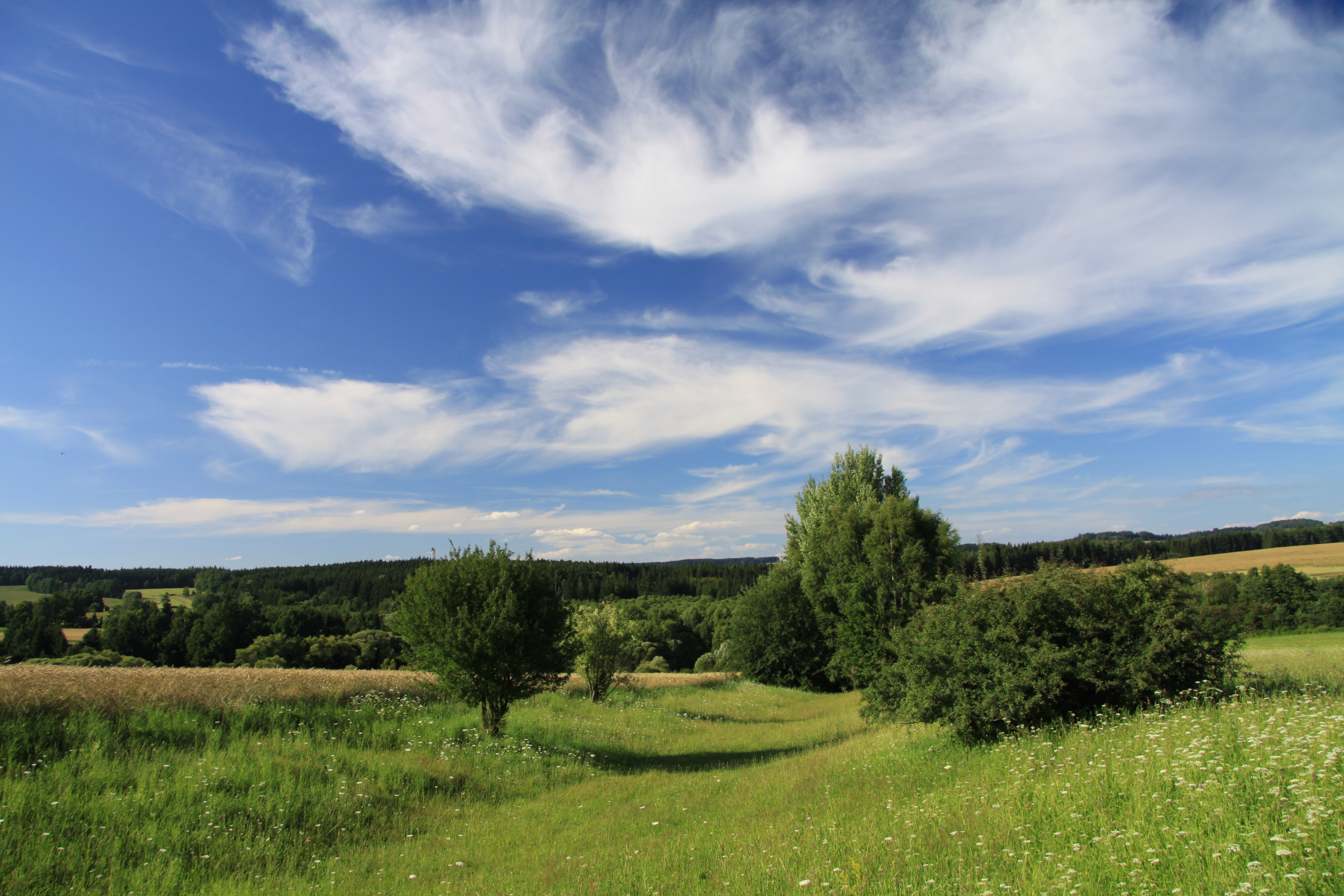
Hroby Nature Monument in Radenín

Nature monument (Czech: přírodní památka, abbreviated as PP) is a nature formation of a smaller area, usually geological or geomorphological formation, mineral or fossil collection locality or a habitat of endangered plants or animals in parts of ecosystems with an international or national environmental, scientific or esthetic importance. They are established by the appropriate Regional Government or Management of a national park or protected landscape area. As of 2025, there are 1623 nature monuments in the Czech Republic, with a total area of 352.4 square kilometres (136.1 sq mi), which is 0.44% of the Czech Republic's area.

== Other forms of landscape protection ==
=== Nature park ===
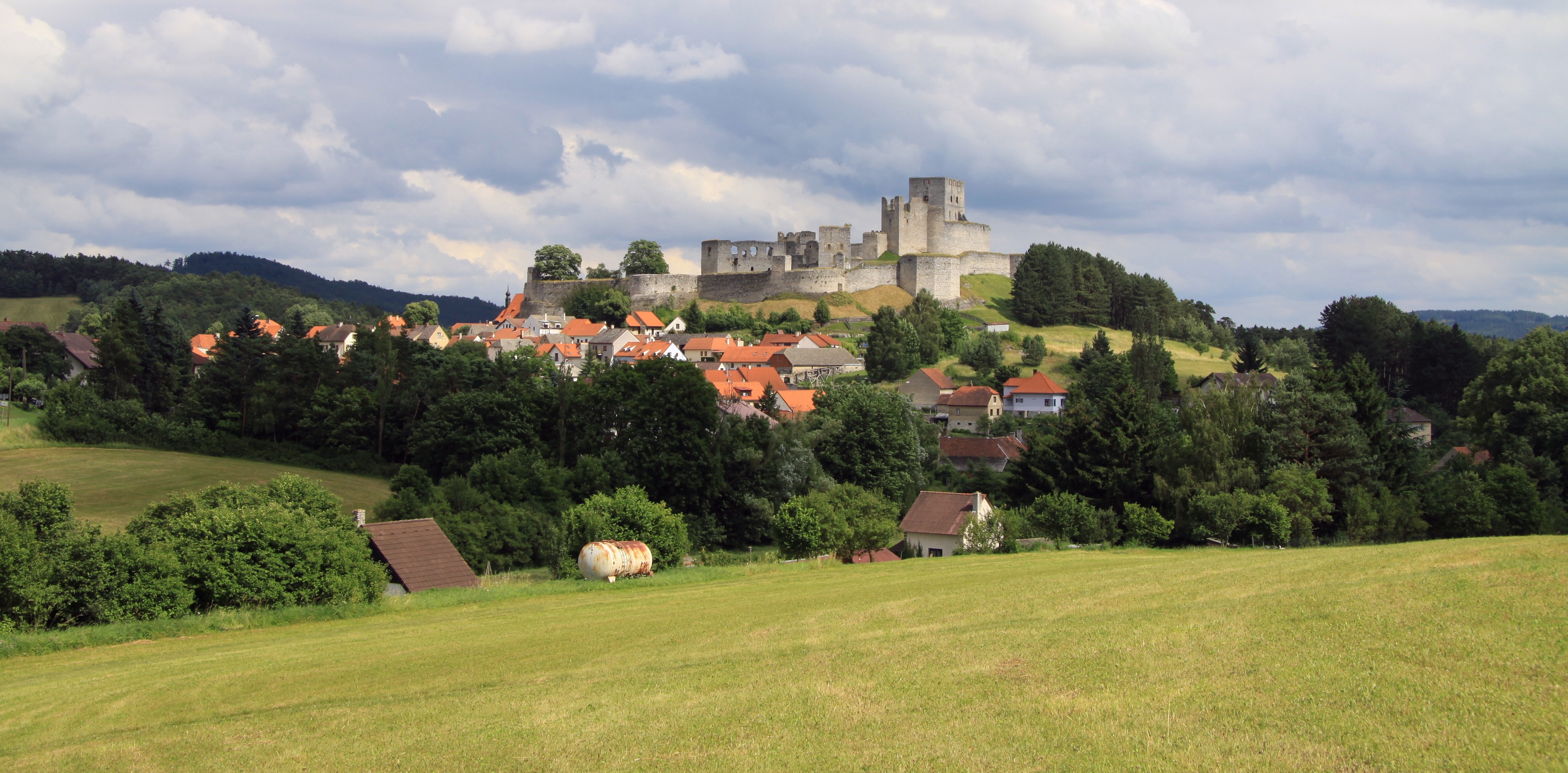
Buděticko Nature Park with Rabí Castle

Nature park (Czech: přírodní park) is usually a large area serving the protection of a landscape against activities that could decrease its natural and esthetic value. They can be established by any State Environment Protection body.

=== Memorable tree, group of trees or alley ===
Memorable tree, group of trees or alley (Czech: památný strom, skupina stromů nebo stromořadí) can be established by any State Environment Protection body.

=== Notable landscape feature ===
Notable landscape feature (Czech: významný krajinný prvek) is usually a natural, cultural or historical feature typical for a given locality or region. They can be established by any State Environment Protection body.

=== Specially protected species of plants and animals ===
Specially protected species of plants and animals (Czech: Zvláště chráněné druhy rostlin a živočichů) are those species or subspecies which are very rare, generally endangered, scientifically or culturally important. They are listed in a Ministry of the Environment of the Czech Republic regulation. As of 2025, there are 505 plant species, 27 mushroom species and 309 animal species on the list.
