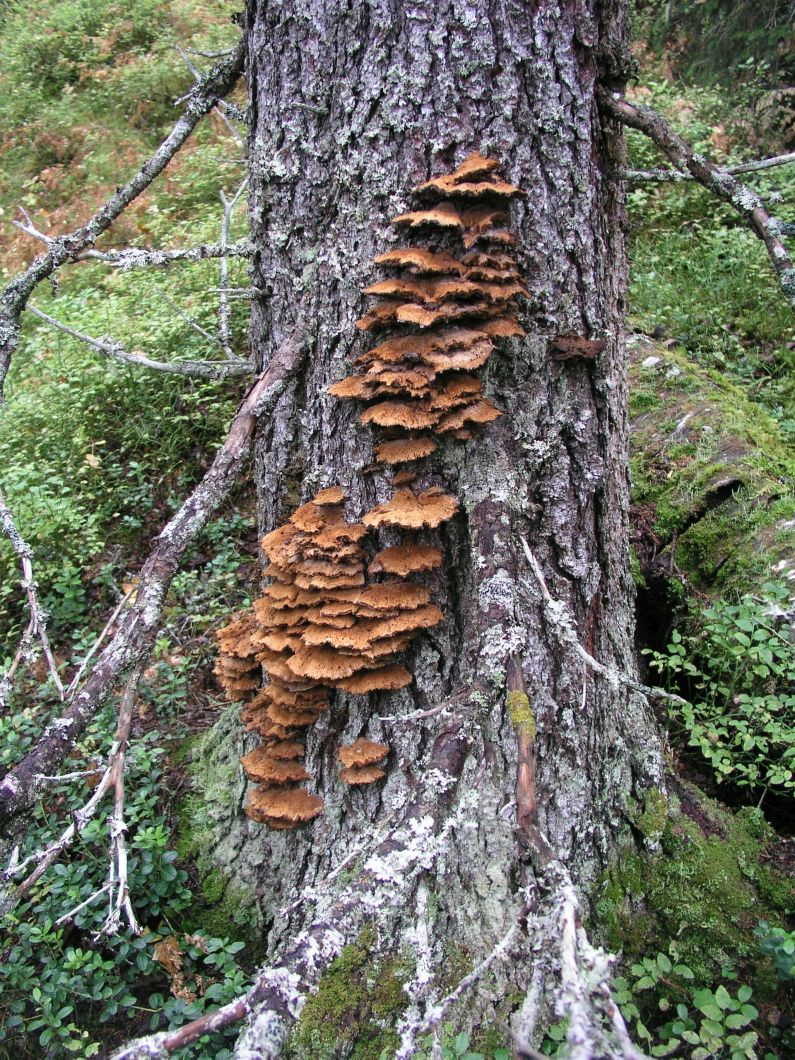

Scientific classification
- Domain: Eukaryota
- Kingdom: Fungi
- Division: Basidiomycota
- Class: Agaricomycetes
- Order: Hymenochaetales
- Family: Hymenochaetaceae
- Genus: Inonotus
- Species: I. leporinus

Binomial name
- Inonotus leporinus (Fr.) Gilb. & Ryvarden

= Inonotus leporinus =

Species of fungus

Inonotus leporinus is a species of fungus belonging to the family Hymenochaetaceae.

It is native to Eurasia and Northern America.

Synonym:

- Pelloporus leporinus
