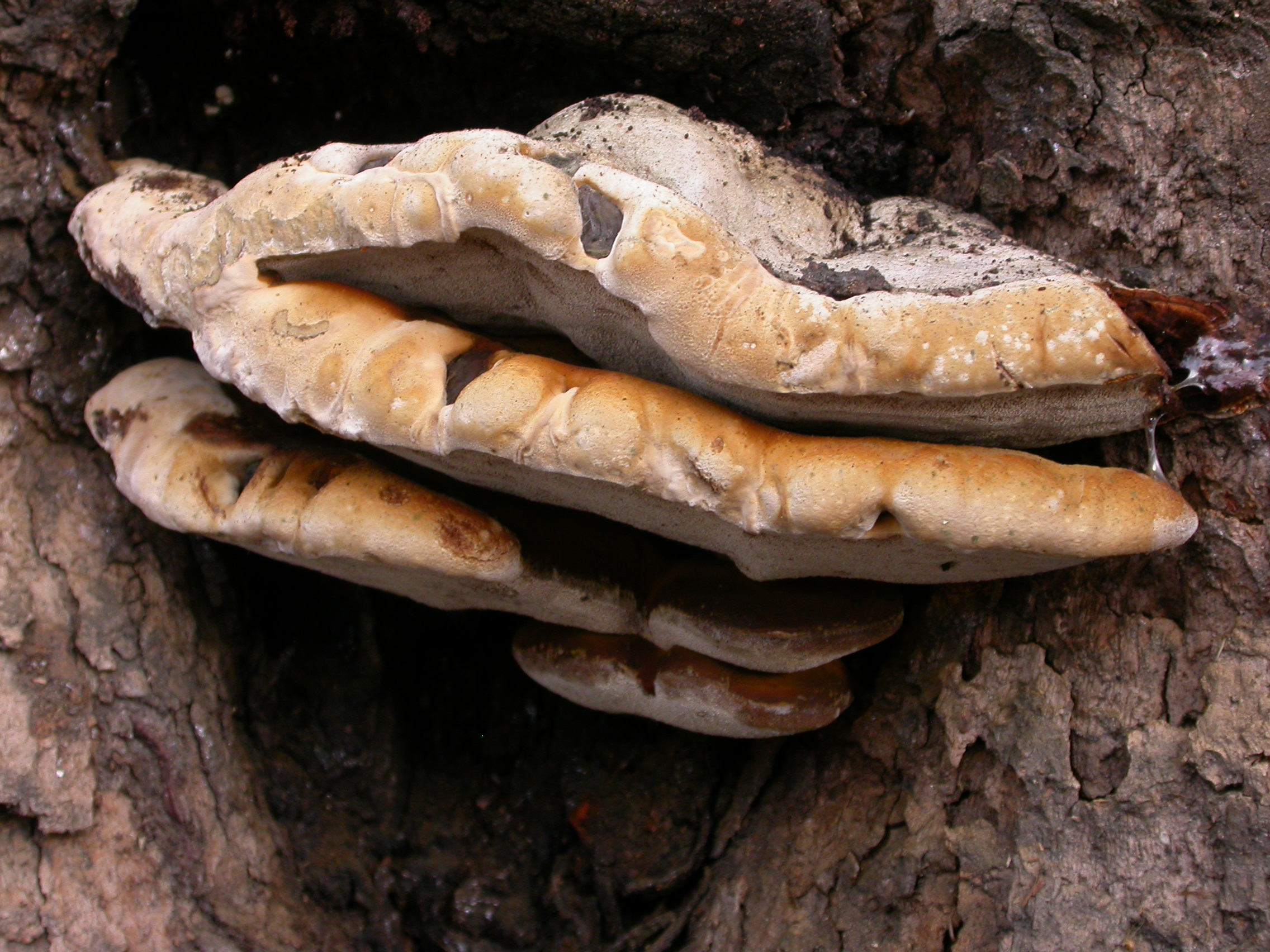

Scientific classification
- Domain: Eukaryota
- Kingdom: Fungi
- Division: Basidiomycota
- Class: Agaricomycetes
- Order: Hymenochaetales
- Family: Hymenochaetaceae
- Genus: Inonotus
- Species: I. arizonicus

Binomial name
- Inonotus arizonicus Gilb. (1969)

= Inonotus arizonicus =

Species of fungus

Inonotus arizonicus is a plant pathogen. I. arizonicus is a locally common saprotrophic polypore that induces white rot in sycamore trees in southwestern North America. Host species include Platanus wrightii (Arizona sycamores) and Platanus racemosa (California sycamores). The fruiting bodies, shaped like hooves or a plate or a stack of plates, can appear on trunks, at the base of living trees, or on stumps or snags. In California this species is generally found south of the San Francisco Bay Area.

== Sources ==
- Gilbertson, Robert L. (1969-05-16). "A New Species of Inonotus on Southwestern Sycamores". The Southwestern Naturalist. 14 (1): 123–125. doi:10.2307/3669252. JSTOR 3669252.
- Goldstein, Donna; Gilbertson, Robert L. (January 1981). "Cultural Morphology and Sexuality of Inonotus arizonicus". Mycologia. 73 (1): 167. doi:10.2307/3759633. JSTOR 3759633.
- Siegel, Noah; Schwarz, Christian (2016). Mushrooms of the Redwood Coast: A Comprehensive Guide to the Fungi of Coastal Northern California. Clarkson Potter/Ten Speed. ISBN 9781607748182. LCCN 2015027853. OCLC 956478776.
- Smith, Kevin (Fall 2013). "Decay fungi of riparian trees in the Southwestern U.S." (PDF). Western Arborist. pp. 40–51.
