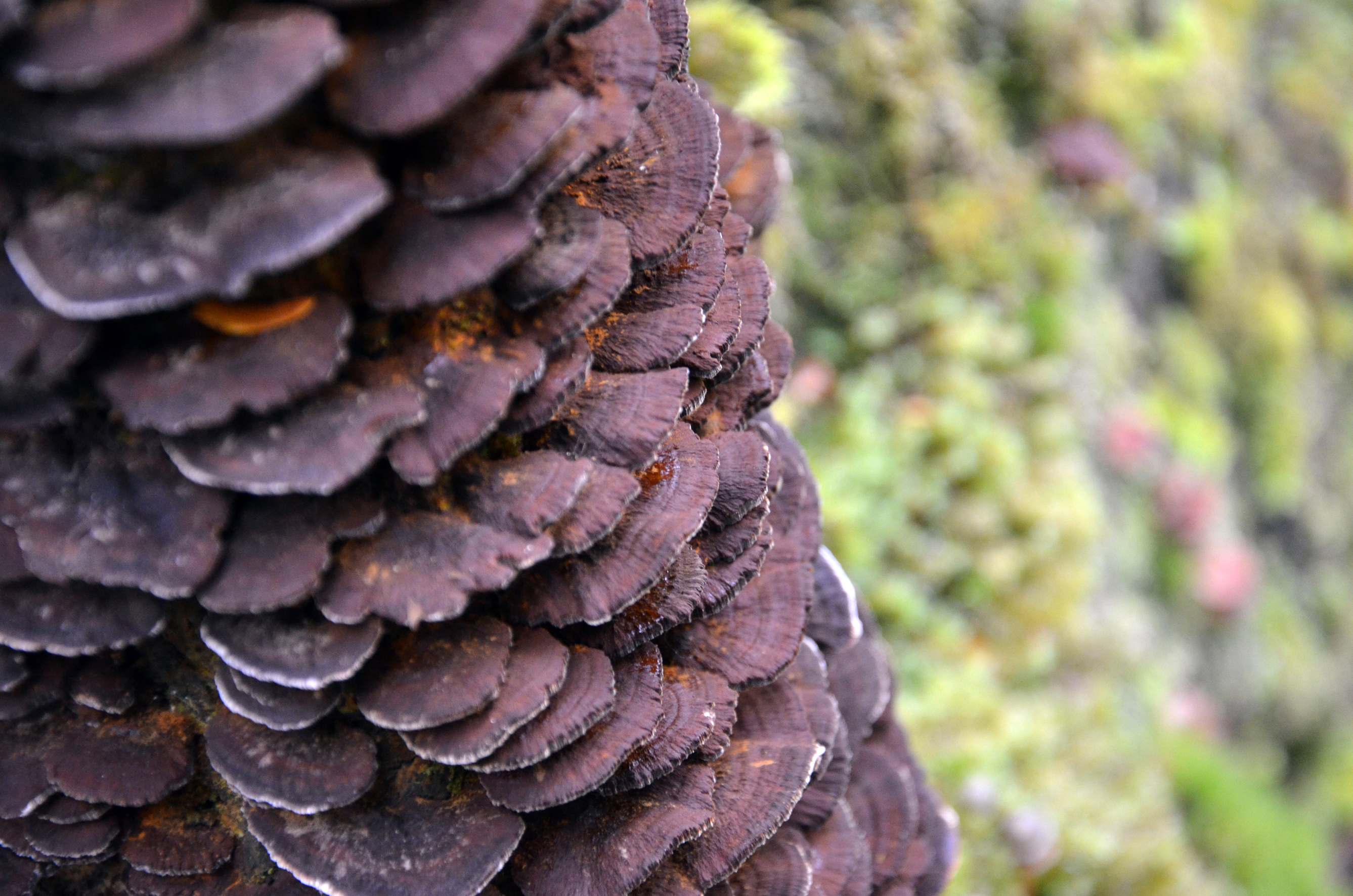
- At Lake Monowai, New Zealand

Scientific classification
- Domain: Eukaryota
- Kingdom: Fungi
- Division: Basidiomycota
- Class: Agaricomycetes
- Order: Hymenochaetales
- Family: Hymenochaetaceae
- Genus: Inonotus
- Species: I. nothofagi

Binomial name
- Inonotus nothofagi G.Cunn. (1948)

Synonyms
- Polyporus nothofagi (G.Cunn.) B.K.Bakshi (1971)

= Inonotus nothofagi =

Species of fungus

Inonotus nothofagi is a species of fungus in the family Hymenochaetaceae. It is parasitic, and causes a white rot in the wood it infects. First described scientifically by mycologist George Herriot Cunningham, it is found in Australia and New Zealand where it infects Nothofagus cunninghamii, and India, where it grows on oak.
