= Kestřany =

- Municipality
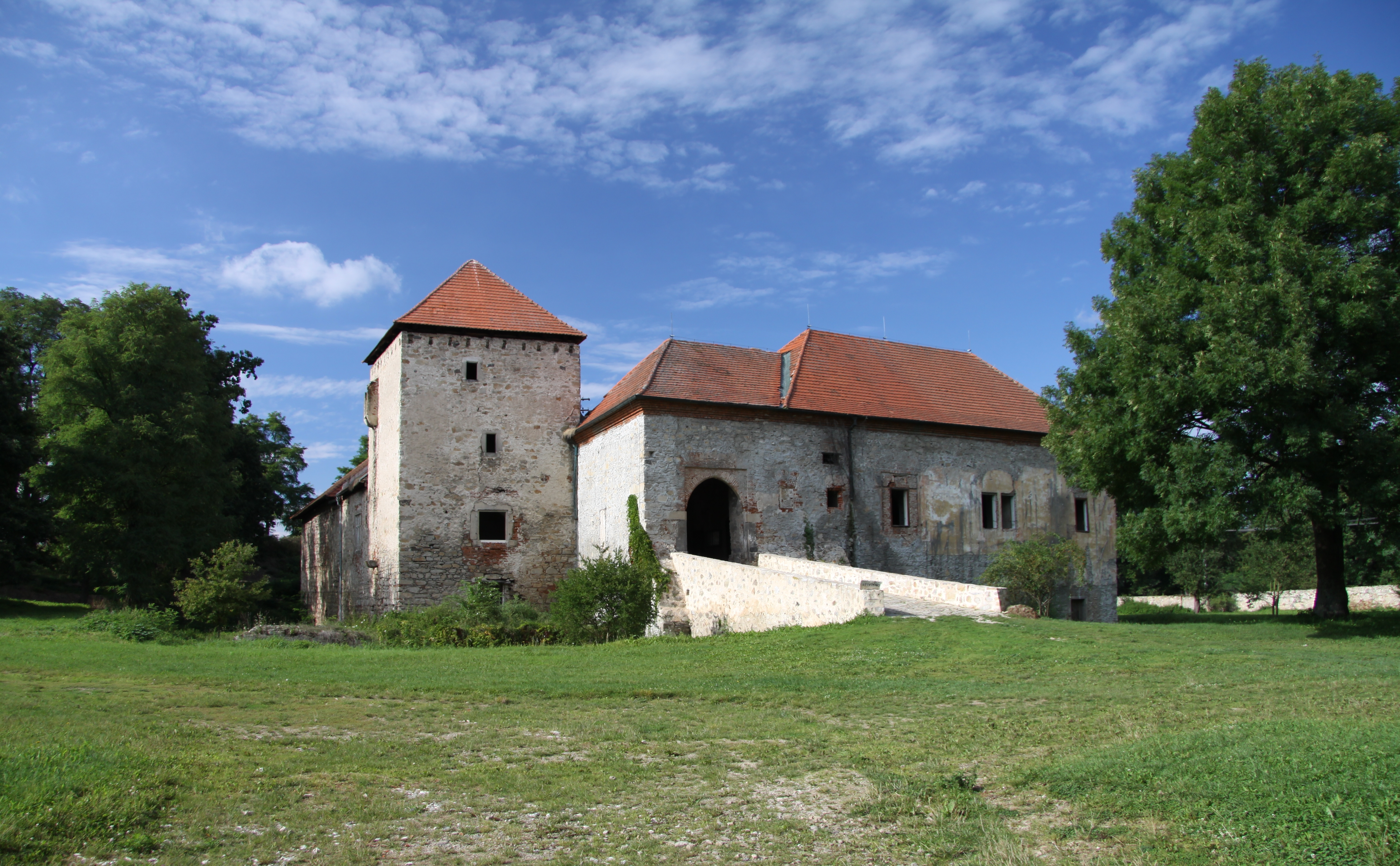
- Horní Fortress

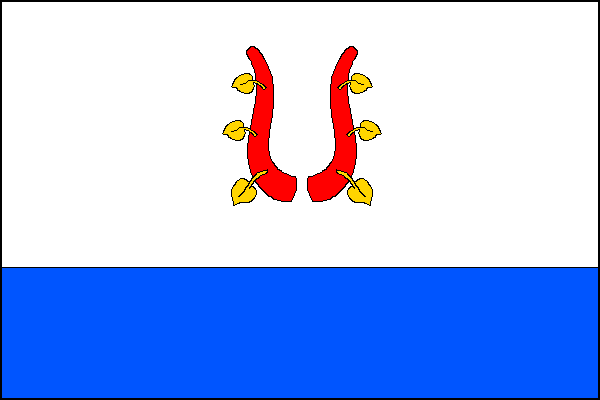
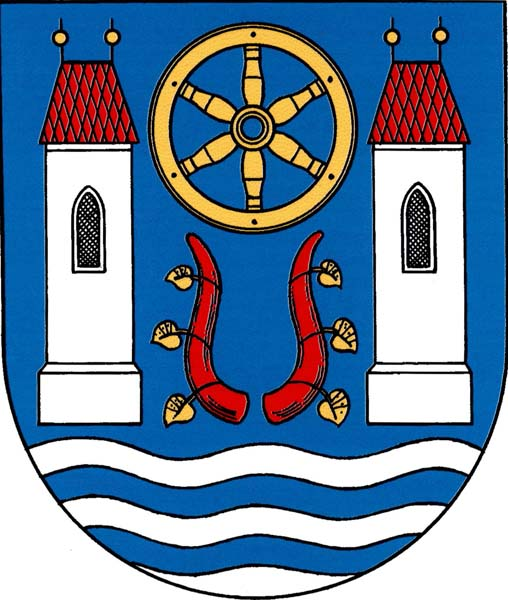
- Flag Coat of arms

- Location in the Czech Republic
- Coordinates: 49°16′9″N 14°4′21″E
- Country: Czech Republic
- Region: South Bohemian
- District: Písek
- First mentioned: 1338

Area
  - Total: 20.10 km^{2} (7.76 sq mi)
- Elevation: 373 m (1,224 ft)

Population (2026-01-01)
  - Total: 727
  - Density: 36.2/km^{2} (93.7/sq mi)
- Time zone: UTC+1 (CET)
  - Summer (DST): UTC+2 (CEST)
- Postal code: 398 21
- Website: www.kestrany-pisecko.cz

Kestřany is a municipality and village in Písek District in the South Bohemian Region of the Czech Republic. It has about 700 inhabitants.

== Administrative division ==
Kestřany consists of three municipal parts (in brackets population according to the 2021 census):

- Kestřany (489)
- Lhota u Kestřan (39)
- Zátaví (205)

== Etymology ==
The name Kestřany is probably derived from Kestra, which was the name of the first settler. His name has origin in the Czech word kostra, meaning 'skeleton'.

== Geography ==
Kestřany is located about 6 kilometres (4 mi) southwest of Písek and 42 km (26 mi) northwest of České Budějovice. The southwestern part of the municipal territory with the Kestřany village lies České Budějovice Basin and the northeastern part lies in the Tábor Uplands.

The Otava River flows through the municipality. The territory is rich in fishponds. The largest pond is Řežabinec, which is a part of the Řežabinec National Nature Monument.

=== Climate ===
Climate data for Kestřany
Month	Jan	Feb	Mar	Apr	May	Jun	Jul	Aug	Sep	Oct	Nov	Dec	Year
Daily mean °C (°F)	−0.2 (31.6)	0.3 (32.5)	4.4 (39.9)	10.5 (50.9)	14.4 (57.9)	18.0 (64.4)	19.9 (67.8)	18.7 (65.7)	14.8 (58.6)	9.3 (48.7)	4.8 (40.6)	0.7 (33.3)	9.6 (49.3)

== History ==
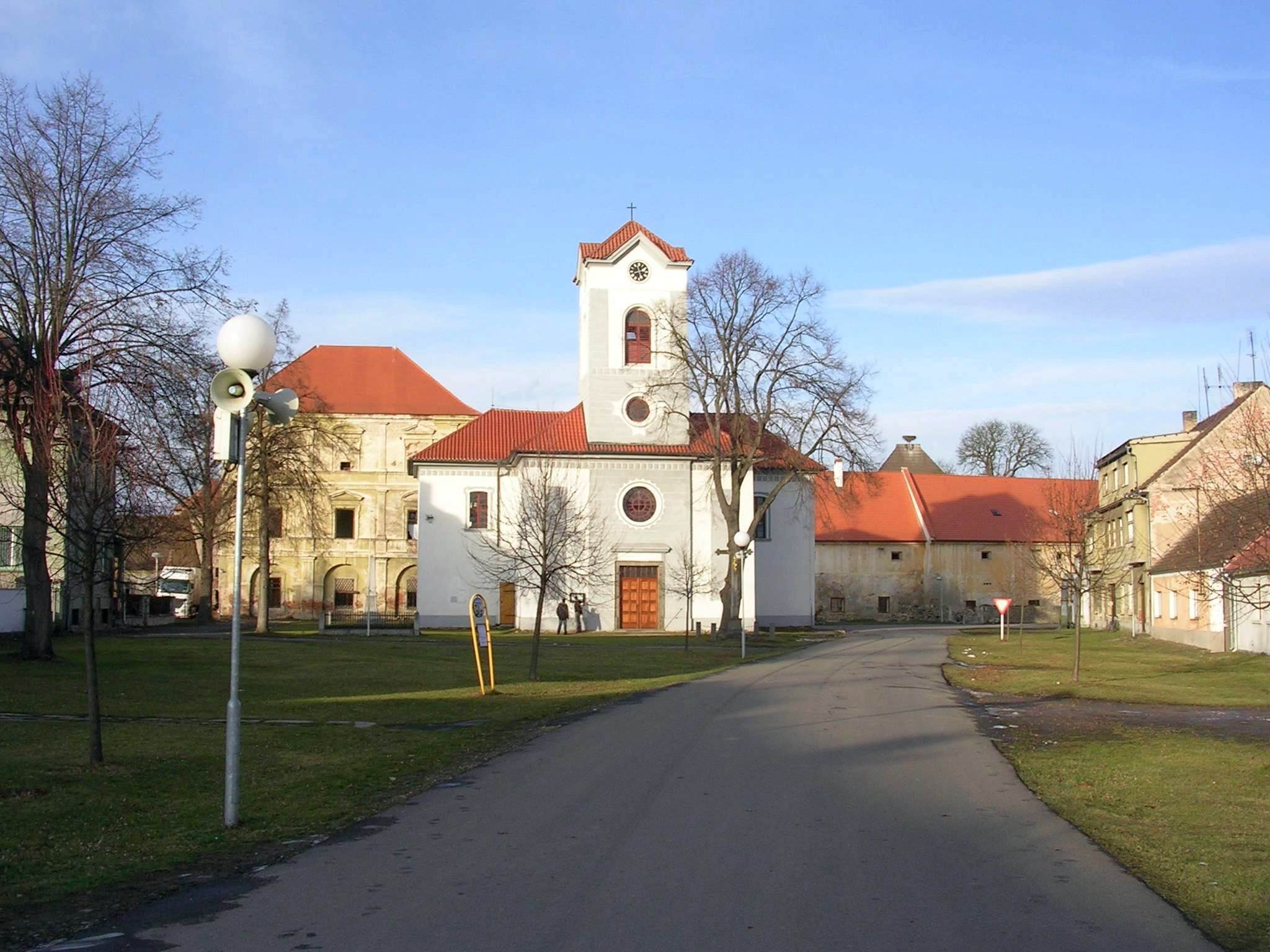
Church of Saint Catherine

The first written mention of the fortress Horní tvrz is from 1315. The first written mention of Kestřany is from 1338.

== Demographics ==
Historical population

Year	Pop.	±%
1869	961	—
1880	1,052	+9.5%
1890	1,012	−3.8%
1900	1,025	+1.3%
1910	944	−7.9%

Year	Pop.	±%
1921	957	+1.4%
1930	874	−8.7%
1950	722	−17.4%
1961	729	+1.0%
1970	657	−9.9%

Year	Pop.	±%
1980	600	−8.7%
1991	617	+2.8%
2001	641	+3.9%
2011	678	+5.8%
2021	733	+8.1%

Source: Censuses

== Transport ==
The southern part of the municipal territory is briefly crossed by the České Budějovice–Strakonice railway line. The nearest train station in is Čejetice-Sudoměř.

== Sights ==
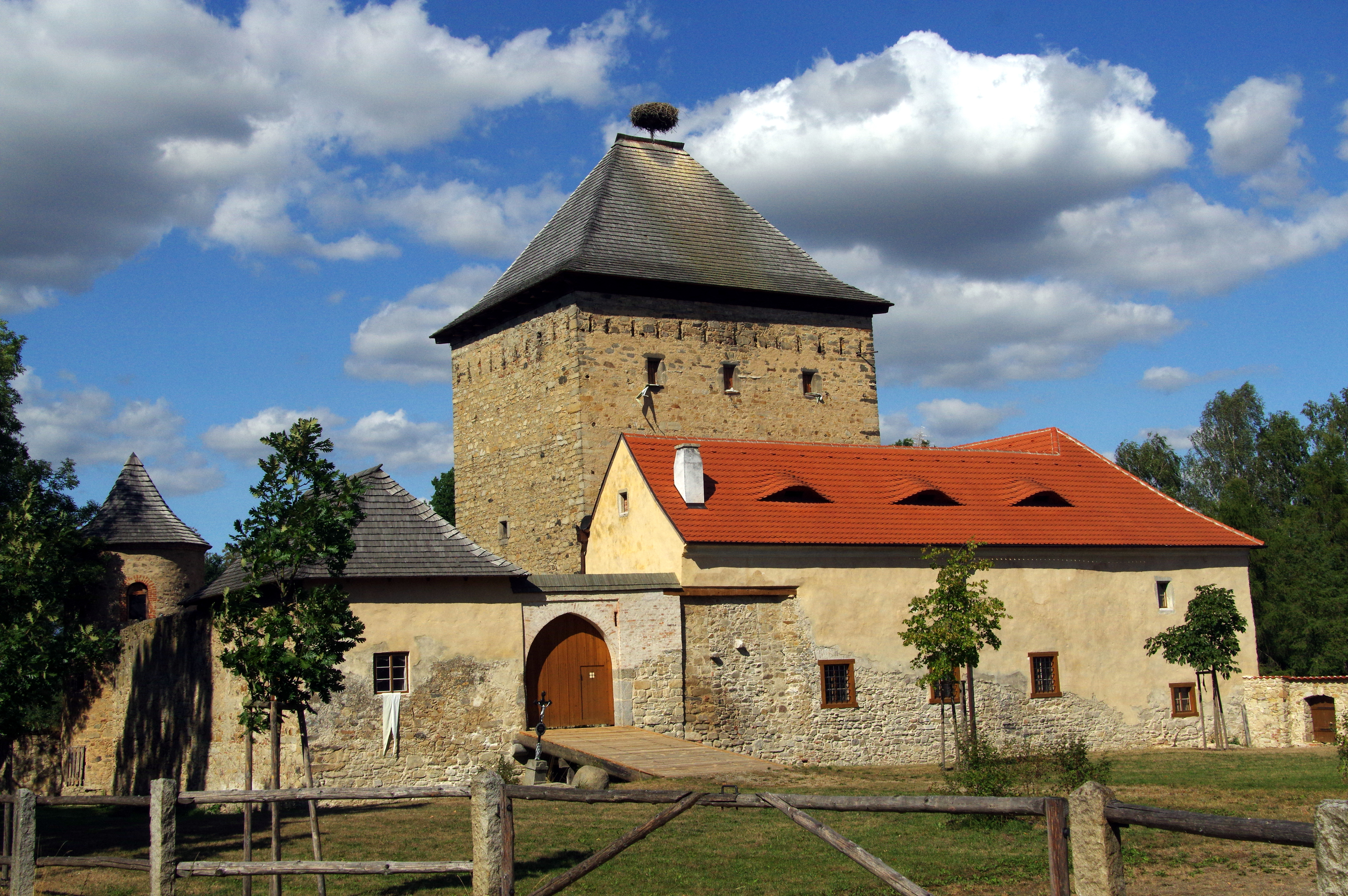
Dolní tvrz

Kestřany is known for a complex of two Gothic fortresses and one early Baroque castle. The fortresses were built in the 13th century and the castle was added in 1651. Only the fortress Horní tvrz is open to the public, but these monuments are gradually repaired and their opening is planned for the future.
