= Inonotus chrysomarginatus =

Scientific classification
- Domain: Eukaryota
- Kingdom: Fungi
- Division: Basidiomycota
- Class: Agaricomycetes
- Order: Hymenochaetales
- Family: Hymenochaetaceae
- Genus: Inonotus
- Species: I. chrysomarginatus

Binomial name
- Inonotus chrysomarginatus Cui & Dai, 2011

Species of fungus

Inonotus chrysomarginatus is a species of fungus in the family Hymenochaetaceae. It is distinguished by having an annual to perennial growth habit, pileate basidiocarps (with a yellowish margin), setal hyphae and hooked hymenial setae, and subglobose, yellowish, thick-walled cyanophilous basidiospores.
