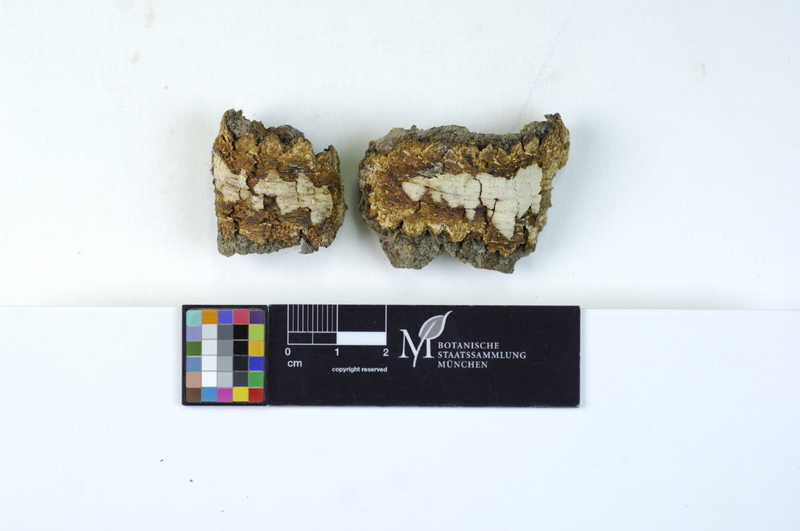

Scientific classification
- Domain: Eukaryota
- Kingdom: Fungi
- Division: Basidiomycota
- Class: Agaricomycetes
- Order: Hymenochaetales
- Family: Hymenochaetaceae
- Genus: Inonotus
- Species: I. hastifer

Binomial name
- Inonotus hastifer Pouzar

= Inonotus hastifer =

Species of fungus

Inonotus hastifer, is a species of fungus in the family Hymenochaetaceae, first described by Zdeněk Pouzar in 1981.

== Distribution and habitat ==
It was noted in North America and Europe, with the most sightings in Europe. It grows in deciduous forest, on dead trunks of hornbeam and beech.
