= Inonotus munzii =

Scientific classification
- Domain: Eukaryota
- Kingdom: Fungi
- Division: Basidiomycota
- Class: Agaricomycetes
- Order: Hymenochaetales
- Family: Hymenochaetaceae
- Genus: Inonotus
- Species: I. munzii

Binomial name
- Inonotus munzii (Lloyd) Gilb., (1969)

Synonyms
- Polyporus munzii

Species of fungus

Inonotus munzii is a plant pathogen that causes wood rot on Platanus species.
