= Řežabinec =

Protected area in the Czech Republic

- IUCN category IV (habitat/species management area)
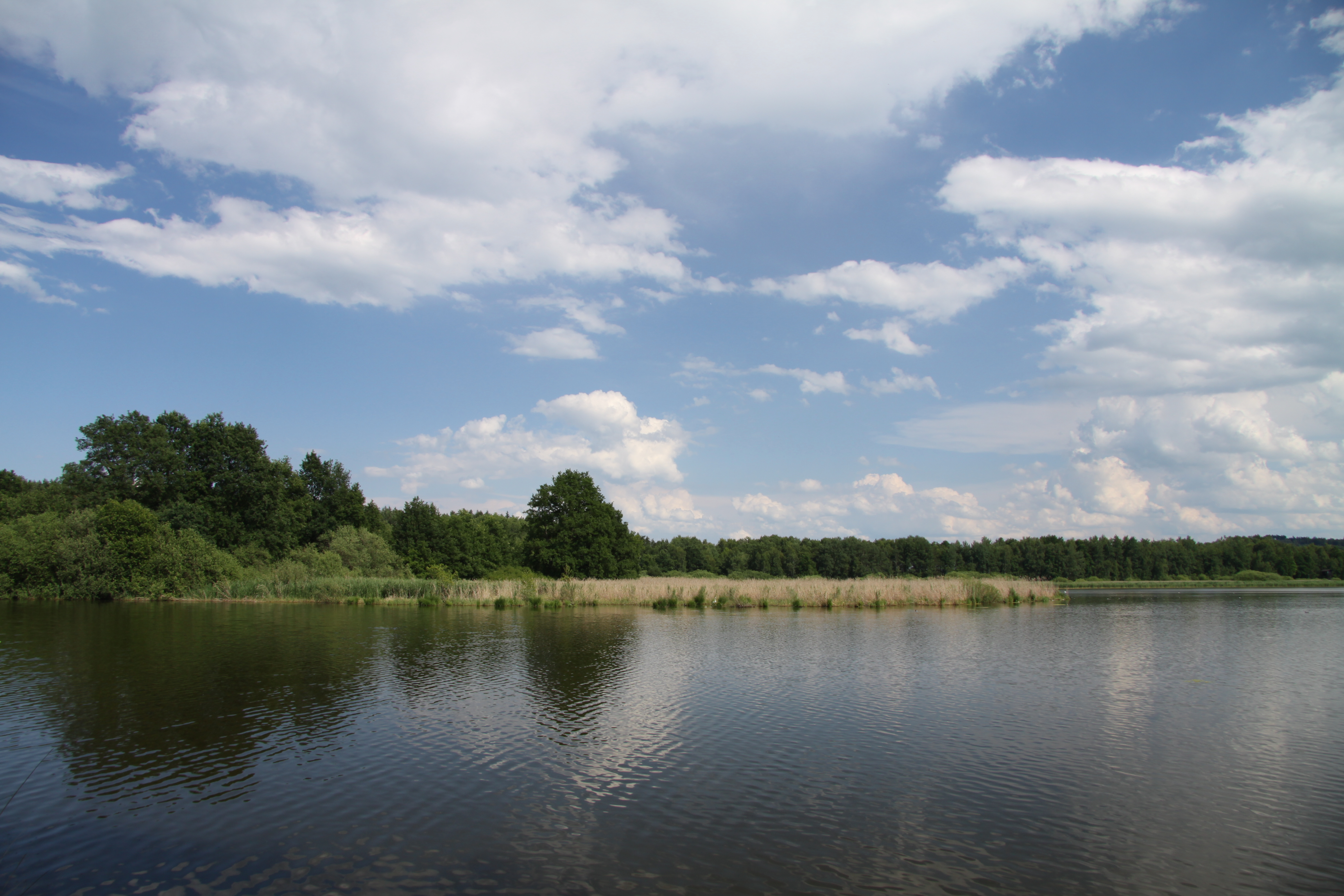
- Řežabinec pond

- Location within Czech Republic
- Location: South Bohemian Region, Czech Republic
- Coordinates: 49°15′10″N 14°5′31″E
- Area: 116.0 ha (287 acres)
- Max. elevation: 378 m (1,240 ft)
- Min. elevation: 370 m (1,210 ft)
- Established: 19 November 1949
- Operator: AOPK ČR

Řežabinec (formerly Řežabinec a Řežabinecké tůně, lit. 'Řežabinec and pools of Řežabinec') is a fish pond and a national nature monument in Kestřany in the South Bohemian Region in the Czech Republic. Until 2021, it had conservation status a national nature reserve.

It is situated among the villages of Lhota u Kestřan, Ražice and Putim. The area is protected due to the presence of valuable littoral ecosystems. This environment provides habitat suitable for many species of birds, who use this area for breeding, and other animal species. The protected area includes Řežabinec pond itself, along with adjacent pools caused by the flooding of old medieval mining holes, and a significant archaeological site on neighboring Pikárna hill, where there was extensive human settlement in the Paleolithic and Mesolithic.

The pond was constructed in a former river bed of the Otava River, and a wetland developed. The construction started in 1530 at the instigation of the Lord of Zvíkov Castle, Kryštof of Švamberk. Gradually the water area became overgrown with littoral vegetation consisting mainly of reeds, and this valuable vegetation covered approximately 40% of the Řežabinec area. However excessive fish production, mostly in the 1970s and 1980s, resulted in damage to the protected area and extinction of many species. Nowadays reed coverage has declined to approximately 15% of the Řežabinec pond area. As of 2011, the pond is state-owned and managed by Nature Conservation Agency of the Czech Republic, which seeks to restore species diversity and minimize negative human impact.

== Climate ==
The nature reservation is one of the warmest places in the southwest of the Czech Republic. The climate here is classified as Cfb by the Köppen-Geiger system. Number of degree heating days is 3454 and annual horizontal solar irradiation is 3090 Wh/m2/day.

Climate data for Kestřany
Month	Jan	Feb	Mar	Apr	May	Jun	Jul	Aug	Sep	Oct	Nov	Dec	Year
Mean daily maximum °C (°F)	1.0 (33.8)	2.7 (36.9)	8.4 (47.1)	13.8 (56.8)	19.0 (66.2)	21.9 (71.4)	23.9 (75.0)	23.4 (74.1)	19.3 (66.7)	13.2 (55.8)	6.2 (43.2)	2.6 (36.7)	13.0 (55.4)
Daily mean °C (°F)	−2.1 (28.2)	−1.0 (30.2)	3.6 (38.5)	8.2 (46.8)	13.1 (55.6)	16.2 (61.2)	18 (64)	17.5 (63.5)	13.7 (56.7)	8.5 (47.3)	3.1 (37.6)	−0.1 (31.8)	8.2 (46.8)
Mean daily minimum °C (°F)	−5.2 (22.6)	−4.6 (23.7)	−1.1 (30.0)	2.6 (36.7)	7.2 (45.0)	10.5 (50.9)	12.1 (53.8)	11.7 (53.1)	8.2 (46.8)	3.8 (38.8)	0.0 (32.0)	−2.8 (27.0)	3.5 (38.3)
Average precipitation mm (inches)	44 (1.7)	38 (1.5)	43 (1.7)	44 (1.7)	75 (3.0)	84 (3.3)	90 (3.5)	80 (3.1)	57 (2.2)	43 (1.7)	43 (1.7)	49 (1.9)	690 (27.2)

Climate data for Řežabinec
Month	Jan	Feb	Mar	Apr	May	Jun	Jul	Aug	Sep	Oct	Nov	Dec	Year
Daily mean °C (°F)	−0.2 (31.6)	−0.6 (30.9)	4.8 (40.6)	9.8 (49.6)	13.6 (56.5)	17.2 (63.0)	19.9 (67.8)	19.3 (66.7)	14.4 (57.9)	9.1 (48.4)	5.2 (41.4)	1.3 (34.3)	9.5 (49.1)

== Fauna ==
24 species of aquatic molluscs were found in the Řežabinec National Nature Monument: 17 species of freshwater snails and 7 species of bivalves. Among the endangered mollusc species, the most significant finding is the occurrence of the bivalve Euglesa pseudosphaerium, which is critically endangered within the Czech Republic and occurs only at this single location.
