= Inonotus ludovicianus =

Scientific classification
- Domain: Eukaryota
- Kingdom: Fungi
- Division: Basidiomycota
- Class: Agaricomycetes
- Order: Hymenochaetales
- Family: Hymenochaetaceae
- Genus: Inonotus
- Species: I. ludovicianus

Binomial name
- Inonotus ludovicianus (Pat.) Bondartsev & Singer (1941)

Synonyms
- Xanthochrous ludovicianus Pat. (1908); Polyporus ludovicianus (Pat.) Sacc. & Trotter (1912); Inocutis ludoviciana (Pat.) T.Wagner & M.Fisch. (2002)

Species of fungus

Inonotus ludovicianus is a species of fungus in the family Hymenochaetaceae. A plant pathogen, it is found in the southwestern United States and Louisiana.
