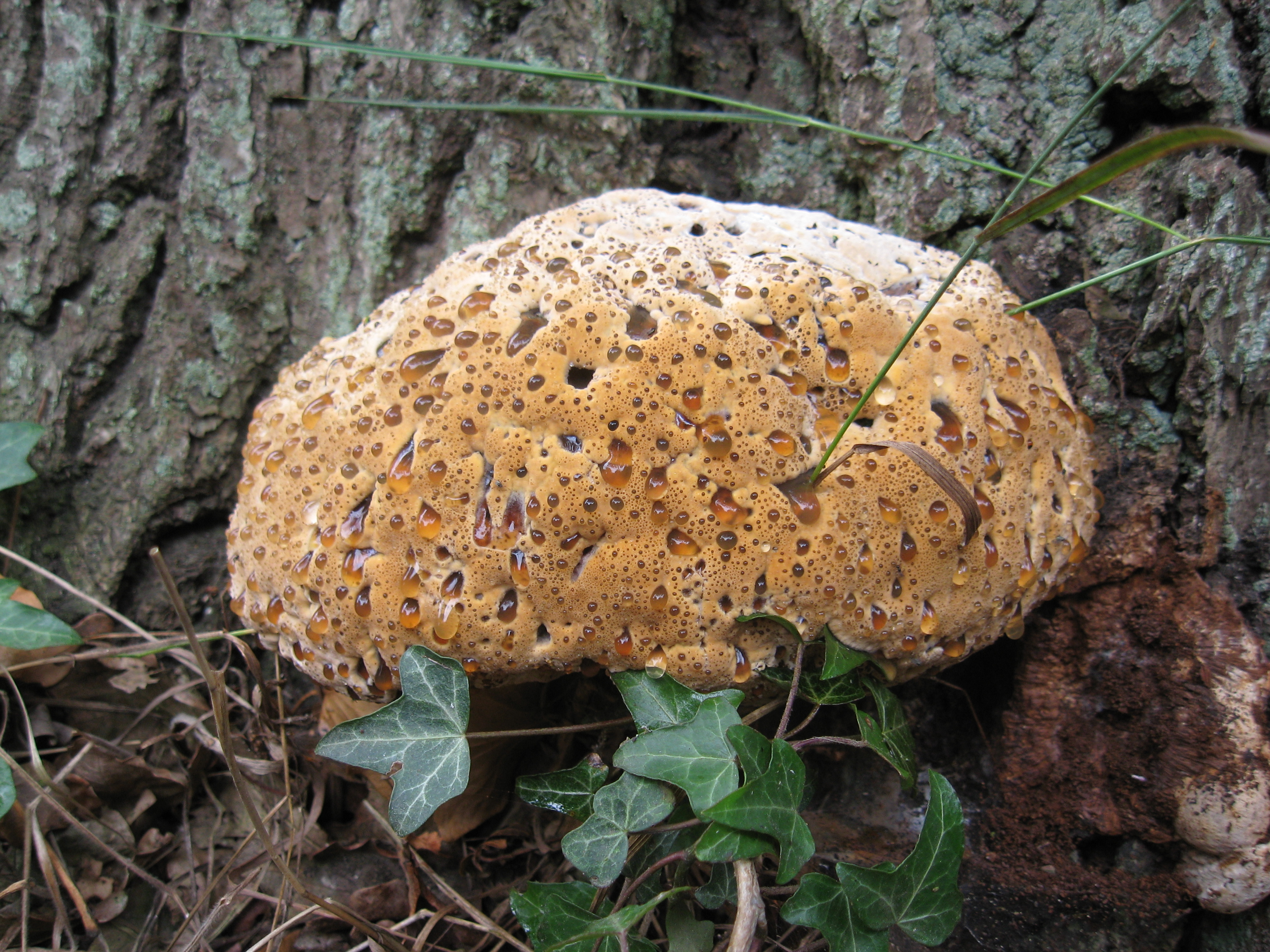
- Inonotus dryadeus on an oak tree

Scientific classification
- Kingdom: Fungi
- Division: Basidiomycota
- Class: Agaricomycetes
- Order: Hymenochaetales
- Family: Hymenochaetaceae
- Genus: Inonotus
- Species: I. dryadeus

Binomial name
- Inonotus dryadeus (Pers.: Fr.) Murr.

Synonyms
- Polyporus dryadeus Pers.: Fr.

= Inonotus dryadeus =

Bracket fungus that attacks oak trees

Inonotus dryadeus (syn. Pseudoinonotus dryadeus), commonly known as oak bracket, warted oak polypore, weeping polypore or weeping conk, is an inedible species of fungus belonging to the genus Inonotus, which consists of bracket fungi with fibrous flesh. Most often found growing at the base of oak trees, it causes white rot and decay of the trunks. It secretes an amber liquid which weeps from tubes in its upper surface.

== Description ==
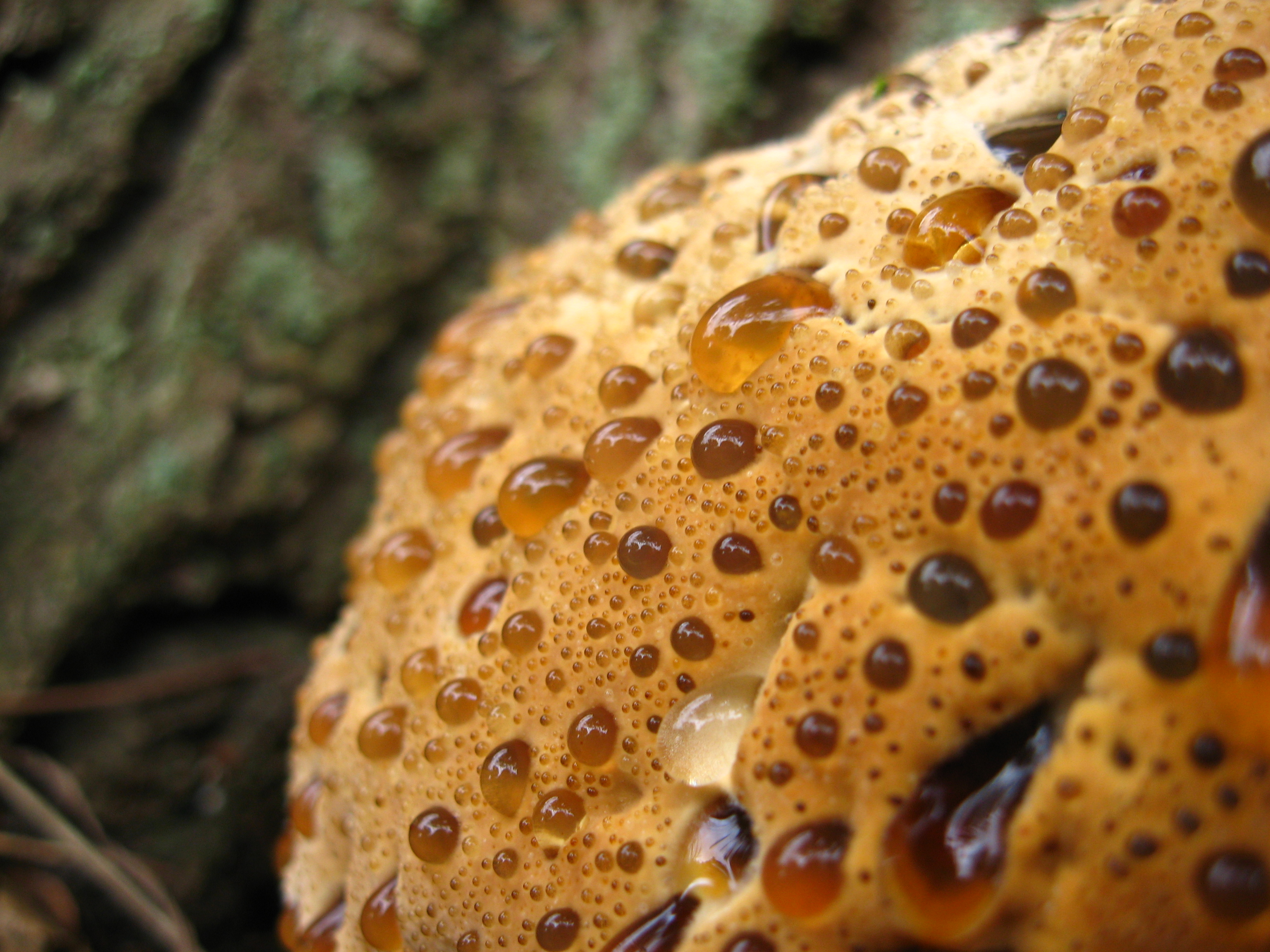
A close-up of the fruit body showing its exudate.

The thick fruiting body of Inonotus dryadeus varies in size from 5 to 30 centimetres (2.0 to 11.8 in) in width, although specimens up to 75 centimetres (30 in) have been found. Its velvety upper surface is cream to rusty brown with a yellower margin, and is pitted with tubes up to 3 cm deep which ooze an orange-brown liquid consisting of excess water and metabolic byproducts when the fruit body is young, hence the name "weeping conk".

On the buff underside there are 4 to 6 fine pores per millimetre. These are initially greyish-white but mature to yellow or ochre.

The flesh is soft and fibrous, yellow-brown in colour and has an unpleasant odour.

=== Spores ===
The spores are white, smooth and globose, with dimensions in the range of 6.5–8×7–8 μm.

=== Similar species ===
I. cuticularis grows on beech, sycamore and elm.

== Habitat and distribution ==
Inonotus dryadeus is a parasitic saprobic fungus, with spores entering wounds on broadleaf trees (predominantly oak, although sometimes maple, elm and chestnut). The fungus is primarily a root decay fungus, rotting the below-ground parts of roots. Detection is often difficult if the conks have not developed. The fruiting conks appear close to the ground on the trunk, thickly attached, and either singly or in groups.

It has been observed in North America and temperate northern Europe, where it is described as widespread but locally common. Fruiting occurs in summer and autumn, but fruit bodies may overwinter and persist for several years, eventually turning black and cracked. Presence of a fruit body may indicate that the mycelium has penetrated and weakened the root crown of the tree.
