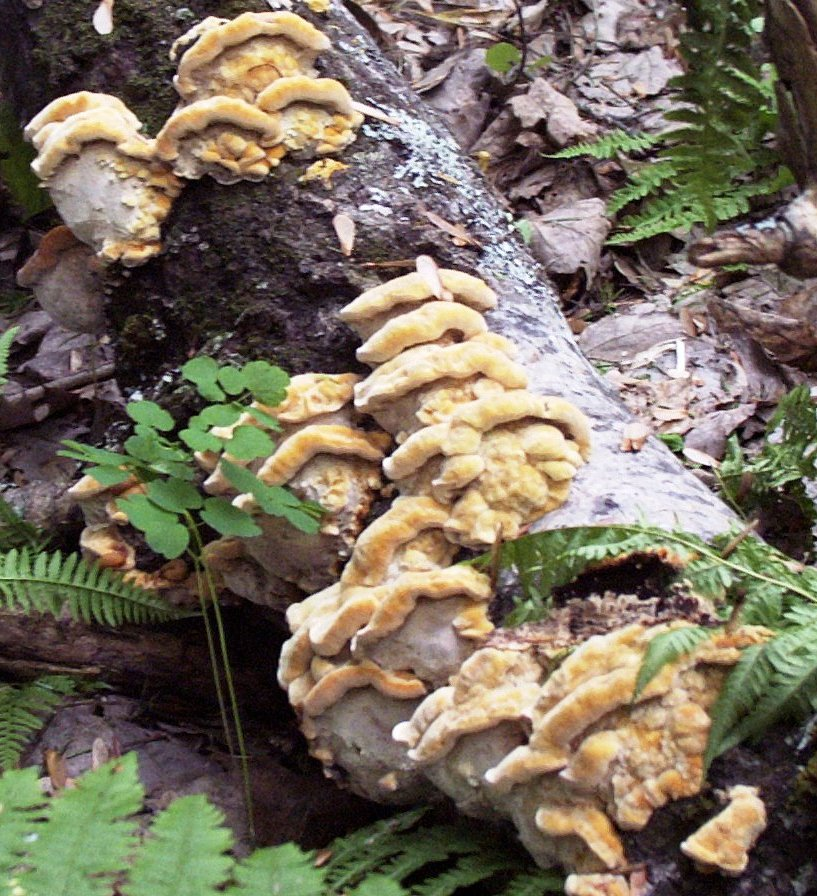

Scientific classification
- Domain: Eukaryota
- Kingdom: Fungi
- Division: Basidiomycota
- Class: Agaricomycetes
- Order: Hymenochaetales
- Family: Hymenochaetaceae
- Genus: Inonotus
- Species: I. cuticularis

Binomial name
- Inonotus cuticularis (Bull.) P.Karst. (1879)

Synonyms
- Boletus cuticularis Bull. (1790); Polyporus cuticularis (Bull.) Fr. (1821); Xanthochrous cuticularis (Bull.) Pat. (1900); Polystictoides cuticularis (Bull.) Lázaro Ibiza (1916)

= Inonotus cuticularis =

Species of fungus

Inonotus cuticularis, the clustered bracket, is a species of fungus in the family Hymenochaetaceae. A plant pathogen, it has a circumpolar distribution, and is found in the temperate zone from eastern U.S. and Canada to Japan, China, Russia and south to central Europe.
