= Yellow waterlily =

Yellow waterlily is a common name for several plants and may refer to:

- Nymphaea species, especially:
  - Nymphaea mexicana, native to the United States and Mexico
- Nuphar species, especially:
  - Nuphar lutea
  - Nuphar polysepala, native to western North America
