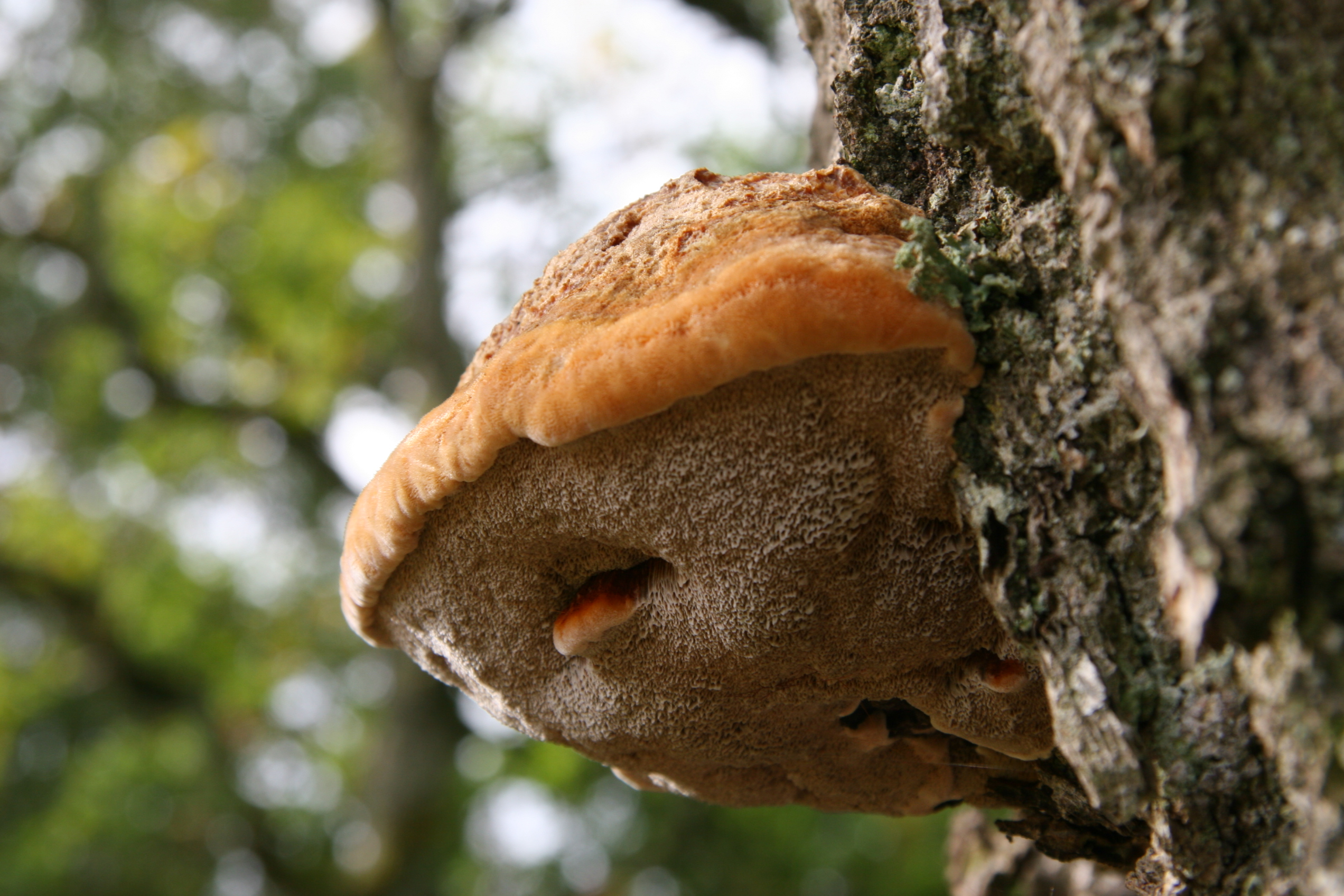

Scientific classification
- Domain: Eukaryota
- Kingdom: Fungi
- Division: Basidiomycota
- Class: Agaricomycetes
- Order: Hymenochaetales
- Family: Hymenochaetaceae
- Genus: Inonotus
- Species: I. dryophilus

Binomial name
- Inonotus dryophilus (Berk.) Murrill, (1904)

= Inonotus dryophilus =

Species of fungus

Inonotus dryophilus is a plant pathogen.
