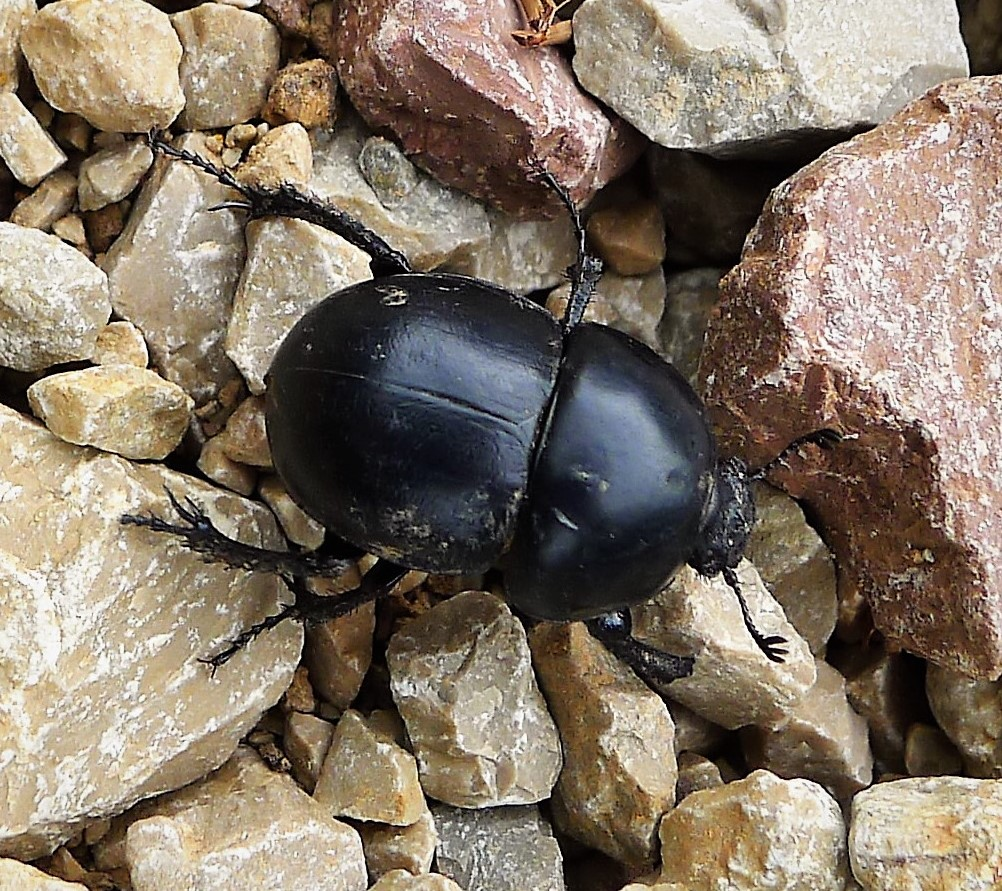

Scientific classification
- Kingdom: Animalia
- Phylum: Arthropoda
- Clade: Pancrustacea
- Class: Insecta
- Order: Coleoptera
- Suborder: Polyphaga
- Infraorder: Scarabaeiformia
- Family: Geotrupidae
- Genus: Thorectes
- Species: T. lusitanicus

Binomial name
- Thorectes lusitanicus (Jekel, 1865)

= Thorectes lusitanicus =

Species of beetle

Thorectes lusitanicus is a medium-sized dung beetle ranging from 30–175 mg in dry body weight. It is flightless with strong mandibles that allow it to exploit dry dung. It is native to the southern Iberian Peninsula. It is a tunneller that builds shallow tunnels several meters from the site of a dung deposition and transports the dung into the tunnel. Once the dung is in the tunnel, females of this species lay their eggs within it.

Thorectes lusitanicus is notable for its acorn consumption since researchers previously believed that dung beetles did not consume seeds. In fact, laboratory studies reveal that this unique dung beetle species actually prefers acorns over herbivore dung. Further studies illustrate that acorn consumption leads to many physiological and developmental advantages in T. lusitanicus, such as significantly increased fat body development, increased resistance to cold temperatures, greater ovary development, and greater resistance to generalist pathogens. The acorn consumption of T. lusitanicus also confers ecophysiological and reproductive advantages for the oak tree, as it leads to the beetle acting as a secondary seed disperser. Many researchers are interested in the evolutionary relationship between apterism and acorn consumption in T. lusitanicus. Furthermore, important symbiotic relationships within the gut microbiome of this beetle species facilitate its unique polyphagous behavior.

The life cycle of T. lusitanicus starts in autumn when females lay their eggs in herbivore dung. After the offspring develop for 6-7 months, they emerge as adults in the spring. A common livestock veterinary medicine, Ivermectin, poses a serious threat to Thorectes lusitanicus.

== Description ==
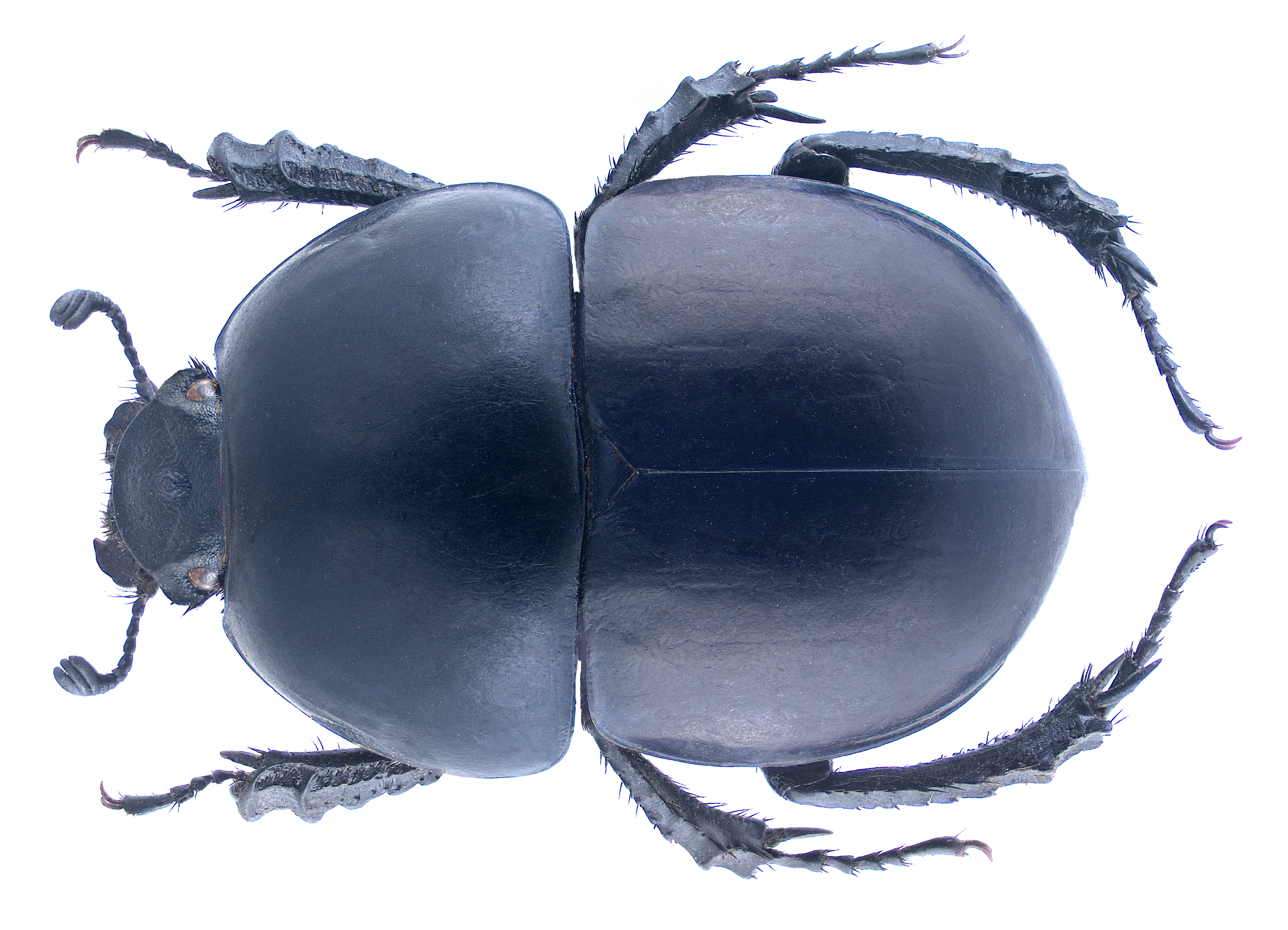
Female Thorectes lusitanicus

Thorectes lusitanicus is a species of medium-sized dung beetle. On average, they range from 130 to 175 mg in dry body weight. As a species of dung beetle, they have tibial spurs which aid them in their characteristic rolling of dung balls. Most dung beetles have notable protective sheathed wings, or elytra. Notably, T. lusitanicus, and all other members of the Geotrupidae family, are apterous, meaning they have lost the capacity to fly. This apterism is related to unique morphological changes in the Geotrupidae family, such as the fusion of their elytra and atrophy of their wing muscles. T. lusitanicus has mandibles with well-developed scissorial and molar areas, as well as strong denticles that allow it to exploit dry dung and dung-fiber, rather than dung-juice.

== Geographic range ==
Orthographic Projection of Iberia

Thorectes lusitanicus are native to the southern Iberian Peninsula, which is present-day Spain and Portugal. Within the Iberian Peninsula, this species is found in various habitats. Due to their adaptations to the arid climate of the Mediterranean, some researchers suggest that the species within the Thorectes genus are paleo-endemics, meaning they may have had a wider geographic range in the past but are now more restricted.

== Habitat ==
Researchers have noted the presence of Thorectes lusitanicus within oak forests. Studies illustrate that T. lusitanicus prefers the microsite of trees with no shrub understory in oak forests. This is likely due to an abundance of acorns and low competition from rodents, since rodents tend to forage under dense shrub cover to avoid predation.

== Home range ==
Dung beetles utilize three primary nesting strategies. Some species tunnel directly under, or very close to, the dung deposition; these species are referred to as paracoprid. Others build their nests within the dung patch directly and are referred to as endocoprid. The last nesting strategy is building shallow tunnels several meters from the site of the dung deposition and transporting the dung into the tunnel; species that utilize this strategy, like T. lusitanicus, are referred to as telocoprid. More specifically, researchers classify T. lusitanicus as a telephagic tunneller. This species has been observed transporting dung up to several meters away from its original deposition site, where it then nests 10–15 cm deep.

Dung beetles store dung underground to reduce resource competition and increase the preservation of the dung itself. Since dung beetles lay their eggs within the dung, burying the dung also serves to protect developing larvae from predators. Female dung beetles sort and arrange the dung, while males transport it through the tunnel. Because T. lusitanicus requires adequate amounts of dung for reproduction, studies found that oak forests that had large populations of deer or cattle supported higher populations of T. lusitanicus.

== Food resources ==
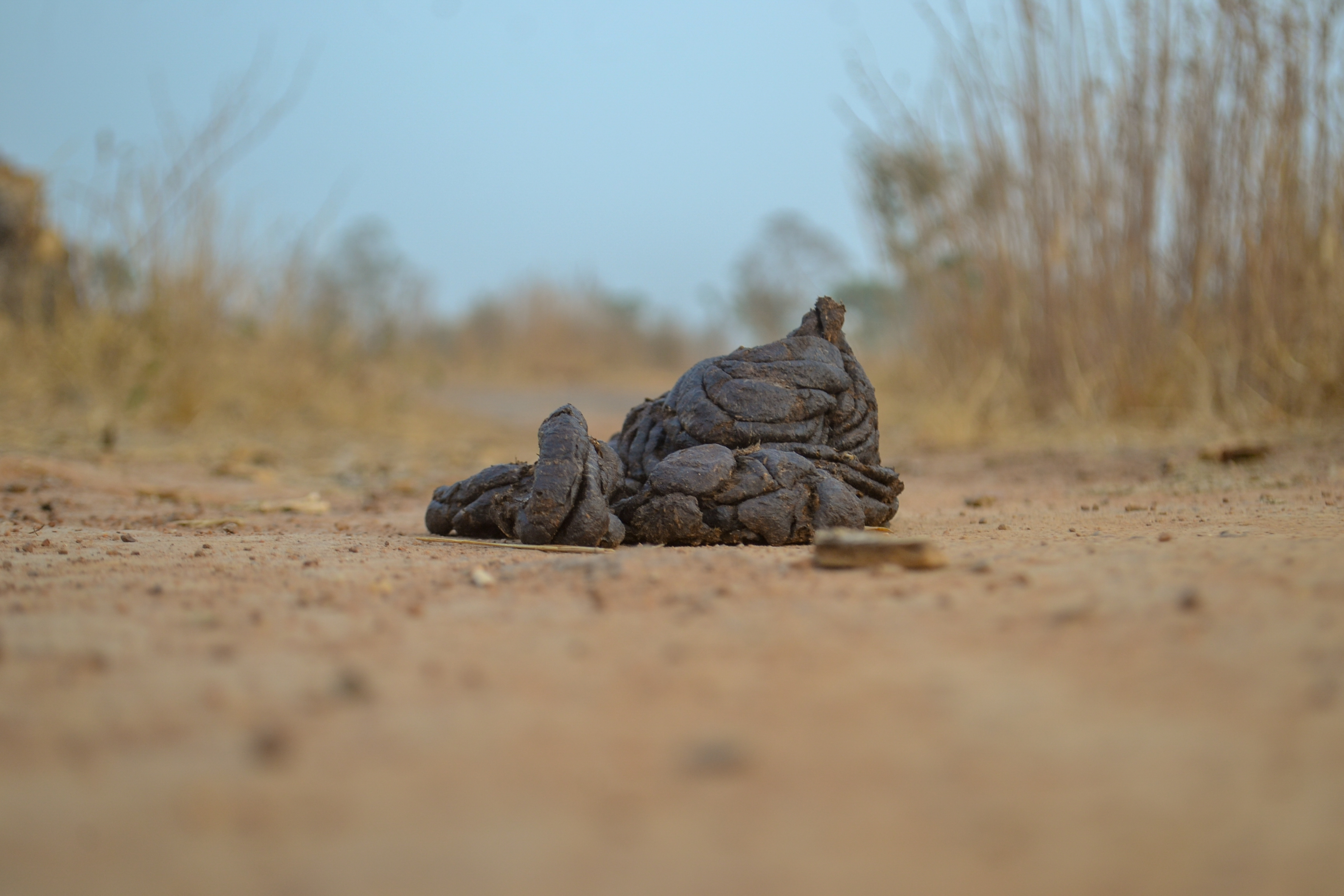
Dried cow dung

=== Diet ===
Thorectes lusitanicus is remarkably different from the other dung beetles in the Palearctic region because it is polyphagous, meaning it feeds on many different types of food. While some tropical dung species consume carrion and fruit, Palaearctic dung beetles primarily consume the dung of herbivores and omnivores. Like other Palaearctic dung beetles, T. lusitanicus has exhibited specific dung preferences. In the case of this species, T. lusitanicus prefers rabbit dung over cow dung, which researchers hypothesize is related to the relatively low water content of rabbit dung.

While T. lusitanicus larvae rely on dung consumption, adult T. lusitanicus have been observed consuming acorns, fungi, fruits, carrion, and the dung of various mammals. Researchers used to believe that dung beetles did not consume seeds, but more recent laboratory studies have since shown that adult T. lusitanicus prefer acorn consumption over the consumption of large herbivore dung. Furthermore, this beetle species exhibits preferences regarding the oak species of the acorns it consumes, which aligns with the patterns observed in acorn-feeding vertebrates. In order to consume an acorn, a T. lusitanicus beetle will slightly bury it in the soil and then gnaw at one of the ends. After the few weeks it takes to fully consume the acorn, the beetle may stay inside the empty pericarp and hibernate. However, since dung is required for nesting and larvae feeding and acorns are only abundant seasonally, researchers hypothesize that dung remains the main food source of wild T. lusitanicus throughout the year.

==== Benefits of acorn consumption ====
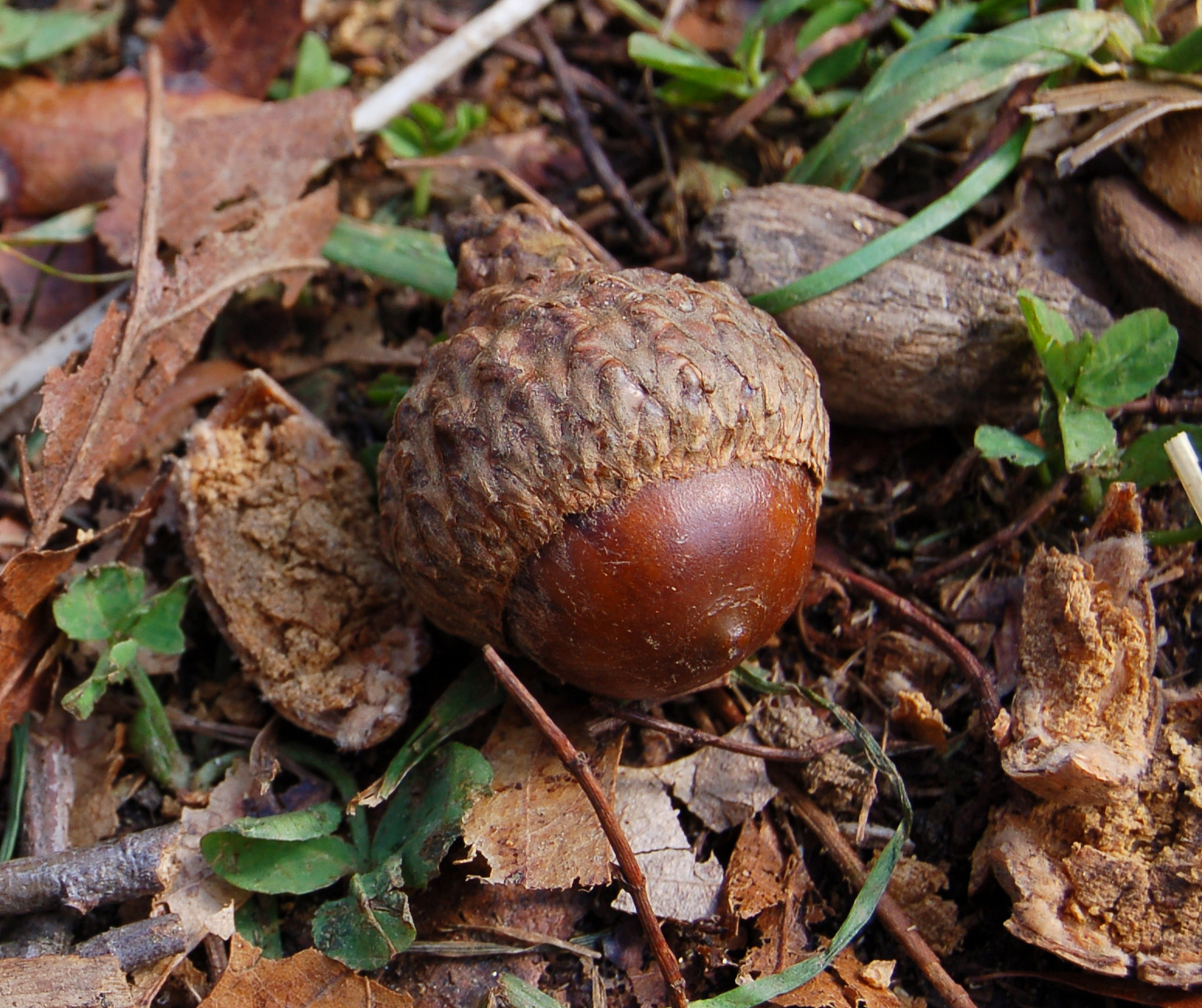
Oak Acorn

Acorns have two primary types of polyunsaturated fatty acids that adequately satisfy the fatty acid nutritional requirement of most insects. They also contain larger amounts of proteins and lipids than cow dung, which is often used as a comparative diet in laboratory studies that investigate the effects of an acorn diet on Thorectes lusitanicus. Recent studies have discovered that acorn consumption not only satisfies a dietary need for the species, but it also leads to many physiological and developmental advantages in T. lusitanicus.

As one may expect, consumption of these more favorable nutrients found in acorns has been experimentally shown to significantly increase fat body development in T. lusitanicus. Hemolymph composition, which is related to thermal tolerance in beetles, is dependent on the fatty acid and protein synthesis occurring in the fat body. Therefore, acorn consumption also affects hemolymph composition and has been shown to increase resistance to cold temperatures in T. lusitanicus. Laboratory experiments even show that the T. lusitanicus beetles feeding on acorns were more active than those feeding on cow dung at both colder and more moderate temperatures. These acorn-fed beetles also showed greater ovary development as well as larger and more numerous oocytes, or developing eggs, compared to the beetles fed with cow dung. In laboratory studies, T. lusitanicus fed with acorns and presented with a generalist pathogen had significantly higher levels of phenoloxidase, an enzyme that is commonly utilized to measure the immunity of insects, compared to dung-fed T. lusitanicus. This indicates acorn consumption provides greater resistance to generalist pathogens than cow dung consumption.

Researchers suggest the seasonality of acorn abundance may align with the periods where T. lusitanicus requires the greatest amount of energy since the acorns are abundant in autumn-winter, which is usually when this species reproduces and hibernates. Increased thermal tolerance and immunity increase the survival of T. lusitanicus throughout the winter, especially because starvation is known to decrease insect immunity. Furthermore, these changes may also allow T. lusitanicus to prolong its period of activity before going into hibernation.

=== Seed dispersal ===
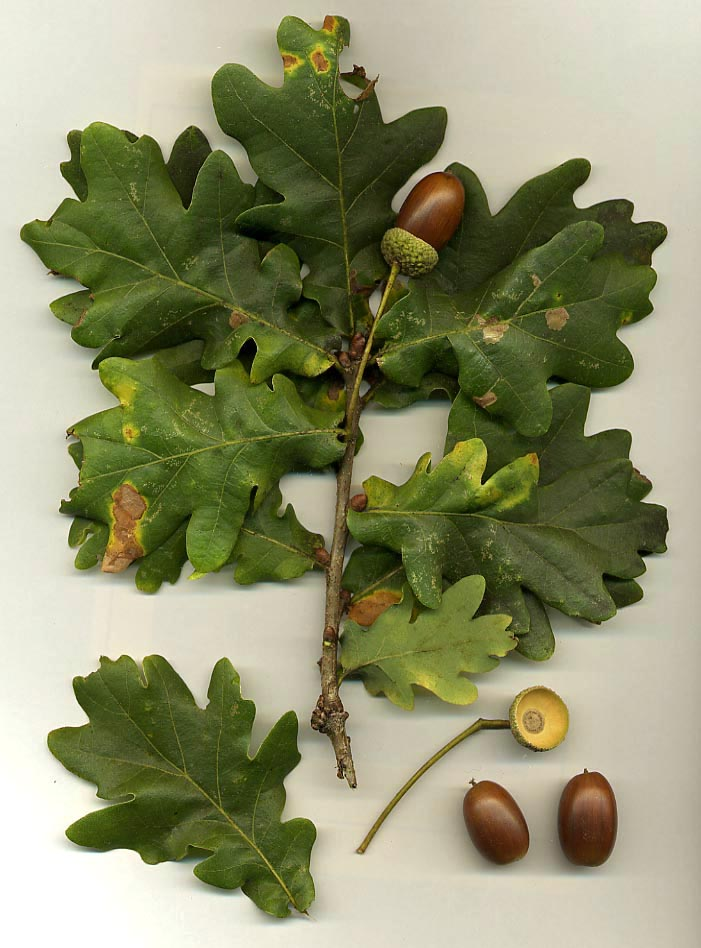
Clippings from an Oak tree

Like some tropical dung beetles, the Palaearctic Thorectes lusitanicus beetles can act as seed dispersers by burying dung that contains seeds within the soil, which increases the likelihood that those seeds become established seedlings. T. lusitanicus is unique in that it also acts as a seed disperser by burying acorns directly because they do not always eat the entire acorn. They have been observed collecting acorns and only partially consuming them before burying them in the soil, meaning they are secondary dispersers of oak acorns. By eating only a small portion of the acorn (and sometimes none at all), these beetles help the seed germinate and become a seedling, which confers ecophysiological and reproductive advantages for the oak tree. Burying the acorns protects them from more efficient seed predators, leads to the developed seedlings having deeper roots, and increases their survivorship. When compared to rodents, well-known oak seed dispersers, T. lusitanicus was qualitatively more effective. While rodents dispersed greater numbers of acorns, they also consumed more of them and buried them in less suitable micro-habitats. This has important implications for the conservation of oak forests in the Mediterranean, and researchers suggest that preservation of the interactions between T. lusitanicus and oak species is essential for Mediterranean forest conservation.

== Life history ==
The life cycle of Thorectes lusitanicus starts between September and November. After burying the dung of herbivores (including deer, sheep, goats, rabbits, and cattle), females lay their eggs in the dung. After the offspring develop for 6-7 months, they emerge as adults in the spring. T. lusitanicus conserves energy in the heat and aridity of the summertime by going into a dormant state. They become active again in the autumn.

== Physiology ==
=== Flight ===
While most dung beetles have long flight wings and can fly several miles at a time, the entire Thorectes genus is apterous, meaning these species have lost their capacity to fly. Some researchers hypothesize that dry and arid conditions facilitated the adaptation of fused elytra, as this fusion reduces water loss and allows water to be utilized for continuous respiration, which is utilized as a mechanism of thermoregulation. Other researchers are interested in the evolutionary relationship between apterism and acorn consumption in Thorectes lusitanicus. They hypothesize that the apterism may have led to the selection of alternative mechanisms to elevate body metabolism, such as the inclusion of acorns in their diet. Recent phylogenetic evidence indicates that two other dung beetles in the Geotrupidae family also consume acorns: Thorectes baraudi, a close relative of T. lusitanicus, and Mycotrupes lethroides, a very distant relative of T. lusitanicus. Since the three species are not all closely related yet all are apterous, this may provide evidence that apterism can lead to shifts in diet.

=== Olfaction ===
Insects heavily rely on their olfactory sense to detect and locate food. Laboratory experiments with Thorectes lusitanicus indicate that this species utilizes antennae chemoreceptors when searching for acorns. These experiments also revealed that this acorn selection is mediated by the volatile compound emitted by the acorns since T. lusitanicus was still capable of selecting acorns when the odor is mixed with dung odors.

== Gut microbiome ==
Researchers have identified over 220 phenotypically different colonies of bacteria within the gut of T. lusitanicus. As symbiotic relationships between the insect gut and various microbes are crucial in facilitating polyphagy in many insect groups, it is unsurprising that the gut microbiome of this polyphagous beetle species contains a rich diversity of culturable bacteria.

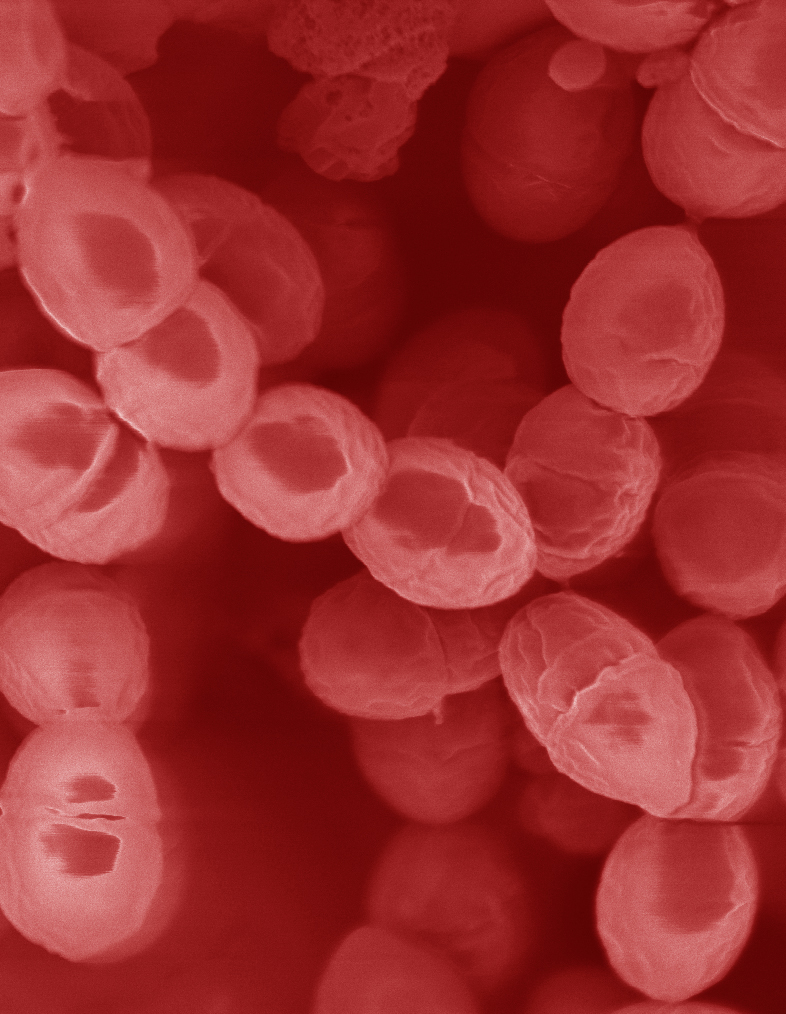
A scanning electron micrograph of a species of Lactobacillus (Lactococcus lactis) found in the gut microbiome of T. thorectes.

Enterobacterales, which have been found in the gut of T. lusitanicus, ensure amino acid synthesis by fixing nitrogen during the reproductive and diapause periods of adults and thus facilitate the acorn consumption of T. lusitanicus. Furthermore, this diazotrophic community may also detoxify the phenolic compounds within the acorns, which again permit their consumption by T. lusitanicus. Actinobacteria, which are considered defensive symbionts in insects as they produce products with antibiotic properties, have also been found within the gut of T. lusitanicus.Studies on desert locusts have shown that gut microbiome diversity is positively correlated with resistance to pathogenic bacteria invasion, leading researchers to suggest that individual T. lusitanicus who consume acorns may have higher survival rates than those who consume only dung. Firmicutes genera, including Bacillus and Lactobacillus, have also been found in the gut of T. lusitanicus. Researchers hypothesize that these genera may also be related to the polyphagy of this species.

== Threats ==
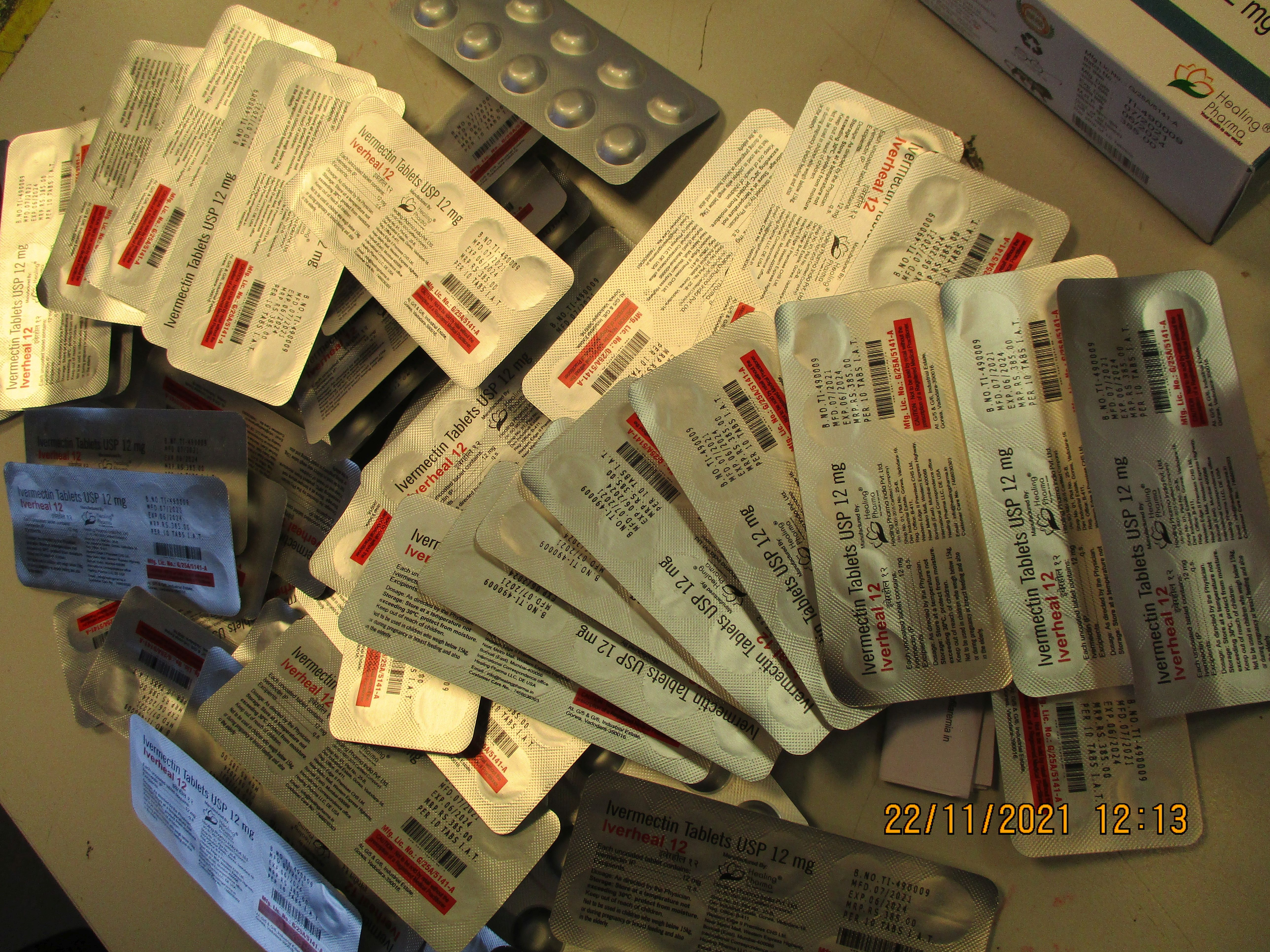
Ivermectin Tablets

A common livestock veterinary medicine, Ivermectin, poses a serious threat to Thorectes lusitanicus. Laboratory studies have indicated that when adult T. lusitanicus is exposed to non-lethal doses of ivermectin, it is biomagnified leading to acute toxicity within the beetles. When T. lusitanicus consumes dung containing ivermectin, it can alter the ovaries' morphology and decrease beetle fecundity. Even at low doses, ivermectin has been observed to have serious effects on T. lusitanicus sensorial and locomotor capacities.
