= Bamboo charcoal =

Charcoal made from bamboo

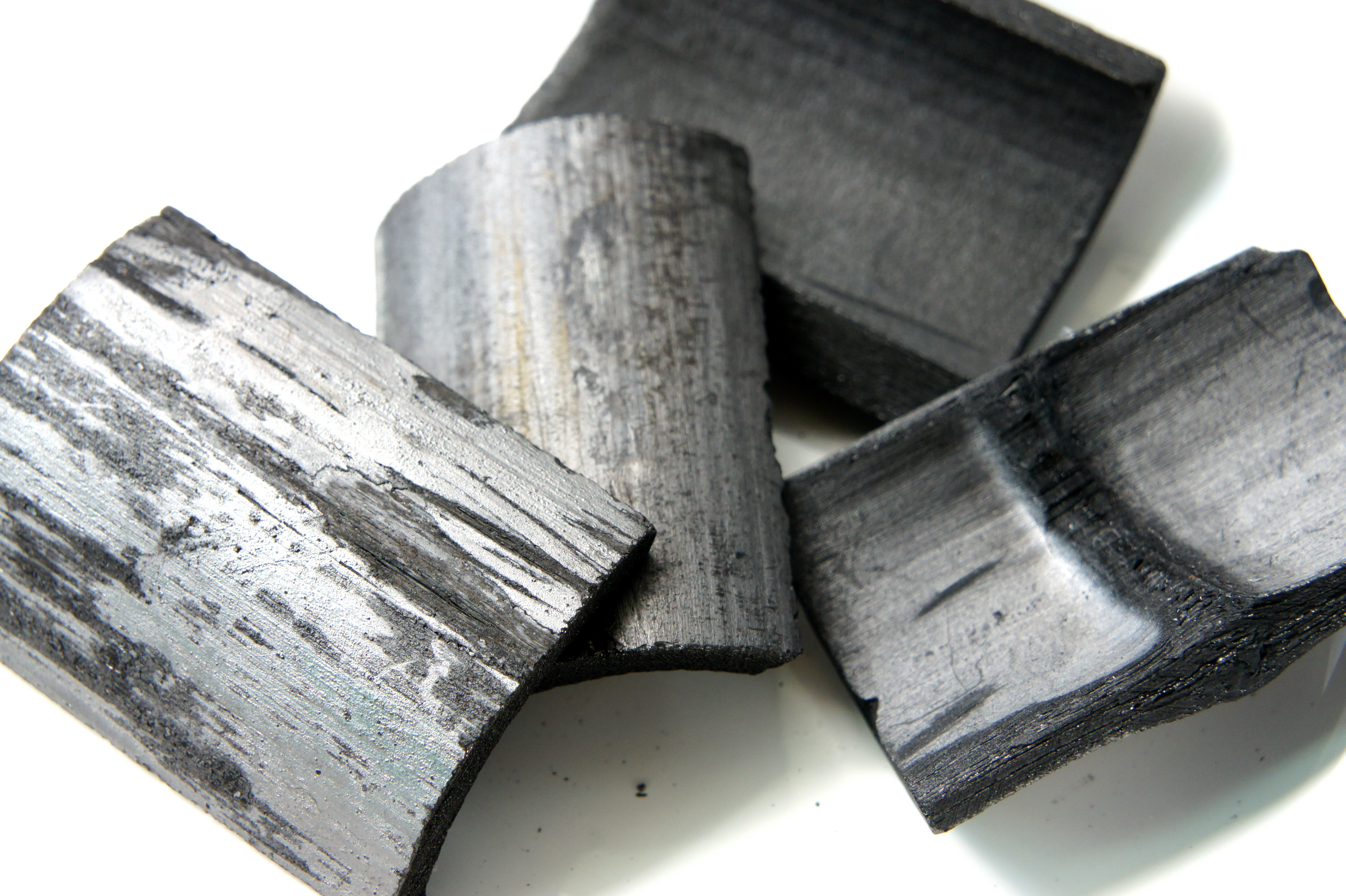
Bamboo charcoal

Bamboo charcoal is charcoal made from species of bamboo. It is typically made from the culms or refuse of mature bamboo plants and burned in ovens at temperatures ranging from 600 to 1,200 °C (1,100 to 2,200 °F). It is an especially porous charcoal, making it useful in the manufacture of activated carbon.

Bamboo charcoal has a long history of use in China, with documents dating as early as 1486 during the Ming dynasty in Chuzhou. There is also mention of it during the Qing dynasty, during the reigns of emperors Kangxi, Qianlong, and Guangxu.

== Production ==
Bamboo charcoal is made of bamboo by means of a pyrolysis process. According to the types of raw material, bamboo charcoal can be classified as raw bamboo charcoal or bamboo briquette charcoal. Raw bamboo charcoal is made of bamboo plant parts such as culms, branches, and roots. Bamboo briquette charcoal is made by carbonizing bamboo residue, such as bamboo dust or saw powder, and compressing it into sticks or lumps. There are two equipment processes used in carbonization, one is a brick kiln process, and the other is a mechanical process.

== Uses ==
In East Asia and Africa, many people use bamboo charcoal as a cooking fuel, producing less air pollution than other charcoal. Like all charcoal, bamboo charcoal purifies water by reducing organic impurities, odorants, and chlorine.

Thomas Edison and his team developed a carbonized bamboo filament which would be used in the first commercially available light bulb. These typically lasted over 1200 hours before burning out. Later on, Tungsram would develop tungsten based filaments which burned brighter and lasted longer and would go on to replace bamboo charcoal as a material in light bulb filaments.

Wood vinegar (called pyroligneous acid) is a byproduct of pyrolysis with applications in cosmetics, insecticides, deodorants, food processing, and agriculture.

Preliminary research indicates a potential benefit to plant growth.

== Health hazards ==
Occupational exposure to bamboo charcoal dust, like any charcoal dust, can result in irritation of the respiratory tract, leading to cough, increased production of phlegm, and shortness of breath. When burned, bamboo charcoal is known to release polycyclic aromatic hydrocarbons (PAH) which are known carcinogens. These may be inhaled when burned or consumed when used cooking methods such as grilling.

Consumption of bamboo charcoal can cause adverse effects. Given its ability to absorb compounds, medications may be absorbed by bamboo charcoal if ingested.

== Popular culture ==
Burger King is using bamboo charcoal as an ingredient in its Kuro Burgers (meaning "black burger") in Japan called the Kuro Pearl and Kuro Ninja burgers.

== Use in alternative medicine ==
Bamboo charcoal is used in sects of alternative medicine such as traditional Chinese medicine. Proponents claim that bamboo charcoal can be used for teeth whitening, skin cleansing, anti-aging, lowering cholesterol, improving digestion, and curing hangovers. While activated carbon, which may be manufactured from bamboo charcoal, is used in medicine to absorb ingested poisons, there is little or no evidence to back up any of these claims.

Wood vinegar from bamboo is also used in alternative medicine, with claims that it can be used for wound care, insect and snake bites, lowering cholesterol, and "detoxification". There is currently no evidence that wood vinegar is useful in any medical treatment. Wood vinegar is the main ingredient in detoxification foot pads which claim to remove toxins from the body when placed on the foot overnight. Independent tests have shown these pads to be completely ineffective. The dark color of the pads following overnight exposure was found to be the result of sweat reacting with the wood vinegar and was not due to any absorbed "toxins".
