= Detoxification foot baths =

Pseudoscientific alternative medicine

- Foot detox, ionic cleansing, ionic foot bath and aqua/water detox
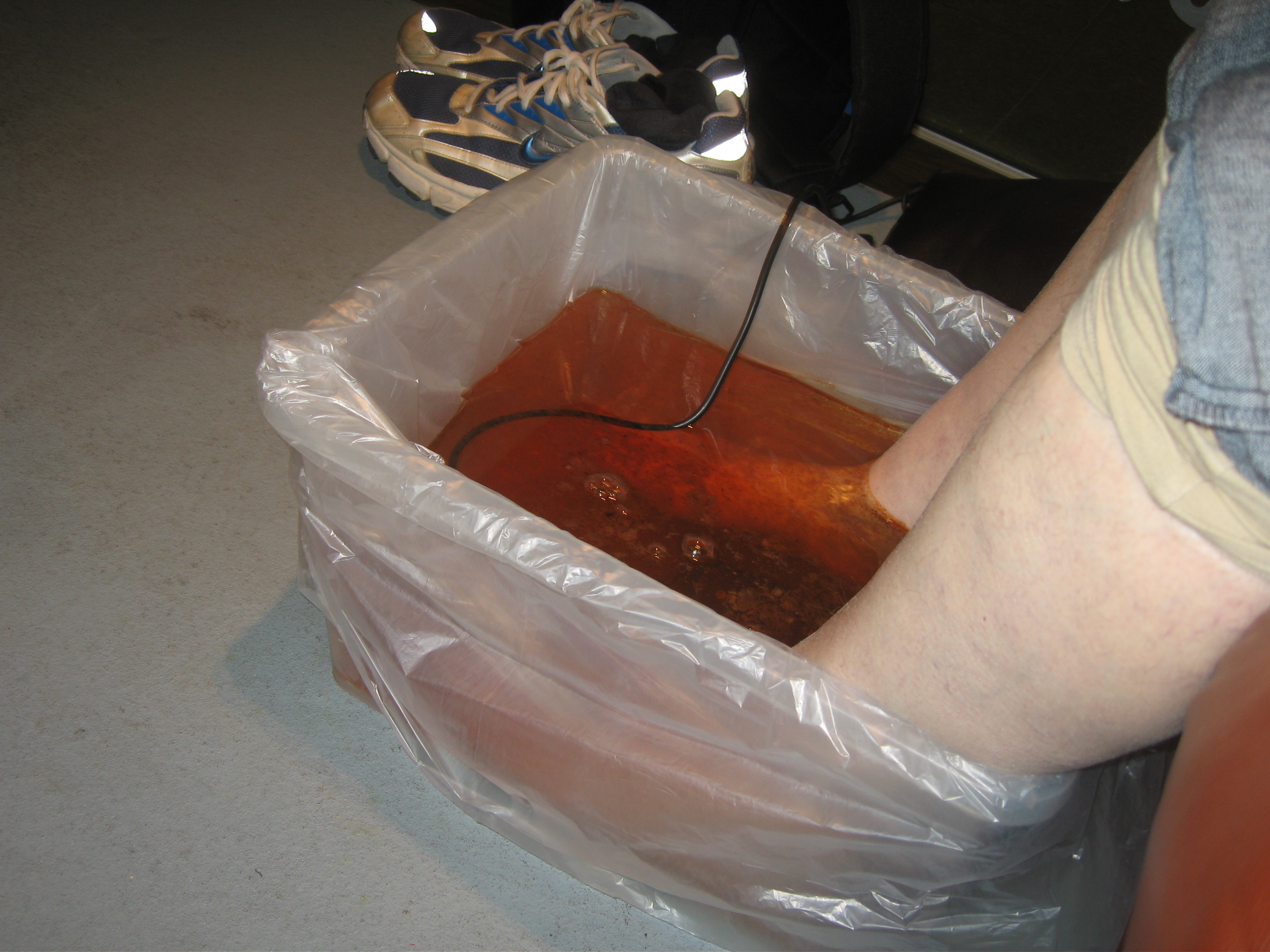
- A person receiving a detox foot bath treatment

Alternative therapy

Detoxification foot baths, also known as foot detox, ionic cleansing, ionic foot bath and aqua/water detox are pseudoscientific alternative medical devices marketed as being able to remove toxins from the human body. They work by providing an electric current to an electrode array immersed in a salt water solution. When switched on, the electrodes rapidly rust in a chemical process called electrolysis which quickly turns the water brown. This reaction happens regardless of whether or not a person's feet are immersed in the water, and no toxins from the human body have ever been detected in the water after use.

== Description ==
Detoxification foot baths first became popular with consumers in the early 2000s and quickly became popular in spas due to the theatre of the visible brown water and sludge produced by the devices. One manufacturer of the device, known as Aqua Detox, states that the concept is based on research from the 1920s to 1930s by Royal Rife, an inventor who claimed his Rife Devices could "devitalize disease organisms" by vibrating them at certain frequencies.

Detoxification foot baths consist of two major components, a simple container in which to place the feet and an electrode array. Usually a fragrant, warm salted water is used as the electrolyte and the customer's feet, along with the array, are immersed in this water. Inside the array are two metal electrodes, between which a current flows, causing the electrodes to rust rapidly due to electrolysis. This reaction quickly turns the salt water solution brown, and flakes of rust may also be visible in the water. Electrode arrays used in this application degrade quickly, and usually need to be replaced after roughly 16 hours of use.

== Claims ==
Proponents of detoxification foot baths claim they are capable of helping the human body in numerous ways. Effects like "re-balancing the cellular energy" of the body, helping with headaches and sleeplessness, to kidney, liver, and immune system function are regularly stated. More serious claims such as helping with heavy metal toxicity and autism spectrum disorder have been made by various proponents.

Some spas and manufacturers provide charts to show their customers the different areas of their bodies from which toxins originate. In these charts, the color of the water in the foot bath, after treatment, purportedly defines the source of toxins in the body.

Water color and consistency	Associated area of the body from which "toxins" originated
White foam	The lymphatic system
Yellow	The kidneys, bladder, urinary tract or prostate area
Orange	The joints
Dark green	The gall bladder
Red with flecks	Blood clot material
Black	The liver
Brown	The liver, cellular debris, and tobacco
Black with flecks	Heavy metals

There is no scientific basis to the claims of these charts.

== Criticism ==
Inside Edition visited several spas in New York City in 2011 to investigate detox foot treatments. At each spa they visited, they were told that the treatments would improve their overall health, and that the change in the color of the water was due to the release of toxins from their bodies. Inside Edition then purchased a detox foot bath and had it examined by electrical engineer Steve Fowler, at his lab. After examining the device, he concluded that "Everything you see here is just rust, this is nothing more than two pieces of metal rusting, it has nothing to do with toxins. It is just a simple chemistry experiment."

In his 2008 book Bad Science, Ben Goldacre discussed his experiences investigating the science behind detox foot baths. After reading an article in The Daily Telegraph about them, he suspected the brown water could be rust. He then set up his experiment using a bucket of water, a car battery, and two large nails. His experiment quickly changed the color of the water in the bucket to a dark brown with a sludge on top.

With this information in mind, he sent a friend to a local spa to get a treatment and to collect water samples before and after. The samples were sent to the Medical Toxicology Unit at St Mary's Hospital in London to be analyzed. The water sampled before the detox foot bath was activated, contained only 0.54mg per liter of iron, and after the treatment was complete, it contained 23.6mg per liter. For reference, Goldacre's water sample from his original experiment contained 97mg per liter.

Goldacre approached several manufacturers of the devices regarding their claims about removing toxins from the body. None of them could explain which toxins were being removed from the body or if any were at all. With that information, he decided to have his water samples tested for creatinine and urea, two of the smallest breakdown molecules that the human body creates. Neither of these molecules was found in the samples, just the iron oxide rust.

Joe Schwarcz also explained that putting the iron and aluminum electrodes in water will produce iron oxide, showing as various shades of brownish residue. The magnesium and calcium naturally present in human sweat increase the electrolytic reaction. After trying the apparatus and getting the brown residue even when the bath is running without the presence of human feet, Timothy Caulfield concluded that "this is a really good example of what's ultimately nothing but a marketing scam."

== See also ==
- Activated charcoal cleanse
- Alternative medicine
- Antiscience
- Detoxification
- Detoxification (alternative medicine)
- Detoxification foot pads
- Ionized jewelry
- Junk science
- Kambo
- List of topics characterized as pseudoscience
- Magnet therapy
- Placebo
- Pseudoscience
- Quackery
- Radionics
- Skeptical movement
- Skepticism
