= Activated charcoal cleanse =

Pseudoscientific use of medicine

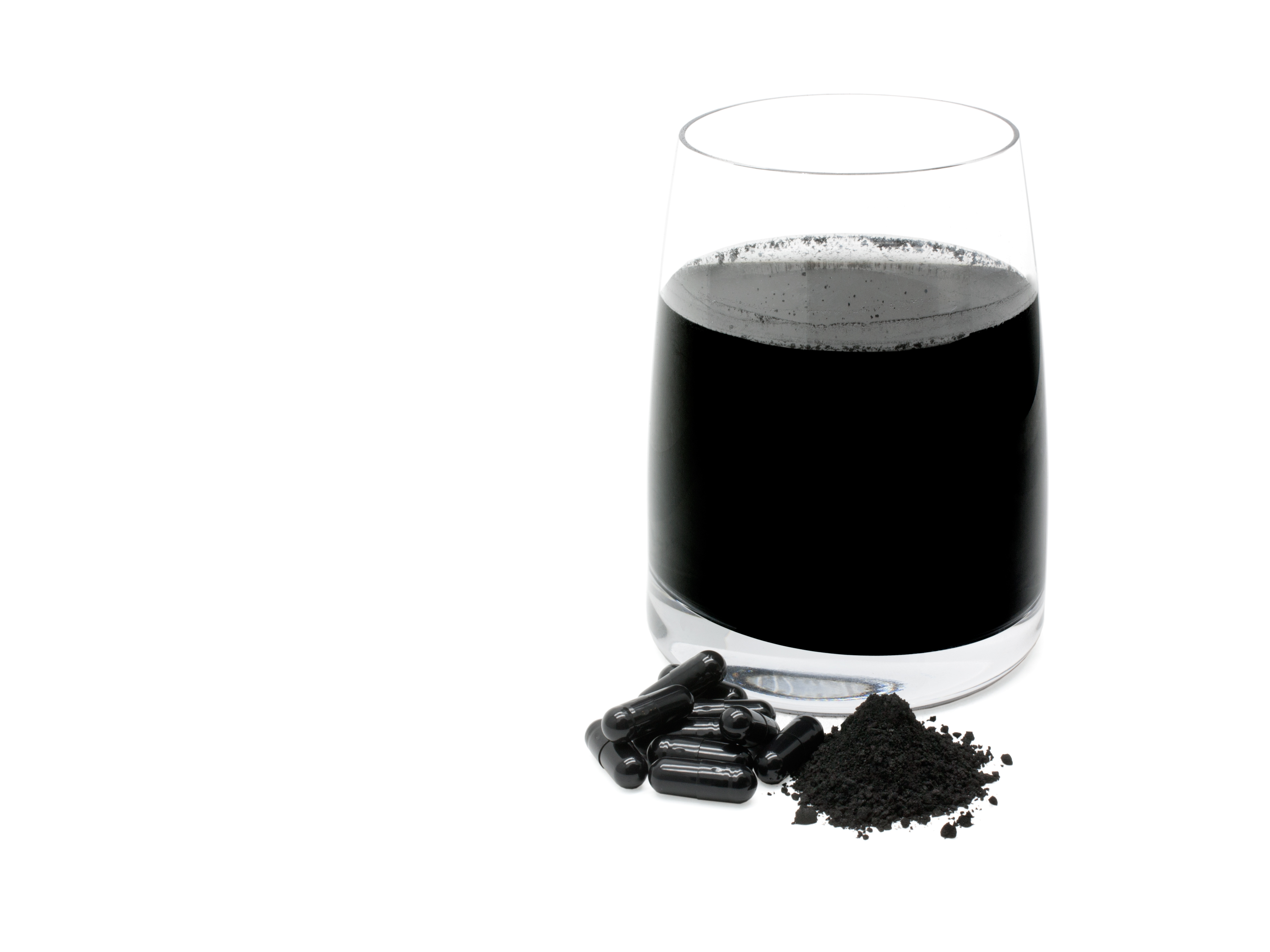
- Activated charcoal shown in various forms

Alternative therapy
- Claims: Detoxification or cleansing of the body

Activated charcoal cleanses, also known as charcoal detoxes, are a pseudoscientific use of a proven medical intervention for poisoning, activated charcoal. Activated charcoal is available in powder, tablet, and liquid form. Its proponents claim the use of activated charcoal regularly will detoxify and cleanse the body as well as boost one's energy and brighten the skin. Such claims violate basic principles of chemistry and physiology. There is no medical evidence for any health benefits of cleanses or detoxes via activated charcoal or any other method. Charcoal, when ingested, will absorb vitamins and nutrients as well as prescription medications present in the gastrointestinal tract which can make it dangerous to use unless directed by a medical doctor.

== Background ==
=== Production and industrial applications ===
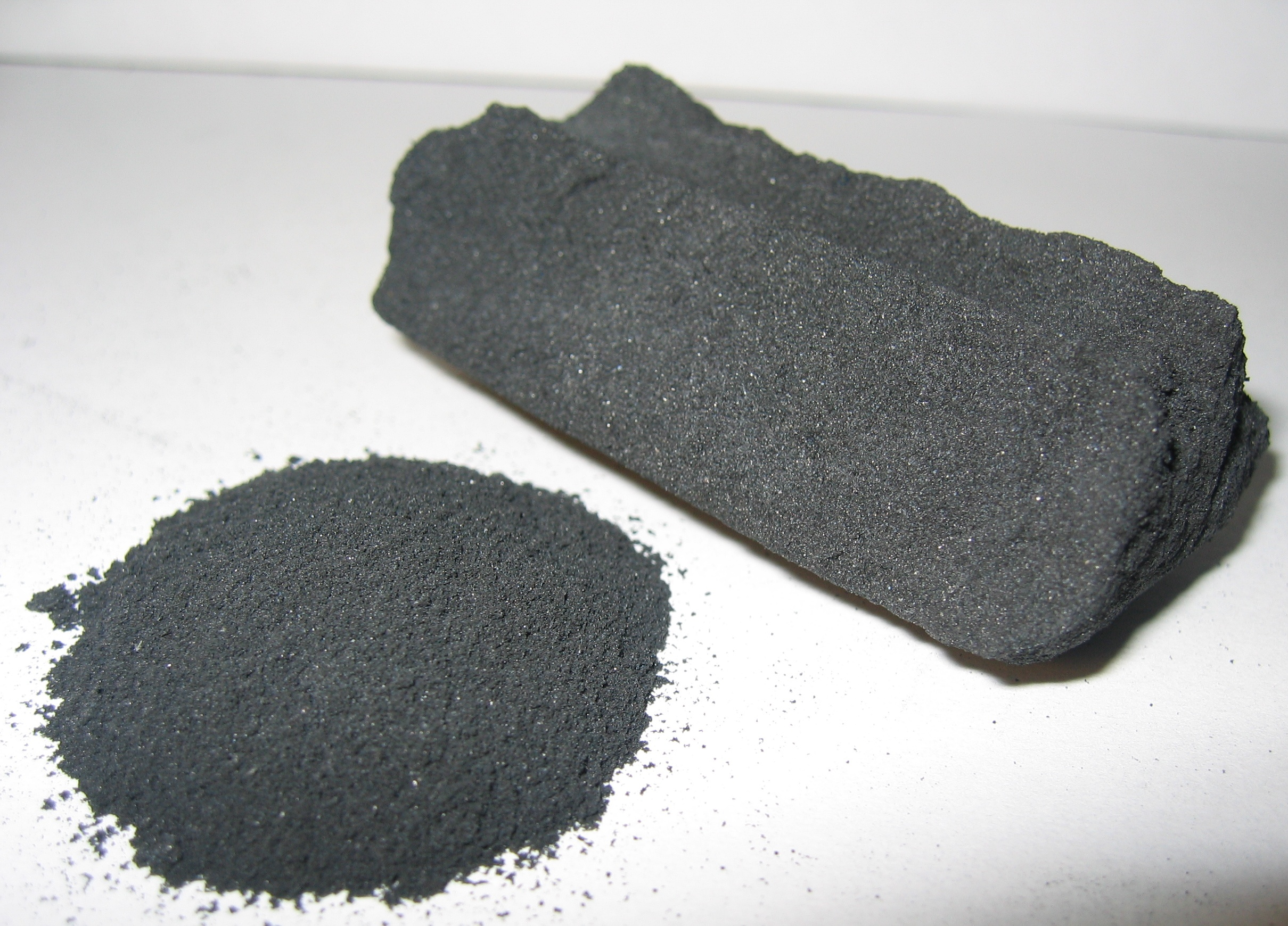
Activated carbon

Activated charcoal, also known as activated carbon, is commonly produced from high-carbon source materials such as wood or coconut husk. It is made by treating the source material with either a combination of heat and pressure, or with a strong acid or base followed by carbonization to make it highly porous. This gives it a very large surface area for its volume, up to 3000 square metres per gram. It has a large number of industrial uses including methane and hydrogen storage, air purification, decaffeination, gold purification, metal extraction, water purification, medicine, sewage treatment and air filters in gas masks and respirators.

=== Medical use ===
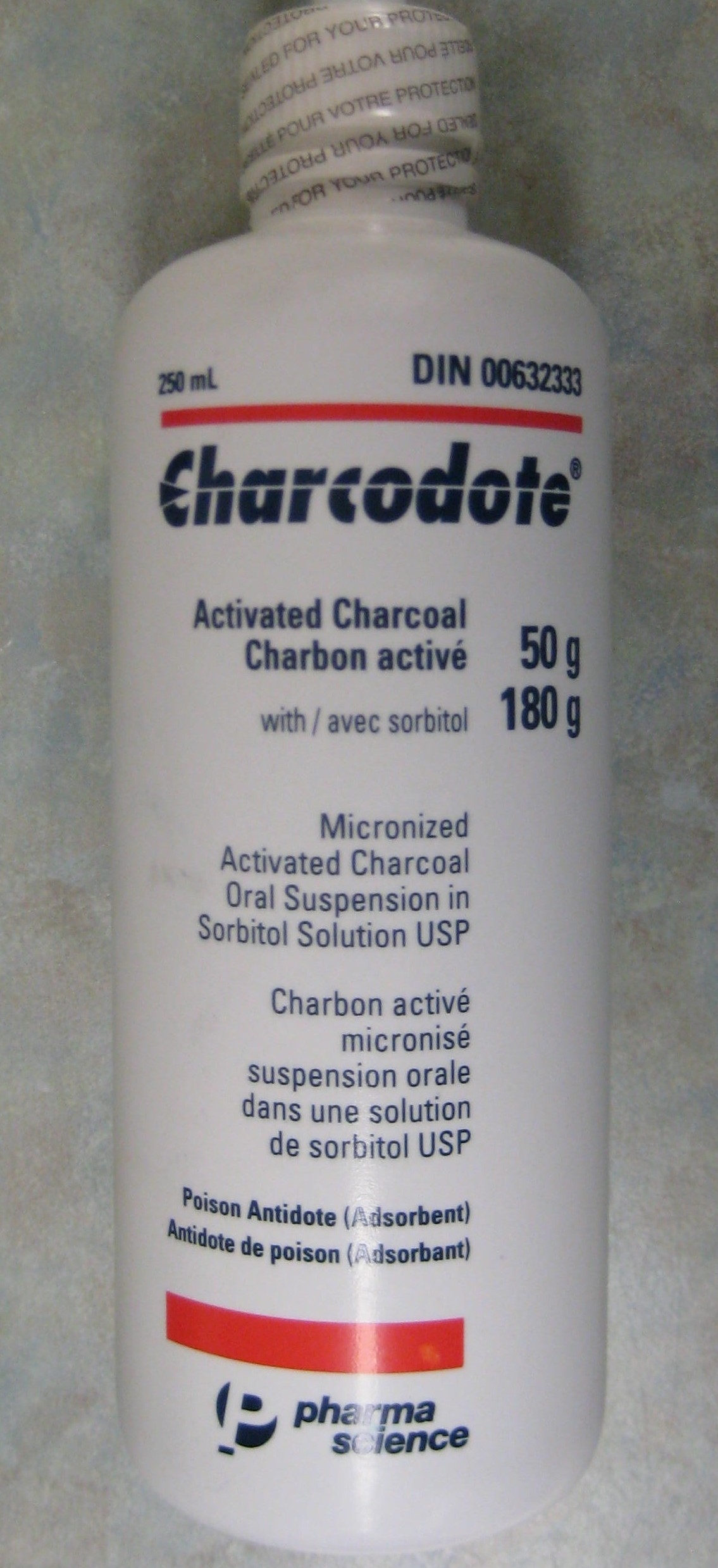
Activated charcoal for medical use

Activated charcoal is used to detoxify people, but only in life-threatening medical emergencies such as overdoses or poisonings. As it is indigestible it will only work on poisons or medications still present in the stomach and intestines. Once these have been absorbed by the body the charcoal will no longer be able to adsorb them so early intervention is desirable. Charcoal is not an effective treatment for alcohol, metals or elemental poisons such as lithium or arsenic as it will only adsorb certain chemicals and molecules. It is usually administered by a nasogastric tube into the stomach as the thick slurry required for maximum adsorption is very difficult to swallow.

== Use in alternative therapies ==
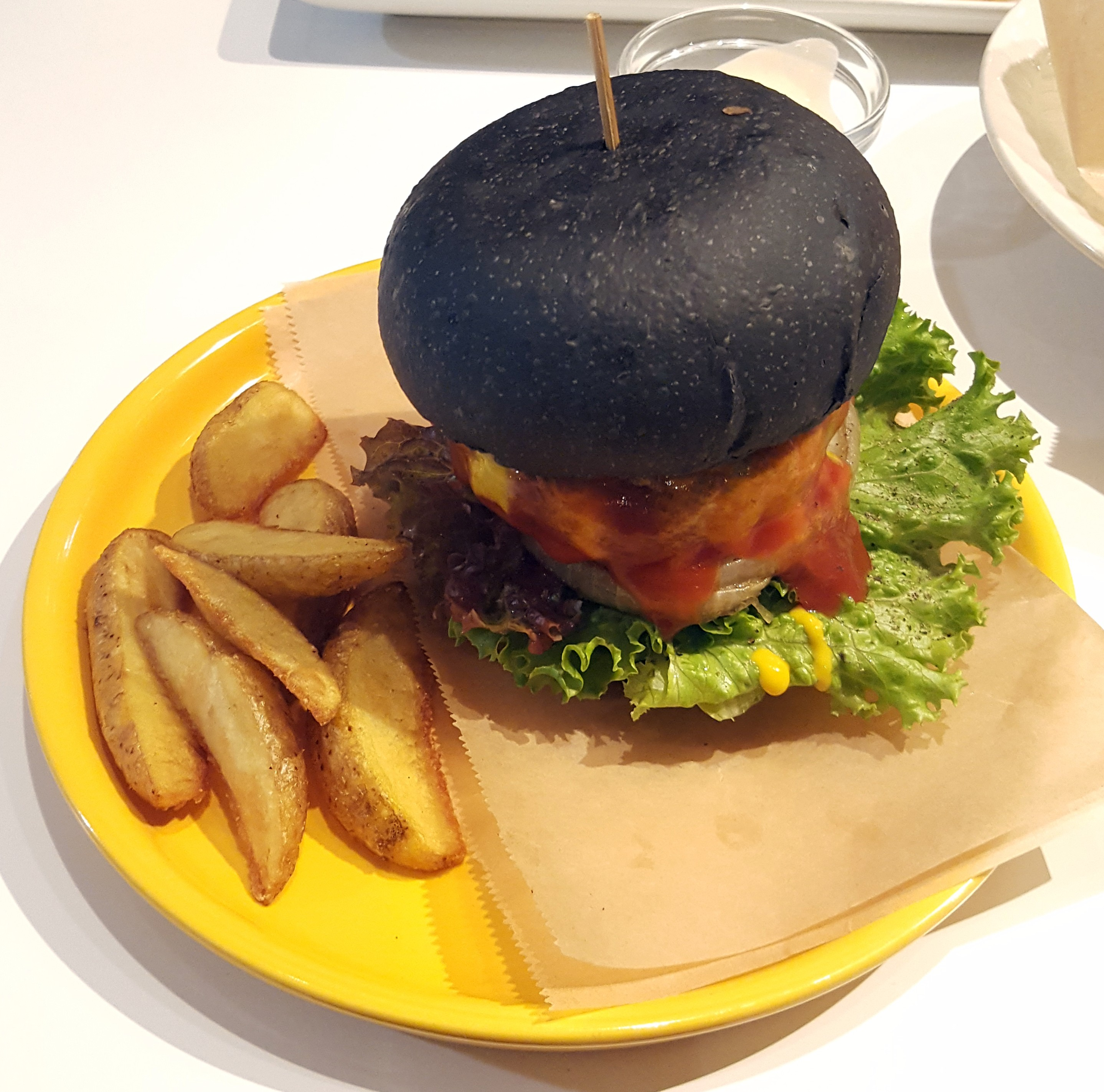
A vegan burger with a charcoal bun

Pizza made with charcoal were popular in 2016 as they gave the dough an umami flavor.

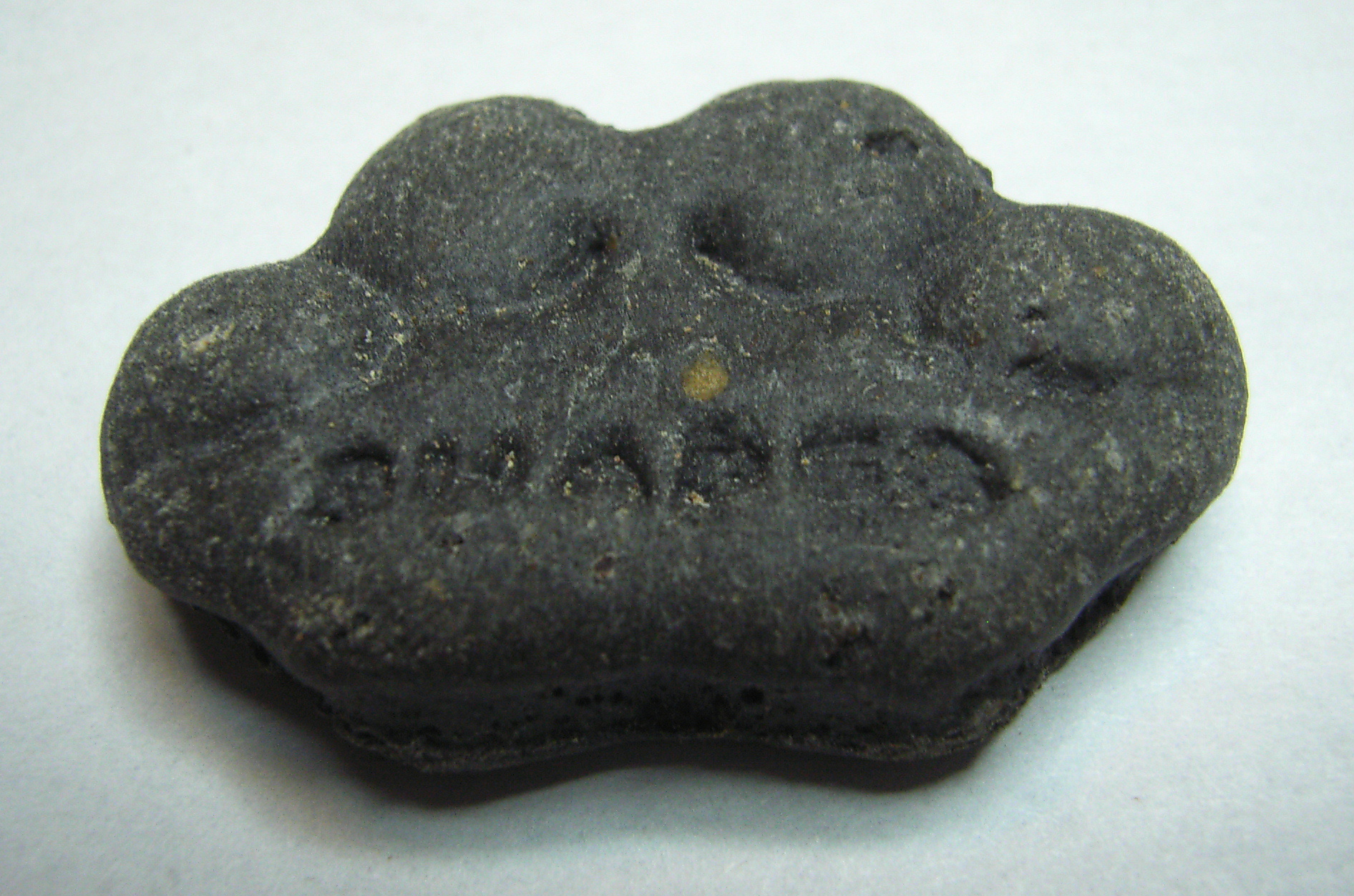
A charcoal dog biscuit

Activated charcoal, as used in cleanses or detoxes, became popular around 2014 after it was brought to mainstream attention by Gwyneth Paltrow's Goop company where it was described as "one of the best juice cleanses". In the following years, it became a popular additive to many different types of foods and drinks including juices, lemonades, coffee, pastries, ice cream, burgers, pizzas and pet food. The City of New York has banned activated charcoal in food products unless approval for their use is granted from the FDA. Activated charcoal, excluding products designed for emergency medical interventions, is available in many pharmacies, wellness and health food stores in tablet, capsule and powder forms.

=== Claims ===
Proponents of charcoal detoxes claim that it will cleanse the body by aiding in the removal of excess toxins that the body is unable to get rid of by itself. Other claims made include that the use of activated charcoal provides anti-ageing benefits, will increase energy, brighten skin, decrease flatulence and bloating, and aid weight loss. It is also said to be an ideal product in skincare products for improving acne and scarring.

=== Criticism ===
Scott Gavura of Science Based Medicine was highly critical of the use of activated charcoal in the wellness industry. In his 2015 article "Activated charcoal: The latest detox fad in an obsessive food culture", he said:

Fake detox, the kind you find in magazines, and sold in pharmacies, juice bars, and health food stores, is make-believe medicine. The use of the term 'toxin' in this context is meaningless. There are no toxins named, because there's no evidence that these treatments do anything at all, but it sounds just scientific enough to be plausible.

Sophie Medlin, a lecturer in nutrition and dietetics at King's College in London suggests avoiding the use of activated charcoal cleanses for several reasons:

- It will bind with nutrients in food present in the stomach and intestines, making the food less nutritious.
- It will bind with some medications, making it dangerous to use if medications have recently been used.
- Charcoal will only adsorb particles present in the gastrointestinal tract when it is taken. If taken to cure a hangover from consuming alcohol the night before, it will not work.
- Activated charcoal will slow down the bowel and can cause nausea, constipation and dehydration.

Jay Rayner of The Guardian contacted a manufacturer of activated charcoal lemonade to ask about its detoxifying properties. He was told that they make no claims at all about the product. When he then asked how the product detoxes the body, he was told that he was confusing the term "detox" with the medical term "detoxification".

Carrie Dennett of The Seattle Times said of activated charcoal:

unless you have a rare health condition that renders your liver—or its supporting players: your kidneys, digestive system, lungs and lymphatic system—unable to perform as designed, then your body doesn't need help. Unless you have overdosed or been poisoned, there's no substantial evidence that activated charcoal will benefit you.

Charcoal is also used as an alternative to whitening products in toothpastes, but was found to not be as effective in whitening the teeth as regular products such as hydrogen peroxide.

== See also ==
- Charcoal in food
- Colon cleansing
- Oil pulling
- Placebo
