= Activated charcoal (medication) =

Medication used to treat ingested poisonings

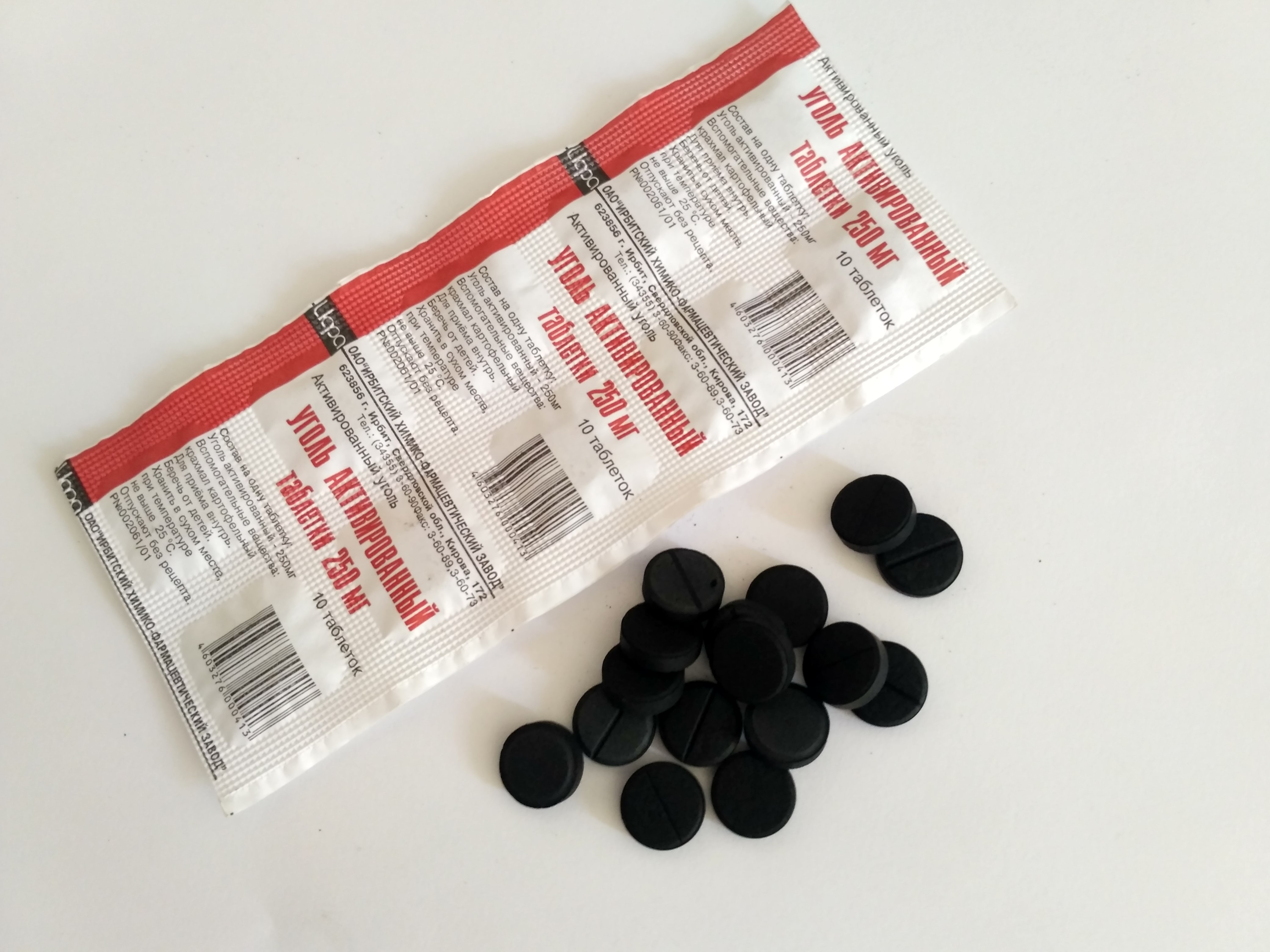
- Activated charcoal for medical use

Clinical data
- Trade names: CharcoAid, others
- AHFS/Drugs.com: Monograph
- Routes of administration: by mouth, nasogastric tube

Identifiers
- CAS Number: 7440-44-0
- ChemSpider: none
- UNII: 2P3VWU3H10
- CompTox Dashboard (EPA): DTXSID9027651
- ECHA InfoCard: 100.036.697

Activated charcoal, also known as activated carbon, is a medication used to treat poisonings that occurred by mouth. To be effective it must be used within a short time of the poisoning occurring, typically an hour. It does not work for poisonings by cyanide, corrosive agents, iron, lithium, alcohols, or malathion. It may be taken by mouth or given by a nasogastric tube. Other uses include inside hemoperfusion machines.

Common side effects include vomiting, black stools, diarrhea, and constipation. A more serious side effect, pneumonitis, may result if aspirated into the lungs. Gastrointestinal obstruction and ileus are less common but serious adverse effects. Use in pregnancy and breastfeeding is generally safe. Activated charcoal works by adsorbing the toxin.

While charcoal has been used since ancient times for poisonings, activated charcoal has been used since the 1900s. It is on the World Health Organization's List of Essential Medicines.

== Medical uses ==
=== Poison ingestion ===
Activated charcoal is used to treat many types of oral poisonings such as phenobarbital and carbamazepine. It is not effective for a number of poisonings including: strong acids or bases, iron, lithium, arsenic, methanol, ethanol or ethylene glycol.

Although activated charcoal is the most commonly used agent for GI decontamination in poisoned patients, medical professionals use discretion when determining whether or not its use is indicated. In a study of acute poisonings from agricultural pesticides and yellow oleander seeds, the administration of activated carbon did not affect survival rates.

=== Gastrointestinal tract-related issues ===
Charcoal biscuits were sold in England starting in the early 19th century, originally as remedy to flatulence and stomach trouble.

Tablets or capsules of activated carbon are used in many countries as an over-the-counter drug to treat diarrhea, indigestion, and flatulence. There is some evidence of its effectiveness to prevent diarrhea in cancer patients who have received irinotecan. It can interfere with the absorption of some medications, and lead to unreliable readings in medical tests such as the guaiac card test. Activated carbon is also used for bowel preparation by reducing intestinal gas content before abdominal radiography to visualize bile and pancreatic and renal stones. A type of charcoal biscuit has also been marketed as a pet care product.

=== Dentistry - Removal of amalgam fillings ===
Dentists who remove amalgam fillings using the Safe Mercury Amalgam Removal Technique (SMART) technique give the patient "a slurry of charcoal, chlorella, or similar adsorbent to rinse and swallow before the procedure (unless the patient declines or there are other contraindications making this clinically inappropriate)".

=== Other ===
Claims that activated charcoal will do things such as whiten teeth, cure alcohol-induced hangovers, and prevent bloating, are not supported by evidence. Activated charcoal cleanses also lack evidence and are considered pseudoscience.

== Side effects ==
Incorrect application (e.g. into the lungs) results in pulmonary aspiration which can sometimes be fatal if immediate medical treatment is not initiated. The use of activated carbon is contraindicated when the ingested substance is an acid, an alkali, or a petroleum product.

== Mechanism of action ==
Activated charcoal is biologically inert. When in the presence of some poisons, activated charcoal adsorbs the chemical onto its surface, rendering it unable to interact with the body. This is possible due to its high surface area compared to its volume.

== History ==
The use of charcoal as a medicinal product can be traced back to Egypt in 1500 BC, where it was used to neutralise bad odours from wounds. By 400 BC, the Phoenicians used charcoal to improve the taste of water stored on ships by containing the water in charred barrels, indicating that an understanding of charcoal's ability to adsorb undesirable chemicals was present by this time. Activated charcoal in its current form was developed during the 18th century, first being used during the sugar refining process to remove coloured impurities from raw sugar. Medical use of activated charcoal commenced in the early 19th century; an often-cited experiment demonstrating its properties was carried out in 1835, where a dosage of strychnine mixed with activated charcoal resulted in no symptoms of poisoning being observed.
