= Charcoal in food =

Charcoal as a food ingredient

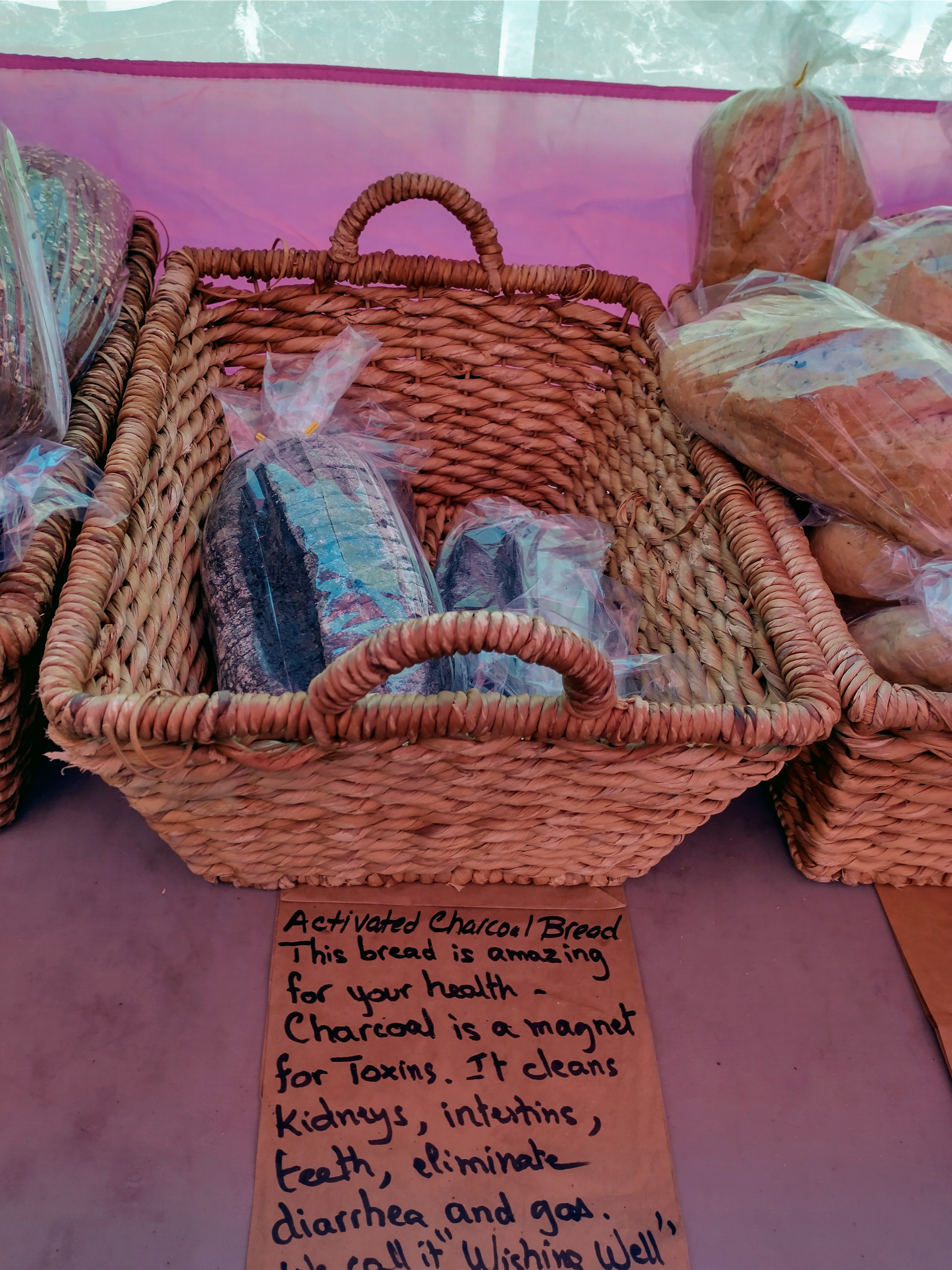
Activated charcoal bread for sale in a farmer's market

Pizzas made with charcoal were popular in 2016, as they gave the dough an umami flavour. Waitrose then produced and sold such pizzas with a contrasting sweet and salty topping.

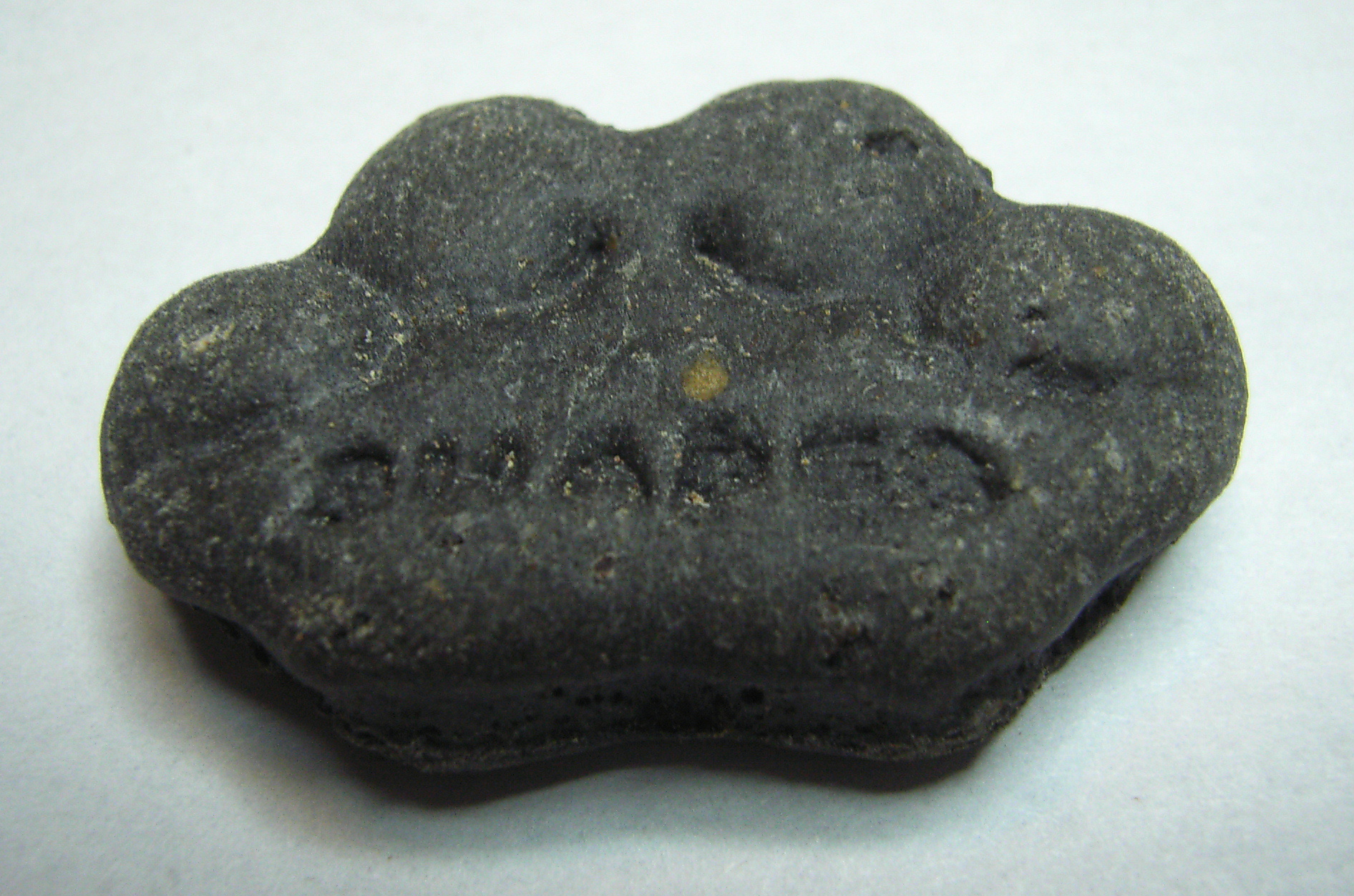
A charcoal dog biscuit

Charcoal is used in food to color it black and for its supposed health benefits.

Activated charcoal, typically made from bamboo or coconut shell, is used as a food ingredient. It gives food an earthy, smoky taste and the black coloring gives the food an exotic, fashionable appearance.

Some health benefits have been claimed for charcoal back to classical times, when Hippocrates and Pliny recommended it for conditions such as anthrax and vertigo. Activated charcoal adsorbs chemicals and so may bind to both toxins and vital nutrients such as vitamins; its effects are broad and indiscriminate. Therefore it may also make prescription medications less effective.

Chefs and food retailers that have pioneered the use of charcoal in food include Ferran Adrià, Burger King, René Redzepi, Simon Rogan and Waitrose.

Activated charcoal is the primary ingredient in black ice cream, which is often served with a black cone also containing charcoal. The ice cream usually contains other flavorings such as horchata, almond, and coconut in order to mask the taste of the charcoal.

== Safety and risk ==
Activated charcoal can aid certain toxins from the digestive system through a process called adsorption. This occurs because activated charcoal possesses a highly porous structure, dramatically increasing its surface area. The pores in activated charcoal can trap chemicals and other substances when it is in the stomach. This interrupts the drug or chemicals from absorbing into the bloodstream to prevent it from traveling to organs and tissues and causing damage or worse.

People using medical treatment, such as birth control pills and medication for depression, should avoid novelty meals or beverages with activated charcoal coloring, as they can render the drug ineffective.

== Clarification ==
Charcoal and Activated charcoal vary significantly in terms of composition, manufacturing process, applications, and effectiveness.

Charcoal mostly consists of carbon, ash, water, and gasses. Activated charcoal, on the other hand, is primarily carbon but gets an extra activation process. It results in a higher surface area and porous structure. This structure makes it efficient to trap pollutants and poisons.

The production process for normal charcoal involves heating wood in a limited oxygen environment. Activated charcoal is made by heating charcoal in a hot tank without oxygen. It is then exposed to argon and nitrogen and reheated. During the second heating, the charcoal is exposed to oxygen and steam. The pores created in this process are what give it its medicinal use.

== History ==
=== Ancient times ===
Charcoal has been used as a cooking fuel since Ancient times. The Egyptians, Greeks, and Romans all used charcoal for various reasons, including smelting, blacksmithing, and, of course, cooking. It is impossible to overstate the importance of charcoal in the evolution of early cooking processes. It was the preferred fuel for open-fire cooking. It is still enjoyed by barbecue aficionados today.

=== Industrial Revolution ===
During the medieval and Renaissance centuries, charcoal remained a key factor in the cooking sector. Cooking skills advanced with the development of charcoal-fueled ovens and stoves. This transformed the way food was prepared. Besides its functional use, charcoal cooking had historical and social importance at the time, since it was frequently connected with community meetings and cheerful events.

The manufacturing and usage of charcoal underwent significant changes during the Industrial Revolution. The introduction of charcoal fires enabled widely used manufacturing of the fuel, meeting increasing demands. However, there was also an increase away from charcoal in favor of other fuel sources such as coal and gas. Despite the transition, charcoal has managed to keep its position across multiple industries, especially cooking.

== Culinary applications ==
Activated charcoal is commonly used as a natural food for coloring and cleaning purposes, with its efficacy in absorbing toxin properties. There are also claims of charcoal-infused food/drinks being a key to detox based on marketing and advertising rather than on scientific evidence.

Activated charcoal's deep black color undoubtedly creates a visual effect in bread. Its impact goes beyond aesthetics. This ingredient might change the bread's texture, potentially leading to a denser and less elastic texture due to its moisture absorption properties. Charcoal has an effect on shelf life, ash content, and even dough handling. Activated charcoal interferes with gluten formation and makes the dough stiffer.

Charcoal ice cream is simply ice cream with added charcoal, or a combination of charcoal and food coloring. Before creating ice cream, fine charcoal is put into the foundation which may be black. It can be combined with frozen yogurt, soft serve, gelato, or another similar frozen delicacy.

== See also ==
- Charring
