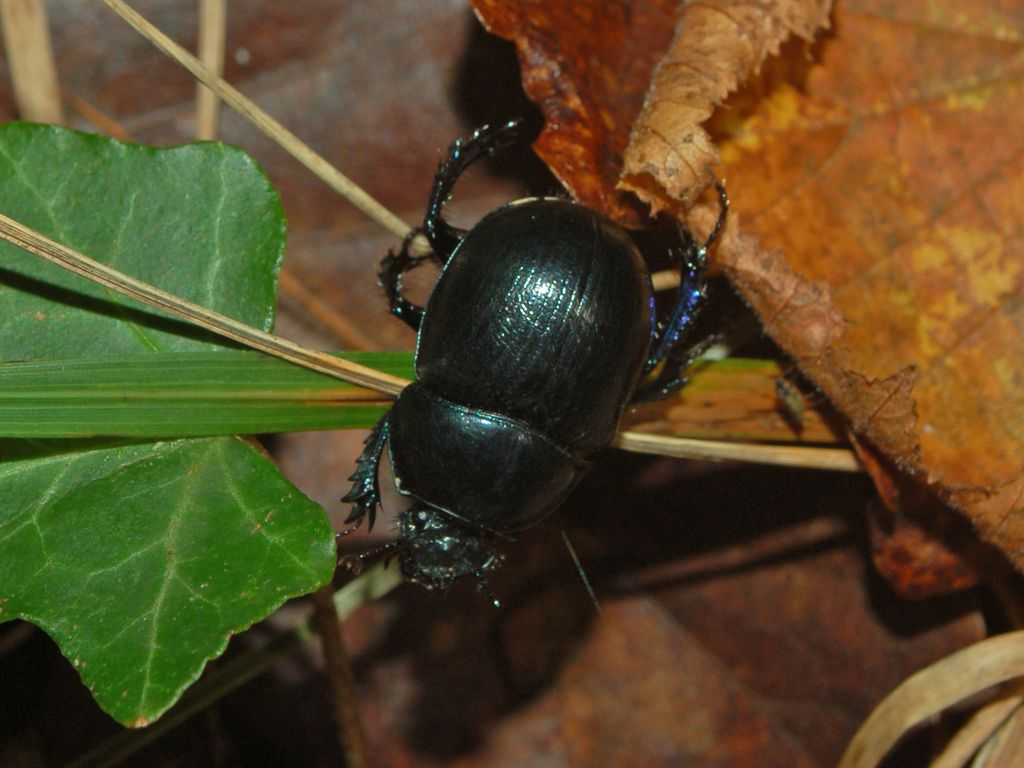
- Anoplotrupes stercorosus, upperside
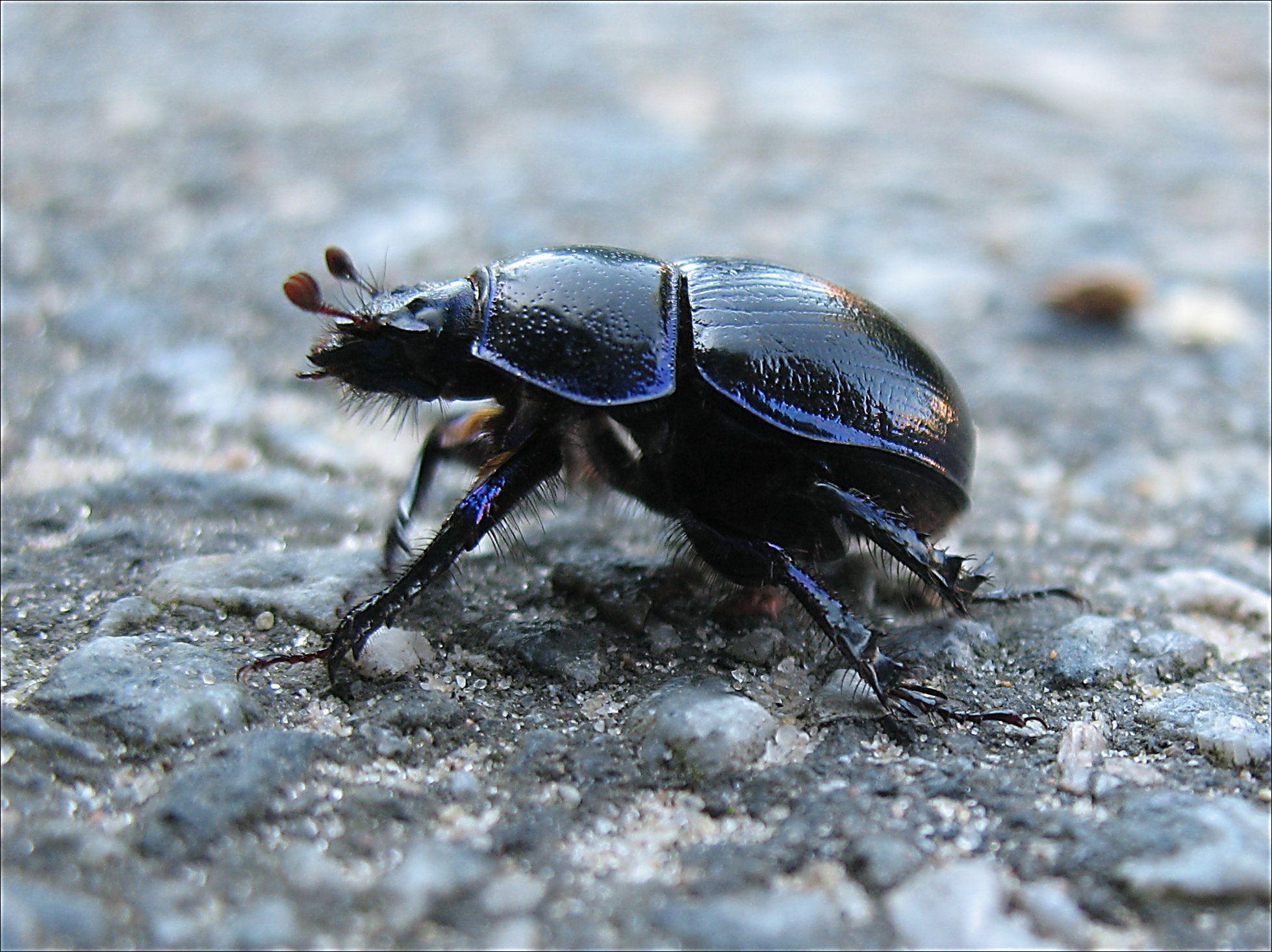
- Side view

Scientific classification
- Kingdom: Animalia
- Phylum: Arthropoda
- Clade: Pancrustacea
- Class: Insecta
- Order: Coleoptera
- Suborder: Polyphaga
- Infraorder: Scarabaeiformia
- Family: Geotrupidae
- Genus: Anoplotrupes
- Species: A. stercorosus

Binomial name
- Anoplotrupes stercorosus (Hartmann in L. G. Scriba, 1791)

Synonyms
- List: Geotrupes amoethysticus Mulsant, 1842; Geotrupes erythropterus Trella, 1937; Geotrupes fauconneti Pic, 1926; Geotrupes inaequalis Faldermann, 1835; Geotrupes juvenilis Mulsant, 1842; Geotrupes monticola Heer, 1841; Geotrupes nigrinus Mulsant, 1842; Geotrupes picipennis Fleischer, 1925; Geotrupes prusicus Czwalina, 1884; Geotrupes rugosissimus Fleischer, 1925; Geotrupes stercorosus Hartmann in L.G. Scriba, 1791; Geotrupes sylvaticus Panzer, 1798; Geotrupes violaceus Dalla Torre, 1879; Geotrupes viridis Dalla Torre, 1879; Geotrupes viturati Pic, 1926; Scarabaeus stercorosus Scriba, 1791

= Anoplotrupes stercorosus =

Species of beetle

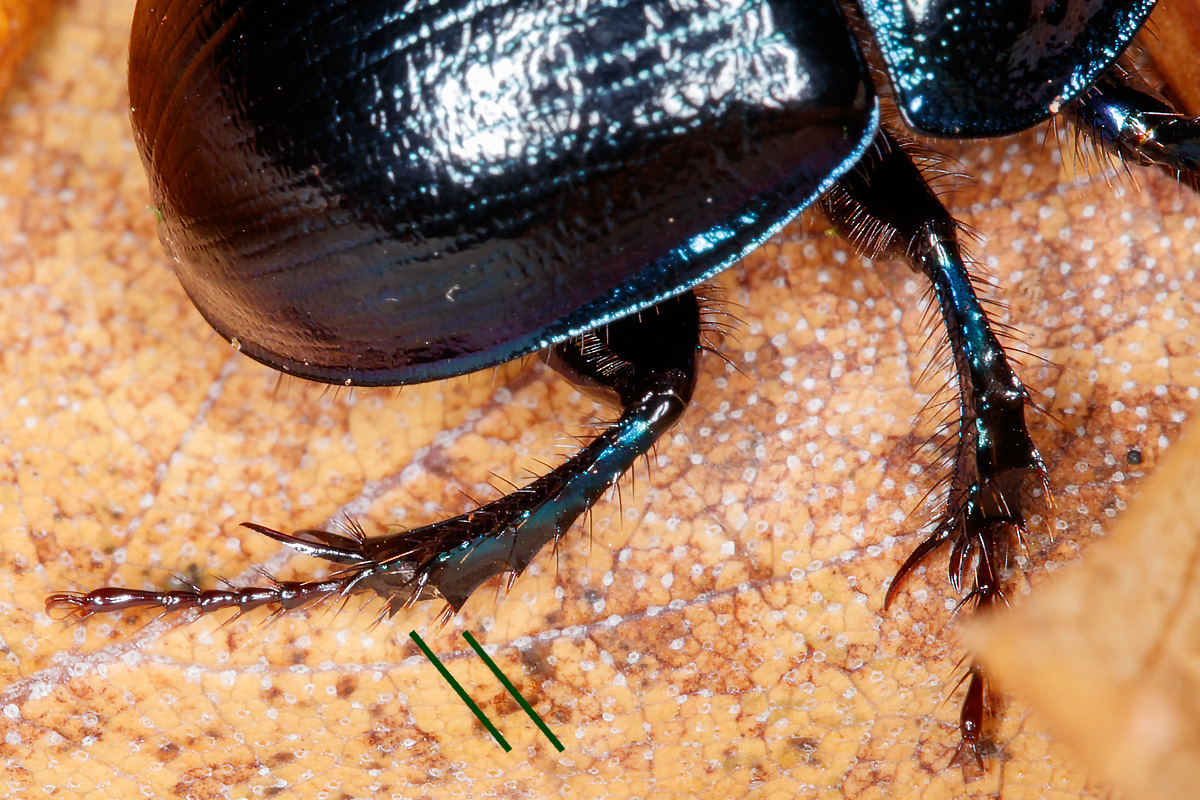
Anoplotrupes stercorosus – two keels on the outer side of the tibia of the third pair of legs

Anoplotrupes stercorosus, the dor beetle, is a species of earth-boring dung beetle belonging to the family Geotrupidae, subfamily Geotrupinae.

== Varieties ==
Varieties or forms that have been recognized at times include the following:

- A. stercorosus var. viridis (Dalla Torre, 1879)
- A. stercorosus var. amoethystinus (Mulsant, 1842)
- A. stercorosus var. nigrinus (Mulsant, 1842)
- A. stercorosus ab. juvenilis (Mulsant, 1842)

These are now regarded as synonyms of the parent taxon; the International Code of Zoological Nomenclature does not recognize named forms other than subspecies.

== Distribution ==
This beetle is present throughout most of Europe and in Asia. It is also found in other regions of the world where cattle have been introduced, such as Australia.

== Habitat ==
These beetles inhabit fresh areas of broadleaf forests, mainly beech forests; moist mixed forest; and fresh coniferous forests.

== Description ==
The adults of A. stercorosus grow up to 12–19 millimetres (0.47–0.75 in) long and therefore they do not reach the length of the very similar common dung beetle (Geotrupes stercorarius). The body colour is blue-black, while the underside is usually metallic blue. The elytra have seven longitudinal slightly dotted grooves. The wings may be blue, violet or green. Antennae are reddish brown. Geotrupes stercorarius presents three keels on the outer side of the tibia of the third pair of legs, while A. stercorosus presents only two.

== Biology ==
Adults can be encountered from June through the following spring.

In spring they lay eggs in chambers at the end of a corridor dug in the soil that is approximately 70–80 centimetres (28–31 in) long, in which dead plant matter or feces of herbivorous and omnivorous animals are placed to feed the larvae.

The larvae overwinter and pupate in spring, requiring a year to complete the whole process.

Adult dung beetles feed on feces and carrion. They may also feed on litter mold, decomposing fungi and Phallus impudicus.

== Gallery ==
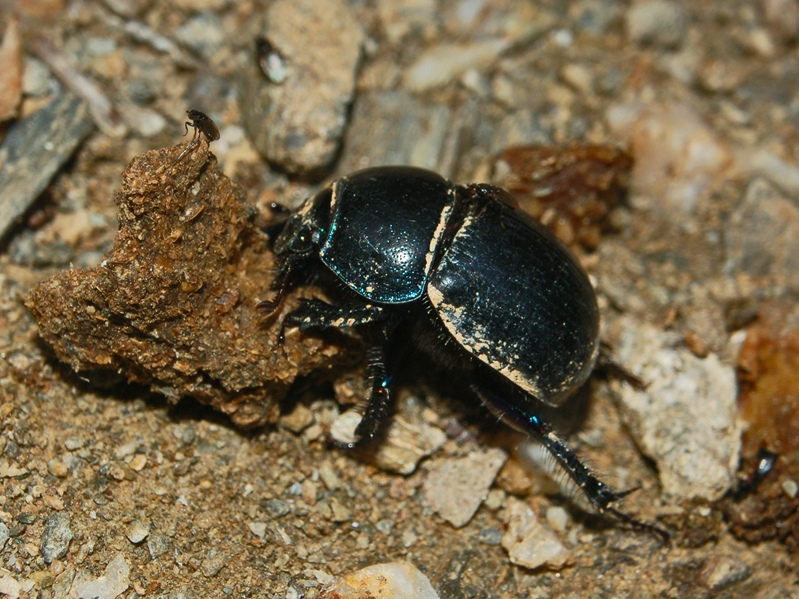
Anoplotrupes stercorosus moving feces

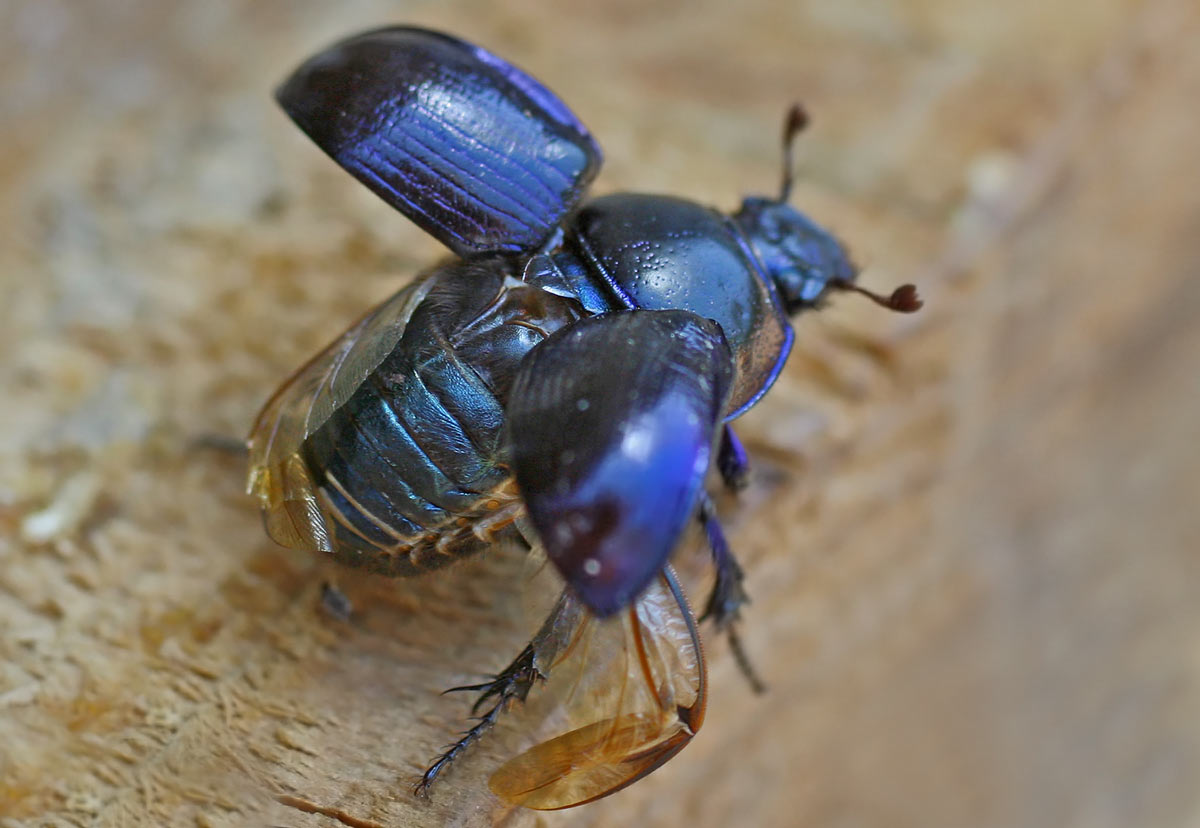
Taking flight

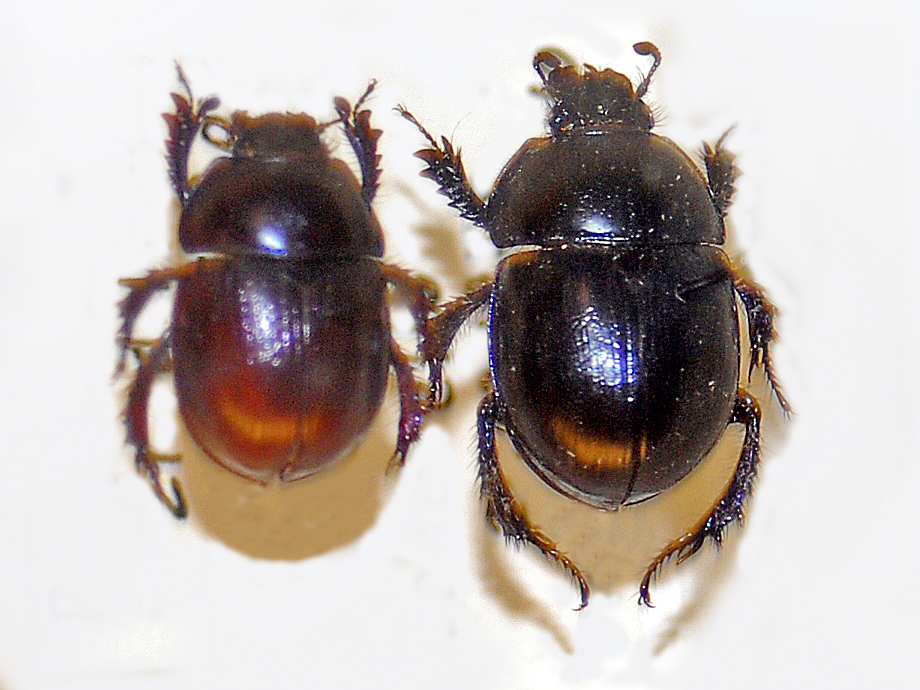
Museum specimen

Video clip

== Bibliography ==
- Anderson, R., Nash, R. & O'Connor, J. P. 1997, Irish Coleoptera: a revised and annotated list, Irish Naturalists' Journal Special Entomological Supplement, 1-81
- Joy, N. H., 1932, A practical handbook of British beetles, H. F. & G. Witherby, London
- Jessop, L., 1986, Coleoptera: Scarabaeoidea. Dung beetles and chafers
- Mann, D., 2002, Geotrupidae in: Checklist of Beetles of the British Isles. www.coleopterist.org.uk
- Mulsant E. (1842) Histoire naturelle des Coléoptères de France. Lamellicornes, Paris, Lyon :1-623
- Scriba L.G. (1791) Entomologische Bemerkungen und Erfahrungen, Journal für die Liebhaber der Entomologie. Frankfurt 1(3):244-255
