= Mycotrupes gaigei =

Scientific classification
- Domain: Eukaryota
- Kingdom: Animalia
- Phylum: Arthropoda
- Class: Insecta
- Order: Coleoptera
- Suborder: Polyphaga
- Infraorder: Scarabaeiformia
- Family: Geotrupidae
- Genus: Mycotrupes
- Species: M. gaigei

Binomial name
- Mycotrupes gaigei Olson & Hubbell, 1954

Species of beetle

Mycotrupes gaigei, the North peninsular mycotrupes beetle, is a species of earth-boring scarab beetle in the family Geotrupidae. It is found in North America.
