= Kuro Burger =

Black hamburger sold by Burger King Japan

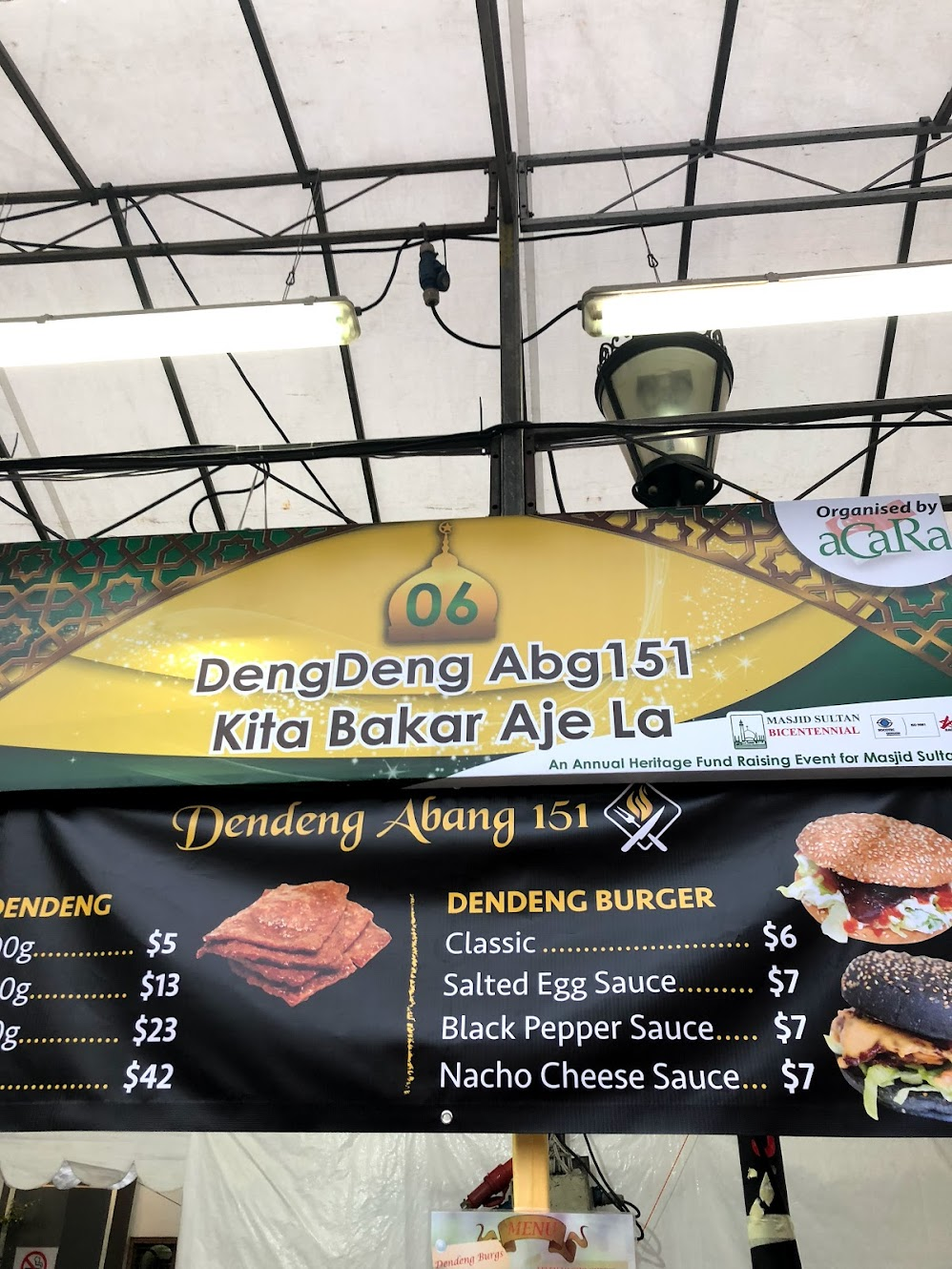
Kuro Burger in the menu of a food stall in Singapore

Kuro Burger ('Kuro' means 'black' in Japanese) is a product line of hamburger sold by the Japanese franchises of the Burger King fast food restaurant chain since 2014. The buns and the cheese of the hamburger are colored black with bamboo charcoal. The ketchup and the onions on the hamburger are colored black with squid ink.

The first Kuro Burger by Burger King was introduced in Japan in 2012 to celebrate the company's fifth year in Japan. In October 2013, a Kuro Ninja Burger was launched as part of a promotional campaign for Burger King Japan, with a "design" inspired by the character Kuro Ninja. The Kuro Burger was permanently added to Burger King's menus in Japan in September 2014.

The Kuro Burger is also sold in Indonesia.
