= Mycotrupes =

Scientific classification
- Kingdom: Animalia
- Phylum: Arthropoda
- Class: Insecta
- Order: Coleoptera
- Suborder: Polyphaga
- Infraorder: Scarabaeiformia
- Family: Geotrupidae
- Subfamily: Geotrupinae
- Tribe: Ceratotrupini
- Genus: Mycotrupes; LeConte, 1866

Genus of beetles

Mycotrupes is a genus of earth-boring scarab beetles in the family Geotrupidae. There are at least 5 described species in Mycotrupes.

== Species ==
- Mycotrupes cartwrighti Olson & Hubbell, 1954
- Mycotrupes gaigei Olson & Hubbell, 1954 (North peninsular mycotrupes beetle)
- Mycotrupes lethroides (Westwood, 1837)
- Mycotrupes pedester Howden, 1954
- Mycotrupes retusus (LeConte, 1866) (sandhills earth boring scarab beetle)
