= Mycotrupes cartwrighti =

Scientific classification
- Domain: Eukaryota
- Kingdom: Animalia
- Phylum: Arthropoda
- Class: Insecta
- Order: Coleoptera
- Suborder: Polyphaga
- Infraorder: Scarabaeiformia
- Family: Geotrupidae
- Genus: Mycotrupes
- Species: M. cartwrighti

Binomial name
- Mycotrupes cartwrighti Olson & Hubbell, 1954

Species of beetle

Mycotrupes cartwrighti is a species of earth-boring scarab beetle in the family Geotrupidae. It is found in North America.
