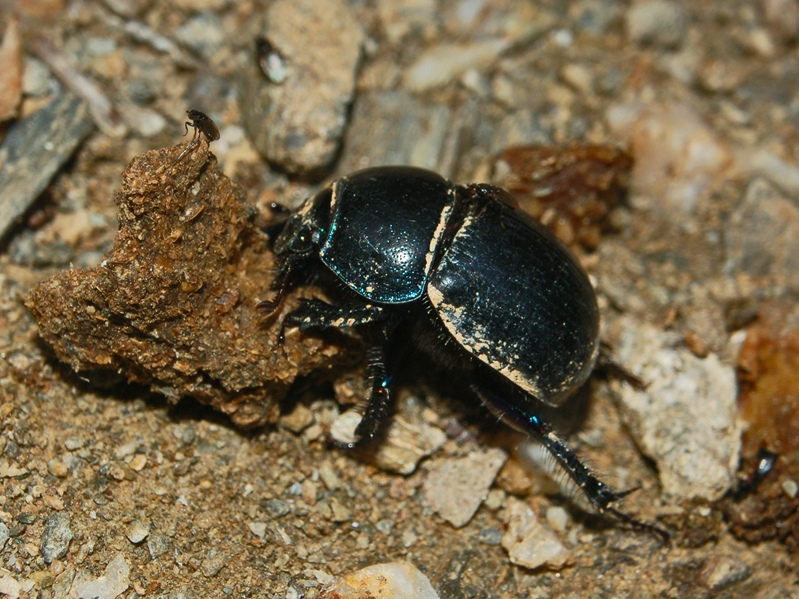
- Anoplotrupes stercorosus

Scientific classification
- Domain: Eukaryota
- Kingdom: Animalia
- Phylum: Arthropoda
- Class: Insecta
- Order: Coleoptera
- Suborder: Polyphaga
- Infraorder: Scarabaeiformia
- Family: Geotrupidae
- Subfamily: Geotrupinae
- Genus: Anoplotrupes; Jekel, 1865

= Anoplotrupes =

Genus of beetles

Anoplotrupes is a genus of earth-boring dung beetles belonging to the family Geotrupidae subfamily Geotrupinae.

== Species ==
Species within this genus include:

- Anoplotrupes balyi (Jekel, 1866)
- Anoplotrupes hornii (Blanchard, 1888)
- Anoplotrupes stercorosus (Hartmann in L.G. Scriba, 1791)
