= Allotrypes =

Scientific classification
- Kingdom: Animalia
- Phylum: Arthropoda
- Class: Insecta
- Order: Coleoptera
- Suborder: Polyphaga
- Infraorder: Scarabaeiformia
- Superfamily: Scarabaeoidea
- Family: Geotrupidae
- Subfamily: Geotrupinae
- Genus: Allotrypes; François, 1904
- Species: A. mandibularis

Binomial name
- Allotrypes mandibularis (Reitter, 1896)

Synonyms
- Allotrupes Boucomont, 1912 (Missp,)

Genus of beetles

Allotrypes mandibularis is a species of earth-boring dung beetles belonging to the family Geotrupidae, and the sole member of the genus Allotrypes; the genus name has often been misspelled as Allotrupes. This species occurs in the Mediterranean region.
