= Detoxification foot pads =

Pseudoscientific alternative medical adhesive foot pads

Detoxification foot pads are pseudoscientific alternative medical adhesive foot pads or patches that manufacturers claim can dramatically improve health when placed under the feet during sleep. Some of these pads may contain ingredients such as "distilled bamboo vinegar" that allegedly pull toxins from the body, but critics have shown that the process is not scientifically viable.

On January 3, 2008, the United States Food and Drug Administration (FDA) released an urgent warning regarding the potential dangers of many imported pharmaceutical substances, including several brands of detox foot patches. In April 2008, in response to questions from the Associated Press, an FDA spokeswoman said regarding the agency's investigation of the claims made for Kinoki foot pads that "basically, when we open up a case it means that the violation might be in terms of the Food, Drug and Cosmetics Act, such as when (product makers) make false, misleading claims."

In August 2008, National Public Radio commissioned a laboratory test to look for heavy metals in used pads, which Kinoki claims are extracted from the body. The test found none. NPR also discovered that the pads change from white to grey when exposed to moisture, including sweat, and not necessarily because they absorb other substances.

The Japanese company Kenrico claims that their pads have a positive effect on the health of the users, and that they remove heavy metals from the body. There is no evidence that these products work. The skin is one of the body's largest organs of detoxification, there is no proposed mechanism as to why these patches would increase the detoxification rate above baseline.

== Effectiveness ==
While the detoxification foot pads seem to be popular among young populations in some regions, the effect of the pads remains unclear. "Removing heavy metals from the body" seems to be good for health; however, the human body needs a certain amount of heavy metals such as zinc, iron, copper, etc. Excessive amounts of heavy metals can cause disease. Although absorption through skin is one of the ways for the human body to take in heavy metals, it is not clear if the heavy metals can be pulled out of the body through skin. The circadian rhythm is not related to the heavy metal detox, either. There is no evidence that bamboo vinegar has the function of attracting heavy metals. On the other hand, detoxification foot pads can not accurately control how much heavy metal is “detoxified” from the body. The pads have no evidence of identifying what they claim to remove, or the way of measuring their levels in the body.

No studies have been done to measure the amount of accumulated heavy metal on the pad after it has been left overnight. The Japanese company Kinoki claimed their foot pad can cause weight loss by removing toxins, metabolic wastes, heavy metals, and unspecified chemicals from the body. Kinoki also claimed that the pads can treat various kinds of disease, including headaches, depression, and even a weakened immune system. The U.S. District Court for the District of New Jersey ruled that those claims were unsupported.

== See also ==
- Detoxification foot baths
- Detoxification
- Detoxification (alternative medicine)
