= Mycotrupes retusus =

Scientific classification
- Kingdom: Animalia
- Phylum: Arthropoda
- Class: Insecta
- Order: Coleoptera
- Suborder: Polyphaga
- Infraorder: Scarabaeiformia
- Family: Geotrupidae
- Genus: Mycotrupes
- Species: M. retusus

Binomial name
- Mycotrupes retusus Le Conte, 1866

Synonyms
- Geotrupes aeneus Felsche, 1909

Species of beetle

Mycotrupes retusus is a species belonging to the family Geotrupidae ("earth-boring scarab beetles"), in the order Coleoptera ("beetles"). The species is generally known as the "sandhills earth boring scarab beetle". It is found in North America.
