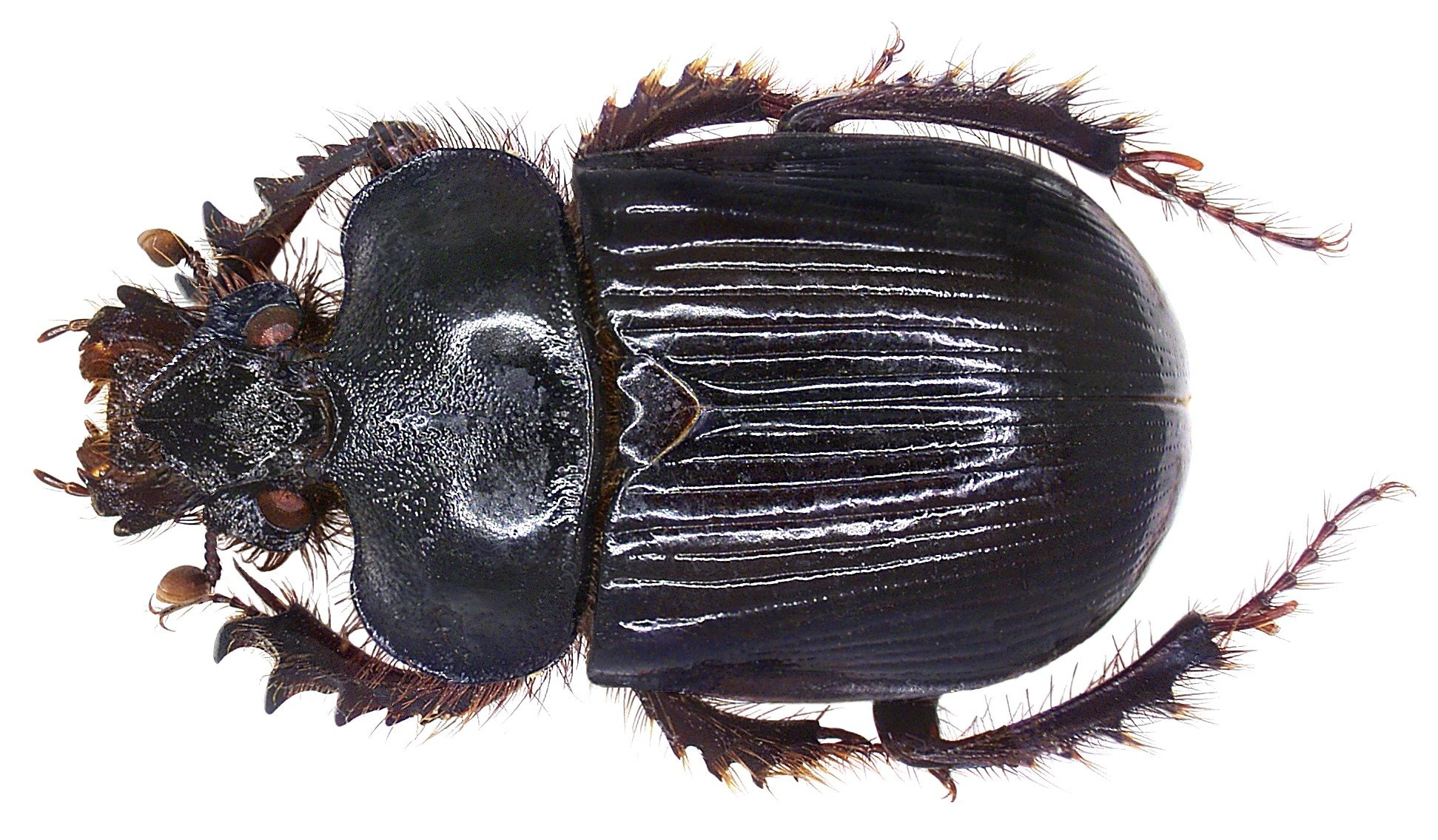
- Ceratophyus hoffmannseggi

Scientific classification
- Kingdom: Animalia
- Phylum: Arthropoda
- Class: Insecta
- Order: Coleoptera
- Suborder: Polyphaga
- Infraorder: Scarabaeiformia
- Family: Geotrupidae
- Subfamily: Geotrupinae; Latreille, 1802

Tribes
- Ceratotrupini Zunino, 1984; Enoplotrupini Paulian, 1945; Geotrupini Latreille, 1802; Lethrini Oken, 1843; † Cretogeotrupini Nikolajev, 1996

Synonyms
- Lethrinae Oken, 1843

= Geotrupinae =

Subfamily of beetles

Geotrupinae is a subfamily of earth-boring scarab beetles in the family Geotrupidae. There are more than 30 genera and 450 described species in Geotrupinae.

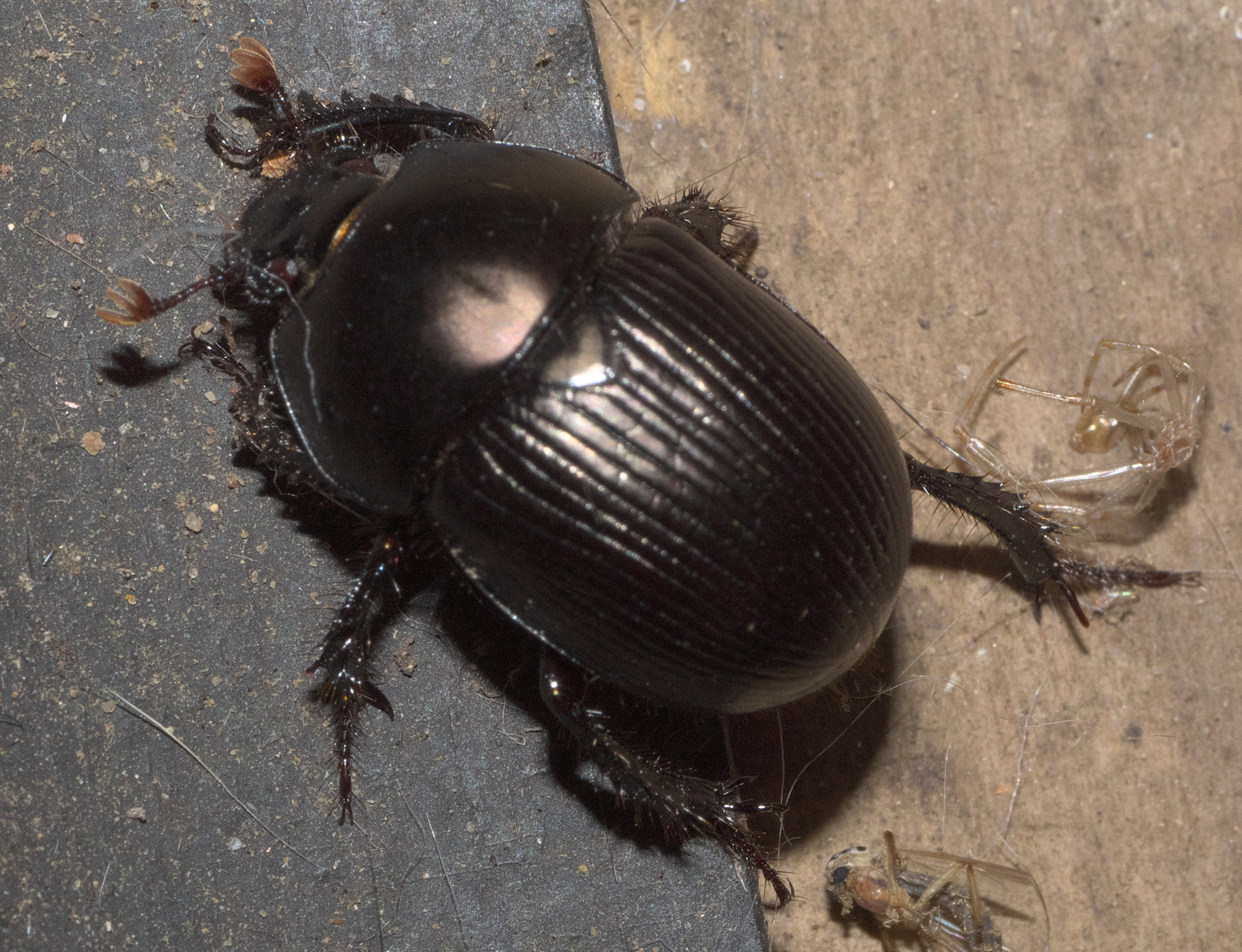
Geotrupes

== Genera ==
These 31 genera belong to the subfamily Geotrupinae:

- Allotrypes François, 1904
- Anoplotrupes Jekel, 1865
- Ceratophyus Fischer von Waldheim, 1823
- Ceratotrupes Jekel, 1865
- Chelotrupes Jekel, 1866
- Cnemotrupes Jekel, 1866
- Enoplotrupes Lucas, 1869
- Epigeotrupes Bovo & Zunino, 1983
- Geohowdenius Zunino, 1984
- Geotrupes Latreille, 1796
- Geotrupoides Handlirsch, 1906
- Glyptogeotrupes Nikolaev, 1979
- Halffterius Zunino, 1984
- Haplogeotrupes Nikolaev, 1979
- Jekelius Lopez-Colon, 1989
- Lethrus Scopoli, 1777
- Megatrupes Zunino, 1984
- Mycotrupes LeConte, 1866
- Odontotrypes Fairmaire, 1887
- Onthotrupes Howden, 1964
- Peltotrupes Blanchard, 1888
- Phelotrupes Jekel, 1866
- Pseudotrypocopris Mikšic, 1954
- Sericotrupes Zunino, 1984
- Thorectes Mulsant, 1842
- Trypocopris Motschulsky, 1859
- Typhaeus Leach, 1815
- Zuninoeus López-Colón, 1989
- † Cretogeotrupes Nikolajev, 1992
- † Lithogeotrupes Nikolajev, 2008
- † Parageotrupes Nikolajev & Ren, 2010
