= Mycotrupes lethroides =

Scientific classification
- Kingdom: Animalia
- Phylum: Arthropoda
- Clade: Pancrustacea
- Class: Insecta
- Order: Coleoptera
- Suborder: Polyphaga
- Infraorder: Scarabaeiformia
- Family: Geotrupidae
- Genus: Mycotrupes
- Species: M. lethroides

Binomial name
- Mycotrupes lethroides (Westwood, 1837)

Species of beetle

Mycotrupes lethroides is a species in the family Geotrupidae ("earth-boring scarab beetles"), in the order Coleoptera ("beetles"). Mycotrupes lethroides is endemic to Georgia, USA, particularly to the sandhills of the Fall Line Region and upper Coastal Plain in the Savannah River Basin near Augusta.
