= Oil pulling =

Alternative medical practice

Oil pulling is an alternative medical practice in which an edible oil is swished around the mouth for a period of time and then spat out, similar to mouthwash. It originates from Ayurvedic medicine.

Practitioners of oil pulling claim it is capable of improving oral health. Its promoters claim it works by pulling out toxins, but there is no credible evidence to support this.

== History ==
Oil pulling stems from traditional Ayurvedic medicine, whose practitioners may use sunflower oil, coconut oil, olive oil, or other herbal oils.

== Criticism ==
There is no high-quality research on oil pulling, no understanding of a possible mechanism explaining how it would work, and no evidence that it provides any benefit. The American Dental Association agrees that there are no reliable scientific studies supporting the practice of oil pulling for any benefit to oral hygiene or overall wellbeing.

The Canadian Dental Association assessed the practice of oil pulling in 2014 stating: "We sense oil pulling won't do any harm, we're not convinced there are any particular benefits to it."

== See also ==
- Traditional medicine
- List of topics characterized as pseudoscience
