= Charcoal biscuit =

Type of food biscuit for medicinal purposes

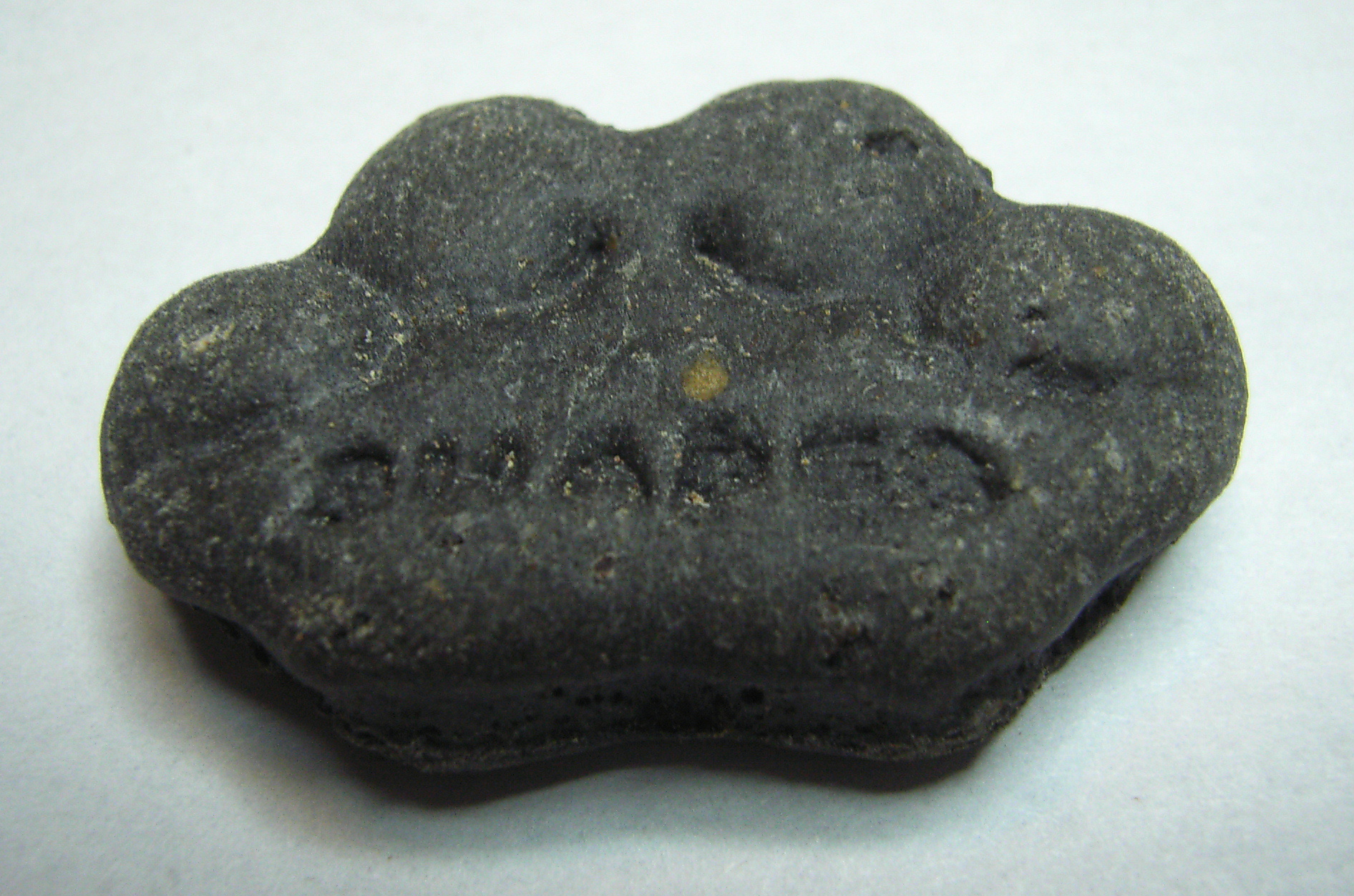
Charcoal dog biscuit (Winalot Shapes)

A charcoal biscuit is a biscuit based on a powdered willow charcoal or activated carbon mixed with ordinary flour, and made into dough with butter, sugar and eggs.

== History ==
Charcoal biscuits were first made in England in the early 19th century as an antidote to flatulence and stomach trouble. The Retrospect of Practical Medicine and Surgery, a medical text published in 1856, recommends charcoal biscuits for gastric problems, saying each biscuit contained ten grains (648 mg) of charcoal. Vegetable Charcoal: Its Medicinal and Economic Properties with Practical Remarks on Its Use in Chronic Affections of the Stomach and Bowels, published in 1857, recommends charcoal biscuits as an excellent method of administering charcoal to children.

== Contemporary forms ==
In modern times charcoal biscuits are made in the form of crackers to accompany cheeses. The biscuits have a slight hint of charcoal taste that is described by some as pleasing. The biscuits have also been marketed as a pet care product to control flatulence in pets, and as aids to digestion or stomach problems in humans.

== Cultural references ==
In Brideshead Revisited, Evelyn Waugh writes of Charles Ryder consuming charcoal biscuits and iced coffee while cramming for exams at Oxford. Ludwig Wittgenstein is said to have eaten very little else while staying in Ireland.

Several of Terry Pratchett's Discworld books mention charcoal biscuits. In Hogfather they are a restorative for the God of Indigestion. In Reaper Man, they are implicated in the explosive death of Mustrum Ridcully's uncle. In Men At Arms, they are a treat for a small dragon, and in Guards! Guards! another small dragon in danger of being flamed by a much larger dragon looks "as though he might be turned into a small flying charcoal biscuit".

== See also ==
- Activated charcoal
- Benzopyrene
