= Detoxification =

Removal of toxic substances from an organism

Detoxification or detoxication (detox for short) is the physiological or medicinal removal of toxic substances from a living organism, including the human body, which is mainly carried out by the liver. Additionally, it can refer to the period of drug withdrawal during which an organism returns to homeostasis after long-term use of an addictive substance. In medicine, detoxification can be achieved by decontamination of poison ingestion and the use of antidotes as well as techniques such as dialysis and (in a limited number of cases) chelation therapy.

Many alternative medicine practitioners promote various types of detoxification such as detoxification diets. Sense about Science, a UK-based charitable trust, determined that most such dietary "detox" claims lack any supporting evidence.

The liver and kidney are naturally capable of detox, as are intracellular (specifically, inner membrane of mitochondria or in the endoplasmic reticulum of cells) proteins such as CYP enzymes. In cases of kidney failure, the action of the kidneys is mimicked by dialysis; kidney and liver transplants are also used for kidney and liver failure, respectively.

== Types ==
=== Alcohol detoxification ===
Alcohol detoxification is a process by which a heavy drinker's system is brought back to normal after being habituated to having alcohol in the body continuously for an extended period of substance abuse. Serious alcohol addiction results in a downregulation of GABA neurotransmitter receptors. Precipitous withdrawal from long-term alcohol addiction without medical management can cause severe health problems and can be fatal. Alcohol detox is not a treatment for alcoholism. After detoxification, other treatments must be undertaken to deal with the underlying addiction that caused alcohol use.

=== Drug detoxification ===
Clinicians use drug detoxification to reduce or relieve withdrawal symptoms while helping an addicted person adjust to living without drug use. Drug detoxification does not aim to treat addiction but rather represents an early step within long-term treatment. Detoxification may be achieved drug-free or may use medications as an aspect of treatment. Often drug detoxification and treatment will occur in a community program that lasts several months and takes place in a residential setting rather than in a medical center.

Drug detoxification varies depending on the location of treatment, but most detox centers provide treatment to avoid the symptoms of physical withdrawal from alcohol and from other drugs. Most also incorporate counseling and therapy during detox to help with the consequences of withdrawal.

=== Metabolic detoxification ===
An animal's metabolism can produce harmful substances which it can then make less toxic through reduction, oxidation (collectively known as redox reactions), conjugation and excretion of molecules from cells or tissues. This is called xenobiotic metabolism. Enzymes that are important in detoxification metabolism include cytochrome P450 oxidases, UDP-glucuronosyltransferases, and glutathione S-transferases. These processes are particularly well-studied as part of drug metabolism, as they influence the pharmacokinetics of a drug in the body.

== Alternative medicine ==
Certain approaches in alternative medicine claim to remove alleged "toxins" from the body through herbal, electrical, electromagnetic or other treatments. These toxins may not be linked to symptoms and treatments have no scientific evidence, making the validity of such techniques questionable. There is little evidence for toxic accumulation in these cases, as the liver and kidneys automatically detoxify and excrete many toxic materials including metabolic wastes. Under this theory, if toxins are too rapidly released without being safely eliminated (such as when metabolizing fat that stores toxins), they can damage the body and cause malaise. Such alternative therapies include contrast showers, detoxification foot pads, oil pulling, Gerson therapy, snake-stones, body cleansing, Scientology's and Narconon's Purification Rundown, water fasting, and metabolic therapy.

== See also ==
- Organisms involved in water purification
- Toxification

== Sources ==
- Baldwin DR, Marshall WJ (1999). "Heavy metal poisoning and its laboratory investigation". Annals of Clinical Biochemistry: International Journal of Laboratory Medicine. 36 (3): 267–300. doi:10.1177/000456329903600301. PMID 10376071. S2CID 26671861.
- Brathwaite RL, Rabone SD (1985). "Heavy Metal Sulphide Deposits and Geochemical Surveys for Heavy Metals in New Zealand". Journal of the Royal Society of New Zealand. 15 (4): 363–370. Bibcode:1985JRSNZ..15..363B. doi:10.1080/03036758.1985.10421713.
- Dewan S (December 26, 2008). "Tennessee Ash Flood Larger Than Initial Estimate". New York Times.
- Dewan S (January 1, 2009). "Metal Levels Found High in Tributary After Spill". New York Times.
- Poovey B (September 15, 2001). "Trial Starts on Damage Lawsuits in TVA Ash Spill". Bloomberg Businessweek.
- Pourret O, Bollinger JC, Hursthouse A (June 2021). "Heavy metal: a misused term?". Acta Geochimica. 40 (3): 466–471. Bibcode:2021AcGch..40..466P. doi:10.1007/s11631-021-00468-0. ISSN 2096-0956.
- Srivastava S, Goyal P (2010). Novel Biomaterials: Decontamination of Toxic Metals from Wastewater. Springer-Verlag. ISBN 978-3-642-11329-1.
- "10 chemicals of public health concern". World Health Organization. June 1, 2020.
