= Detoxification (alternative medicine) =

Alternative medicine treatment without scientific basis for claims made

Alternative therapy
- Claims: Removal of unspecified toxins from the body

Detoxification (often shortened to detox and sometimes called body cleansing) is a type of alternative medicine treatment which aims to rid the body of unspecified "toxins" – substances that proponents claim accumulate in the body over time and have undesirable short-term or long-term effects on individual health. It is not to be confused with detoxification carried out by the liver and kidneys, which filter the blood and remove harmful substances to be processed and eliminated from the body. Activities commonly associated with detoxification include dieting, fasting, consuming exclusively or avoiding specific foods (such as fats, carbohydrates, fruits, vegetables, juices, herbs), colon cleansing, chelation therapy, certain kinds of IV therapy and the removal of dental fillings containing amalgam.

Scientists and health organizations have criticized the concept of detoxification for its unsound scientific basis and for the lack of evidence for claims made. The "toxins" usually remain undefined, with little to no evidence of toxic accumulation in the patient. The British organisation Sense about Science has described some detox diets and commercial products as "a waste of time and money", while the British Dietetic Association called the idea "nonsense" and a "marketing myth". Dara Mohammadi summarizes "detoxing" as "a scam [...] a pseudo-medical concept designed to sell you things", and Edzard Ernst, emeritus professor of complementary medicine, describes it as a term for conventional medical treatments for addiction which has been "hijacked by entrepreneurs, quacks and charlatans to sell a bogus treatment".

== Background ==
Suspicions of the inefficacy of purging became widespread by the 1830s. Biochemistry and microbiology appeared to support auto-intoxication theory in the 19th century, but by the early twentieth century detoxification-based approaches quickly fell out of favour. Even though abandoned by mainstream medicine, the idea has persisted in the popular imagination and amongst alternative medicine practitioners. Notions of internal cleansing had resurgence along with the rise of alternative medicine in the 1970s and following; it remains unscientific and anachronistic. With the rise of the environmentalist movement, many detox diets use the diet format as a political platform to advocate for environmental ideas about pollution and toxic contamination.

== Types ==
=== Detox diets ===
Detox diets are dietary plans that claim to have detoxifying effects. The general idea suggests that most food contains contaminants: ingredients deemed unnecessary for human life, such as flavor enhancers, food colorings, pesticides, and preservatives. Scientists, dietitians, and doctors, while generally viewing brief "detox diets" as harmless (unless nutritional deficiency results), often dispute the value and need of "detox diets", due to lack of supporting factual evidence or coherent rationale. In cases where a person suffers from a disease, belief in the efficacy of a detox diet can result in delay or failure to seek effective treatment.

Detox diets can involve consuming extremely limited sets of foods (only water or juice, for example, a form of fasting known as juice fasting), eliminating certain foods (such as fats) from the diet, or eliminating ultra-processed foods and alleged irritants. Detox diets are often high in fiber. Proponents claim that this causes the body to burn stored fats, releasing fat-stored "toxins" into the blood, which can then be eliminated through the blood, skin, urine, feces, and breath. Proponents claim that things such as an altered body odor support the notion that detox diets have an effect. The mainstream medical view is that the body has mechanisms to rid itself of toxins, and a healthy diet is best for the body. In the short-term, such detox diet may lead to weight loss, due to the strict caloric restriction, however after returning to a normal diet there is a weight gain. Although a brief fast of a single day is unlikely to cause harm, prolonged fasting (as recommended by certain detox diets) can have dangerous health consequences or can even be fatal.

=== Colon cleansing ===
Colon cleansing involves administration of an enema (colonic) containing some salt, and sometimes coffee or herbs to remove food that, according to proponents, remains in the colon, producing nonspecific symptoms and general ill-health. However, the colon usually does not require any help cleaning itself. The practice can be potentially dangerous if incorrectly practised.

=== Heavy metals ===
Practitioners may recommend detoxification as a treatment to address the notion that mercury poisoning arises from consumption of contaminated fish and from dental amalgam fillings – Quackwatch states: "Removing good fillings is not merely a waste of money. In some cases, it results in tooth loss because when fillings are drilled out, some of the surrounding tooth structure will be removed with it."

=== "Detoxification" devices ===
Certain devices are promoted to allegedly remove toxins from the body. One version involves a foot-bath using a mild electric current, while another involves small adhesive pads applied to the skin (usually the foot). In both cases, the production of an alleged brown "toxin" appears after a brief delay. In the case of the foot bath, the "toxin" is actually small amounts of rusted iron leaching from the electrodes. The adhesive pads change color due to oxidation of the pads' ingredients in response to the skin's moisture. In both cases, the same color changes occur irrespective of whether the water or patch even makes contact with the skin (they merely require water, thus proving the color change does not result from any body detoxification process).

== Criticism ==
=== Unsound scientific basis ===
A 2015 review of clinical evidence about detox diets concluded: "At present, there is no compelling evidence to support the use of detox diets for weight management or toxin elimination. Considering the financial costs to consumers, unsubstantiated claims and potential health risks of detox products, they should be discouraged by health professionals and subject to independent regulatory review and monitoring."

Detoxification and body cleansing products and diets have been criticized for their unsound scientific basis, in particular their premise of nonexistent "toxins" and their appropriation of the legitimate medical concept of detoxification. According to the Mayo Clinic, the "toxins" typically remain unspecified, and there is little to no evidence of toxic accumulation in patients treated. According to a British Dietetic Association (BDA) Fact Sheet, "The whole idea of detox is nonsense. The body is a well-developed system that has its own builtin mechanisms to detoxify and remove waste and toxins." It went on to characterize the idea as a "marketing myth", while other critics have called the idea a "scam" and a "hoax". The organization Sense about Science investigated "detox" products, calling them a waste of time and money, resulting in a report that concluded the term is used differently by different companies, most offered no evidence to support their claims, and in most cases its use was the simple renaming of "mundane things, like cleaning or brushing".

The human body is naturally capable of maintaining itself, with several organs dedicated to cleansing the blood and the gut. Alan Boobis, a professor and toxicologist at Imperial College London, states:

The body’s own detoxification systems are remarkably sophisticated and versatile. They have to be, as the natural environment that we evolved in is hostile. It is remarkable that people are prepared to risk seriously disrupting these systems with unproven ‘detox’ diets, which could well do more harm than good.

Scientific skeptic author Brian Dunning investigated the subject in 2008 and concluded that:

Anyone interested in detoxifying their body might think about paying a little more attention to their body and less attention to the people trying to get their money … Why is it that so many people are more comfortable self-medicating for conditions that exist only in advertisements, than they are simply taking their doctor’s advice? It’s because doctors are burdened with the need to actually practice medicine. They won’t hide bad news from you or make up easy answers to please you.

Despite unsound scientific basis, detoxification is popular, and detoxification products and regimes have become a profitable health trend. As with some other alternative medicine treatments, efficacy has been attributed to astroturfing, the placebo effect, psychosomatic improvements, or natural recovery from illness that would have occurred without use of the product.

Edzard Ernst argued that detox is by definition medical fraud.

== See also ==
- List of diets
