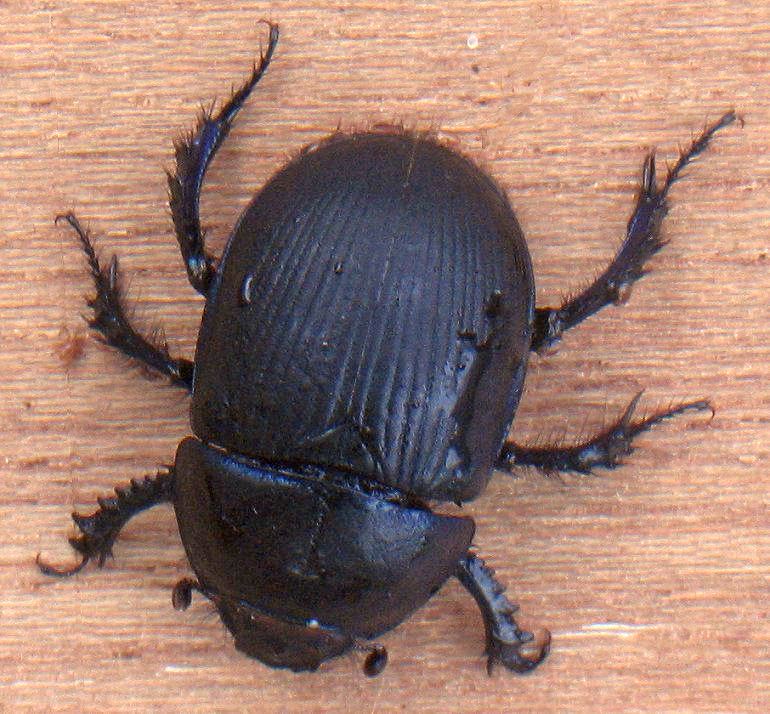

Scientific classification
- Kingdom: Animalia
- Phylum: Arthropoda
- Clade: Pancrustacea
- Class: Insecta
- Order: Coleoptera
- Suborder: Polyphaga
- Infraorder: Scarabaeiformia
- Family: Geotrupidae
- Genus: Geotrupes
- Species: G. stercorarius

Binomial name
- Geotrupes stercorarius (Linnaeus, 1758)

= Geotrupes stercorarius =

Species of beetle

Geotrupes stercorarius is a species of earth-boring dung beetle. Its common name is the dor beetle or the dumbledore, and is common throughout Europe.

== Description ==
The beetle is up to 2.5 cm (1 in) long. The whole beetle is weakly lustrous and darkly colored, sometimes with a bluish sheen. The body shape is very compact and arched toward the top. On each elytron seven long rows of points are just visible. The head is clearly forward, and similar to a shovel in shape. The antennae are short and thicken into fans at the ends. On each leg there are numerous spikes.

== Ecology ==
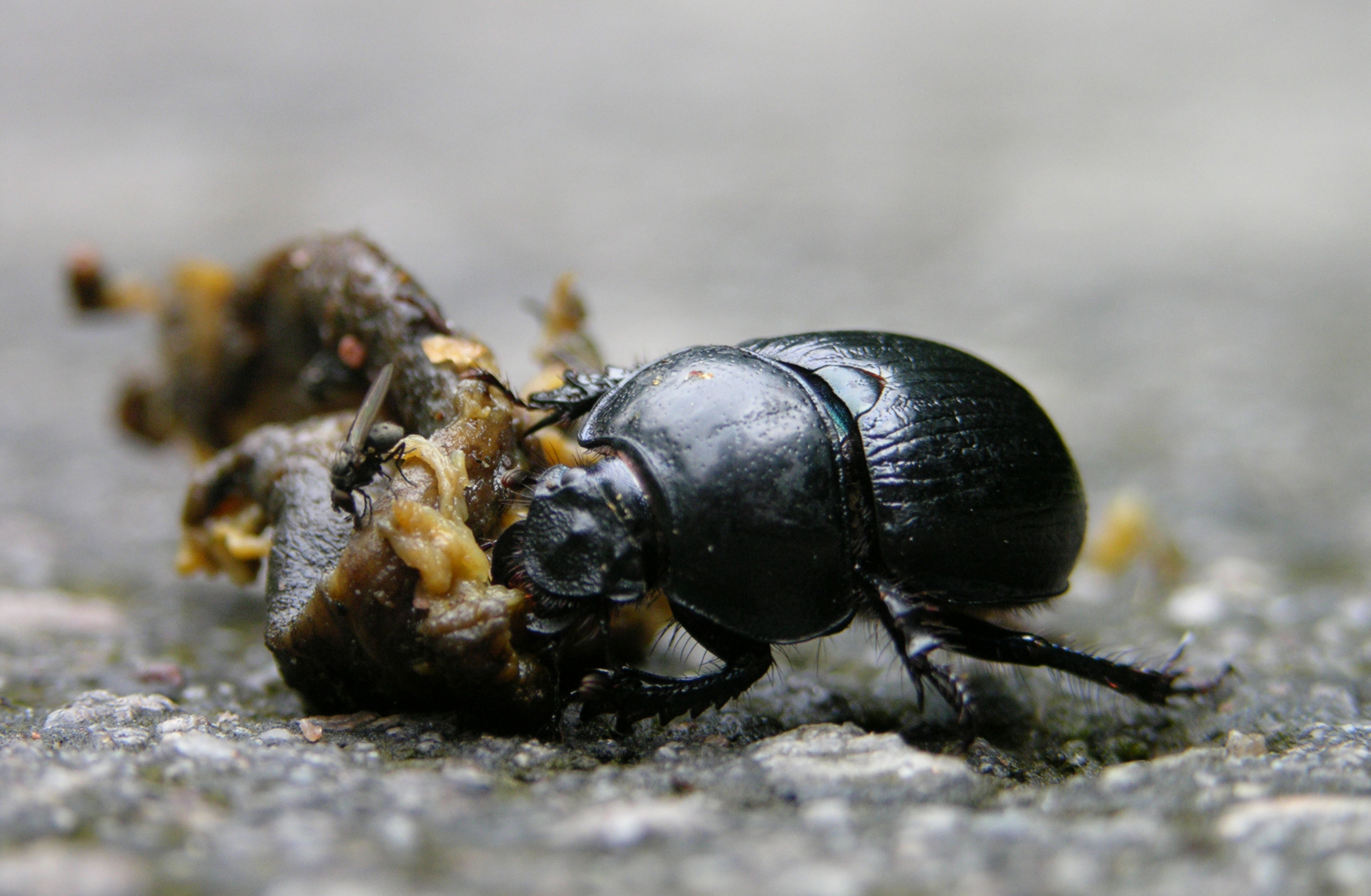
A Geotrupes stercorarius moving a dead slug.

Geotrupes stercorarius is coprophagous, feeding on the droppings of herbivorous animals. They show a preference for horse dung but are not uncommon in cattle dung and have also been recorded from other species as well as at rotting fungi. Adults appear a little later in the year than G. spiniger, generally from April or May, and might occur wherever suitable host material is abundant; cattle pastures, moorland and hillsides, they are mostly crepuscular or nocturnal and may be seen in flight, often around cattle as they lie in fields, or attracted to light in large numbers. Mating occurs in the spring and both sexes participate in digging a vertical burrow directly beneath the host material, which may be up to 50 cm (20 in) deep, depending on the substrate. Upon completion, the female will dig a series of horizontal brood chambers off the main burrow, each being provisioned with dung and a single egg before being sealed with soil from the next chamber. Larvae development proceeds through the summer and some will pupate to produce adults in the autumn that will feed and then overwinter in the burrows, while others will remain within the brood chambers and pupate in spring to produce slightly later adults.

In the evenings, one can observe them closely circle around the animals on the ground. They create a chirping sound with their hind legs.
