= Geotrupes balyi =

Scientific classification
- Domain: Eukaryota
- Kingdom: Animalia
- Phylum: Arthropoda
- Class: Insecta
- Order: Coleoptera
- Suborder: Polyphaga
- Infraorder: Scarabaeiformia
- Family: Geotrupidae
- Genus: Geotrupes
- Species: G. balyi

Binomial name
- Geotrupes balyi Jekel, 1865

Synonyms
- Geotrupes similis Jekel, 1865

Species of beetle

Geotrupes balyi, or Baly's earth boring beetle, is a species of earth-boring scarab beetle in the family Geotrupidae. It is found in North America.
