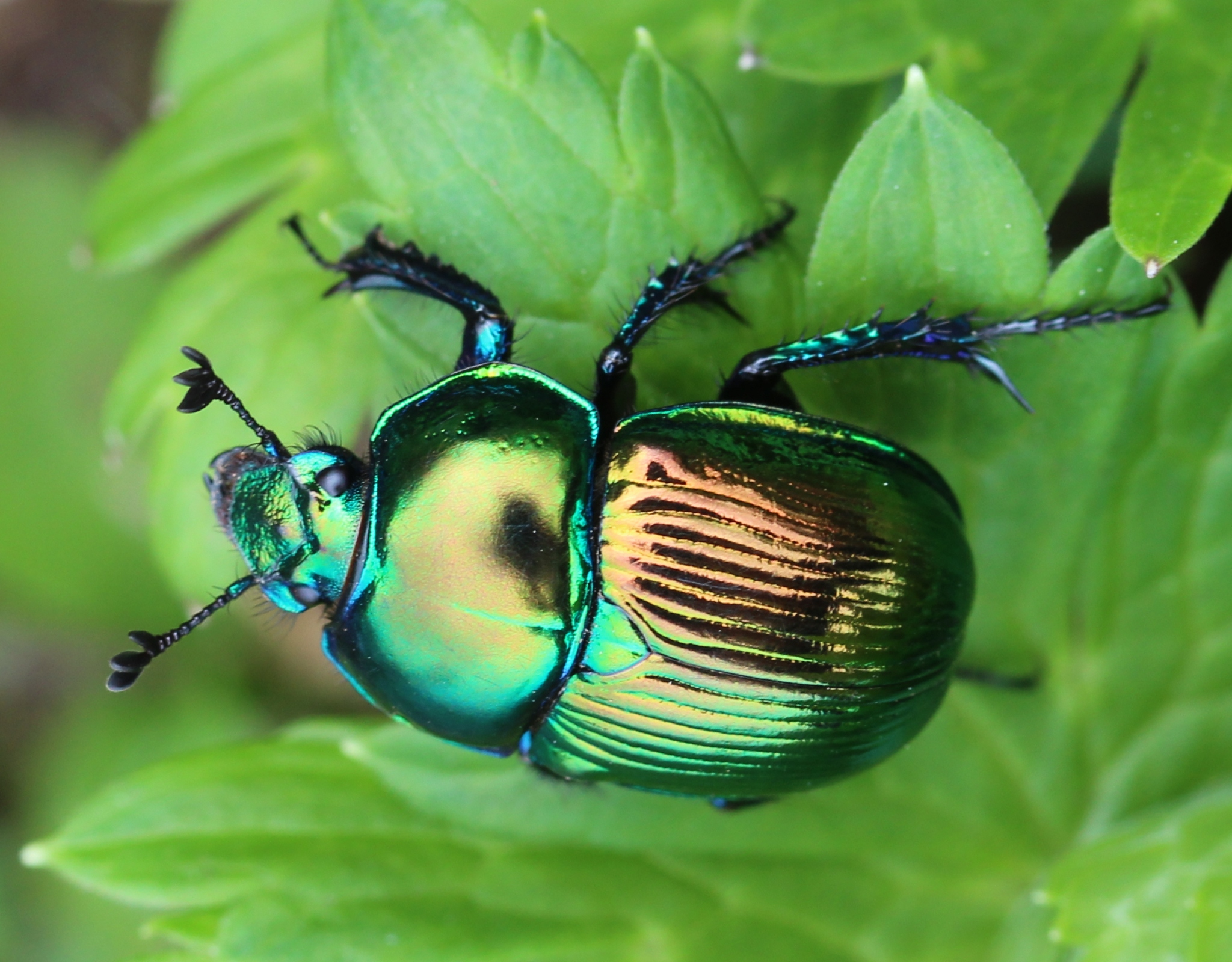
- Phelotrupes auratus

Scientific classification
- Domain: Eukaryota
- Kingdom: Animalia
- Phylum: Arthropoda
- Class: Insecta
- Order: Coleoptera
- Suborder: Polyphaga
- Infraorder: Scarabaeiformia
- Family: Geotrupidae
- Subfamily: Geotrupinae
- Genus: Phelotrupes; Jekel, 1866

= Phelotrupes =

Genus of beetles

Phelotrupes is a genus of beetles in the family Geotrupidae.

== classification ==
This genus includes:

- P. abei Ochi & Kon, 2015
- P. amethystinus Jekel, 1866
- P. annamiticus Král, 2016
- P. armatus Boucomont, 1904
- P. auratus Motschulsky, 1858
- P. beuteli Ochi & Kon, 2017
- P. bicolor Fairmaire, 1888
- P. bolm Král, Malý & Schneider, 2001
- P. brunipennis Ochi & Kon, 2015
- P. businskyorum Král, Malý & Schneider, 2001
- P. caii Ochi & Kon, 2017
- P. cambeforti Král, Malý & Schneider, 2001
- P. cheni Ochi, Kon & Bai, 2010
- P. chenwenlongi Ochi, Masumoto & Lan, 2017
- P. compressidens Fairmaire, 1891
- P. davidis Deyrolle, 1878
- P. denticulatus Boucomont, 1905
- P. deuvei Král, Maly & Schneider, 2001
- P. formosanus Miwa, 1930
- P. holzschuhi Král, Malý & Schneider, 2001
- P. hunanensis Král, Malý & Schneider, 2001
- P. immarginatus Boucomont, 1904
- P. imurai Masumoto, 1995
- P. indicus Boucomont, 1905
- P. insulanus Houden, 1965
- P. jekeli Harold, 1869
- P. jendeki Král, Malý & Schneider, 2001
- P. kachinensis Ochi & Kon, 2015
- P. keitai Ochi, Kon & Toguchi, 2018
- P. kerzhneri Shokhin, 2008
- P. kubani Král, Maly & Schneider, 2001
- P. laevifrons Jekel, 1866
- P. laevistriatus Motschulsky, 1858
- P. lama Červenka, 2009
- P. lenzhiensis Ochi, Kon & Bai, 2021
- P. luhuoensis Ochi, Kon & Bai, 2019
- P. masudai Ochi, Kon & Kawahara, 2010
- P. masumotoi Král, Malý & Schneider, 2001
- P. metallescens Fairmaire, 1894
- P. motuoensis Ochi, Kon & Bai, 2020
- P. nikolajevi Král, Malý & Schneider, 2001
- P. oberthuri Boucomont, 1904
- P. obscuratus Fairmaire, 1889
- P. orientalis Westwood, 1839
- P. oshimanus Fairmaire, 1895
- P. reni Ochi, Kon & Bai, 2017
- P. schoolmeesteri Ochi, Kon & Kawahara, 2010
- P. scutellatus Fairmaire, 1887
- P. semiannamiticus Ochi, Kon & Pham, 2020
- P. semibicolor Ochi, Kon & Bai, 2017
- P. semidenticulatus Ochi, Kon & Bai, 2017
- P. shangrilensis Ochi, Kon & Bai, 2017
- P. smetanai Král, Malý & Schneider, 2001
- P. strnadi Král, Malý & Schneider, 2001
- P. subaeneus Ochi, Kon & Bai, 2010
- P. substriatellus Fairmaire, 1897
- P. taiwanis Miyake & Yamaya, 1995
- P. tenuestriatus Fairmaire, 1887
- P. todai Ochi, Kon & Kawahara, 2010
- P. variolicollis Boucomont, 1904
- P. vietnamicus Ochi, Kon & Pham, 2017
- P. weiweii Ochi, Kon & Bai, 2017
- P. todai Ochi, Kon & Kawahara, 2010
- P. wrzecionkoi Král, Maly & Schneider, 2001
- P. yangi Ochi, Kon & Bai, 2010
- P. yunnanensis Král, Maly & Schneider, 2001
- P. zhangi Ochi, Kon & Bai, 2010
