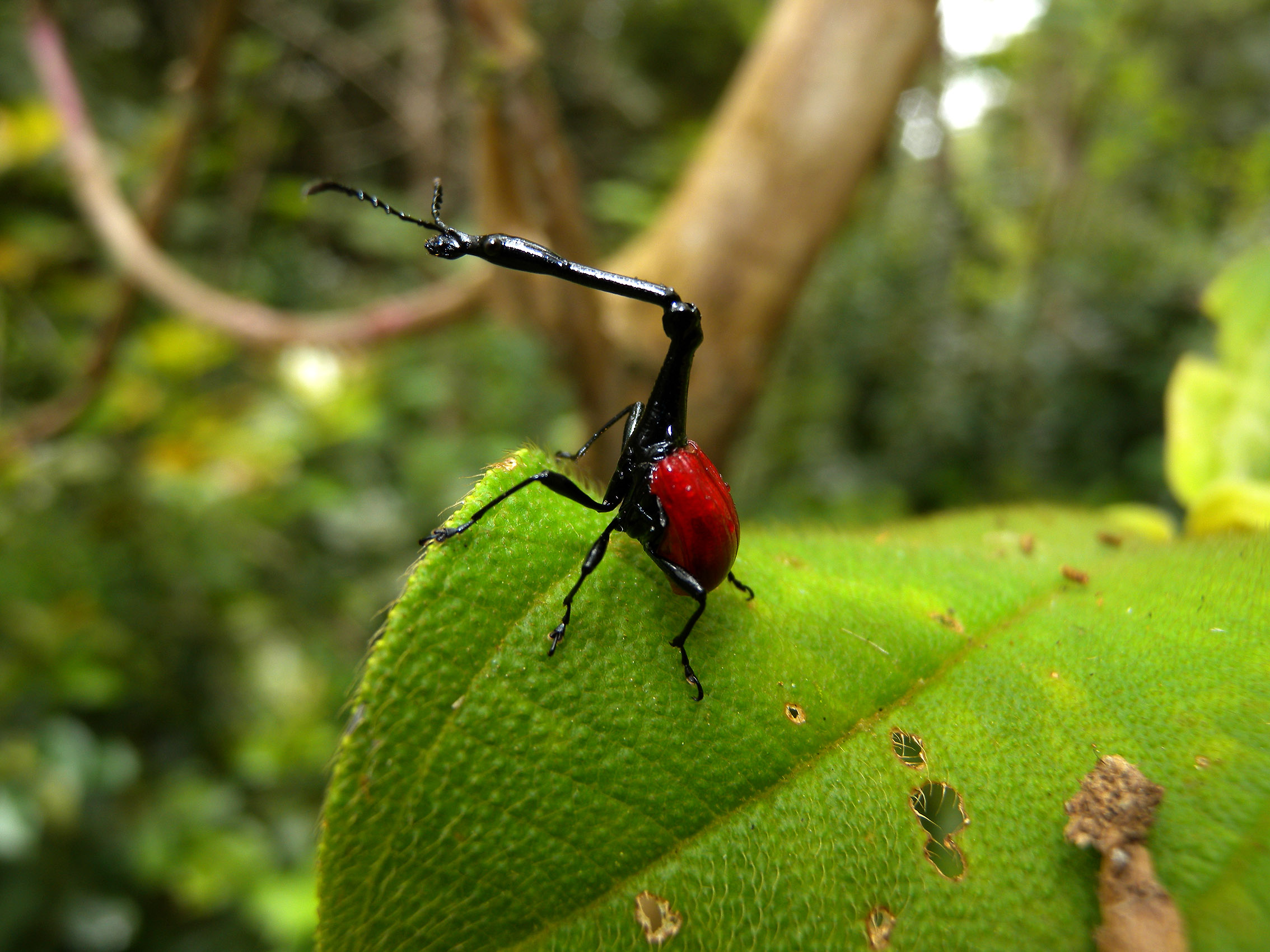
- Male
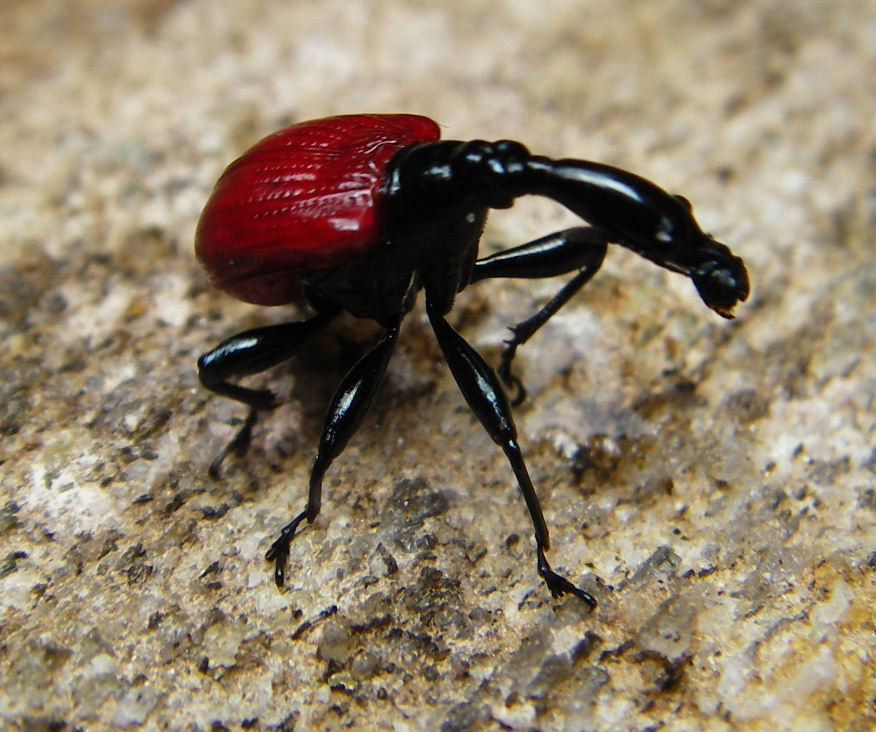
- Female

Conservation status
- Near Threatened (IUCN 3.1)

Scientific classification
- Kingdom: Animalia
- Phylum: Arthropoda
- Clade: Pancrustacea
- Class: Insecta
- Order: Coleoptera
- Suborder: Polyphaga
- Infraorder: Cucujiformia
- Superfamily: Curculionoidea
- Family: Attelabidae
- Genus: Trachelophorus
- Species: T. giraffa

Binomial name
- Trachelophorus giraffa Jekel, 1860

= Giraffe weevil =

Species of beetle

The giraffe weevil (Trachelophorus giraffa) is a species of small weevil endemic to Madagascar. They can grow up to 1 to 2 inches in length and can leap up to 100 times their body length. Giraffe weevils are black-bodied and have bright red elytra covering their wings. They are known for their elongated necks, with the males having necks 2 to 3 times the size of their female counterparts. There are several advantages to their elongated necks, including using them for combat, attracting mates, building nests, and acquiring resources. In the field of coleopterology, giraffe weevils are of interest because they exhibit sexual dimorphism. There are other beetle species that share the common name giraffe weevil, like the New Zealand giraffe weevil Lasiorhynchus barbicornis. The giraffe weevil is commonly misidentified another beetle with a similar appearance, Cybebus dimidiatus.

== Diet and lifestyle ==
During their lifecycle, which is only estimated at one year, Giraffe weevils spend the entirety of their lives on trees in the Madagascar forests. As such these weevils' diets primarily consist of the leaves and sap of two species of Dichaetanthera trees in which they dwell, Dichaetanthera arborea and Dichaetanthera cordifol. These trees are subsequently referred to as the "giraffe beetle trees".

These weevils display significant dexterity as they roll leaves up into protective tubing which they can crawl into to rest at night, curled up with their necks pressed against their abdomen. When morning comes, they emerge and stretch out to get their blood flowing.

Males have been observed to participate in sparring; they advantageously use their long neck similarly to a club to strike other males, swinging their head side to side against their opponent. During the breeding season, the competition for a mate drives their battles to become more serious as they attempt to dislodge the other from their respective leaf or branch.

== Predators ==
Research has not identified any predators that specifically target giraffe weevils. Common predators in the Madagascar forest that prey upon beetles and their larvae in general are birds and small mammals like lemurs and fossa.

== Reproduction ==
In order to attract a mating partner male giraffe weevils have been known to perform elaborate displays involving the swaying of their necks, showcasing their vibrant colors. The female giraffe weevil then evaluates the dance and if she approves, the male will have the opportunity to engage in courtship.

While there has not been any quantitative research regarding the reproductive habits of giraffe weevils, certain observations have shed light on some unique behaviors. Females may roll up a leaf and lay a single egg inside the leaf tube, tightly wrapping it with silk she produces until it forms a cylindrical case. She then snips it off to fall onto the forest floor. The leaf then provides the larva with food in its first days of life.

== Sexual dimorphism ==
Giraffe weevils exhibit sexual dimorphism. Male giraffe weevils have elongated necks that females lack.

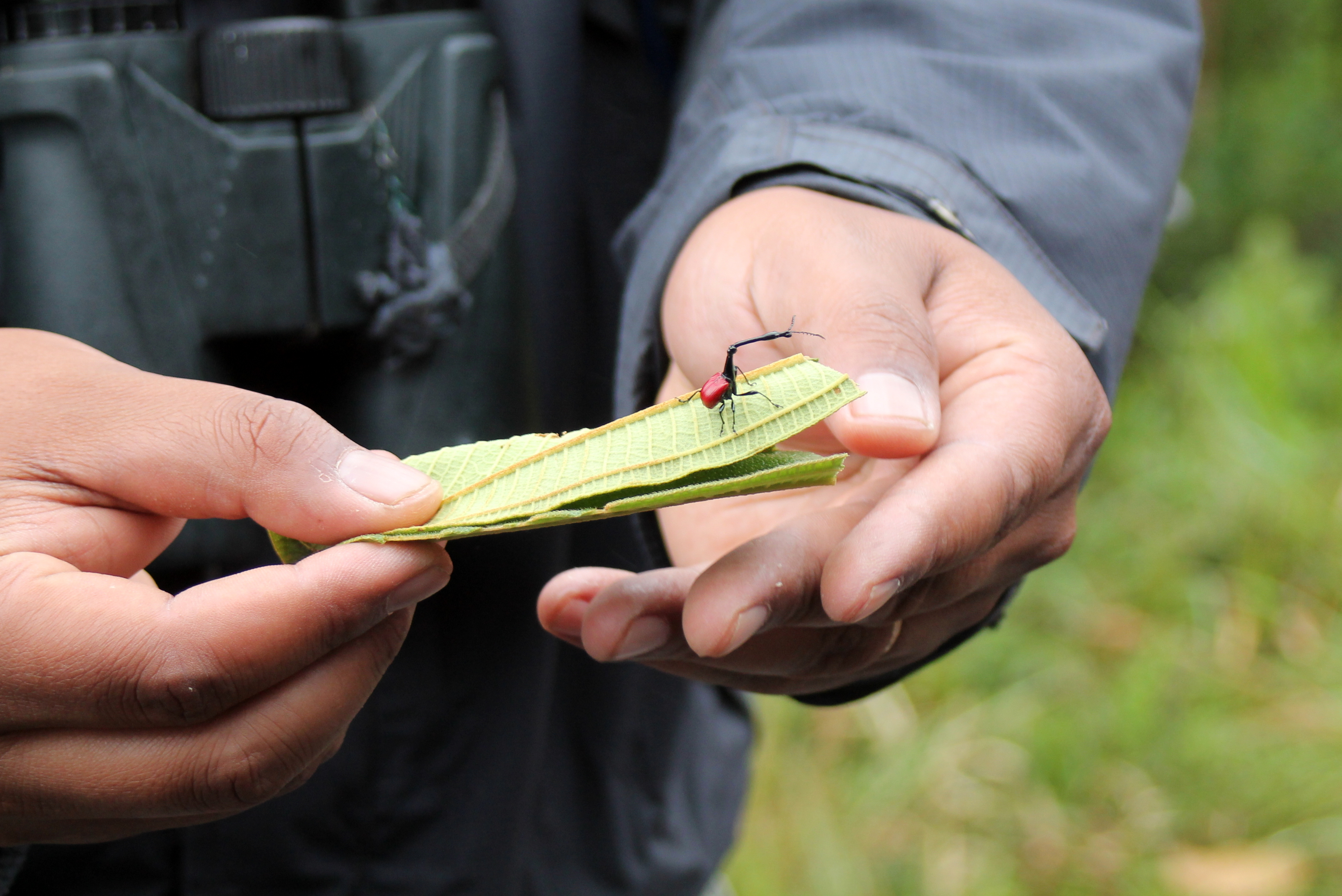
Being handled.

== Culture ==
Many cultures use beetles as a form of art and expression. The giraffe weevil can be seen in Madagascar communities being sold and used as décor or jewelry. The price for a giraffe weevil in Madagascar in 2021 was around 10 USD.

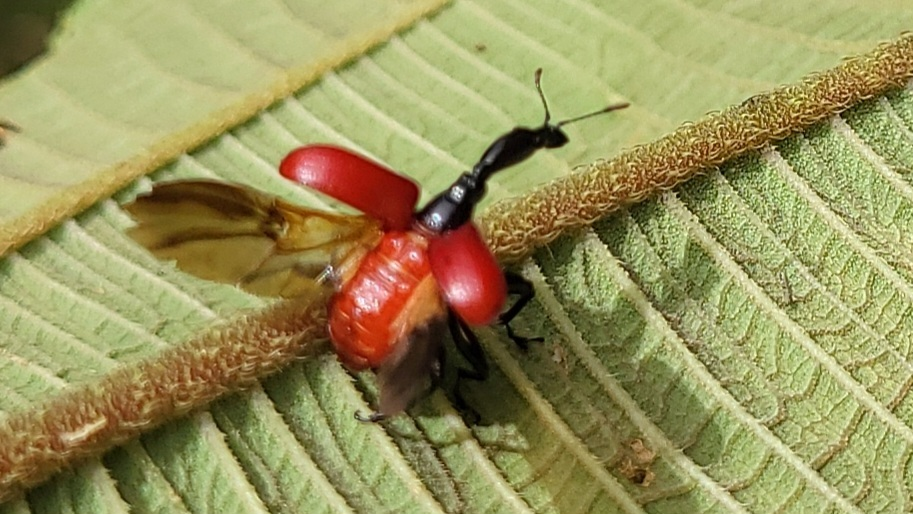
Wings
