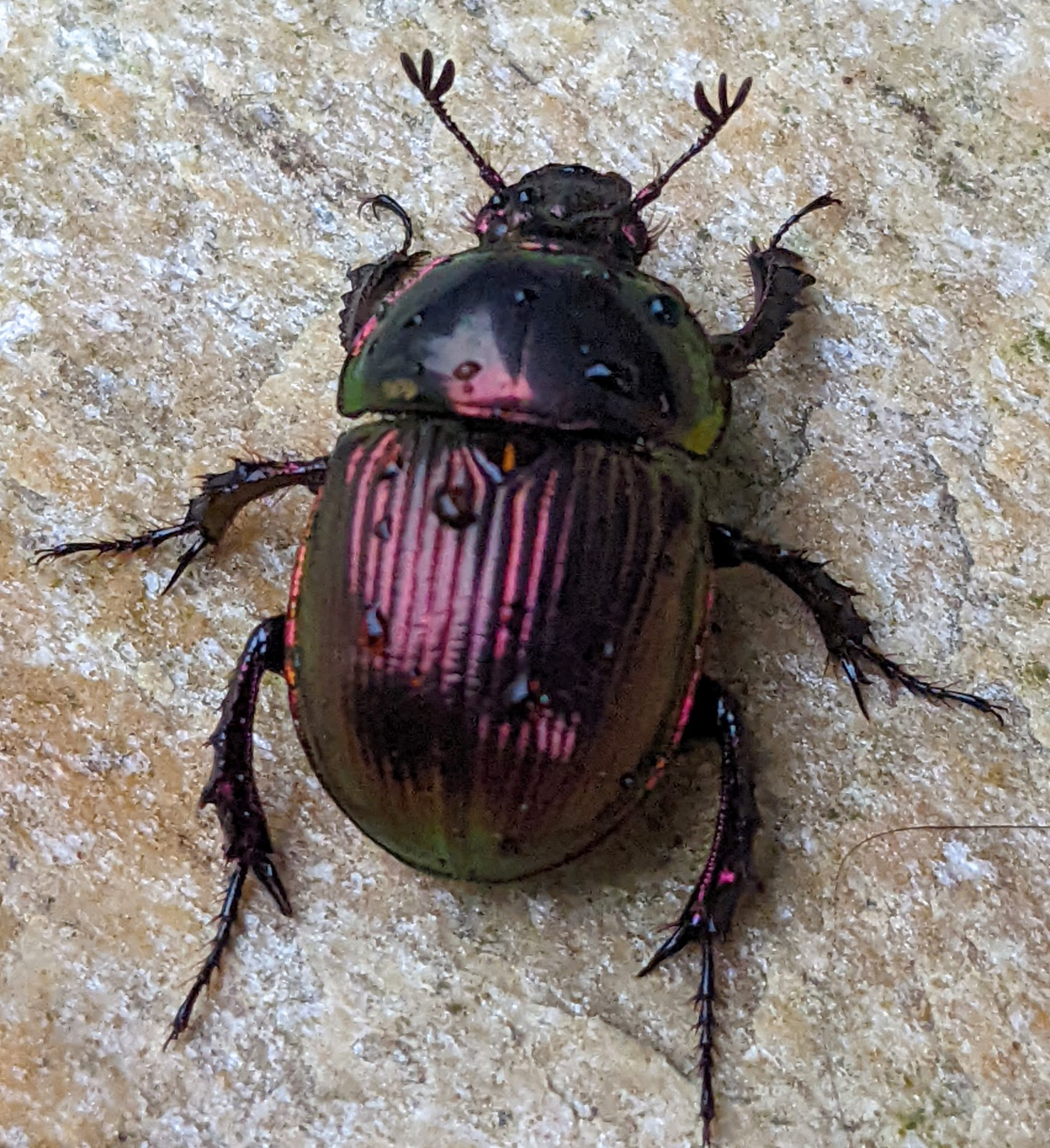

Scientific classification
- Domain: Eukaryota
- Kingdom: Animalia
- Phylum: Arthropoda
- Class: Insecta
- Order: Coleoptera
- Suborder: Polyphaga
- Infraorder: Scarabaeiformia
- Family: Geotrupidae
- Genus: Phelotrupes
- Species: P. auratus

Binomial name
- Phelotrupes auratus Motschulsky, 1857

= Phelotrupes auratus =

Species of beetle

Phelotrupes auratus is a species of beetle known by the common names Japanese earth-boring dung beetle and golden dung beetle.

== Description ==
These beetles have a body length of 15–21 mm. The body is oblong-oval shaped. The clypeus is extended forward. The longitudinal groove on the pronotum is well developed. In the male, the fore tibiae have several spines, slightly differing from each other in length. Elytra display strongly developed grooves. The color of the beetles is bright, with a strong metallic sheen ranging from golden-green to violet-purple. Antennae have 11 segments with the terminal 3 segments being flabellate.

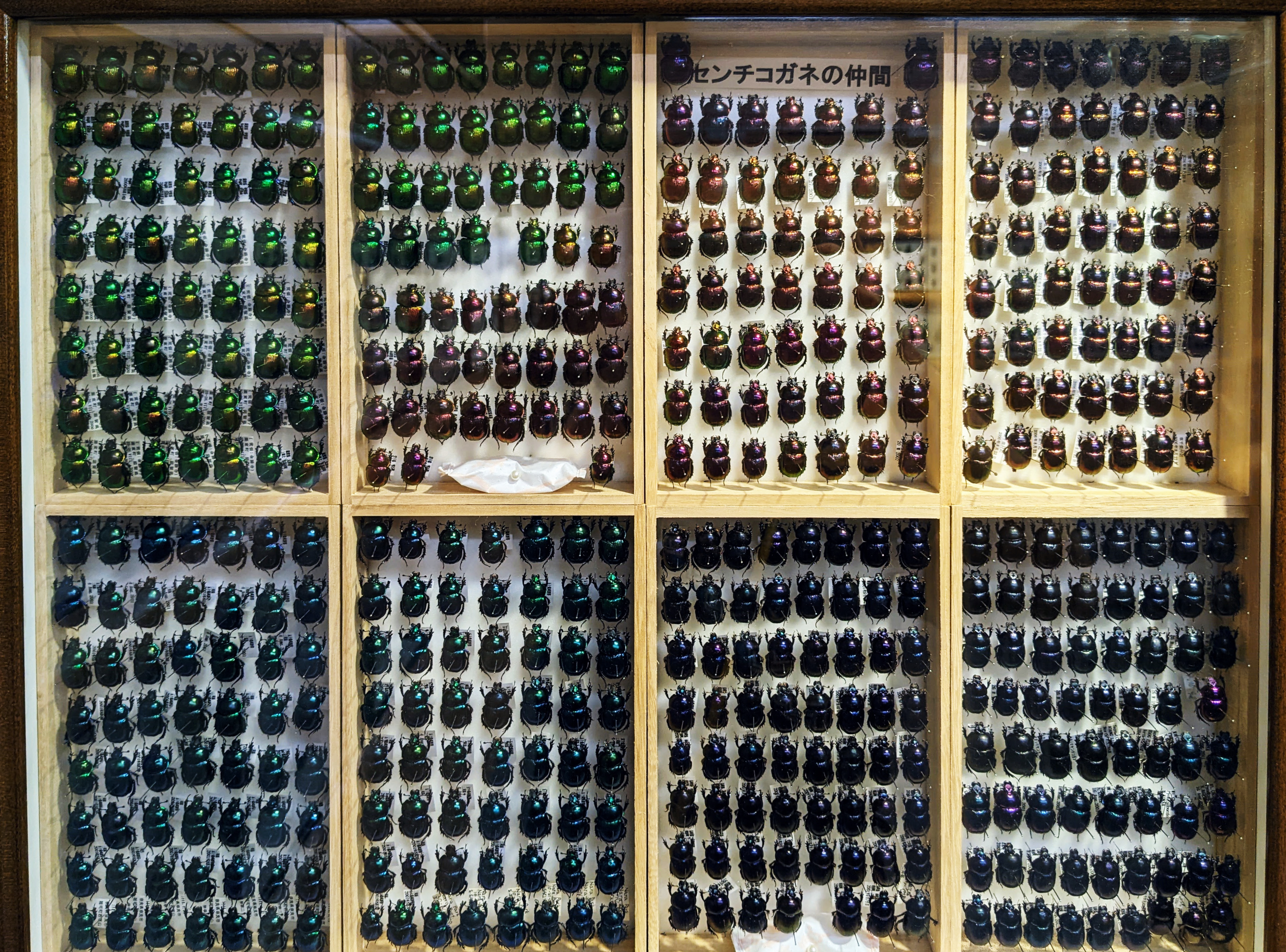
preserved specimens showing range of color.

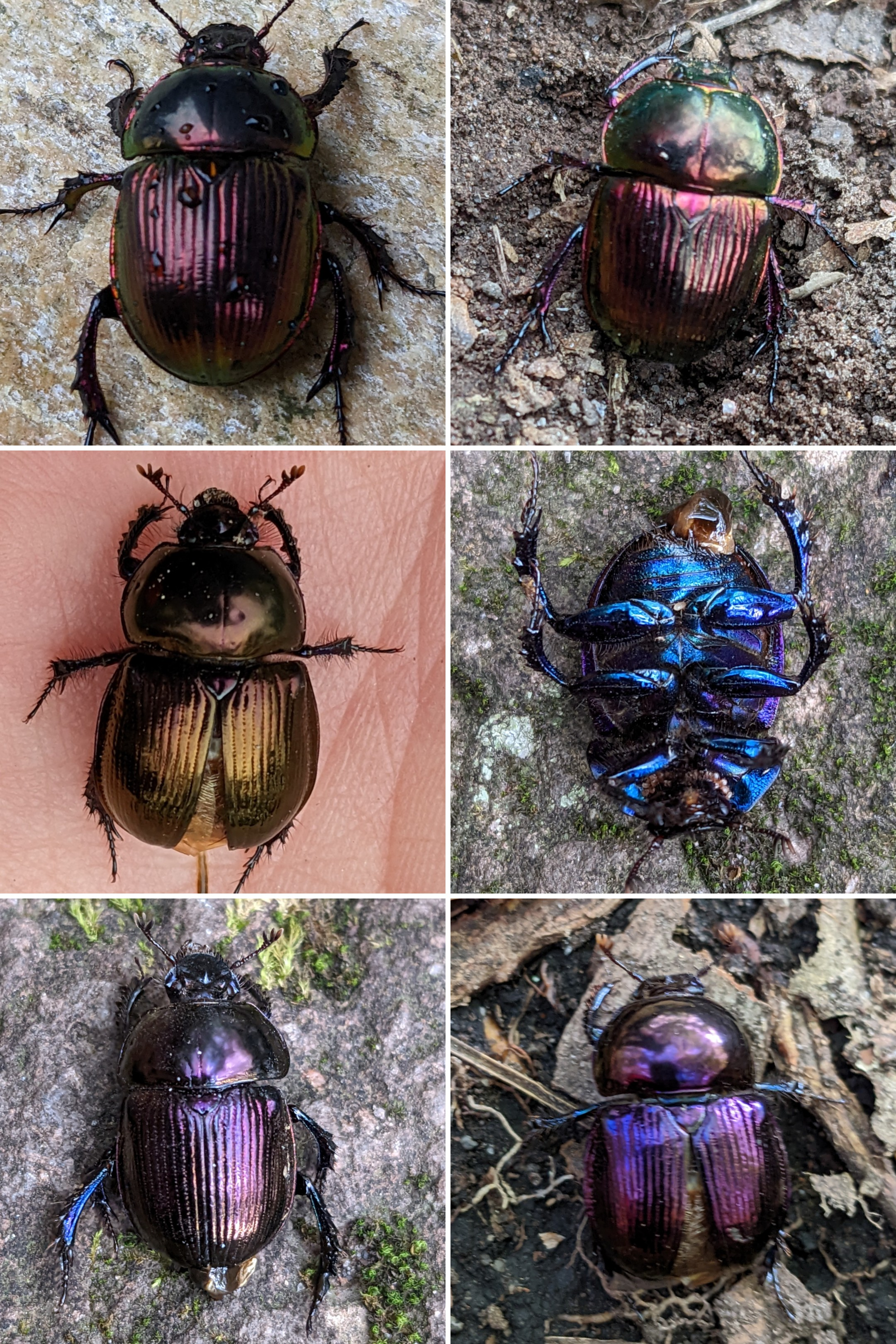

== Range ==
Phelotrupes auratus can be found in eastern China, North and South Korea and throughout Japan.

== Larva ==
The larva is similar in structure to the larvae of other members of the family Geotrupidae. Body is thick, and white or yellowish in color. The head capsule is strongly sclerotized, colored brown or dark brown. Antennae are three-segmented. The frontal suture is absent.

== Taxonomy ==
Phelotrupes auratus contains the following subspecies:

- Chromogeotrupes auratus ruri
- Phelotrupes auratus yaku
- Chromogeotrupes auratus yaku
- Chromogeotrupes auratus viridiaurea
- Phelotrupes auratus auratus
