= Peltotrupes youngi =

Scientific classification
- Kingdom: Animalia
- Phylum: Arthropoda
- Clade: Pancrustacea
- Class: Insecta
- Order: Coleoptera
- Suborder: Polyphaga
- Infraorder: Scarabaeiformia
- Family: Geotrupidae
- Genus: Peltotrupes
- Species: P. youngi

Binomial name
- Peltotrupes youngi Howden, 1955

Species of beetle

Peltotrupes youngi, known generally as Young's deep digger scarab, is a species of earth-boring scarab beetle in the family Geotrupidae. Other common names include the ocala burrowing scarab and ocala deep digger scarab beetle. It is endemic to Florida scrubs in Marion and Putnam counties in Florida.
