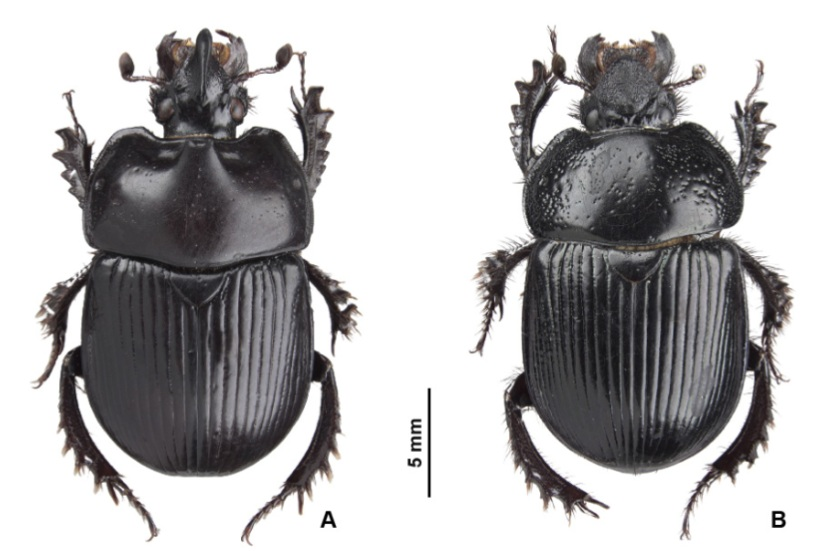

Scientific classification
- Kingdom: Animalia
- Phylum: Arthropoda
- Class: Insecta
- Order: Coleoptera
- Suborder: Polyphaga
- Infraorder: Scarabaeiformia
- Family: Geotrupidae
- Genus: Ceratotrupes
- Species: C. fronticornis

Binomial name
- Ceratotrupes fronticornis (Erichson, 1847)

Synonyms
- Geotrupes fronticornis Erichson, 1847

= Ceratotrupes fronticornis =

Species of beetle

Ceratotrupes fronticornis is a species of beetle of the family Geotrupidae. It is endemic to Mexico, where it is found in mixed pine-oak forests and meadows at altitudes between 1850 and 3000 meters. It is known from a few localities distributed across the southern Trans-Mexican Volcanic Belt, and small populations scattered across the Balsas basin. Its distribution extends westward in the northern part of the Sierra Madre Occidental. The eastern limit of its area of distribution are the southern borders of Mexico City.

== Description ==
Adults have a black body, sometimes with purplish to bluish tinges on the elytra. The antennal segments are dark brown and the antennal club is blackish to dark brown.
