= Geotrupes ulkei =

Scientific classification
- Kingdom: Animalia
- Phylum: Arthropoda
- Class: Insecta
- Order: Coleoptera
- Suborder: Polyphaga
- Infraorder: Scarabaeiformia
- Family: Geotrupidae
- Genus: Geotrupes
- Species: G. ulkei

Binomial name
- Geotrupes ulkei Blanchard, 1888

Species of beetle

Geotrupes ulkei, or Ulke's earth boring beetle, is a species of earth-boring scarab beetle in the family Geotrupidae.
