= Geotrupes semiopacus =

- G. semiopacus in Chester, New Jersey

Scientific classification
- Kingdom: Animalia
- Phylum: Arthropoda
- Clade: Pancrustacea
- Class: Insecta
- Order: Coleoptera
- Suborder: Polyphaga
- Infraorder: Scarabaeiformia
- Family: Geotrupidae
- Genus: Geotrupes
- Species: G. semiopacus

Binomial name
- Geotrupes semiopacus Jekel, 1865

Synonyms
- Geotrupes melsheimeri Jekel, 1865; Geotrupes ovalipennis Jekel, 1865

Species of beetle

Geotrupes semiopacus is a species of earth-boring scarab beetle in the family Geotrupidae.
