= Peltotrupes profundus =

Scientific classification
- Kingdom: Animalia
- Phylum: Arthropoda
- Clade: Pancrustacea
- Class: Insecta
- Order: Coleoptera
- Suborder: Polyphaga
- Infraorder: Scarabaeiformia
- Family: Geotrupidae
- Genus: Peltotrupes
- Species: P. profundus

Binomial name
- Peltotrupes profundus (Howden, 1952)

Synonyms
- Peltotrupes dubius Howden, 1955

Species of beetle

Peltotrupes profundus, the Florida deepdigger scarab, is a species of earth-boring scarab beetle in the family Geotrupidae. It is found in North America.

== Subspecies ==
These two subspecies belong to the species Peltotrupes profundus:

- Peltotrupes profundus dubius Howden, 1955
- Peltotrupes profundus profundus
