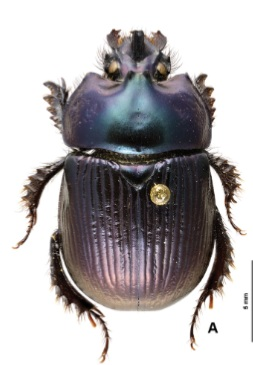
- Male
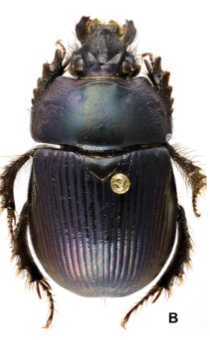
- Female

Scientific classification
- Kingdom: Animalia
- Phylum: Arthropoda
- Class: Insecta
- Order: Coleoptera
- Suborder: Polyphaga
- Infraorder: Scarabaeiformia
- Family: Geotrupidae
- Genus: Ceratotrupes
- Species: C. gonzaloi

Binomial name
- Ceratotrupes gonzaloi Arriaga-Jiménez, Zunino, Halffter, Escobar-Hernández & Rossini, 2023

= Ceratotrupes gonzaloi =

Species of beetle

Ceratotrupes gonzaloi is a species of beetle of the family Geotrupidae. It is found in Mexico, where it occurs in the Sierra Madre del Sur. It seems to be restricted to the surrounding mountains of Omiltemi, Guerrero, where it occurs exclusively in pine forest. Many of the specimens historically identified as C. sturmi in natural history collections instead belong to this new species.

== Description ==
Adults have a black body with strong purple to greenish iridescence on the pronotum and elytra. The antennal segments are brown and the antennal club is brownish.

== Etymology ==
The species is named in honour of Gonzalo Halffter (1932–2022), an entomologist.
