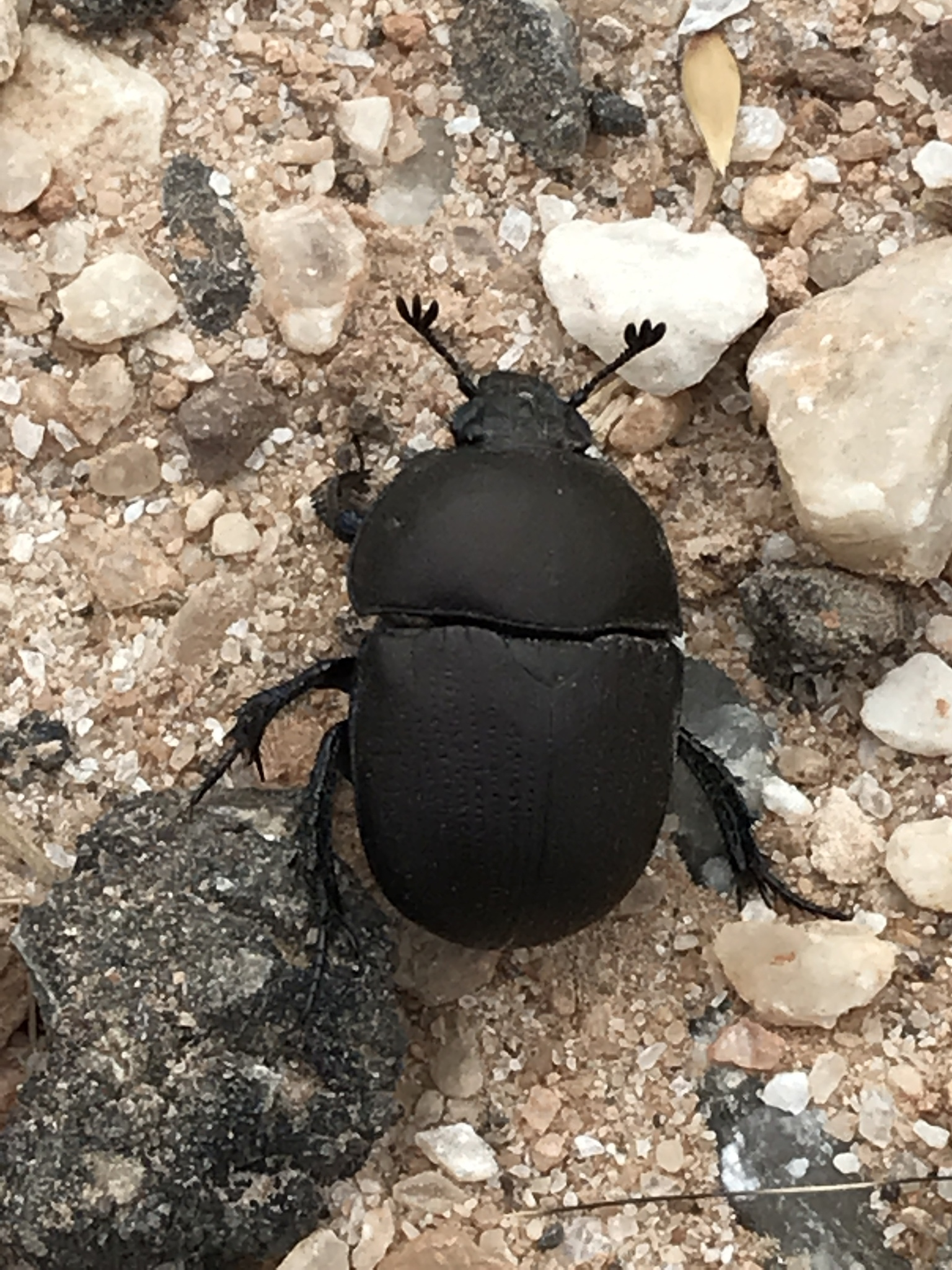

Scientific classification
- Domain: Eukaryota
- Kingdom: Animalia
- Phylum: Arthropoda
- Class: Insecta
- Order: Coleoptera
- Suborder: Polyphaga
- Infraorder: Scarabaeiformia
- Family: Geotrupidae
- Genus: Geotrupes
- Species: G. opacus

Binomial name
- Geotrupes opacus Haldeman, 1853

Synonyms
- Geotrupes chevrolati Jekel, 1865; Geotrupes haldemani Jekel, 1865

= Geotrupes opacus =

Species of beetle

Geotrupes opacus, commonly known as the opaque earth boring beetle, is a species of earth-boring scarab beetle in the family Geotrupidae.
