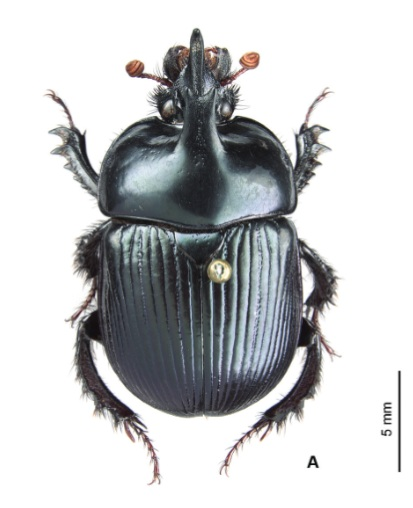
- Male
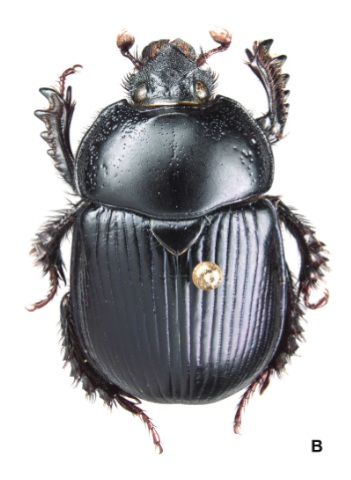
- Female

Scientific classification
- Kingdom: Animalia
- Phylum: Arthropoda
- Class: Insecta
- Order: Coleoptera
- Suborder: Polyphaga
- Infraorder: Scarabaeiformia
- Family: Geotrupidae
- Genus: Ceratotrupes
- Species: C. bolivari

Binomial name
- Ceratotrupes bolivari Halffter & Martínez, 1962

= Ceratotrupes bolivari =

Species of beetle

Ceratotrupes bolivari is a species of beetle of the family Geotrupidae. It is endemic to Mexico, where it is found in pine, oak, or mixed pine-oak forests, and open areas with alpine pastures between 900 and 3000 meters.The geographic range of this species encompasses the Sierra Madre Occidental. Its northernmost limit of distribution is located in the Mesa de Huracán with records from Yepachic, Chihuahua, while the southernmost records come from the Sierra de Tapalpa, Jalisco. To the east, the distribution of is limited by the Trans-Mexican Volcanic Belt, and specifically by the Cofre de Perote.

== Description ==
Adults have a black body, sometimes with purplish to bluish tinges near the pronotal edges, and on the elytral striation. The antennal segments are brown and the antennal club is brownish.
