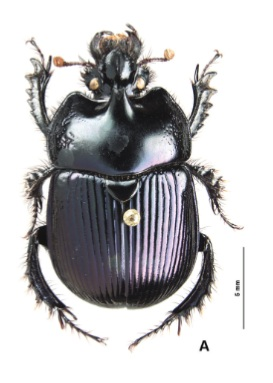
- Male
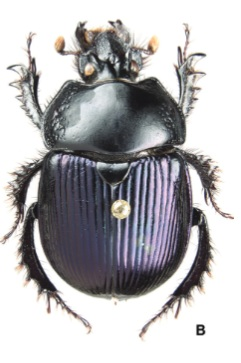
- Female

Scientific classification
- Kingdom: Animalia
- Phylum: Arthropoda
- Class: Insecta
- Order: Coleoptera
- Suborder: Polyphaga
- Infraorder: Scarabaeiformia
- Family: Geotrupidae
- Genus: Ceratotrupes
- Species: C. sturmi

Binomial name
- Ceratotrupes sturmi (Jekel, 1865)

Synonyms
- Geotrupes (Ceratotrupes) sturmii Jekel, 1865; Geotrupes (Ceratotrupes) mniszechi Jekel, 1865

= Ceratotrupes sturmi =

Species of beetle

Ceratotrupes sturmi is a species of beetle of the family Geotrupidae. It is found in Mexico (Oaxaca).

== Description ==
Adults have a black body with purple iridescence, especially on both dorsal and ventral sides. The antennal segments are brown and the antennal club is yellow.
