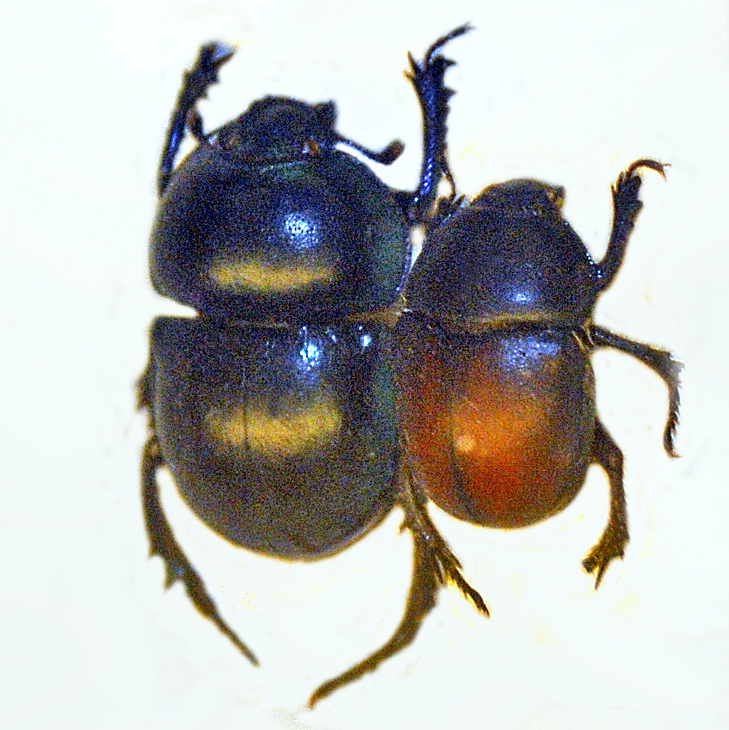
- Trypocopris pyrenaeus, museum specimen

Scientific classification
- Kingdom: Animalia
- Phylum: Arthropoda
- Class: Insecta
- Order: Coleoptera
- Suborder: Polyphaga
- Infraorder: Scarabaeiformia
- Family: Geotrupidae
- Genus: Trypocopris
- Species: T. pyrenaeus

Binomial name
- Trypocopris pyrenaeus (Charpentier, 1825)

Synonyms
- Geotrupes pyrenaeus Charpentier, 1825; Geotrupes coruscans Chevrolat, 1840; Geotrupes splendens Erichson, 1848

= Trypocopris pyrenaeus =

Species of beetle

Trypocopris pyrenaeus is a species of dor beetles.

== Subspecies ==
- Trypocopris pyrenaeus cyanicolor Capra, 1930
- Trypocopris pyrenaeus splendens Heer, 1841
- Trypocopris pyrenaeus pyrenaeus (Charpentier, 1825)

== Distribution ==
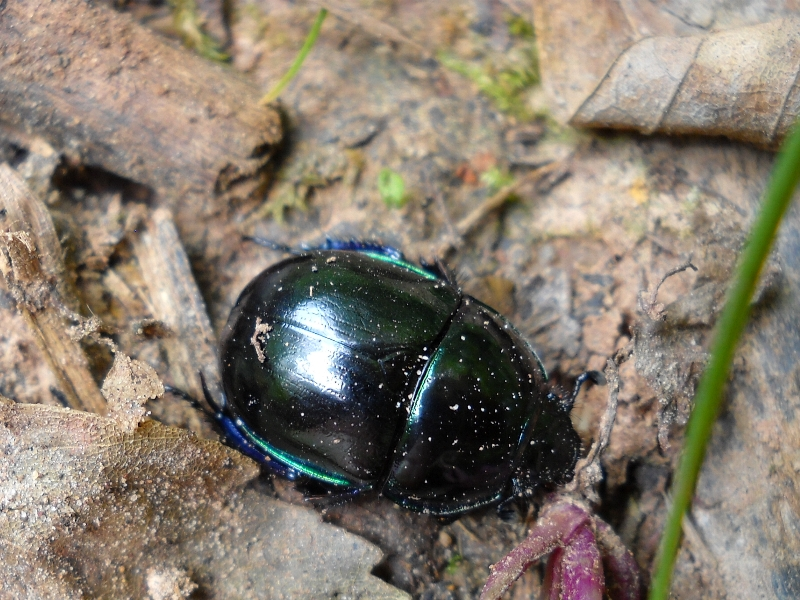
Trypocopris pyrenaeus pyrenaeus

This species is present in Andorra, British Islands, Bulgaria, France, Italy, Luxembourg, Spain and Portugal.

== Description ==
Trypocopris pyrenaeus can reach a length of 12–26 millimetres (0.47–1.02 in). These beetles are blackish, with green, blue and violet glare. The elytra are shiny and rather smooth, without any striae. The dark elytra show no infrared reflectance. The pronotum is a little punctured.

== Biology ==
Adults can be found from spring to summer. These beetles are coprophagus, occasionally mycophagous. They usually carry to the nest portions of animal droppings, on which the females will deposit the eggs.
