= Ceratophyus gopherinus =

Scientific classification
- Kingdom: Animalia
- Phylum: Arthropoda
- Class: Insecta
- Order: Coleoptera
- Suborder: Polyphaga
- Infraorder: Scarabaeiformia
- Family: Geotrupidae
- Genus: Ceratophyus
- Species: C. gopherinus

Binomial name
- Ceratophyus gopherinus Cartwright, 1966

Species of beetle

Ceratophyus gopherinus, the gopher beetle, is a species of earth-boring scarab beetle in the family Geotrupidae. It is found in North America.
