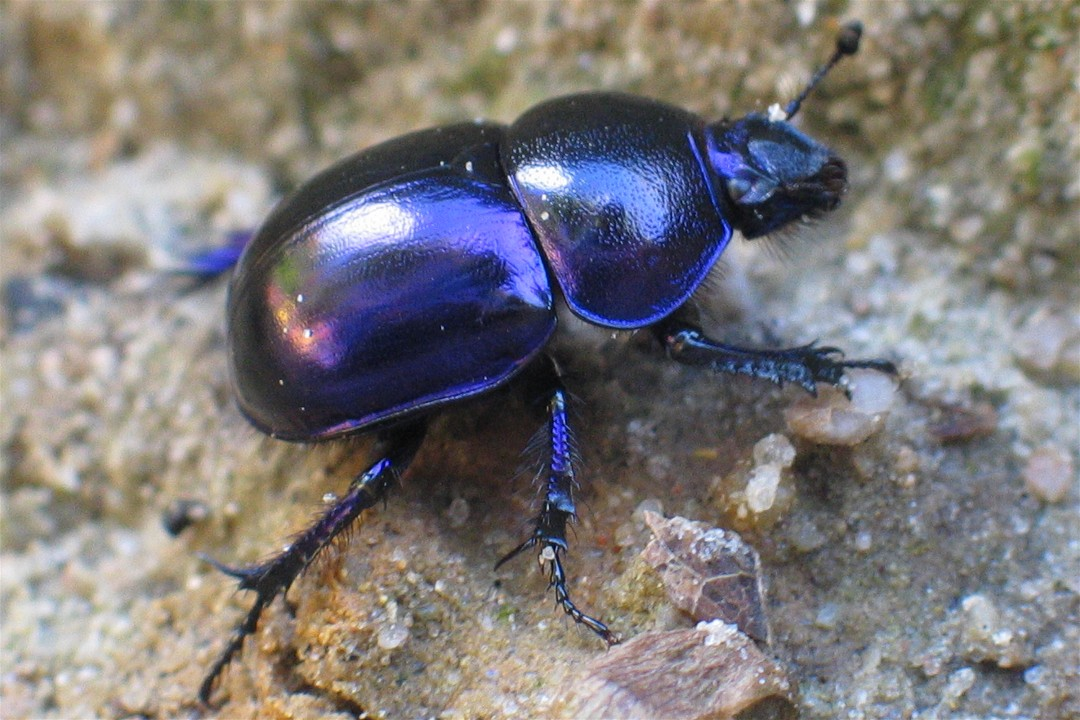

Scientific classification
- Kingdom: Animalia
- Phylum: Arthropoda
- Class: Insecta
- Order: Coleoptera
- Suborder: Polyphaga
- Infraorder: Scarabaeiformia
- Family: Geotrupidae
- Genus: Trypocopris
- Species: T. vernalis

Binomial name
- Trypocopris vernalis (Linnaeus, 1758)

Synonyms
- Geotrupes vernalis Linnaeus, 1758

= Trypocopris vernalis =

Species of beetle

Trypocopris vernalis (formerly classified in the genus Geotrupes as Geotrupes vernalis), sometimes known as the spring dor beetle, and occasionally referred to as the spring dumbledor, is a species of dung beetle in the family Geotrupidae. The beetle is black in colour and shows very low reflectance in the near-infrared part of the spectrum. The larvae feed on the dung of animals including sheep (Ovis aries) and red foxes (Vulpes vulpes).

== Distribution ==
Trypocopris vernalis is found in Europe and Asia Minor. It has been recorded as a dominant or super-dominant species of earth-boring dung beetles depending on the season, being most prevalent in spring and early summer and only rarely seen in autumn. According to Hülsmann et al., the species prefers open or semi-open areas and young woodlands.
