= Geotrupes hornii =

Scientific classification
- Kingdom: Animalia
- Phylum: Arthropoda
- Class: Insecta
- Order: Coleoptera
- Suborder: Polyphaga
- Infraorder: Scarabaeiformia
- Family: Geotrupidae
- Genus: Geotrupes
- Species: G. hornii

Binomial name
- Geotrupes hornii Blanchard, 1888

Species of beetle

Geotrupes hornii, or Horn's earth boring beetle, is a species of earth-boring scarab beetle in the family Geotrupidae. It is found in the northeastern United States and southeastern Canada, most commonly between the months of June and September, peaking in August.
