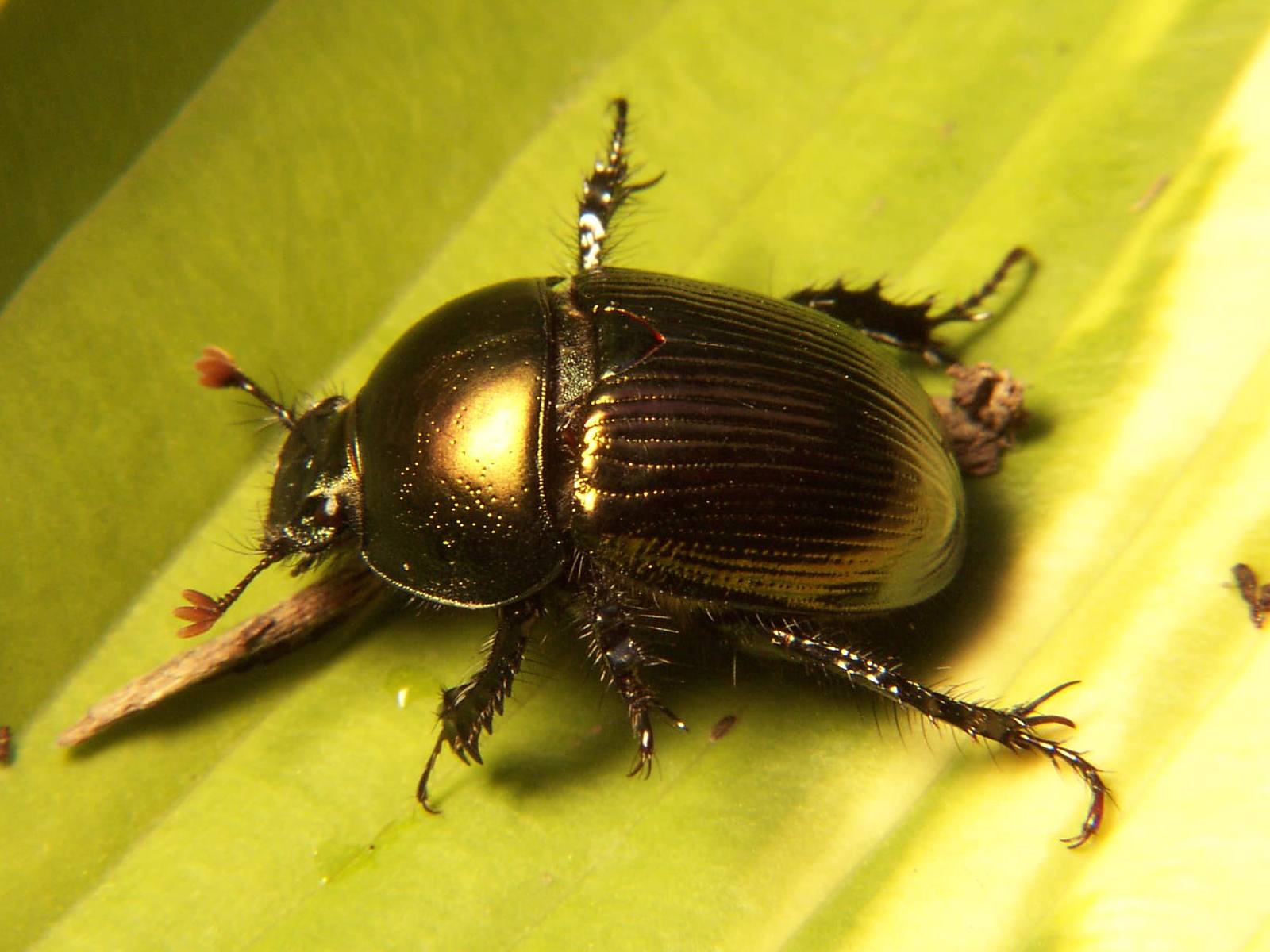

Scientific classification
- Domain: Eukaryota
- Kingdom: Animalia
- Phylum: Arthropoda
- Class: Insecta
- Order: Coleoptera
- Suborder: Polyphaga
- Infraorder: Scarabaeiformia
- Family: Geotrupidae
- Genus: Geotrupes
- Species: G. egeriei

Binomial name
- Geotrupes egeriei Germar, 1824

Synonyms
- Geotrupes lecontei Jekel, 1865

= Geotrupes egeriei =

Species of beetle

Geotrupes egeriei, or Eger's earth boring beetle, is a species of earth-boring scarab beetle in the family Geotrupidae.
