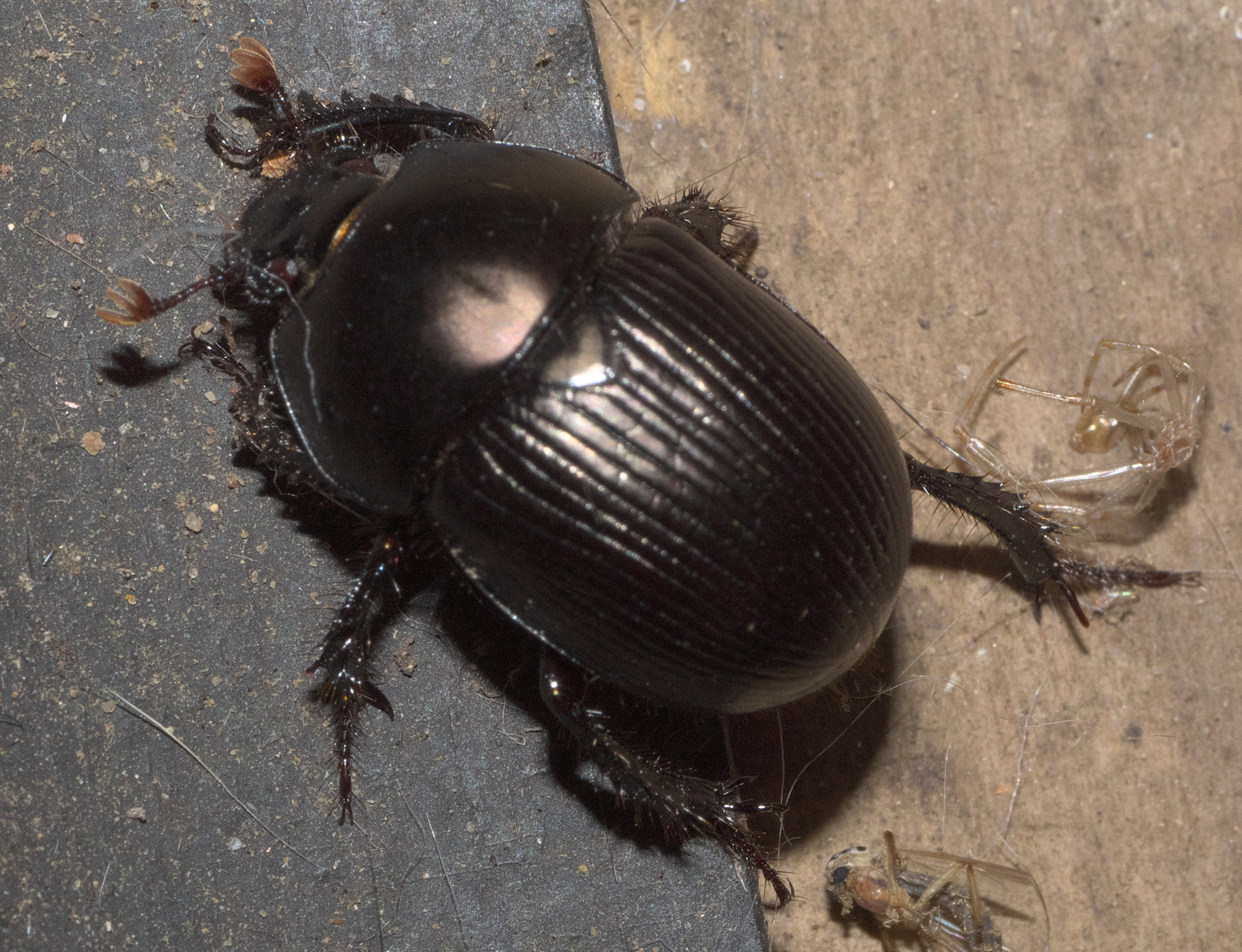

Scientific classification
- Domain: Eukaryota
- Kingdom: Animalia
- Phylum: Arthropoda
- Class: Insecta
- Order: Coleoptera
- Suborder: Polyphaga
- Infraorder: Scarabaeiformia
- Family: Geotrupidae
- Subfamily: Geotrupinae
- Genus: Geotrupes; Latreille, 1797

Synonyms
- Melanotrupes Blanchard, 1888

= Geotrupes =

Genus of beetles

Geotrupes (from Greek 'earth-boring') is a genus of earth-boring scarab beetles in the family Geotrupidae. There are at least 30 described species in Geotrupes.

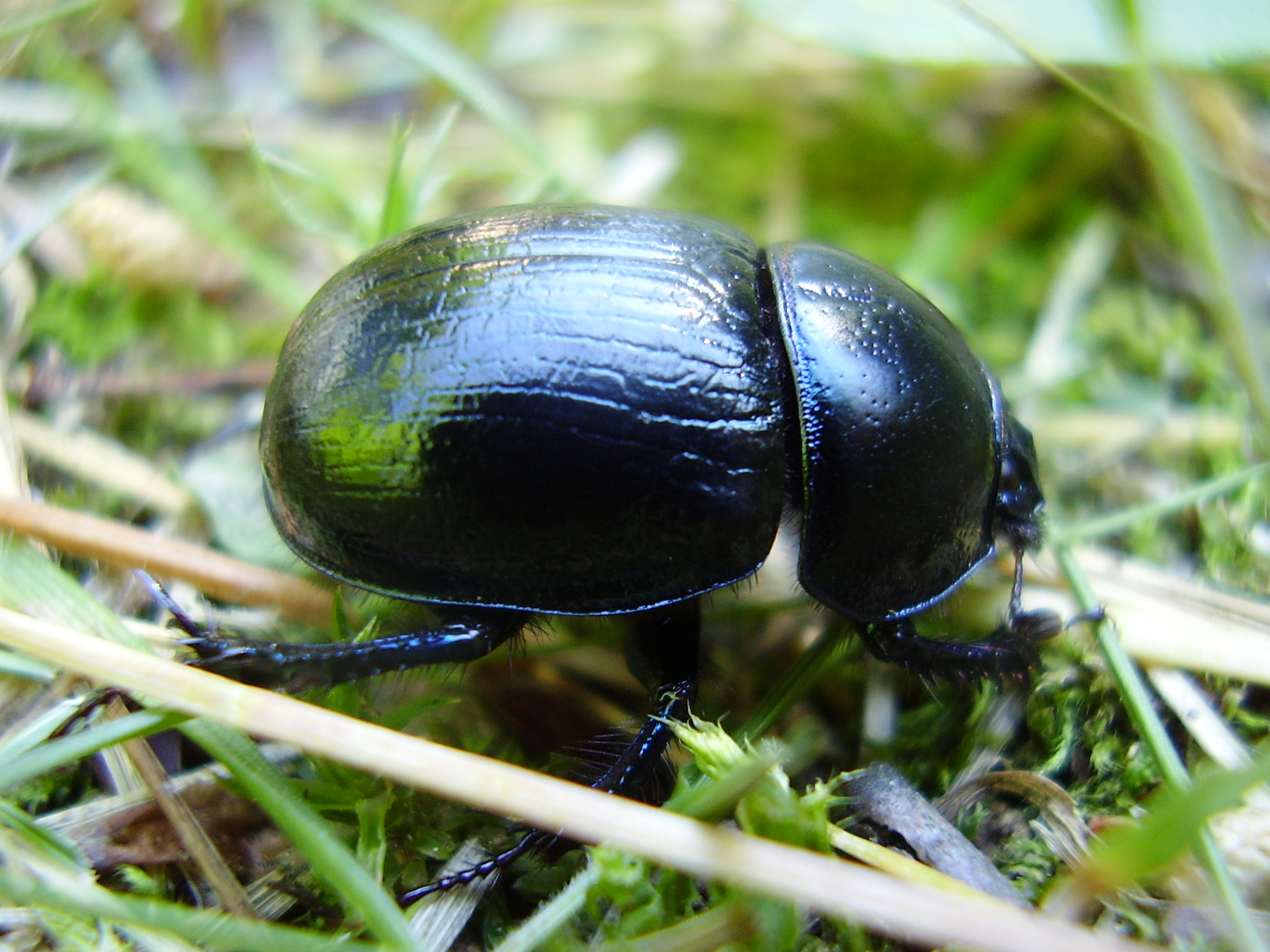
Geotrupes stercorarius

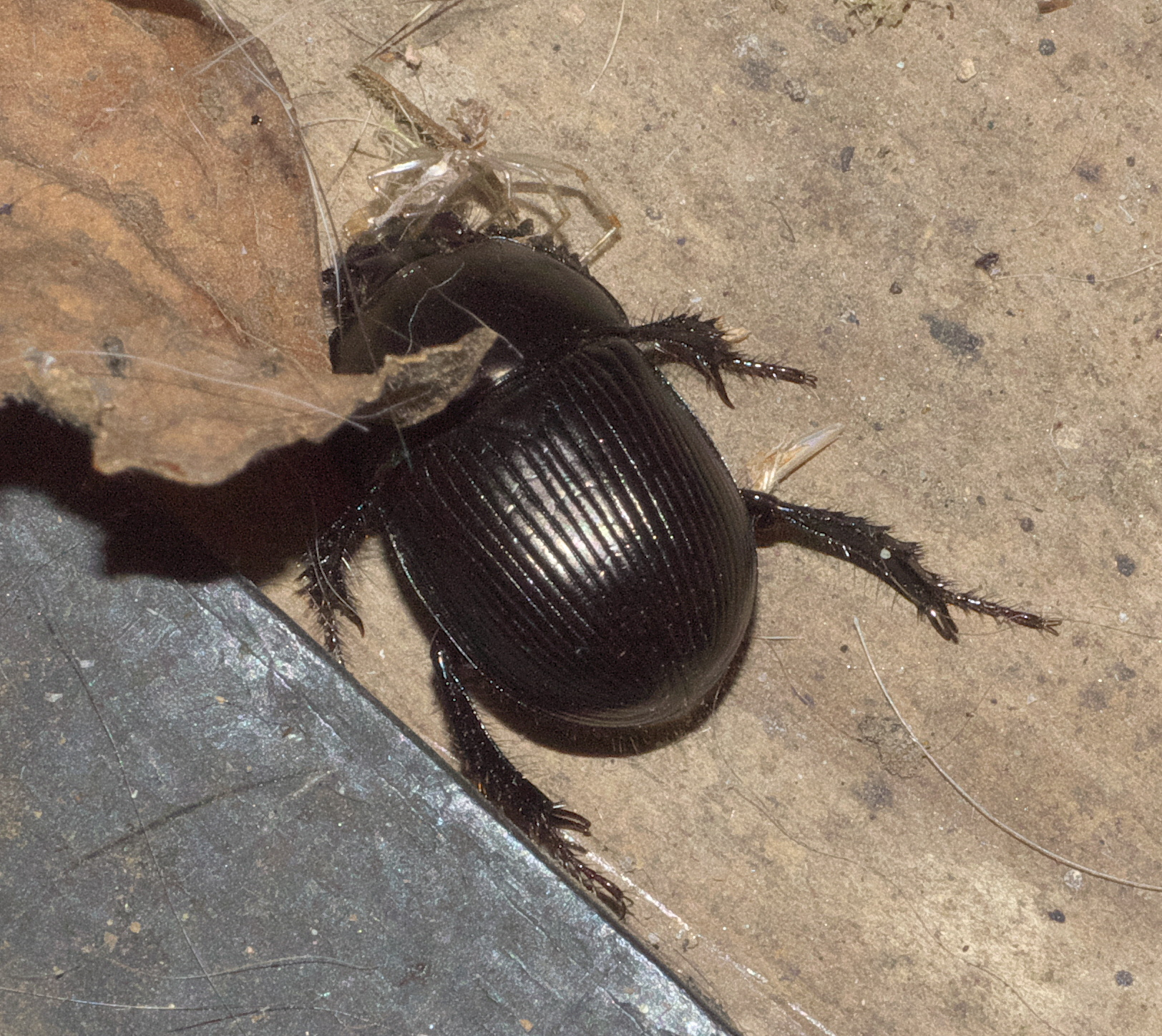

== Species ==
These 31 species belong to the genus Geotrupes:

- Geotrupes atavus Oustalet, 1874^{c g}
- Geotrupes baicalicus Reitter, 1892^{c g}
- Geotrupes balyi Jekel, 1865^{i g b} (Baly's earth boring beetle)
- Geotrupes blackburnii (Fabricius, 1781)^{i b} (Blackburn's earth boring beetle)
- Geotrupes cavicollis Bates, 1887^{i}
- Geotrupes corinthius Fairmaire, 1886^{c g}
- Geotrupes douei Gory, 1841^{c g}
- Geotrupes egeriei Germar, 1824^{i b} (Eger's earth boring beetle)
- Geotrupes folwarcznyi Cervenka, 2005^{c g}
- Geotrupes genestieri Boucomont, 1904^{c g}
- Geotrupes germari Heer, 1862^{c g}
- Geotrupes hornii Blanchard, 1888^{i g b} (Horn's earth boring beetle)
- Geotrupes ibericus Baraud, 1958^{c g}
- Geotrupes jakowlewi (Semenov, 1891)^{c}
- Geotrupes kashmirensis Sharp, 1878^{c g}
- Geotrupes koltzei Reitter, 1892^{c g}
- Geotrupes lenardoi Petrovitz, 1973^{c g}
- Geotrupes meridionalis (Palisot De Beauvois, 1805)^{c g}
- Geotrupes messelensis Meunier, 1921^{c g}
- Geotrupes mutator (Marsham, 1802)^{c g}
- Geotrupes olgae Olsoufieff, 1918^{c g}
- Geotrupes opacus Haldeman, 1853^{i b} (opaque earth boring beetle)
- Geotrupes rottensis Statz, 1952^{c g}
- Geotrupes semiopacus Jekel, 1865^{i b}
- Geotrupes spiniger (Marsham, 1802)^{c g}
- Geotrupes splendidulus (Fabricius, 1775)^{i g}
- Geotrupes splendidus^{g b} (splendid earth boring beetle)
- Geotrupes stercorarius (Linnaeus, 1758)^{i c g b} (dor beetle)
- Geotrupes thoracinus (Palisot De Beauvois, 1805)^{c g}
- Geotrupes ulkei Blanchard, 1888^{i g b} (Ulke's earth boring beetle)
- Geotrupes vetustus Germar, 1837^{c g}

Data sources: i = ITIS, c = Catalogue of Life, g = GBIF, b = Bugguide.net
