= Peltotrupes =

Scientific classification
- Kingdom: Animalia
- Phylum: Arthropoda
- Class: Insecta
- Order: Coleoptera
- Suborder: Polyphaga
- Infraorder: Scarabaeiformia
- Family: Geotrupidae
- Subfamily: Geotrupinae
- Genus: Peltotrupes; Blanchard, 1888

Genus of beetles

Peltotrupes is a genus of earth-boring scarab beetles in the family Geotrupidae. There are at least two described species in Peltotrupes.

== Species ==
These two species belong to the genus Peltotrupes:

- Peltotrupes profundus (Howden, 1952) (Florida deepdigger scarab)
- Peltotrupes youngi Howden, 1955 (Young's deepdigger scarab)
