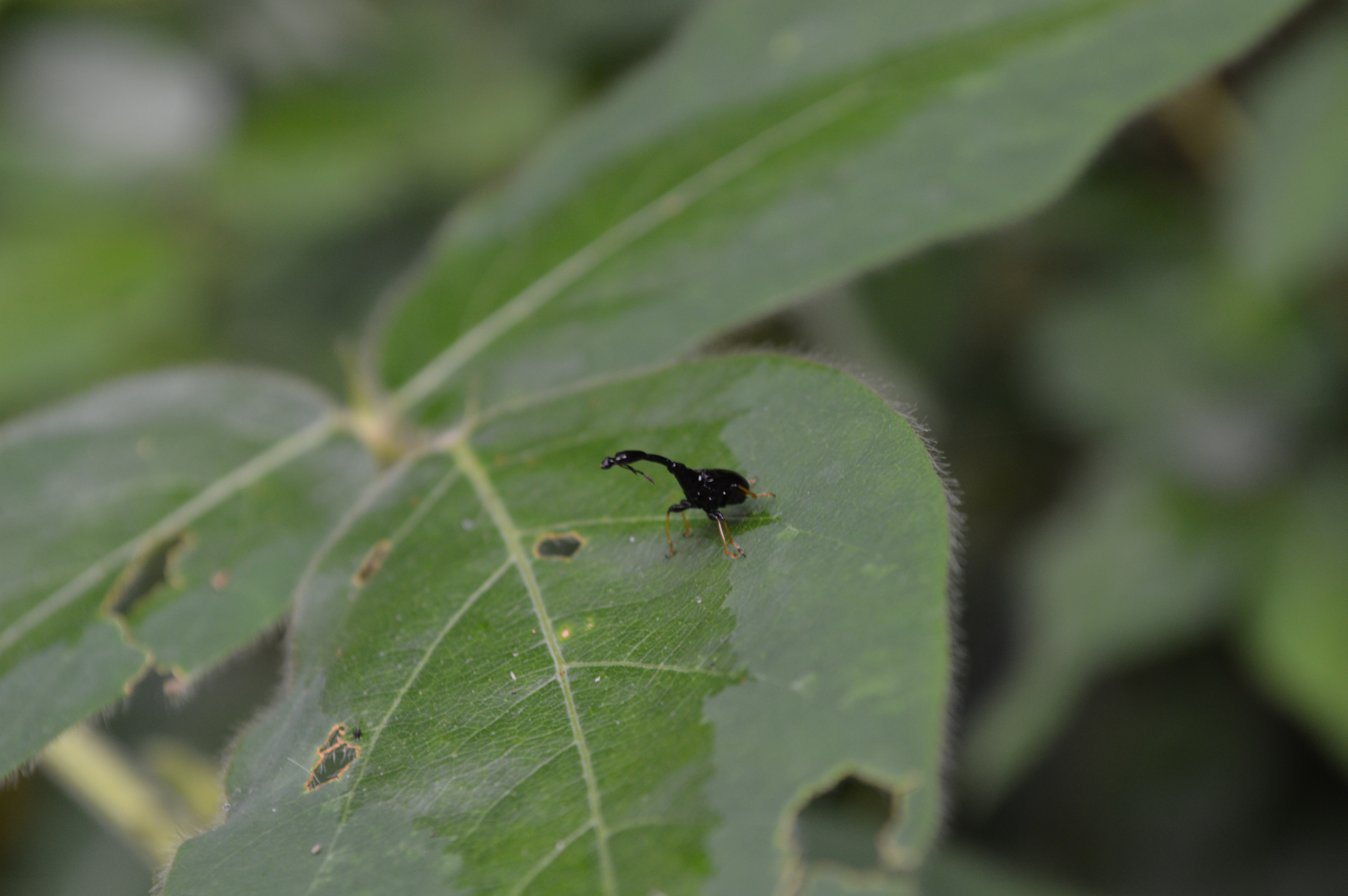
- Adult, Ranomafana National Park, Madagascar

Scientific classification
- Kingdom: Animalia
- Phylum: Arthropoda
- Class: Insecta
- Order: Coleoptera
- Suborder: Polyphaga
- Infraorder: Cucujiformia
- Family: Attelabidae
- Genus: Trachelophorus
- Species: T. madegassus

Binomial name
- Trachelophorus madegassus Voss, 1929

= Trachelophorus madegassus =

Species of beetle

Trachelophorus madegassus is a species of weevil in the family Attelabidae. It is indigenous to Madagascar.
