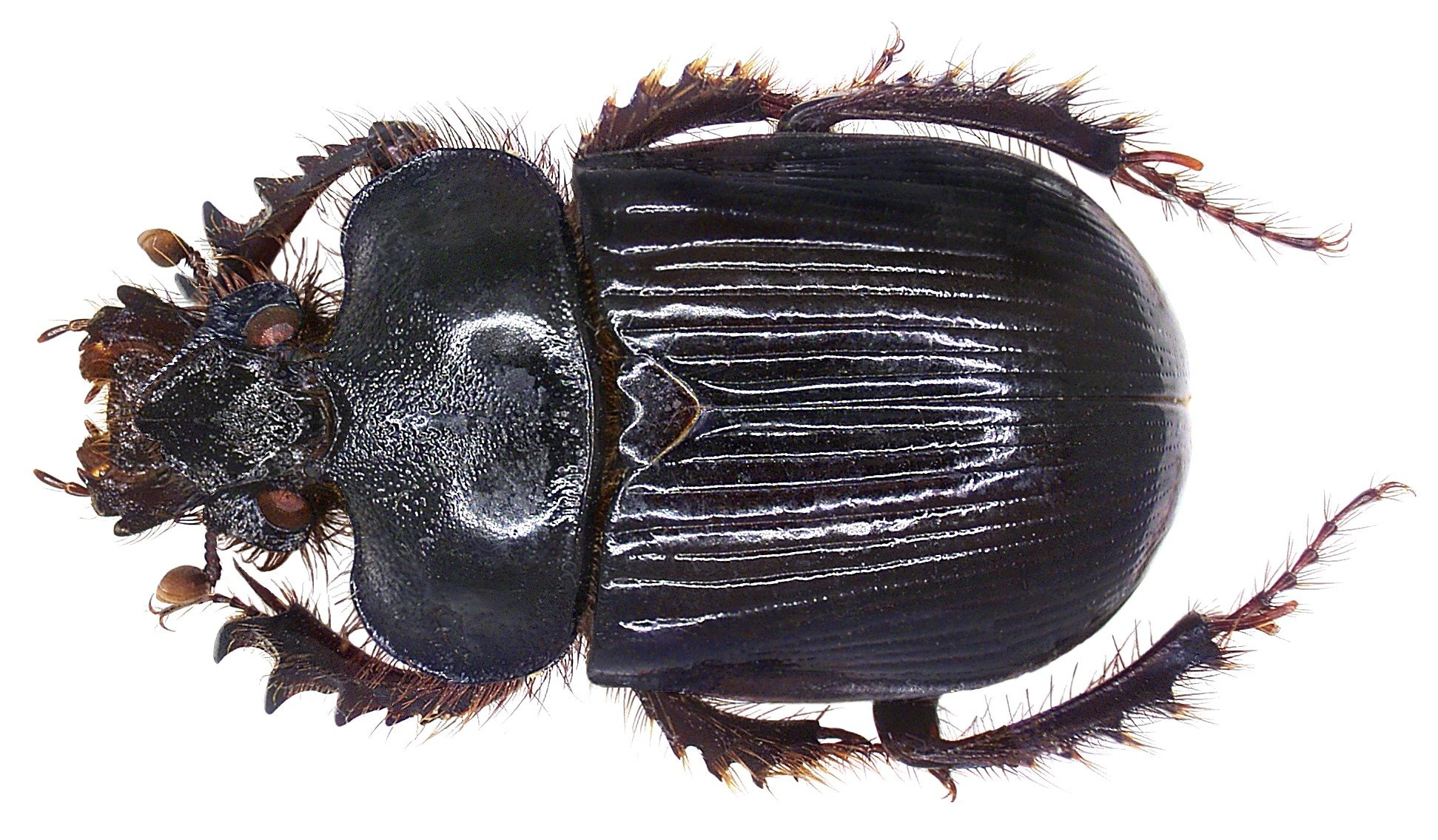
- Ceratophyus hoffmannseggi

Scientific classification
- Kingdom: Animalia
- Phylum: Arthropoda
- Clade: Pancrustacea
- Class: Insecta
- Order: Coleoptera
- Suborder: Polyphaga
- Infraorder: Scarabaeiformia
- Family: Geotrupidae
- Subfamily: Geotrupinae
- Genus: Ceratophyus; Fischer von Waldheim, 1823

= Ceratophyus =

Genus of beetles

Ceratophyus is a genus of earth-boring scarab beetles in the family Geotrupidae. There are about 13 described species in Ceratophyus.

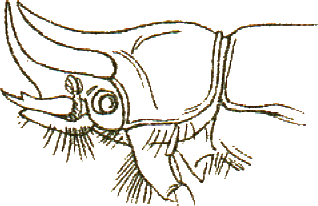
Ceratophyus polyceros

== Species ==
These 13 species belong to the genus Ceratophyus:

- Ceratophyus alloini Prunier, Tauzin & Rosset, 2016
- Ceratophyus dauricus (Jekel, 1865)
- Ceratophyus gopherinus Cartwright, 1966 (gopher beetle)
- Ceratophyus hoffmannseggi (Fairmaire, 1856)
- Ceratophyus kabaki Nikolajev, 2007
- Ceratophyus maghrebinicus Hillert & Kral, 2013
- Ceratophyus martinezi Lauffer, 1909
- Ceratophyus mesasiaticus Medvedev & Nikolajev, 1974
- Ceratophyus polyceros (Pallas, 1771)
- Ceratophyus poncini Boilly & Hillert, 2023
- Ceratophyus rossii (Jekel, 1865)
- Ceratophyus schaffrathi Hillert & Kral, 2013
- Ceratophyus sinicus Zunino, 1973
- Ceratophyus sulcicornis (Fairmaire, 1887)
- †Ceratophyus yatagaii
