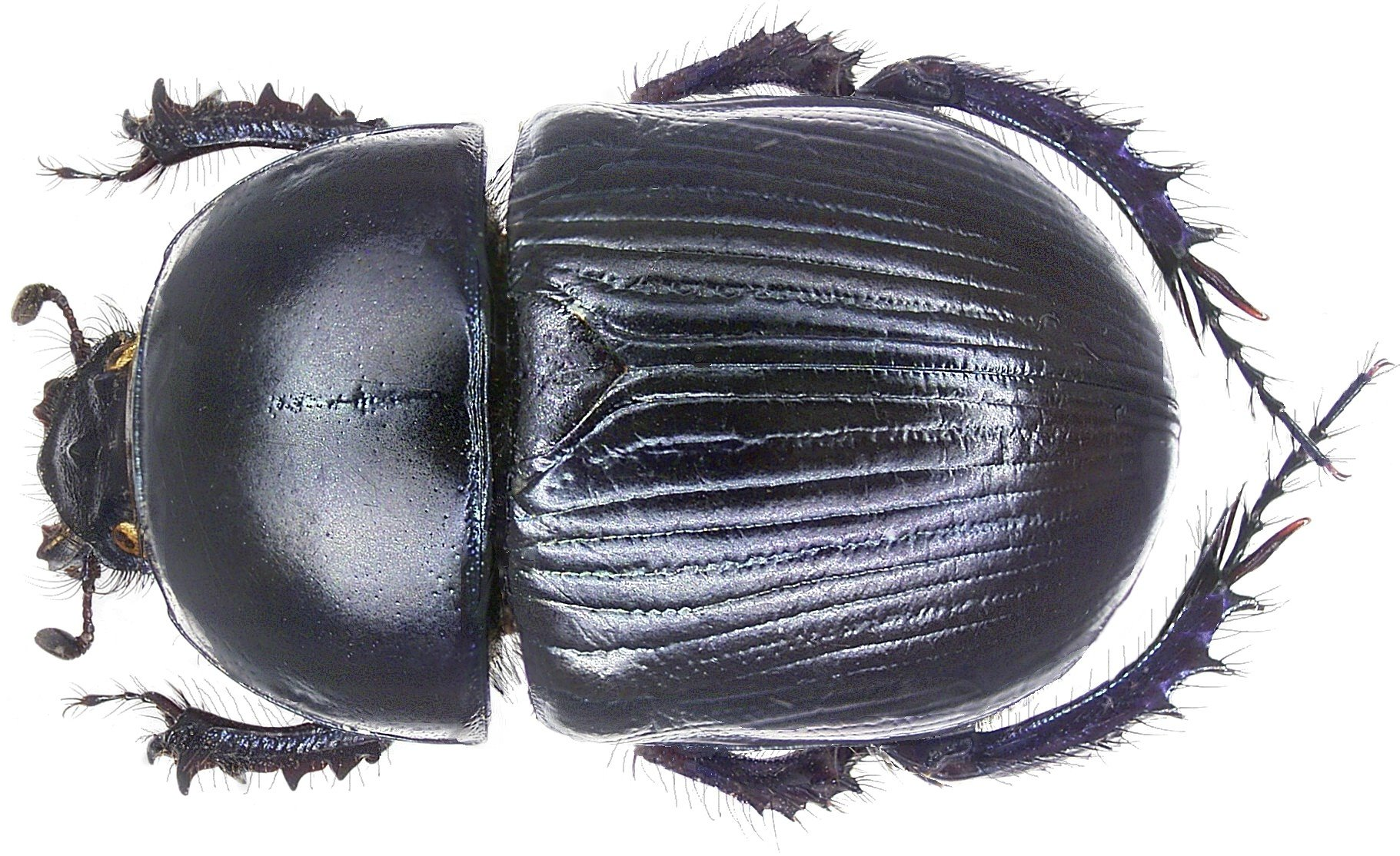
- Geotrupes spiniger 18-26 mm.

Scientific classification
- Domain: Eukaryota
- Kingdom: Animalia
- Phylum: Arthropoda
- Class: Insecta
- Order: Coleoptera
- Suborder: Polyphaga
- Infraorder: Scarabaeiformia
- Family: Geotrupidae
- Genus: Geotrupes
- Species: G. spiniger

Binomial name
- Geotrupes spiniger (Marsham, 1802)

= Geotrupes spiniger =

Species of beetle

Geotrupes spiniger is a species of earth-boring dung beetles native to Europe.
