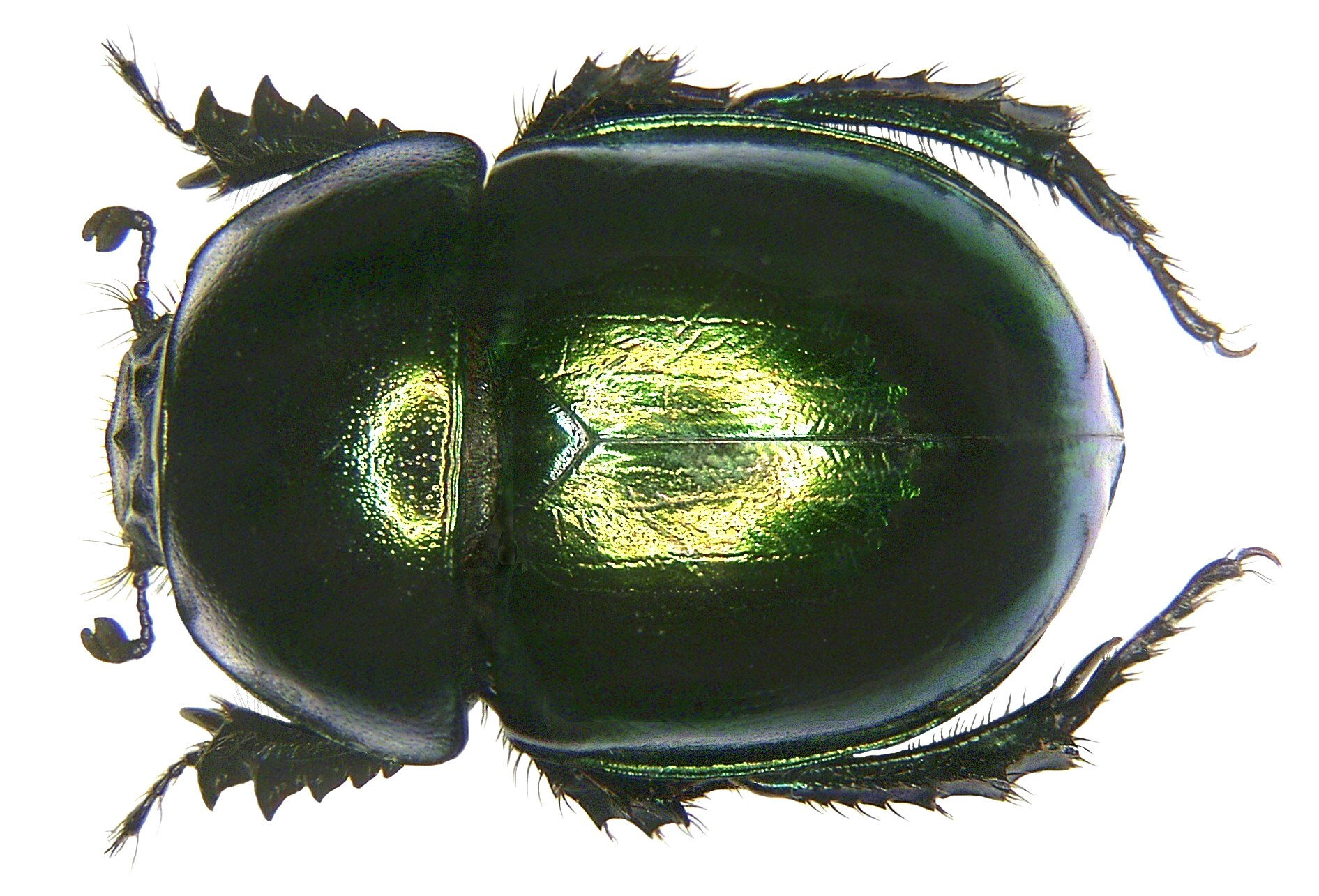
- Trypocopris vernalis

Scientific classification
- Kingdom: Animalia
- Phylum: Arthropoda
- Class: Insecta
- Order: Coleoptera
- Suborder: Polyphaga
- Infraorder: Scarabaeiformia
- Family: Geotrupidae
- Subfamily: Geotrupinae
- Tribe: Geotrupini
- Genus: Trypocopris; Motschulsky, 1859

= Trypocopris =

Genus of beetles

Trypocopris is a genus of earth-boring dung beetles.

== Species ==
- Trypocopris alpinus (Sturm & Hagenbach, 1825)
- Trypocopris amedei (Fairmaire, 1861)
- Trypocopris fulgidus (Motschulsky, 1845)
- Trypocopris inermis (Ménétriés, 1832)
- Trypocopris pyrenaeus (Charpentier, 1825)
- Trypocopris vernalis (Linnaeus, 1758)
- Trypocopris zaitzevi (Olsoufieff, 1918)
