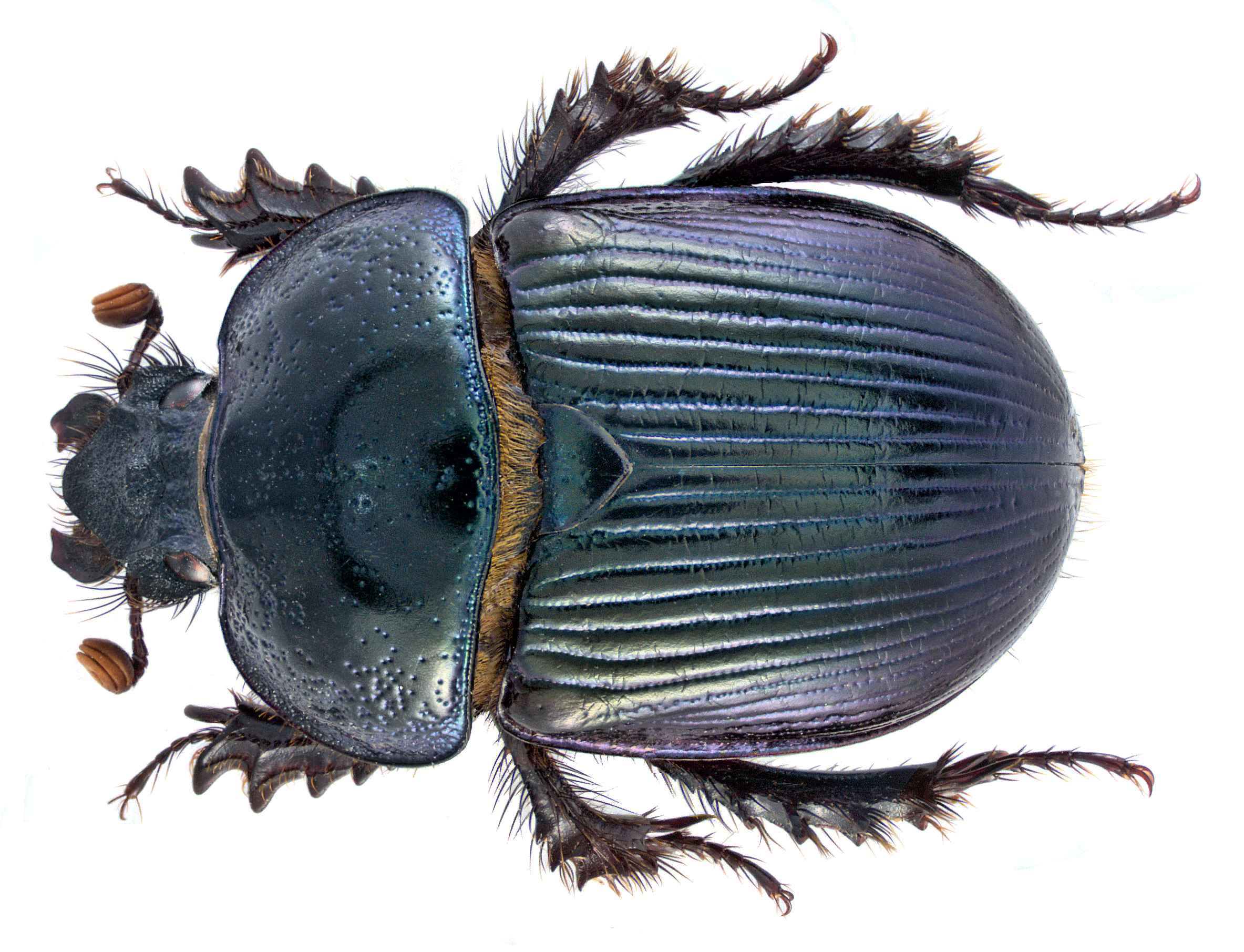
- Ceratotrupes bolivari

Scientific classification
- Kingdom: Animalia
- Phylum: Arthropoda
- Class: Insecta
- Order: Coleoptera
- Suborder: Polyphaga
- Infraorder: Scarabaeiformia
- Family: Geotrupidae
- Tribe: Ceratotrupini
- Genus: Ceratotrupes; Jekel, 1865

= Ceratotrupes =

Genus of beetles

Ceratotrupes is a genus of earth-boring scarab beetles in the family Geotrupidae.

== Species ==
- Ceratotrupes fronticornis (Erichson, 1847)
- Ceratotrupes gonzaloi Arriaga-Jiménez, Zunino, Halffter, Escobar-Hernández & Rossini, 2023
- Ceratotrupes bolivari Halffter & Martínez, 1962
- Ceratotrupes sturmi (Jekel, 1865)
