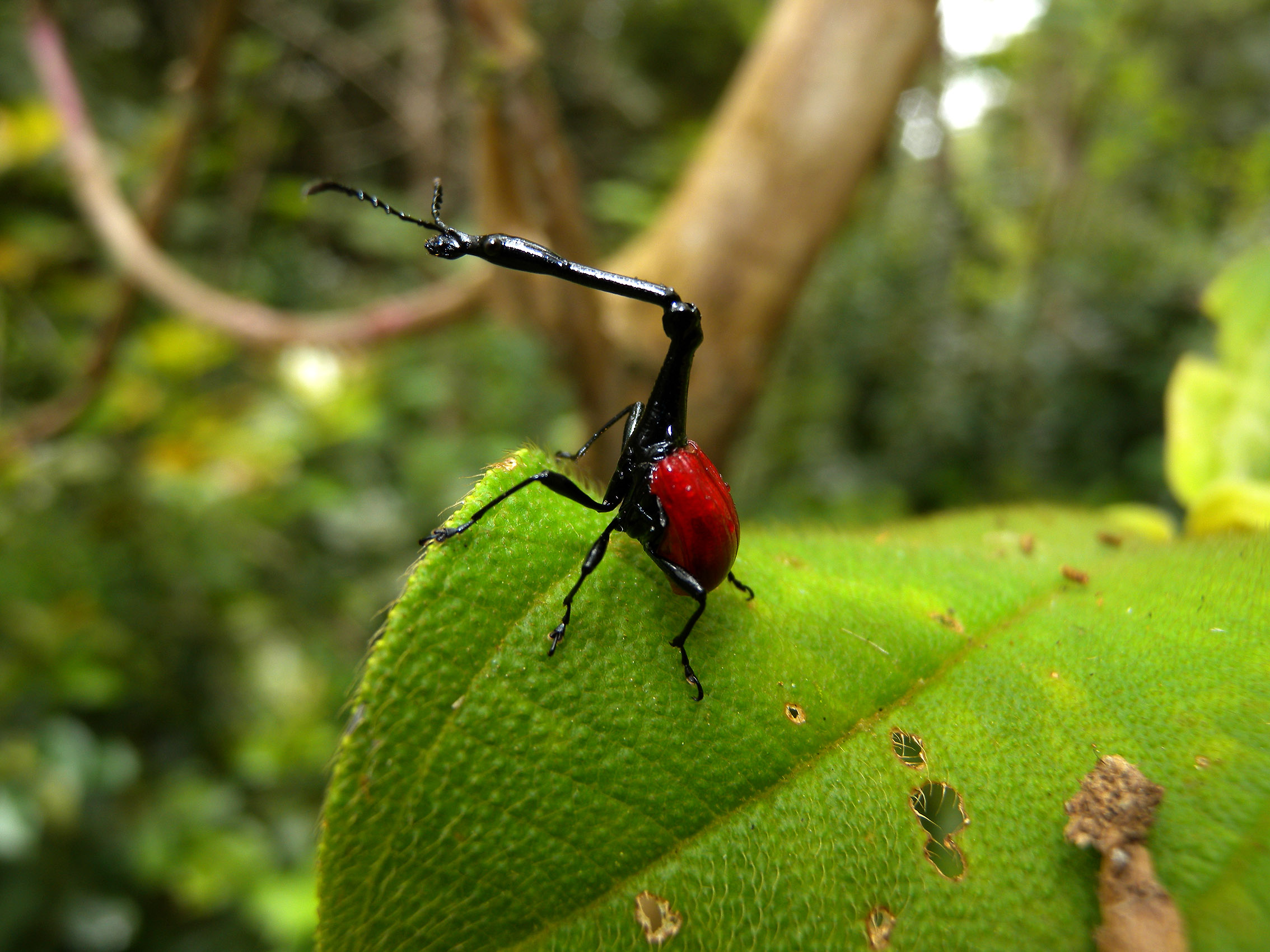
- Trachelophorus giraffa

Scientific classification
- Kingdom: Animalia
- Phylum: Arthropoda
- Clade: Pancrustacea
- Class: Insecta
- Order: Coleoptera
- Suborder: Polyphaga
- Infraorder: Cucujiformia
- Superfamily: Curculionoidea
- Family: Attelabidae
- Genus: Trachelophorus; Jekel, 1860

Species
- See text

Synonyms
- Atrachelophoridius Legalov, 2007; Atrachelophorus Legalov, 2007; Eotrachelophorus Legalov, 2003; Nigrotrachelophorus Legalov, 2003

= Trachelophorus =

Genus of beetles

Trachelophorus is a genus of weevils in the leaf-rolling weevil family Attelabidae.

Several species are known as giraffe weevils because of their elongated "necks". The best known species is Trachelophorus giraffa.

Species include:

- Trachelophorus abdominalis Legalov, 2007
- Trachelophorus ardea Legalov, 2003
- Trachelophorus ater Faust, 1890
- Trachelophorus camelus Legalov, 2003
- Trachelophorus castaneus Legalov, 2003
- Trachelophorus dromas Legalov, 2003
- Trachelophorus elegans Voss, 1929
- Trachelophorus fausti Voss, 1929
- Trachelophorus foveicollis Fairm., 1902
- Trachelophorus giraffa Voss, 1929
- Trachelophorus giraffoides Voss, 1929
- Trachelophorus humeralis (Olivier, 1807)
- Trachelophorus limbatus Voss, 1929
- Trachelophorus madegassus Legalov, 2003
- Trachelophorus michaelis Hustache, 1956
- Trachelophorus numeralis Voss, 1929
- Trachelophorus pygmaeus Voss, 1929
- Trachelophorus rubrodorsatus Voss, 1929
- Trachelophorus sicardi Hustache, 1933
- Trachelophorus signatus Voss, 1929
- Trachelophorus uniformis Legalov, 2003
