= Henri Jekel =

French entomologist

Henri Jekel (September 21, 1816, Paris - August 4, 1891) was a French coleopterist.

== Life and work ==
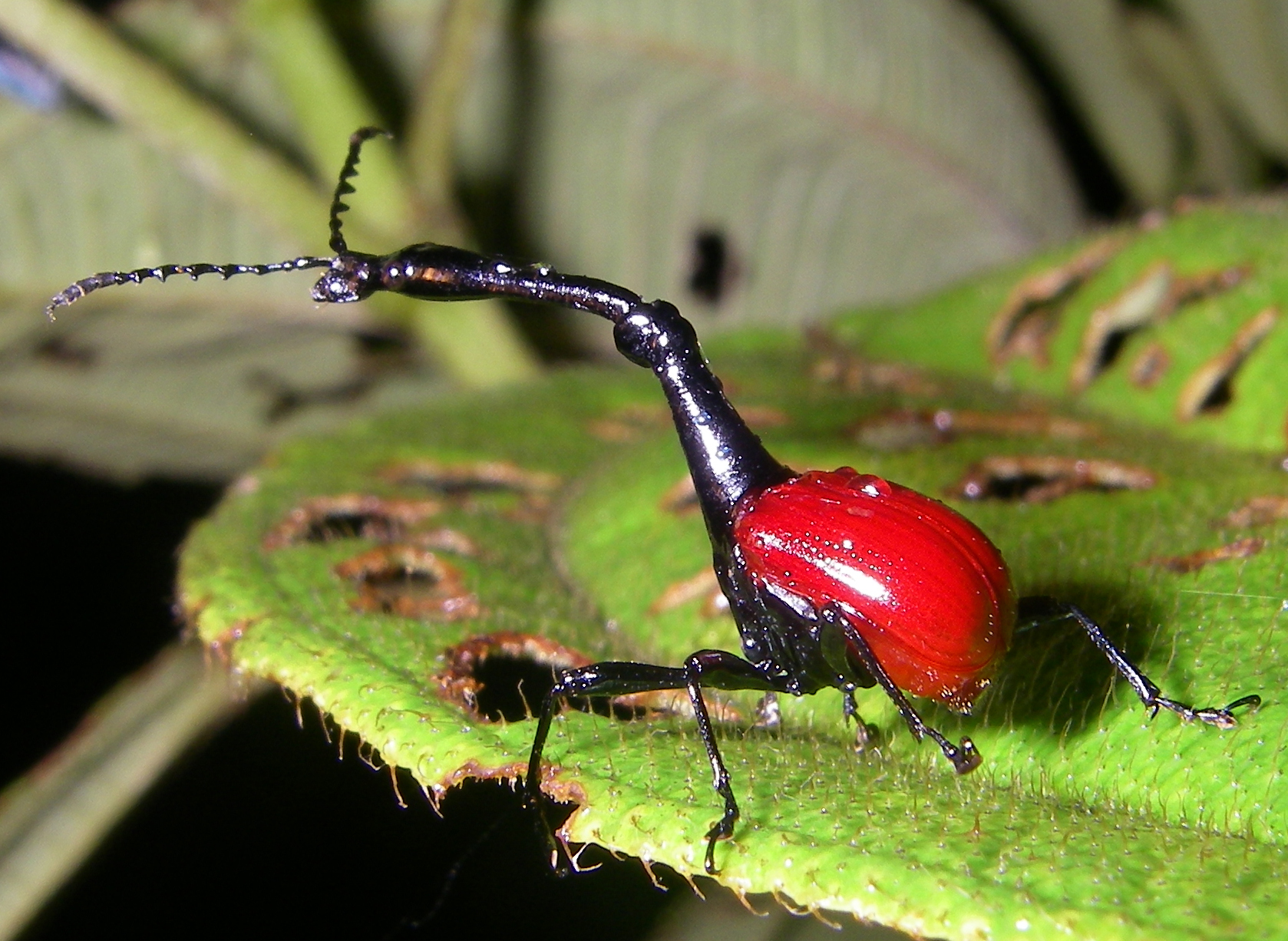
male giraffe weevil

Jekel ran a natural history items and books store in Paris. In 1849 he wrote a revision of the work Genera et species Curculionidarum by the Swedish entomologist Carl Johan Schönherr. From 1854 to 1859 he self-published the three-volume work Fabricia entomologica. In the following years he wrote a large number of specialist articles for various journals of entomological societies, including the first description of the giraffe neck beetle from Madagascar in 1860. In total, Jekel described over 550 taxa, 367 of which are still valid today. These include genera and species from the beetle families Anthribidae, Attelabidae, Curculionidae and Geotrupidae. Genera described are Lasiorhynchites, Conothorax, Chelotrupes, Balanobius, Donus, Eudmetus, Elytroxys and Entomops.

In 1855 he published the first part of Insecta Saundersiana or characters of undescribed insects in the collection of William Wilson Saunders and in 1860 the second part appeared under the title Insecta Saundersiana: Or, Characters of Undescribed Insects in the Collection of William Wilson Saunders, FRS, FLS Coleoptera - Curculionides both volumes being based on the collections of British entomologist William Wilson Saunders. Jekel was an avid collector of beetles, particularly scarab beetles and weevils. In 1873 and 1875 he published two volumes of his work Coleoptera Jekeliana, adjecta Eleutheratorum Bibliotheca. In 1879 he sold his personal collection to his competitors Henri Deyrolle and Henri Donckier de Donceel.

Jekel was a member of the Société entomologique de France. His zoological author abbreviation is Jekel.

== Taxon names honouring him ==
Over 60 species of beetle were named after Jekel, 44 of which are still valid today. These include Hypselotropis jekeli, Arachnobas jekeli, Cholus jekeli, Attelabus jekeli, Jordops jekeli, Gronops jekeli, Euops jekeli, Merohister jekeli and Cyrtonota jekeli.
