= Dichaetanthera =

Scientific classification
- Kingdom: Plantae
- Clade: Embryophytes
- Clade: Tracheophytes
- Clade: Spermatophytes
- Clade: Angiosperms
- Clade: Eudicots
- Clade: Rosids
- Order: Myrtales
- Family: Melastomataceae
- Genus: Dichaetanthera; Endl.

Genus of plants

Dichaetanthera is a genus of flowering plants belonging to the family Melastomataceae.

Its native range is tropical Africa, Madagascar.

Species:

- Dichaetanthera africana (Hook.f.) Jacq.-Fél.
- Dichaetanthera altissima Cogn.
- Dichaetanthera arborea Baker
- Dichaetanthera articulata Endl.
- Dichaetanthera asperrima Cogn.
- Dichaetanthera bifida Jum. & H.Perrier
- Dichaetanthera brevicauda Jum. & H.Perrier
- Dichaetanthera ciliata Jum. & H.Perrier
- Dichaetanthera cordifolia Baker
- Dichaetanthera cornifrons H.Perrier
- Dichaetanthera corymbosa (Cogn.) Jacq.-Fél.
- Dichaetanthera crassinodis Baker
- Dichaetanthera decaryi H.Perrier
- Dichaetanthera echinulata (Hook.f.) Jacq.-Fél.
- Dichaetanthera erici-rosenii (R.E.Fr.) A.Fern. & R.Fern.
- Dichaetanthera grandifolia Cogn.
- Dichaetanthera heteromorpha Triana
- Dichaetanthera hirsuta H.Perrier
- Dichaetanthera lancifolia H.Perrier
- Dichaetanthera lutescens H.Perrier
- Dichaetanthera madagascariensis Triana
- Dichaetanthera matitanensis Jum. & H.Perrier
- Dichaetanthera oblongifolia Baker
- Dichaetanthera parvifolia Cogn.
- Dichaetanthera rhodesiensis A.Fern. & R.Fern.
- Dichaetanthera rosea Cogn.
- Dichaetanthera rutenbergiana Baill. ex Vatke
- Dichaetanthera sambiranensis H.Perrier
- Dichaetanthera scabra Jum. & H.Perrier
- Dichaetanthera schatzii H.Ranariv. & Almeda
- Dichaetanthera schuilingiana P.A.Duvign. & Plancke
- Dichaetanthera squamata H.Perrier
- Dichaetanthera strigosa (Cogn.) Jacq.-Fél.
- Dichaetanthera trichopoda Jum. & H.Perrier
- Dichaetanthera tsaratanensis Jum. & H.Perrier
- Dichaetanthera verdcourtii A.Fern. & R.Fern.
- Dichaetanthera villosissima H.Perrier
