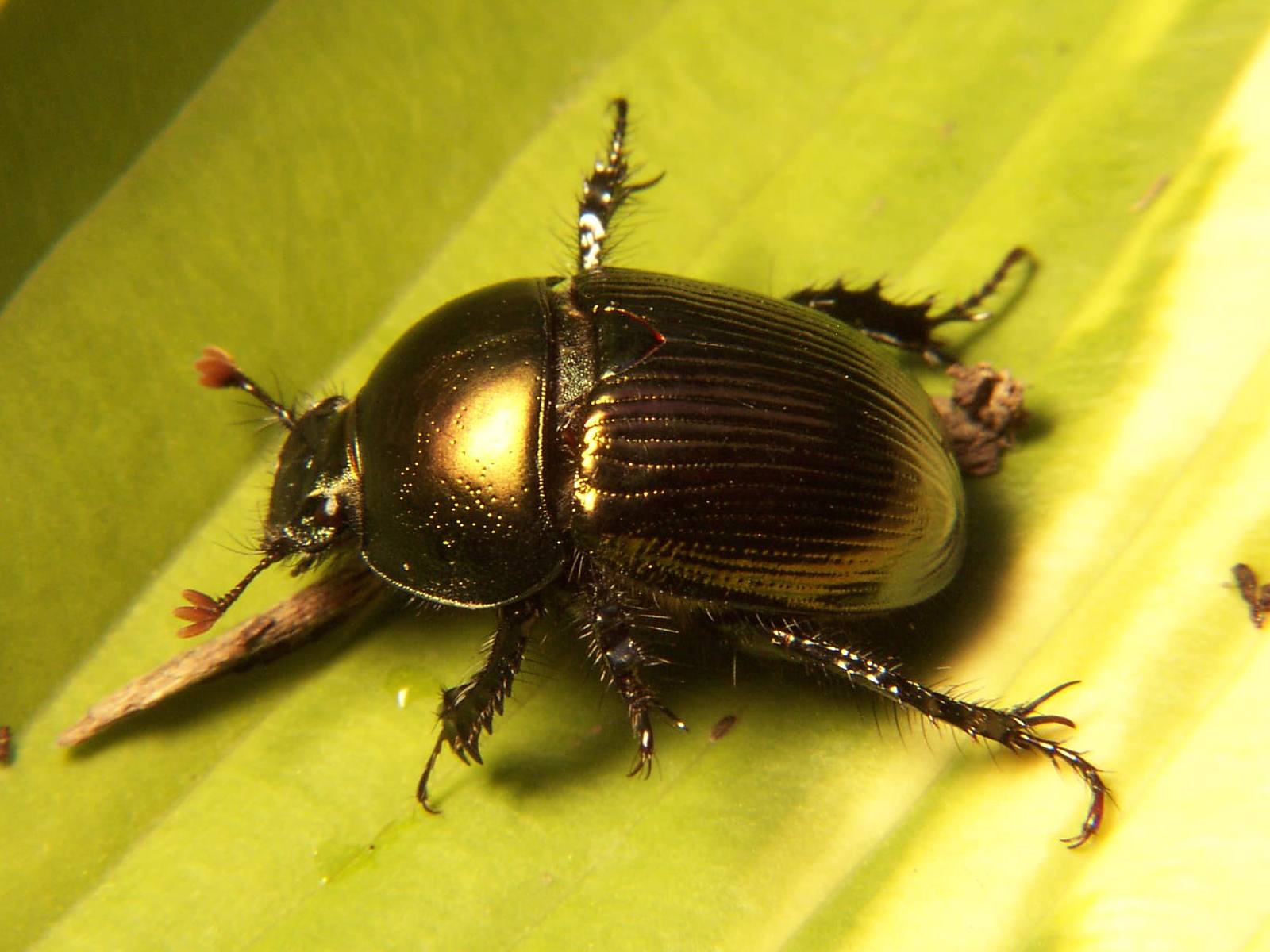
- Geotrupes egeriei

Scientific classification
- Kingdom: Animalia
- Phylum: Arthropoda
- Clade: Pancrustacea
- Class: Insecta
- Order: Coleoptera
- Suborder: Polyphaga
- Infraorder: Scarabaeiformia
- Superfamily: Scarabaeoidea
- Family: Geotrupidae; Latreille, 1802

Genera
- 25, see text

= Geotrupidae =

Family of beetles

Anoplotrupes stercorosus

Geotrupidae (from Greek γῆ (gē), earth, and τρῡπητής (trȳpētēs), borer) is a family of beetles in the order Coleoptera. They are commonly called earth-boring dung beetles or dor beetles. Most excavate burrows in which to lay their eggs. They are typically detritivores, provisioning their nests with leaf litter (often moldy), but are occasionally coprophagous, similar to dung beetles. The eggs are laid in or upon the provision mass and buried, and the developing larvae feed upon the provisions. The burrows of some species can exceed 2 metres in depth.

A few species communicate by stridulation (rubbing body parts together to make sounds).

== Classification ==
They were originally classified as the subfamily Geotrupinae in the family Scarabaeidae before being elevated to a family. Traditionally the family Bolboceratidae was included (as the subfamily Bolboceratinae) on the basis of the number of antenna segments, but examination of a different set of characteristics prompted Scholtz & Browne (1995) to elevate Bolboceratidae to a family, a result supported by recent phylogenetic research.

The family has more than 600 species in about 30 genera in two subfamilies; more recent phylogenetic studies indicate that Taurocerastinae is not related to Geotrupinae, and is instead more closely related to Lucanidae and Diphyllostomatidae.

- Geotrupinae
  - Allotrypes François, 1904 (= "Allotrupes" Boucomont, 1912)
  - Anoplotrupes Jekel, 1866
  - Baraudia López-Colón, 1996
  - Ceratophyus Fischer von Waldheim, 1823
  - Ceratotrupes Jekel, 1865
  - Chelotrupes Jekel, 1866
  - Cnemotrupes Jekel, 1866
  - Cretogeotrupes Nikolajev, 1992
  - Enoplotrupes Lucas, 1869
  - Geohowdenius Zunino, 1984
  - Geotrupes Latreille, 1796
  - Halffterius Zunino, 1984
  - Haplogeotrupes Nikolaev, 1979
  - Jekelius López-Colón, 1989
  - Lethrus Scopoli, 1777
  - Megatrupes Zunino, 1984
  - Mycotrupes LeConte, 1866
  - Odontotrypes Fairmaire, 1887
  - Onthotrupes Howden, 1964
  - Phelotrupes Jekel, 1866
  - Peltotrupes Blanchard, 1888
  - Pseudotrypocopris Miksic, 1954
  - Sericotrupes Zunino, 1984
  - Silphotrupes Jekel, 1866
  - Thorectes Mulsant, 1842
  - Trypocopris Motschulsky, 1860
  - Typhaeus Leach, 1815
  - Zuninoeus López-Colón, 1989
- Taurocerastinae
  - Frickius Germain, 1897
  - Taurocerastes Philippi, 1866
