= Charcoal starter =

A charcoal starter is a device or substance to help ignite charcoal fires. It may refer to:

- Chimney starter, a metal tube used with kindling
- Electric charcoal starter, using a heating element
- Charcoal lighter fluid, a flammable fluid
