= Pyromania (disambiguation) =

Pyromania is a mental disorder characterized by a compulsion to set fires.

Pyromania or Pyromaniac may also refer to:

- Pyromania (album), a 1983 album by Def Leppard
- "Pyromania" (song), a 2010 song by Cascada
- Pyromaniac (film), a 2016 Norwegian film
- The Pyromaniac, a thought experiment in epistemology

== See also ==
- Arson
- Firestarter (disambiguation)
- Start a Fire (disambiguation)
- Start the Fire (disambiguation)
