= Firestarter =

Firestarter may refer to:

== Fire making ==
- Fire making devices, including:
  - Fire drill (tool), a device to start a fire by friction
  - Firelighter, a small solid fuel tablet for kindling a fire
  - Fire striker, a piece of carbon steel from which sparks are struck by a suitable rock
  - Ferrocerium, a modern alternative inaccurately called "flint"
  - Magnesium alloy fire starter, a device used by hikers
  - Fire piston, a.k.a. slam rod fire starter
- Charcoal starting devices or substances:
  - Chimney starter, a metal tube used with kindling
  - Electric charcoal starter, using a heating element
  - Charcoal lighter fluid, a flammable fluid
- A person who starts fires:
  - Arsonist, a criminal who deliberately sets fire to property
  - Pyromaniac, a mentally ill person who sets fires
  - Pyrokinetic, a person having the psychic ability to create and control fire

== Books ==
- Firestarter (novel), a 1980 novel by Stephen King

== Film and television ==
- Firestarter (1984 film), based on the novel by Stephen King
- Firestarter (2022 film), a remake based on the novel by Stephen King
- Firestarter: Rekindled, a 2002 television miniseries sequel to the 1984 film
- Firestarter – The Story of Bangarra, 2020 Australian documentary film
- "Firestarter" (FLCL), an episode of FLCL
- "Firestarter" (Third Watch), an episode of Third Watch

== Music ==
- "Firestarter" (The Prodigy song) (1996)
- "Firestarter" (Samantha Jade song) (2013)
- "Firestarter" (soundtrack), the soundtrack to the 2022 film of the same name
- Firestarter (EP), an EP by Jimmy Eat World
- Quest for Fire: Firestarter, Vol. 1, an album by Kardinal Offishall
- "Firestarter", a song from Special Forces (38 Special album)
- "Fire Starter", a song from Elevation (Black Eyed Peas album)
- "Fire Starter", a song from Demi Lovato's album, Demi
- "Firestarter", a song by Ran-d & E-life (2015)

== Other ==
- FireStarter (video game), a 2003 first-person shooter video game
- Firestarter (firewall), a tool to configure a firewall for Linux
- Firestarter, a youth empowerment curriculum published by the Freechild Project

== See also ==
- Start a Fire (disambiguation)
- Start the Fire (disambiguation)
