= Lighter fluid =

Lighter fluid or lighter fuel may refer to:

- Butane, a highly flammable, colourless, easily liquefied gas used in gas-type lighters and butane torches
- Naphtha, a volatile flammable liquid hydrocarbon mixture used in wick-type lighters and burners
- Charcoal lighter fluid, an aliphatic petroleum solvent used in lighting charcoal in a barbecue grill
