= Charcoal =

Lightweight black carbon residue

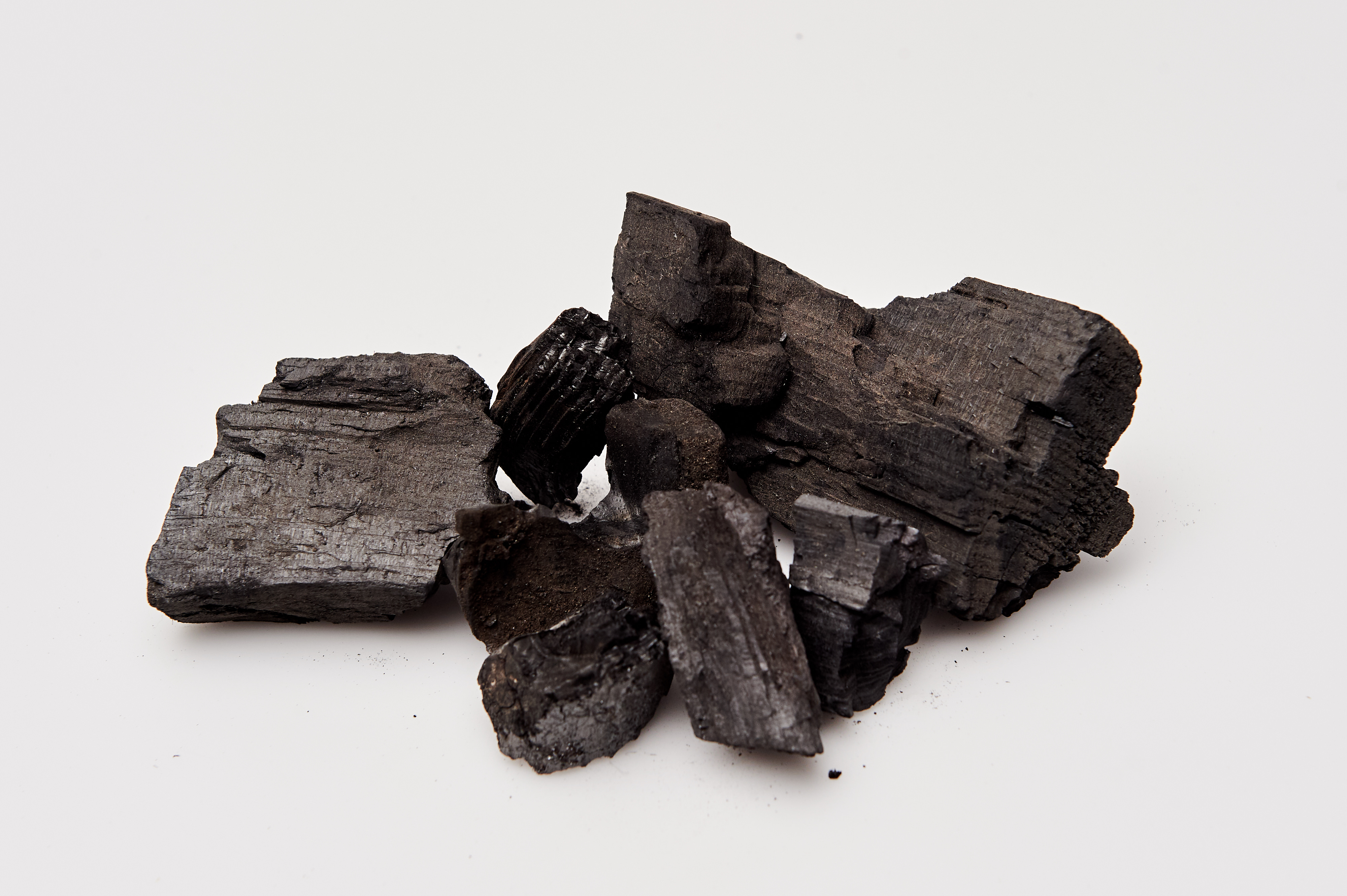
Charcoal

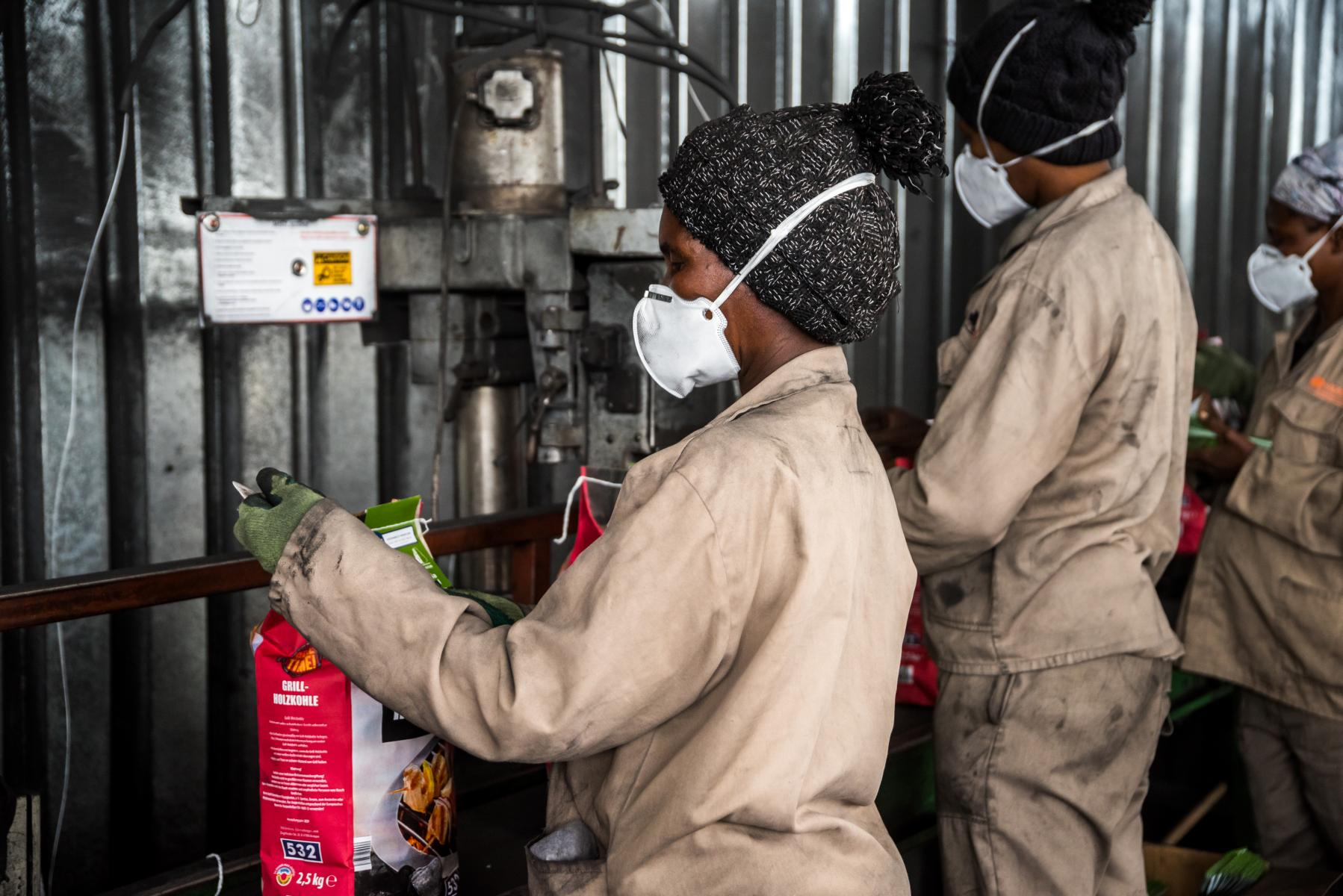
Packaging of charcoal for export in Namibia

Charcoal is a lightweight black residue made of carbon that is produced by strongly heating wood (or other animal and plant materials) in minimal oxygen to remove all water and volatile constituents. In the traditional version of this pyrolysis process, called charcoal burning, often by forming a charcoal kiln, the heat is supplied by burning part of the starting material itself, with a limited supply of oxygen. The material can also be heated in a closed retort. Modern charcoal briquettes used for outdoor cooking may contain many other additives, e.g. coal.

Charcoal has diverse applications, including as various fuels such as industrial fuel, cooking and heating fuels, and metallurgical fuel in iron and steel production, as well as a reducing agent in chemical processes, and as a raw material in pyrotechnics. It is also utilized in cosmetics, horticulture, animal husbandry, medicine using activated charcoal, and environmental sustainability efforts, such as carbon sequestration.

The early history of wood charcoal production spans ancient times, rooted in the abundance of wood in various regions. The process typically involves stacking wood billets to form a conical pile, allowing air to enter through openings at the bottom, and igniting the pile gradually. Charcoal burners, skilled professionals tasked with managing the delicate operation, often lived in isolation to tend their wood piles. Throughout history, the extensive production of charcoal has been a significant contributor to deforestation, particularly in regions like Central Europe. However, various management practices, such as coppicing, aimed to maintain a steady supply of wood for charcoal production. The scarcity of easily accessible wood resources eventually led to the transition to fossil fuel equivalents like coal.

Modern methods of charcoal production involve carbonizing wood in retorts, yielding higher efficiencies compared to traditional kilning methods. The properties of charcoal depend on factors such as the material charred and the temperature of carbonization. The production and utilization of charcoal can have adverse environmental impacts such as deforestation and emissions. Illegal and unregulated charcoal production is particularly prevalent in regions like South America and Africa.

== History ==
=== Charcoal pile ===
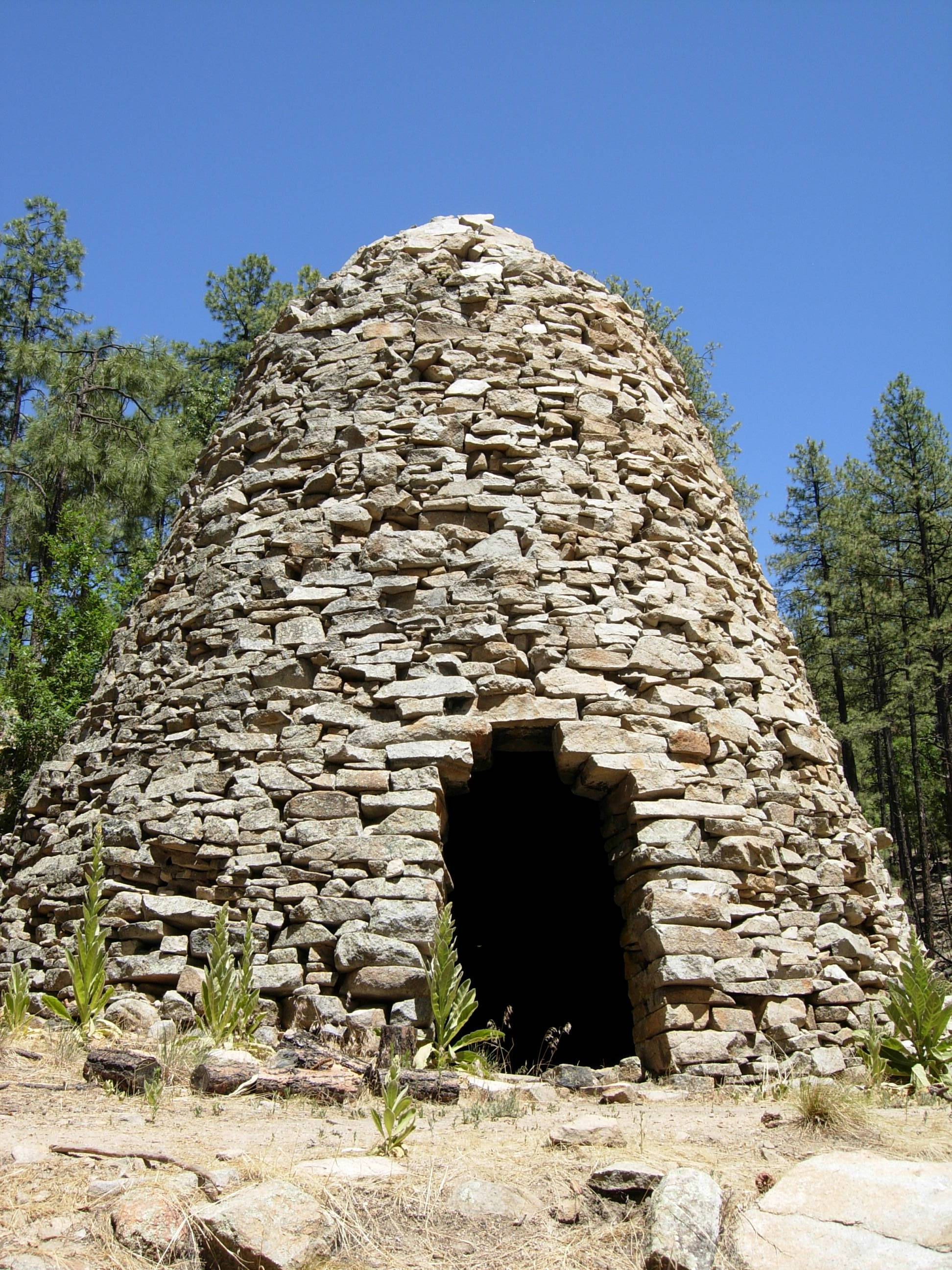
An abandoned charcoal kiln near Walker, Arizona, US

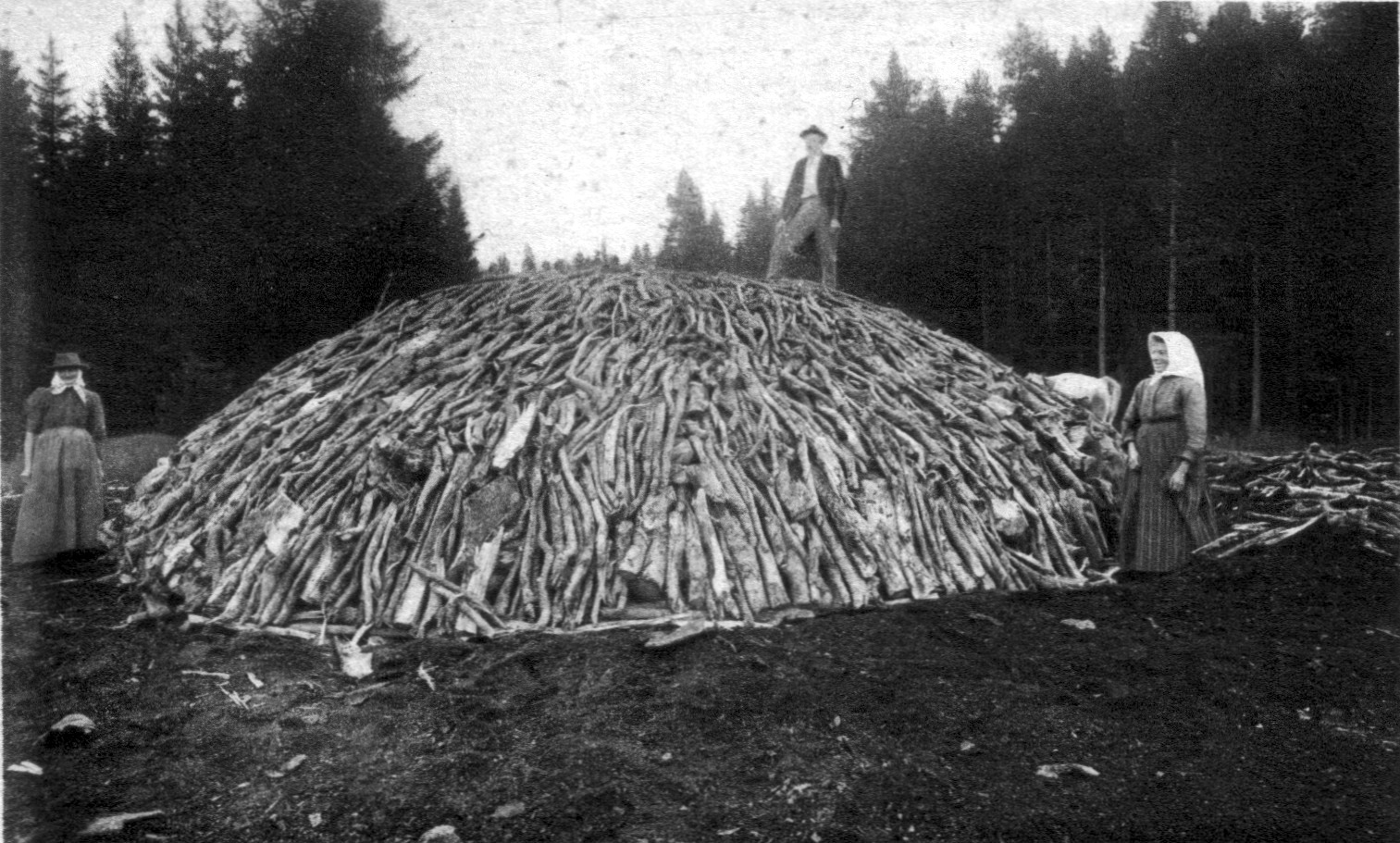
Wood pile before covering with turf or soil, and firing it (c. 1890)

The production of wood charcoal in locations where there is an abundance of wood dates back to ancient times. It generally began with piling billets of wood on their ends to form a conical pile. Openings were left at the bottom to admit air, with a central shaft serving as a flue. The whole pile was covered with turf or moistened clay. The firing began at the bottom of the flue, and the fire gradually spread outward and upward.

The traditional method in Britain used a charcoal pile or clamp. This was essentially a pile of wooden logs (e.g. seasoned oak) leaning in a circle against a chimney. The chimney consisted of 4 wooden stakes held up by some rope. In the clamp too the logs were completely covered with soil and straw allowing no air to enter. It must be lit by introducing some burning fuel into the chimney. The logs burned slowly and transformed into charcoal over a period of 5 days. If the soil covering became torn or cracked by the fire, additional soil was placed on the cracks. Once the burn was complete, the chimney was plugged to prevent air from entering.

==== Charcoal burners ====
The true art of this production method was in managing the sufficient generation of heat, by combusting part of the wood material, and the transfer of the heat to the wood in the process of being carbonized. The operation was so delicate that it was generally left to colliers (professional charcoal burners). They often lived alone in small huts to tend their wood piles. For example, in the Harz Mountains of Germany, charcoal burners lived in conical huts called Köten which still exist today.

==== Low efficiency and harmful emissions ====
The success of the operation depends upon the rate of the combustion. Under average conditions wood yields about 60% charcoal by volume, or 25% by weight; small-scale production methods often yield only about 50% by volume, while large-scale methods enabled higher yields of about 90% by the 17th century. A strong disadvantage of this production method is the huge amount of emissions that are harmful to human health and the environment (emissions of unburnt methane). As a result of the partial combustion of wood material, the efficiency of the traditional method is low.

=== Peak of production and decline ===
==== Deforestation and scarcity ====
The massive production of charcoal (at its height employing hundreds of thousands, mainly in Alpine and neighbouring forests) was a major cause of deforestation, especially in Central Europe. Complaints (as early as the Stuart period) about shortages may stem from over-exploitation or the impossibility of increasing production to match growing demand. In England, many woods were managed as coppices, which were cut and regrown cyclically, so that a steady supply of charcoal was available. But the increasing scarcity of easily harvested wood was a major factor behind the switch to fossil fuel equivalents, mainly coal and brown coal for industrial use.

==== By-product of wood tar production ====
In Finland and Scandinavia, charcoal was considered the by-product of wood tar production. The best tar came from pine, thus pinewoods were cut down for tar pyrolysis. The residual charcoal was widely used as substitute for metallurgical coke in blast furnaces for smelting. Tar production led to rapid local deforestation. The end of tar production at the end of the 19th century resulted in rapid re-forestation of affected areas.

==== Charcoal briquette ====
The American form of the charcoal briquette was first invented and patented by Ellsworth B. A. Zwoyer of Pennsylvania in 1897 and was produced by the Zwoyer Fuel Company. The process was further popularized by Henry Ford, who used wood and sawdust byproducts from automobile fabrication as a feedstock. Ford Charcoal went on to become the Kingsford Company.

== Production methods ==
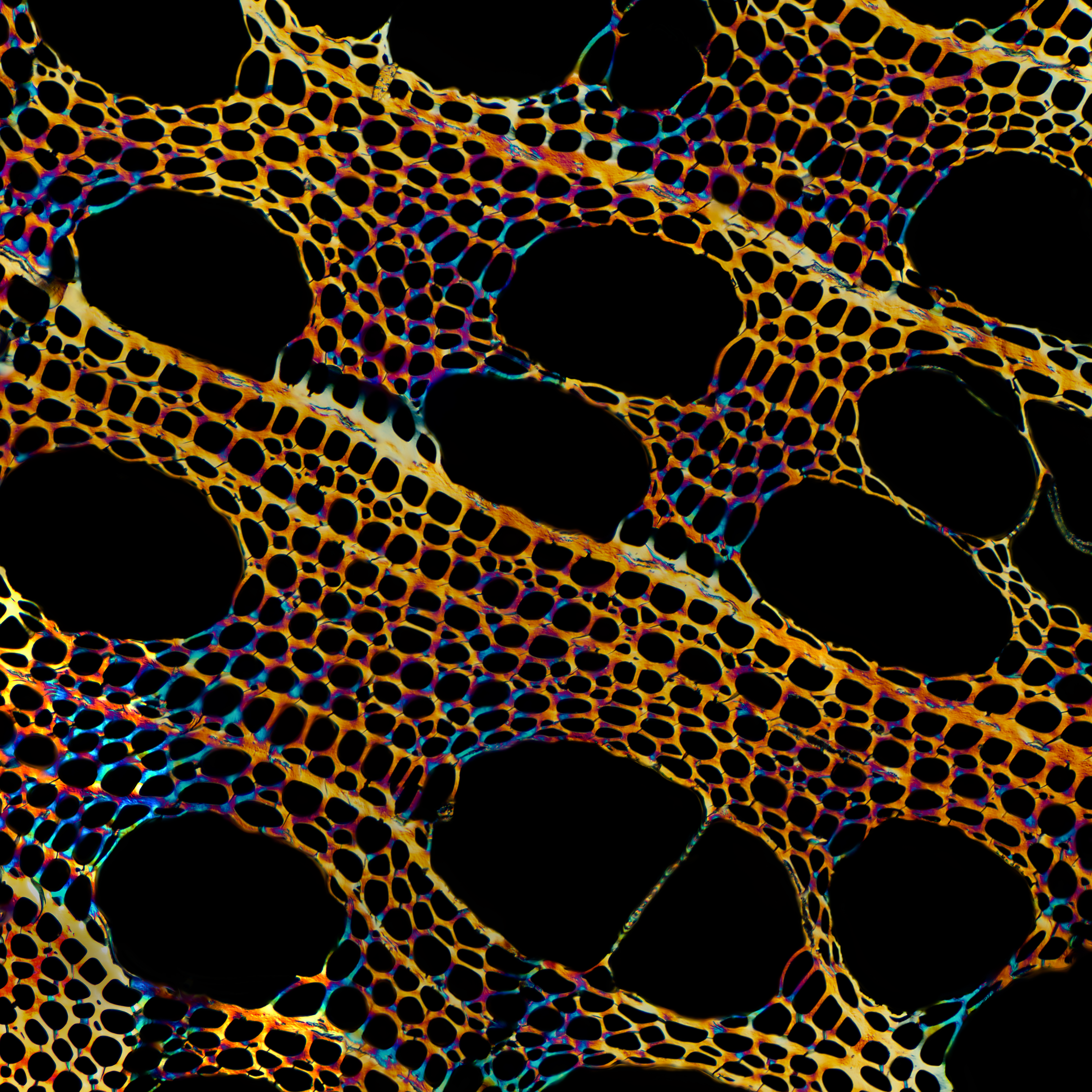
Charcoal under a microscope. Different colors correspond to different relief. Only a charred skeleton remains of the wood cells after charring.

The modern process of carbonizing wood, either in small pieces or as sawdust in cast iron retorts, is extensively practiced where wood is scarce, and also for the recovery of valuable byproducts (wood spirit, pyroligneous acid, wood tar), which the process permits. The question of the temperature of the carbonization is important; according to J. Percy, wood becomes brown at 220 °C (430 °F), a deep brown-black after some time at 280 °C (540 °F), and an easily powdered mass at 310 °C (590 °F). Charcoal made at 300 °C (570 °F) is brown, soft and friable, and readily inflames at 380 °C (720 °F); made at higher temperatures it is hard and brittle, and does not fire until heated to about 700 °C (1,300 °F).

Modern methods employ retorting technology, in which process heat is recovered from, and solely provided by, the combustion of gas released during carbonization. Yields of retorting are considerably higher than those of kilning, and may reach 35%-40%.

The properties of the charcoal produced depend on the material charred. The charring temperature is also important. Charcoal contains varying amounts of hydrogen and oxygen as well as ash and other impurities that, together with the structure, determine the properties. The approximate composition of charcoal for gunpowders is sometimes empirically described as C_{7}H_{4}O. To obtain a coal with high purity, source material should be free of non-volatile compounds.

Wood charcoal is obtained as the residue by destructive distillation of wood such that the products are:

- Liquid products – pyroligneous acid and wood tar
- Gaseous products – wood gas
- Residual product – wood charcoal

== Types ==
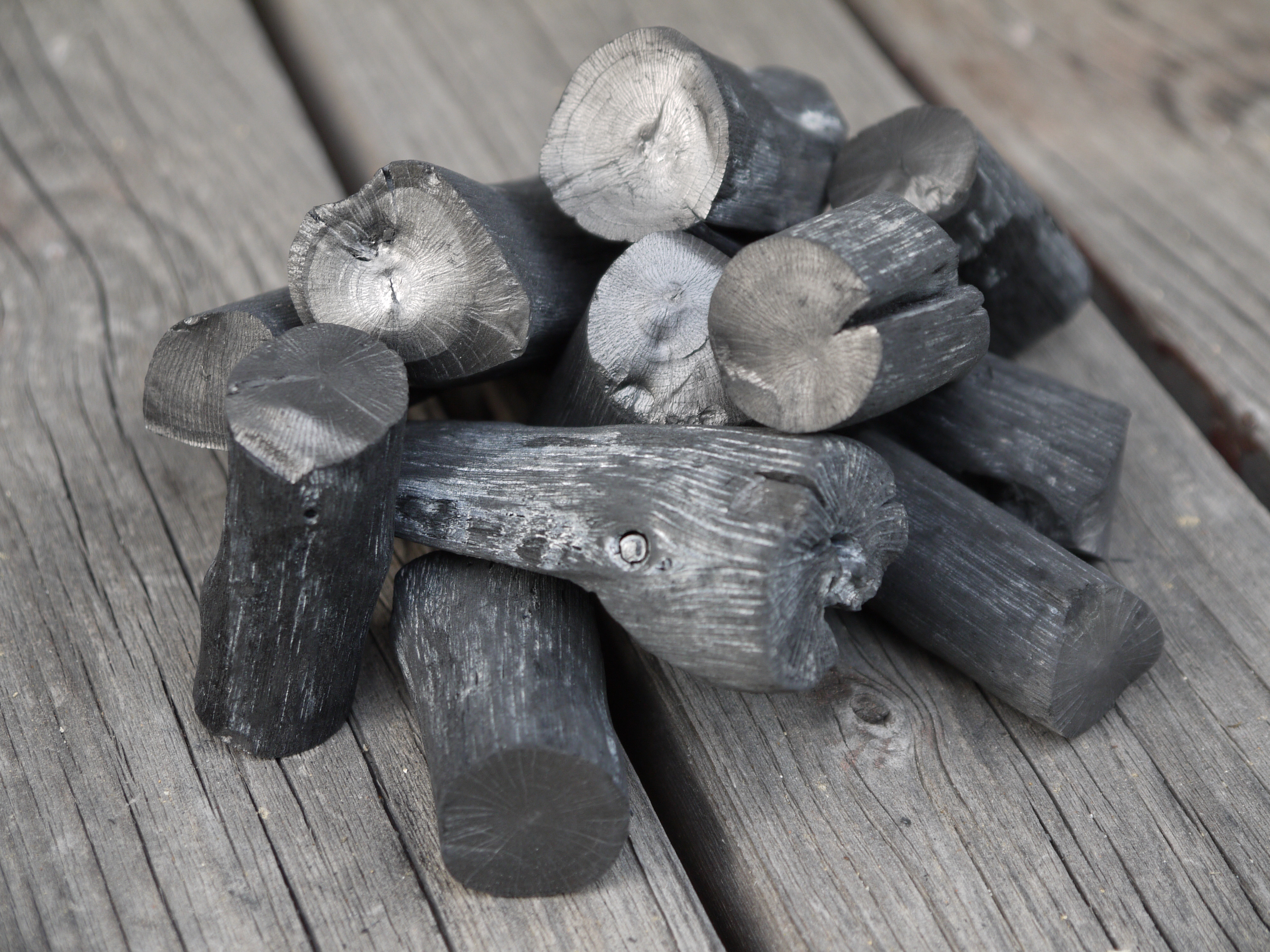
Binchōtan, Japanese high grade charcoal made from ubame oak

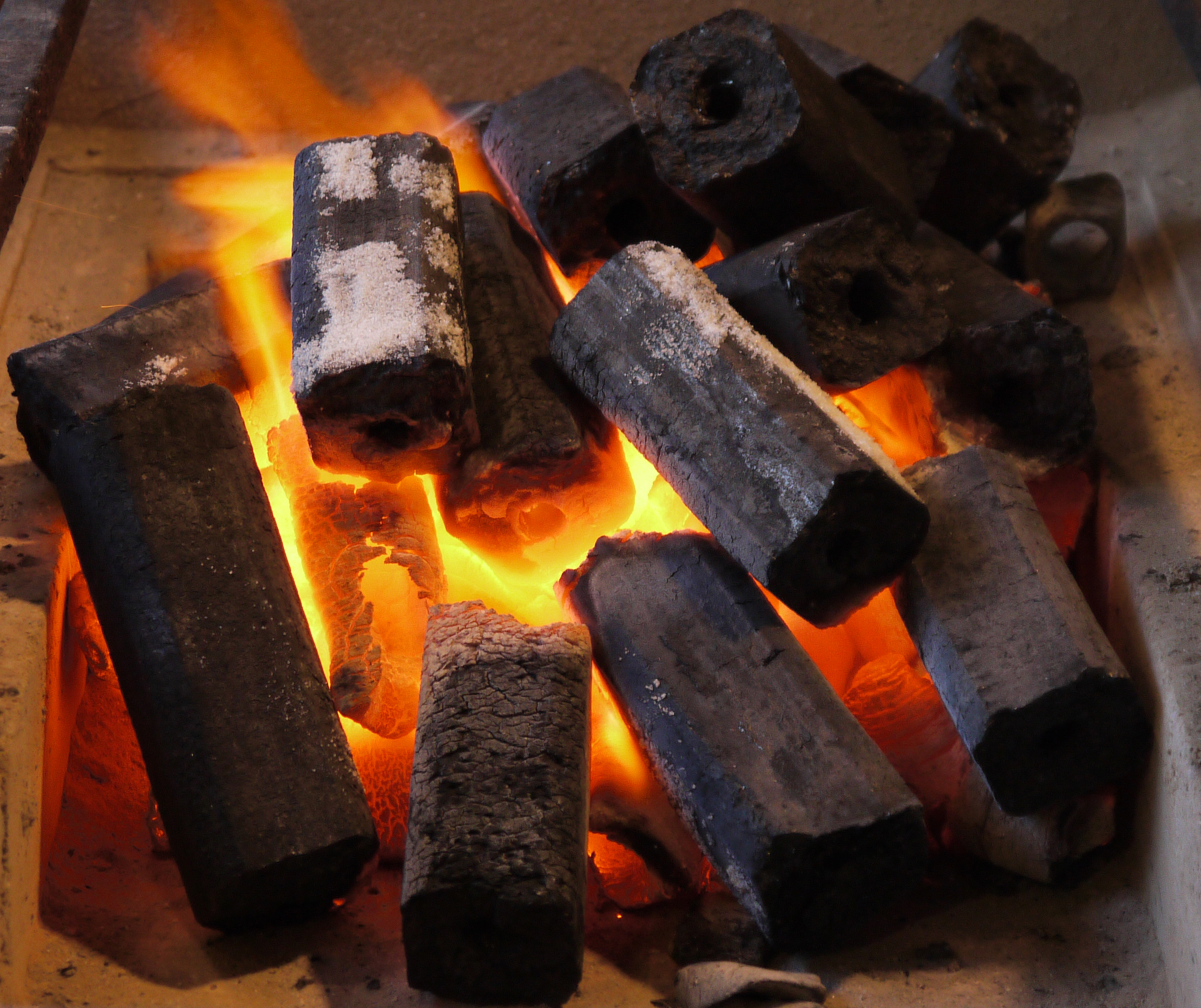
Ogatan, charcoal briquettes made from sawdust

- Common charcoal is made from peat, coal, wood, coconut shell, or petroleum.
- Sugar charcoal is obtained from the carbonization of sugar and is particularly pure. It is purified by boiling with acids to remove any mineral matter and is then burned for a long time in a current of chlorine to remove the last traces of hydrogen. It was used by Henri Moissan in his early attempt to create synthetic diamonds.
- Activated charcoal is similar to common charcoal but is manufactured especially for medical use. To produce activated charcoal, common charcoal is heated to about 900 °C (1,700 °F) in the presence of an inert gas (usually argon or nitrogen), causing the charcoal to develop many internal spaces, or "pores", which help the activated charcoal to trap chemicals. Impurities on the surface of the charcoal are also removed during this process, greatly increasing its adsorption capacity.
- Lump charcoal is a traditional charcoal made directly from hardwood material. It usually produces far less ash than briquettes.
- Japanese charcoal has had pyroligneous acid removed during the charcoal making; it therefore produces almost no smell or smoke when burned. The traditional charcoal of Japan is classified into three types:
  - White charcoal (Binchōtan) is hard and produces a metallic sound when struck.
  - Black charcoal
  - Ogatan is a more recent type made from hardened sawdust.
- Pillow shaped briquettes are made by compressing charcoal, typically made from sawdust and other wood by-products, with a binder and other additives. The binder is usually starch. Briquettes may also include brown coal (heat source), mineral carbon (heat source), borax, sodium nitrate (ignition aid), limestone (ash-whitening agent), raw sawdust (ignition aid), and other additives.
- Sawdust briquette charcoal is made by compressing sawdust without binders or additives. It is the preferred charcoal in Taiwan, Korea, Greece, and the Middle East. It has a round hole through the center, with a hexagonal cross-section. It is used primarily for barbecue as it produces no odor, no smoke, little ash, high heat, and has a long burning time (exceeding 4 hours).
- Extruded charcoal is made by extruding either raw ground wood or carbonized wood into logs without the use of a binder. The heat and pressure of the extruding process hold the charcoal together. If the extrusion is made from raw wood material, the extruded logs are subsequently carbonized.

== Uses ==
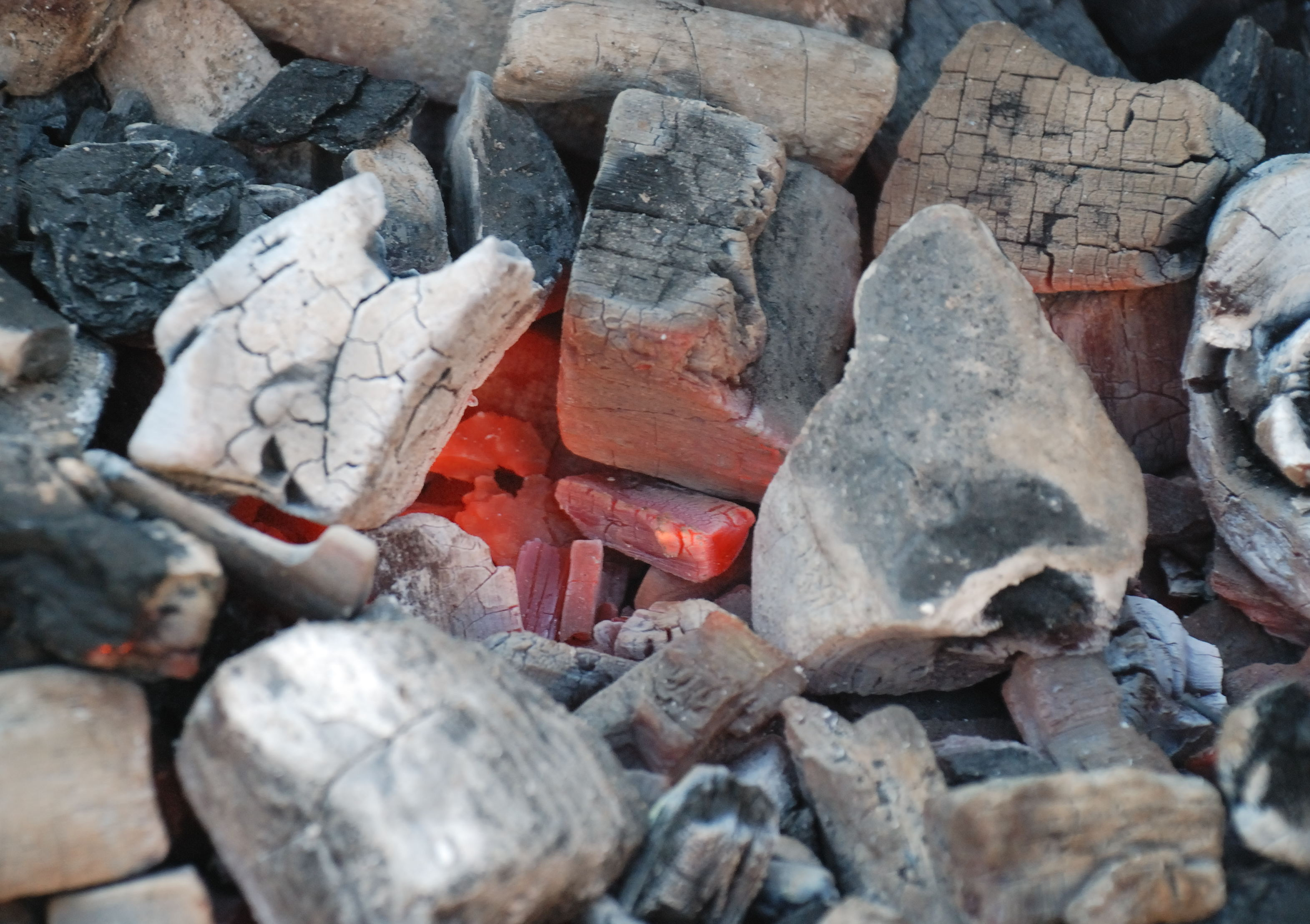
Charcoal burning

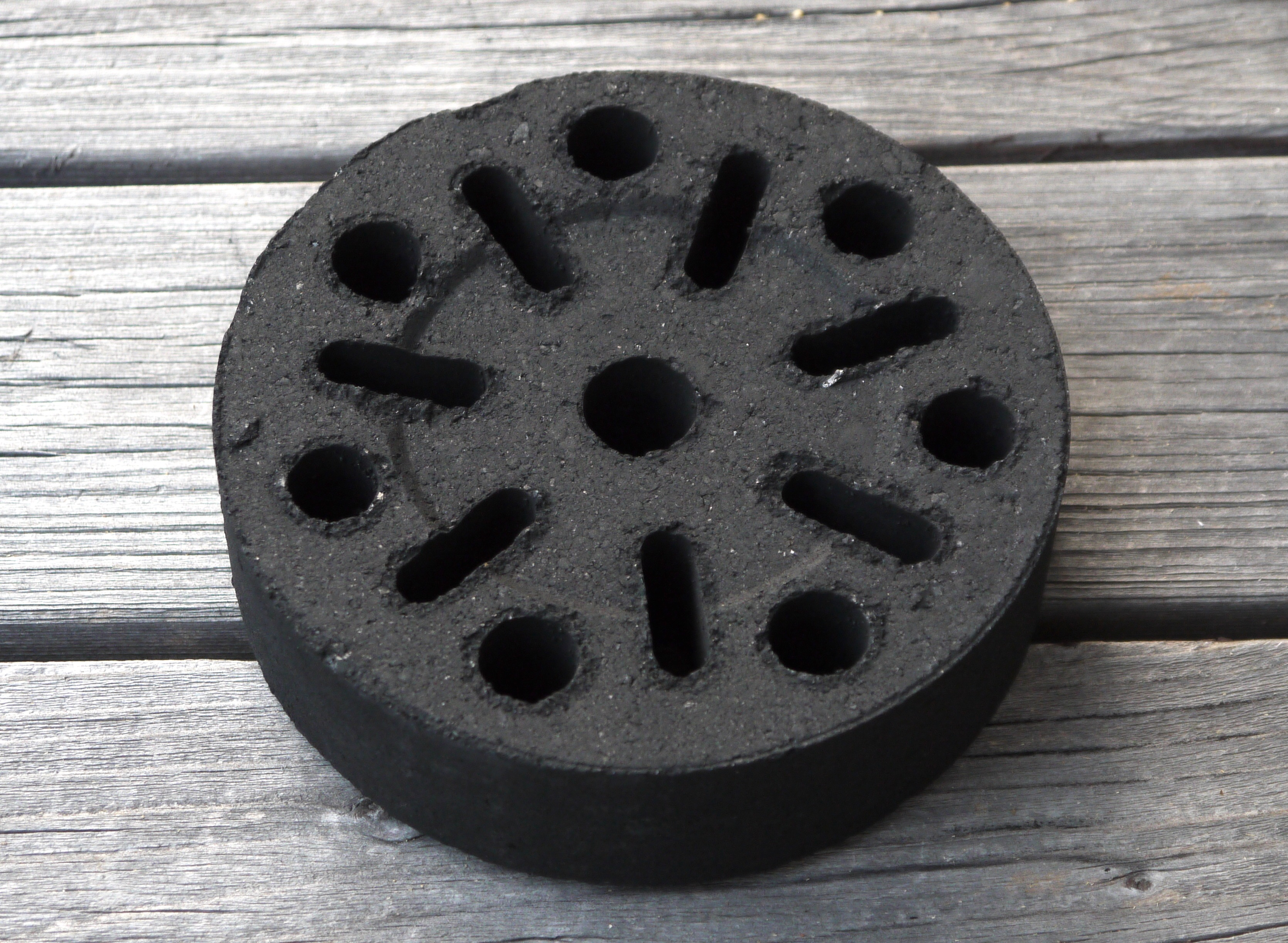
Grill charcoal made from coconut shell

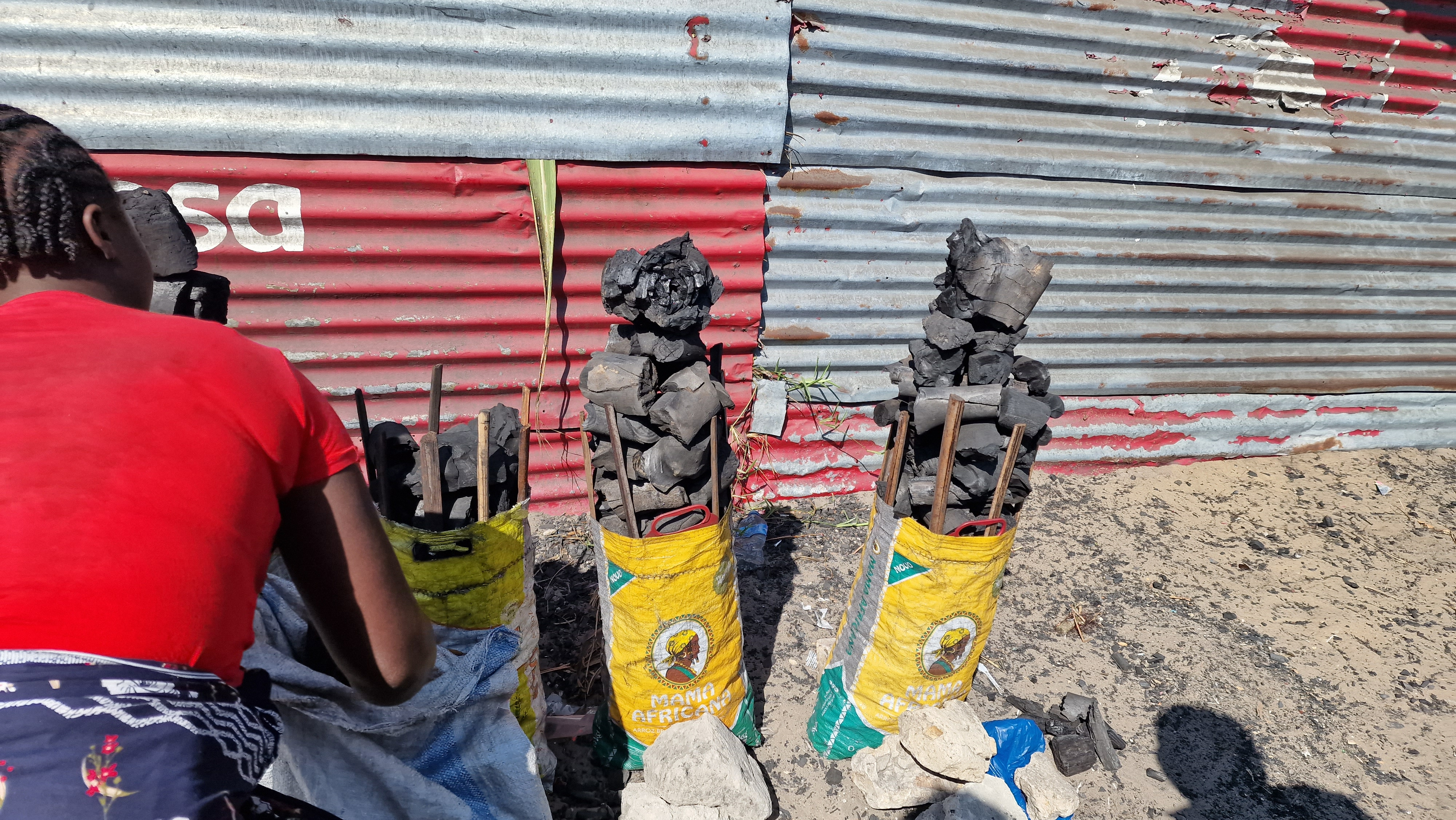
Charcoal for sale in Mozambique, Africa – a common household fuel

Charcoal has been used since earliest times for a large range of purposes including art and medicine, but by far its most important use has been as a metallurgical fuel. Charcoal is the traditional fuel of a blacksmith's forge and other applications where an intense heat is required. Charcoal was also used historically as a source of black pigment by grinding it up. In this form charcoal was important to early chemists and was a constituent of formulas for mixtures such as black powder. Due to its high surface area, charcoal can be used as a filter, catalyst, or adsorbent.

=== Metallurgical fuel ===
Charcoal burns at temperatures exceeding 1,100 degrees Celsius (2,010 degrees Fahrenheit). By comparison, the melting point of iron is approximately 1,200 to 1,550 °C (2,190 to 2,820 °F). Due to its porosity, it is sensitive to the flow of air and the heat generated can be moderated by controlling the air flow to the fire. For this reason charcoal is still widely used by blacksmiths. Charcoal has been used for the production of iron and steel (where it also provided the necessary carbon) since at least 2000 BCE, with artifacts having been found in Proto-Hittite layers at Kaman-Kalehöyük. Charcoal briquettes can burn up to approximately 1,260 °C (2,300 °F) with a forced air blower forge.

In the 16th century, England had to pass laws to prevent the country from becoming completely denuded of trees due to production of iron. In the 19th century charcoal was largely replaced by coke in steel production due to cost, even though coke usually adds sulphur and sometimes other deleterious contaminants to the pig iron. Wooded metallurgical regions devoid of coal like Sweden, the Urals, or Siberia transitioned from charcoal in the early 20th century.

=== Cooking and heating fuel ===
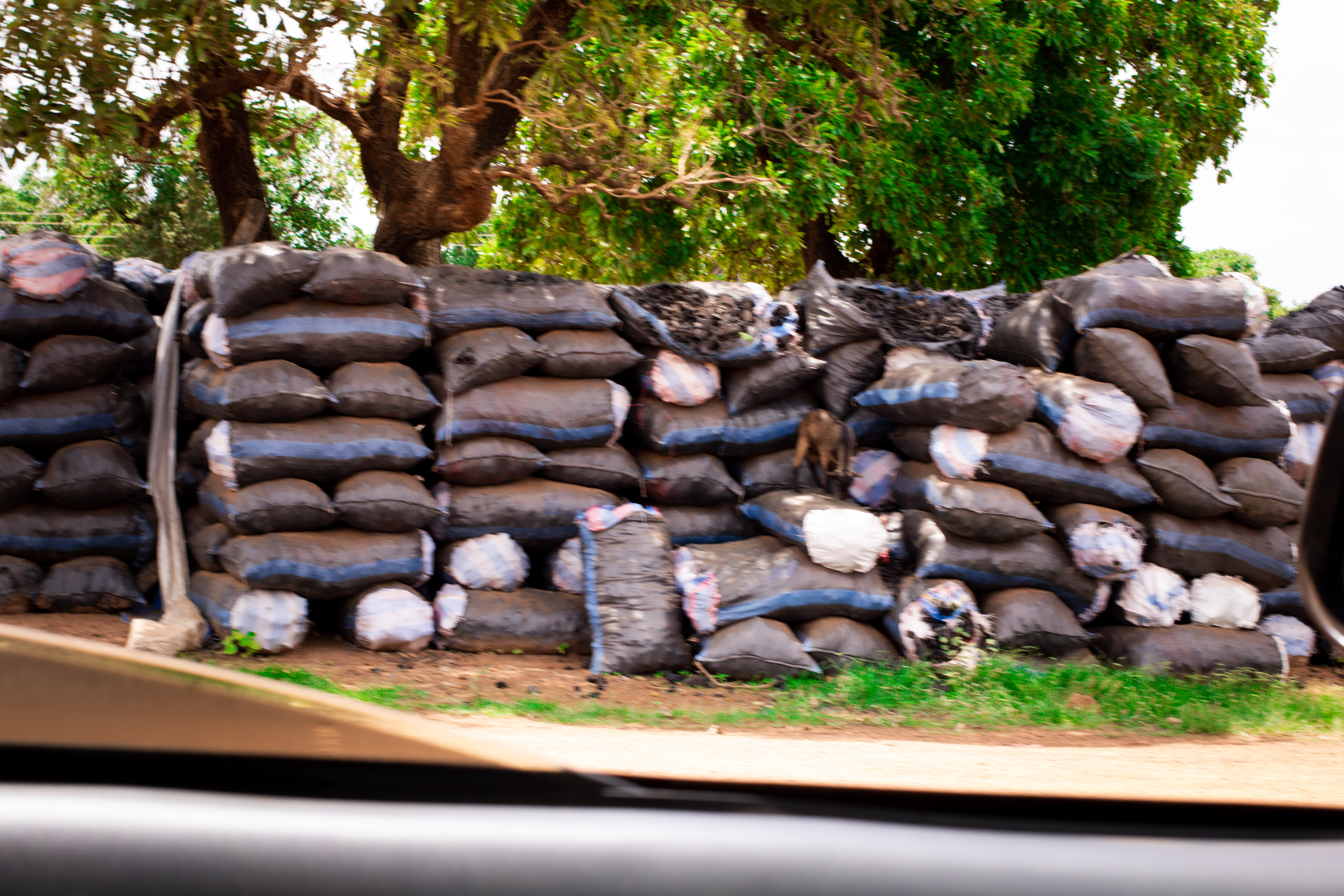
Bags of charcoal in Ghana

Prior to the Industrial Revolution, charcoal was occasionally used as a cooking fuel. It is counted as a smokeless fuel; that is, the carbon is sufficiently pure that burning it causes substantially less air pollution than burning the original uncarbonized organic material would. In the 20th century, clean-air legislation mandated smokeless fuels (mostly coke or charcoal) in many areas of Europe. In the 21st century, charcoal has been advocated as a way to improve the health of people burning raw biomass for cooking and/or heating. Modern "charcoal" briquettes, widely used for outdoor cooking, are made with charcoal but may also include coal as an energy source as well as accelerants, binders and filler.

To contain the charcoal and use it for cooking purposes, a barbecue grill may be used. A small Japanese charcoal grill is known as a shichirin. A brazier is a container used to burn charcoal or other solid fuel.

To start the charcoal burning is harder than starting a wood fire and charcoal lighter fluid may be employed. A chimney starter or electric charcoal starter are tools to help with starting to light charcoal.

Approximately 75% of fuel burned in Haiti is charcoal.

=== Reducing agent ===
Certain types of charcoal, such as wood charcoal, are used in carbothermic reactions to reduce heated metallic oxides to their respective metals. For example:

- ZnO + C → Zn + CO
- Fe_{2}O_{3} + 3C → 2Fe + 3CO

Charcoal can also be in gasification used to reduce super heated steam to hydrogen (along with the formation of carbon monoxide). For example:

- C + H_{2}O (1000 °C) → H_{2} + CO (Water gas)

=== Syngas production, automotive fuel ===
Like many other sources of carbon, charcoal can be used for the production of various syngas compositions; i.e., various CO + H_{2} + CO_{2} + N_{2} mixtures. The syngas is typically used as fuel, including automotive propulsion, or as a chemical feedstock.

In times of scarce petroleum, automobiles and even buses have been converted to burn wood gas: a gas mixture consisting primarily of diluting atmospheric nitrogen, but also containing combustible gasses (mostly carbon monoxide) released by burning charcoal or wood in a wood gas generator. In 1931, Tang Zhongming developed an automobile powered by charcoal, and these cars were popular in China until the 1950s, and in occupied France during World War II, where they were called gazogènes.

=== Pyrotechnics ===
Mangrove charcoal burning video

Charcoal is used in the production of black powder, which is used extensively in the production of fireworks. It is usually ground into a fine powder, with air float grade being the finest particle size available commercially. When used in black powder compositions, it is often ball-milled with other ingredients so that they are intimately mixed together. Certain charcoals perform better when used to make black powder; these include spruce, willow, paulownia and grapevine among others. Charcoal produces fine dark orange/golden sparks. Usually, powder with a mesh size from 10 to 325 is used to obtain showers of golden sparks in pyrotechnic compositions.

=== Cosmetic use of bamboo charcoal ===
Charcoal is also incorporated in multiple cosmetic products. It can be produced from regular bamboo cut into small pieces and boiled in water to remove soluble compounds. Raw bamboo charcoal is obtained after drying and carbonization in an oven at elevated temperature. The role of charcoal in cosmetics is based on its highly effective absorbing properties at a microscopic scale.

=== Carbon source ===
Charcoal may be used as a source of carbon in chemical reactions. One example of this is the production of carbon disulphide through the reaction of sulfur vapors with hot charcoal. In that case, the wood should be charred at high temperature to reduce the residual amounts of hydrogen and oxygen that lead to side reactions.

=== Purification and filtration ===
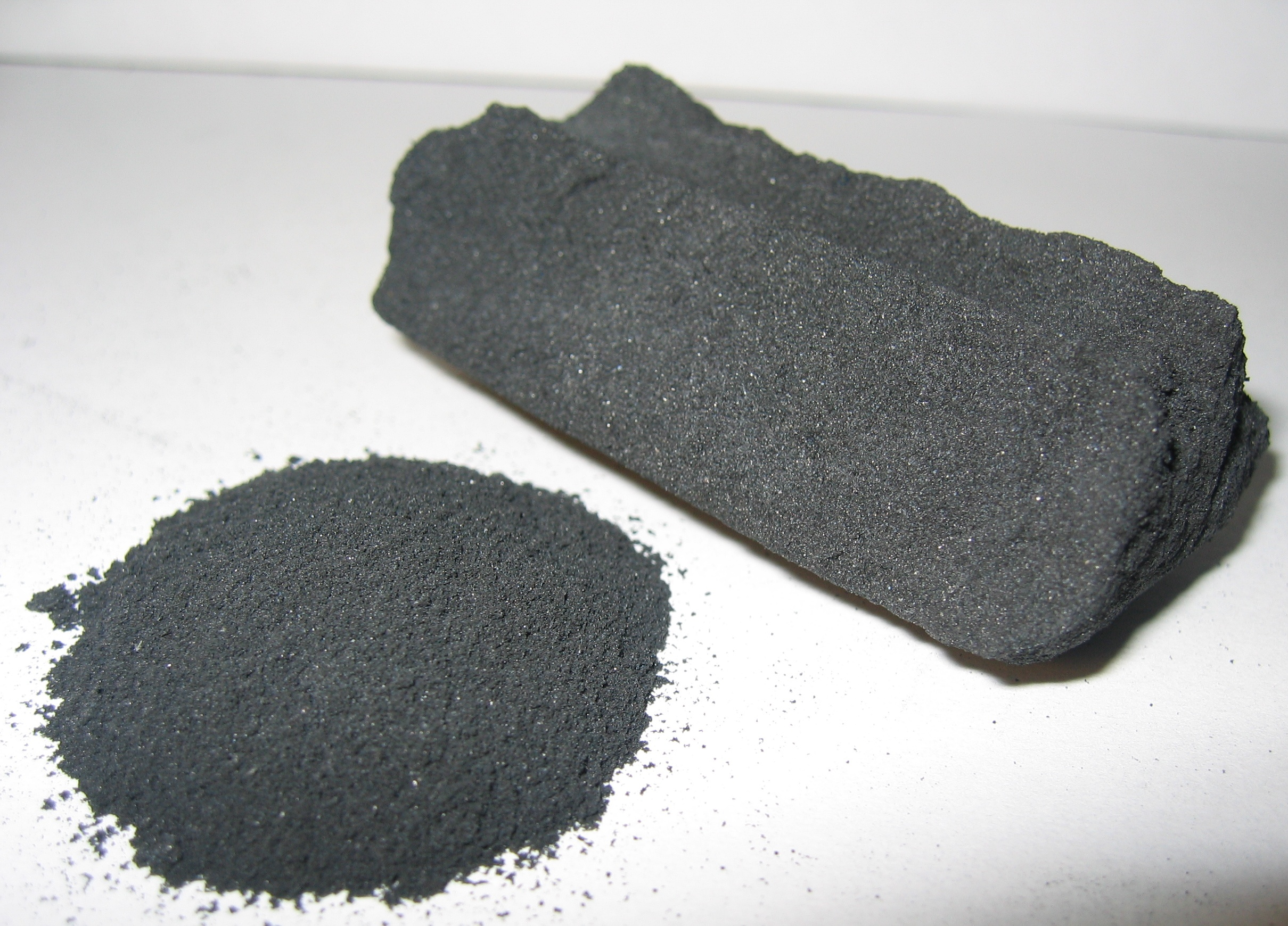
Activated carbon

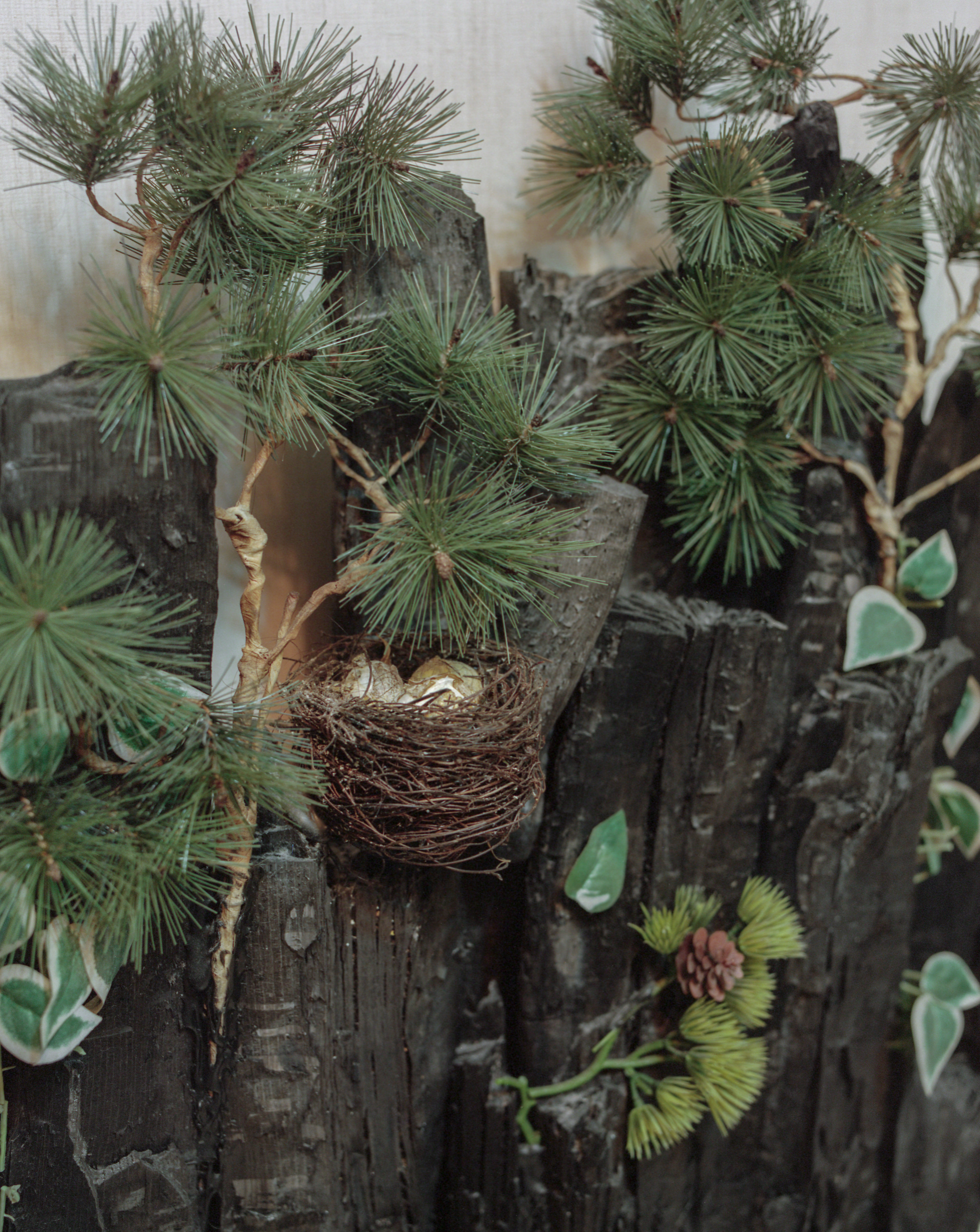
Charcoal for dehumidification and air purification in bathroom

Charcoal may be activated to increase its effectiveness as a filter. Activated charcoal readily adsorbs a wide range of organic compounds dissolved or suspended in gases and liquids. In certain industrial processes, such as the purification of sucrose from cane sugar, impurities cause an undesirable color, which can be removed with activated charcoal. It is also used to absorb odors and toxins in gaseous solutions, as in home air purifiers and some types of gas mask. The medical use of activated charcoal is mainly the absorption of poisons. Activated charcoal is available without a prescription, so it is used for a variety of health-related applications. For example, it is often used to reduce discomfort and embarrassment due to excessive gas (flatulence) in the digestive tract.

Animal charcoal or bone black is the carbonaceous residue obtained by the dry distillation of bones. It contains only about 10% carbon, the remaining being calcium and magnesium phosphates (80%) and other inorganic material originally present in the bones. It is generally manufactured from the residues obtained in the glue and gelatin industries. Its bleaching power was applied in 1812 by Derosne for clarifying sugar syrup, but its use in this direction has now greatly diminished. Today it is seldom used for this purpose due to the introduction of more active and easily managed reagents, but it is still employed to some extent in laboratory practice. The bleaching action of the charcoal in solution diminishes as it adsorbs colored contaminants, and it must be reactivated periodically by separate washing and reheating. While wood charcoal effectively removes some pigments and contaminants from solutions, bone charcoal is generally more effective as an adsorption filter due to its increased porosity and surface area.

=== Medicine ===
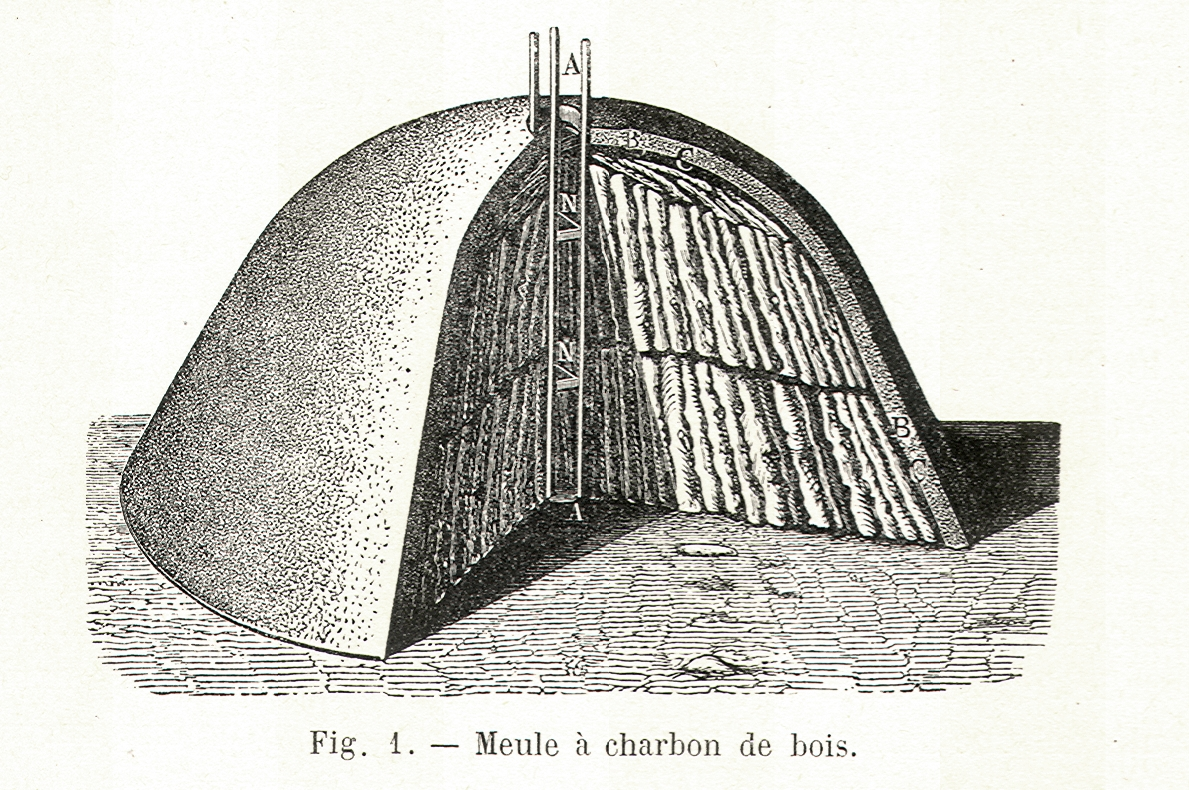
Charcoal pile

Charcoal in the form of charcoal biscuits was consumed in the past for gastric problems. It can be consumed in tablet, capsule, or powder form for digestive effects. Research regarding its effectiveness is controversial. It is usually used in poison control by neutralizing toxins.

Charcoal has been used in combination with saccharin in research to measure mucociliary transport time.

Charcoal has also been incorporated into toothpaste formulas; however, there is no evidence to determine its safety and effectiveness.

Red colobus monkeys in Africa have been observed eating charcoal for self-medication. Because their leafy diets contain high levels of cyanide, which may lead to indigestion, they learned to consume charcoal, which absorbs the cyanide and relieves discomfort. This knowledge is transmitted from mother to infant.

=== Art ===
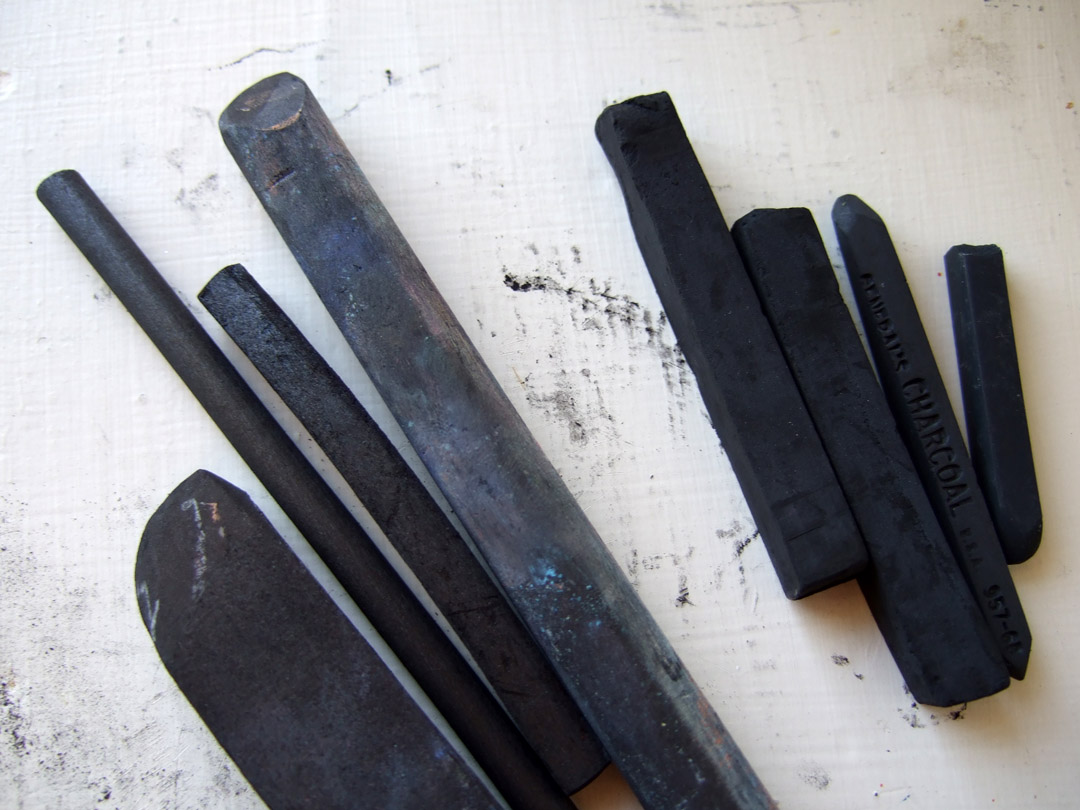
Four sticks of vine charcoal and four sticks of compressed charcoal

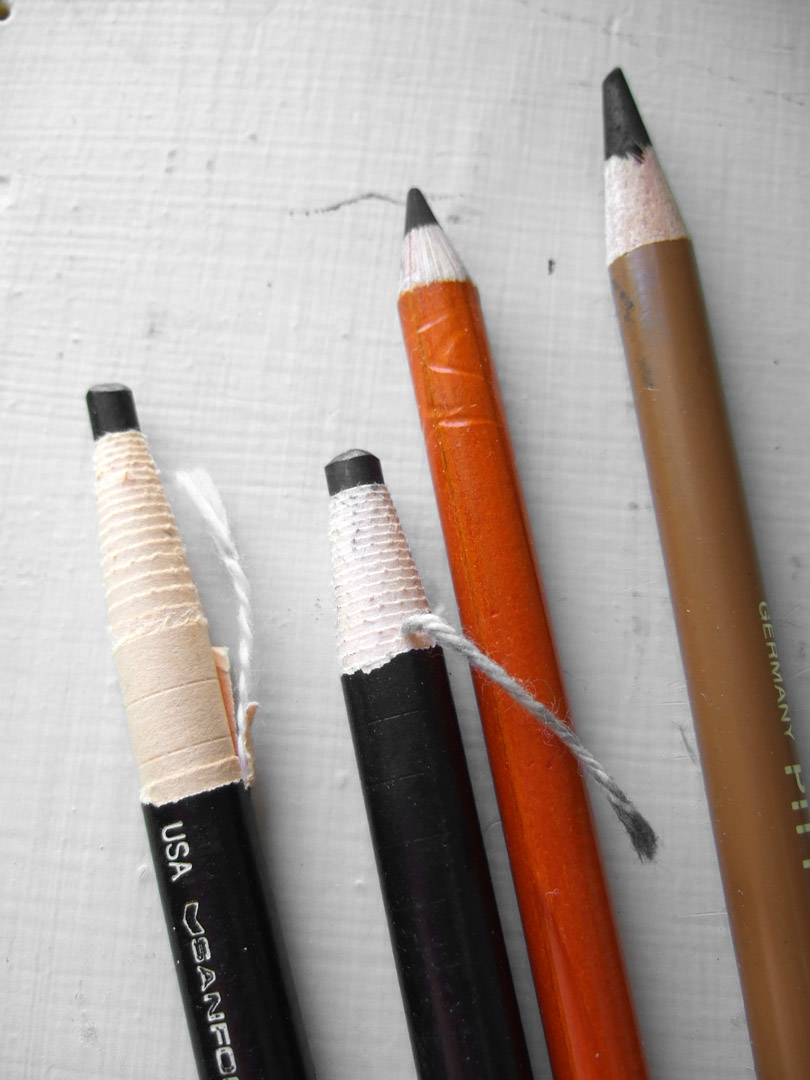
Two charcoal pencils in paper sheaths that are unwrapped as the pencil is used, and two charcoal pencils in wooden sheaths

Charcoal is used for drawing, making rough sketches in painting, and is one of the possible media used for making a parsemage. It usually must be preserved by the application of a fixative. Artists generally utilize charcoal in four forms:

- Vine charcoal is created by burning grapevines.
- Willow charcoal is created by burning willow sticks.
- Powdered charcoal is often used to "tone" or cover large sections of a drawing surface. Drawing over the toned areas darkens it further, but the artist can also lighten (or completely erase) within the toned area to create lighter tones.
- Compressed charcoal is charcoal powder mixed with gum binder and compressed into sticks. The amount of binder determines the hardness of the stick. Compressed charcoal is used in charcoal pencils.

=== Horticulture ===
One additional use of charcoal was rediscovered recently for horticulture. Although American gardeners have used charcoal for a short time, research on terra preta soils in Amazonia has discovered the widespread use of biochar by pre-Columbian natives to ameliorate unproductive soil into soil rich in carbon. The technique may find modern application, both to improve soils and as a means of carbon sequestration.

=== Animal husbandry ===
Charcoal is mixed with feed, added to litter, or used in the treatment of manure. Poultry benefits from using charcoal in this manner.

A concern that activated charcoal might be used unscrupulously to allow livestock to tolerate low quality feed contaminated with aflatoxins resulted in the Association of American Feed Control Officials banning it in 2012 from use in commercial livestock feeds.

== Environmental impact ==
Bagged Charcoal in Bole Bamboi, Ghana

Production and use of charcoal, like any use of woody biomass as fuel, typically results in emissions and can contribute to deforestation.

The use of charcoal as a smelting fuel has been experiencing a resurgence in South America resulting in severe environmental, social and medical problems. Charcoal production at a sub-industrial level is one of the causes of deforestation. Charcoal production is now usually illegal and nearly always unregulated, as in Brazil, where charcoal production is a large illegal industry for making pig iron.

Massive forest destruction has been documented in areas such as Virunga National Park in the Democratic Republic of Congo, where it is considered a primary threat to the survival of the mountain gorillas. Similar threats are found in Zambia. In Malawi, illegal charcoal trade employs 92,800 workers and is the main source of heat and cooking fuel for 90 percent of the nation's population. Some experts, such as Duncan MacQueen, Principal Researcher–Forest Team, International Institute for Environment and Development (IIED), argue that while illegal charcoal production causes deforestation, a regulated charcoal industry that required replanting and sustainable use of the forests "would give their people clean efficient energy – and their energy industries a strong competitive advantage".

Assessments of charcoal imported to Europe have shown that many charcoal products are produced from tropical wood, often of undeclared origin. In an analysis of barbecue charcoal marketed in Germany, the World Wildlife Fund found that most products contain tropical wood. As a notable exception, reference is made to barbecue charcoal imports from Namibia, where charcoal is typically produced from surplus biomass resulting from woody plant encroachment. Charcoal trafficking in Somalia is an economic and environmental issue with significant regional-security implications.

== In popular culture ==
The last section of the film Le Quattro Volte (2010) gives a good and long, if poetic, documentation of the traditional method of making charcoal. The Arthur Ransome children's series Swallows and Amazons (particularly the second book, Swallowdale) features carefully drawn vignettes of the lives and the techniques of charcoal burners at the start of the 20th century, in the Lake District of the UK. Antonín Dvořák's opera King and Charcoal Burner is based on a Czech legend about a king who gets lost in a forest and is rescued by a charcoal burner. In Kingdom Come: Deliverance videogame charcoal burning landscapes, structures, and workers of 15th-century Bohemia are widely depicted.

== See also ==
- Biomass briquettes
- Char cloth
- Charcoal in food
- Ember
- Slash-and-char
- Thomas Britton (1644 – 1714), small coal merchant of London, noted for his singing voice.
- Tortillon
