= Biomass briquettes =

Fuel source made from green waste

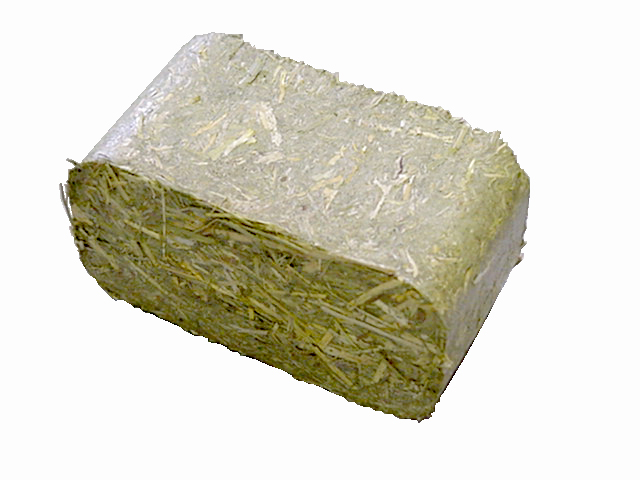
Briquette made by a Ruf briquetter out of hay

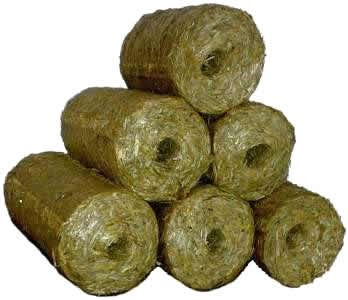
Straw or hay briquettes

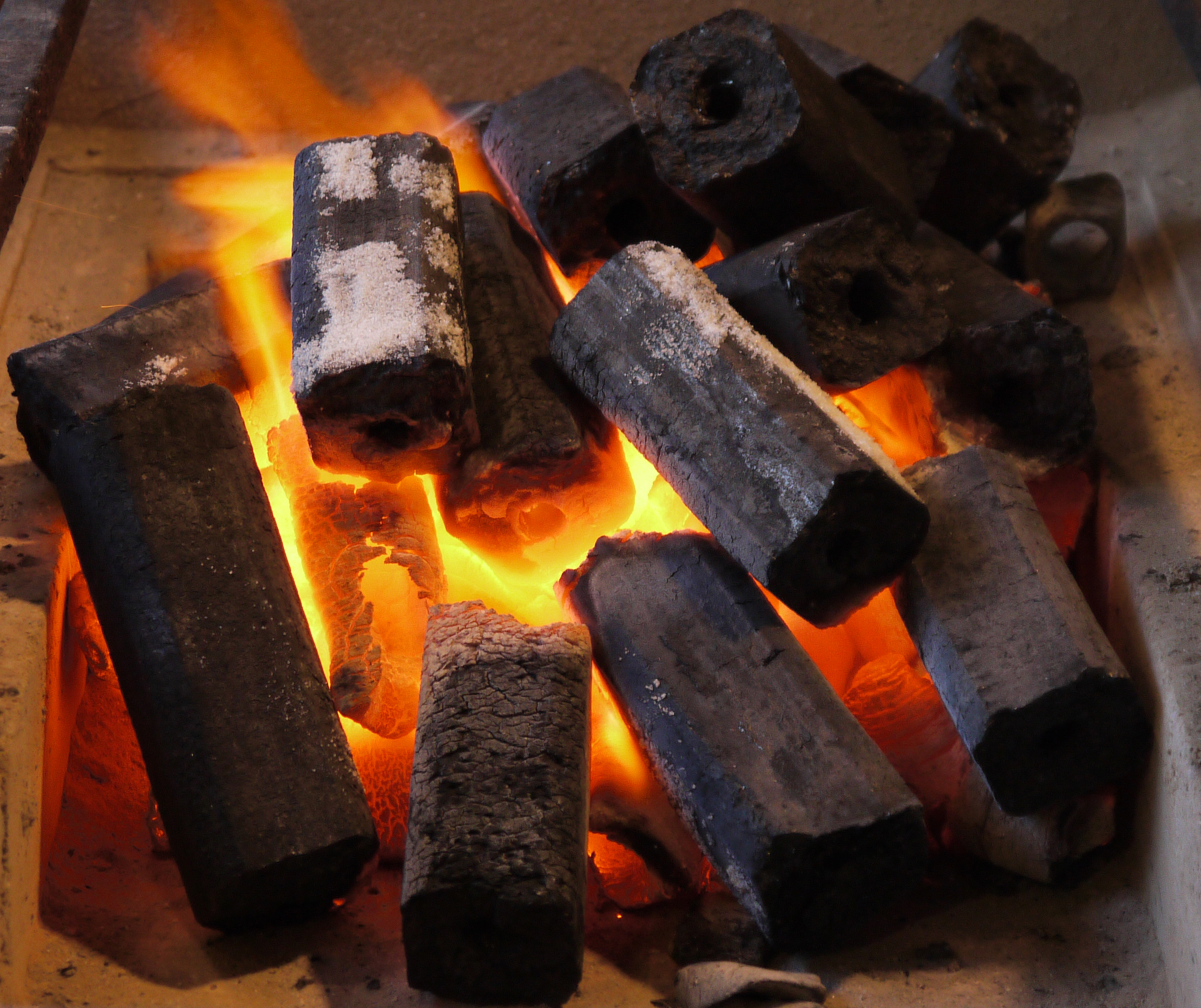
Ogatan, Japanese charcoal briquettes made from sawdust briquettes (Ogalite).

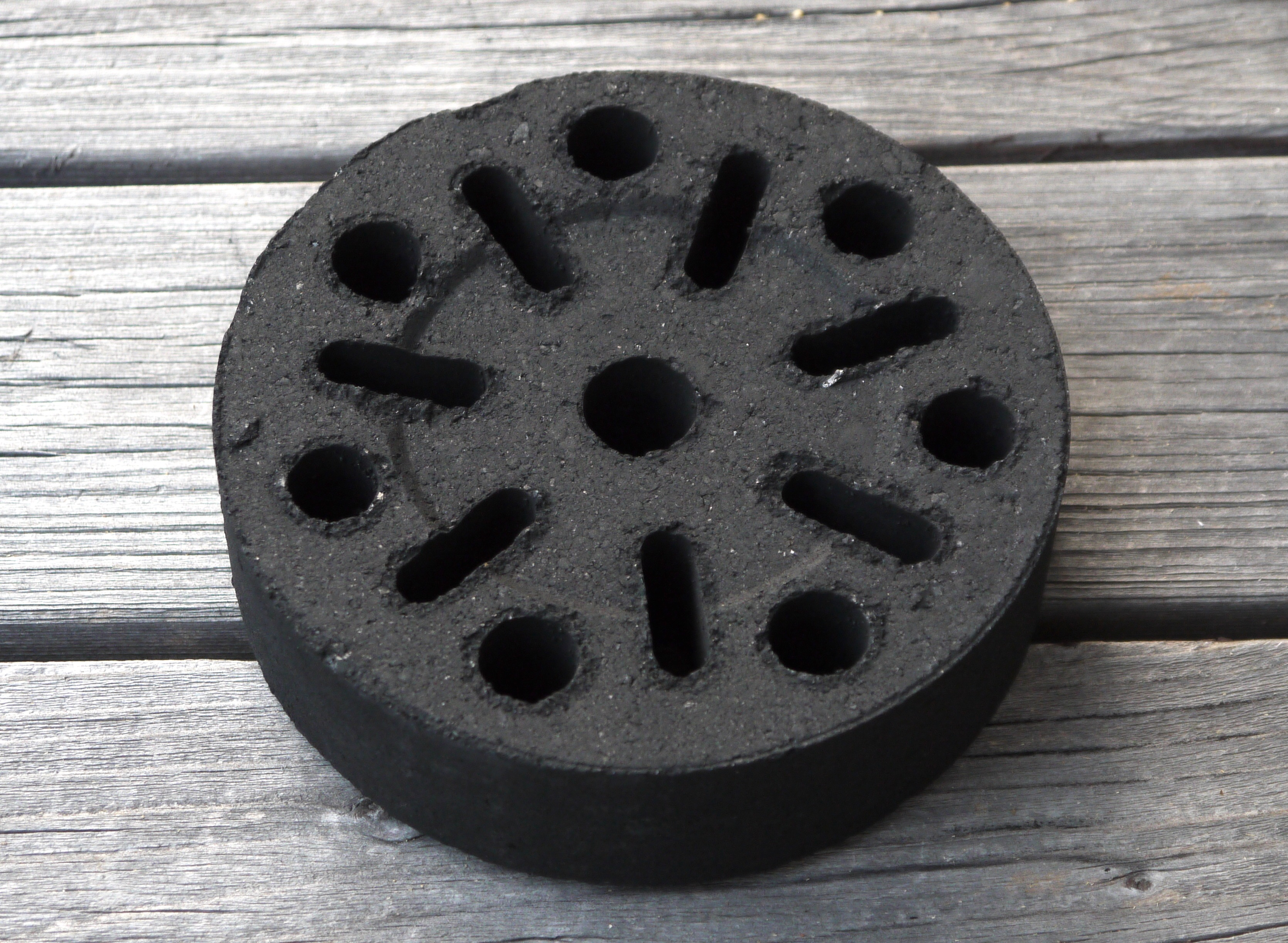
Quick Grill Briquette made from coconut shell

Biomass briquettes are a biofuel substitute made of biodegradable green waste with lower emissions of greenhouses gases and carbon dioxide than traditional fuel sources. This fuel source is used as an alternative for harmful biofuels. Briquettes are used for heating, cooking fuel, and electricity generation usually in developing countries that do not have access to more modern fuel sources. Biomass briquettes have become popular in developed countries due to the accessibility, and eco-friendly impact. The briquettes can be used in the developed countries for producing electricity from steam power by heating water in boilers.

The briquettes are fired with coal in order to create the heat supplied to the boiler. Biomass briquettes are built from recycled green waste, producing less greenhouse gas emissions because the matter has already completed part of the carbon cycle.

== Composition and production ==
Biomass briquettes, mostly made of green waste and other organic materials, are commonly used for electricity generation, heat, and cooking fuel. These compressed compounds contain various organic materials, including rice husk, bagasse, ground nut shells, municipal solid waste, agricultural waste. The composition of the briquettes varies by area due to the availability of raw materials. The raw materials are gathered and compressed into briquette in order to burn longer and make transportation of the goods easier. These briquettes are very different from charcoal because they do not have large concentrations of carbonaceous substances and added materials. Compared to fossil fuels, the briquettes produce low net total greenhouse gas emissions because the materials used are already a part of the carbon cycle.

One of the most common variables of the biomass briquette production process is the way the biomass is dried out. Manufacturers can use torrefaction, carbonization, or varying degrees of pyrolysis. Researchers concluded that torrefaction and carbonization are the most efficient forms of drying out biomass, but the use of the briquette determines which method should be used.

Compaction is another factor affecting production. Some materials burn more efficiently if compacted at low pressures, such as corn stover grind. Other materials such as wheat and barley-straw require high amounts of pressure to produce heat. There are also different press technologies that can be used. A piston press is used to create solid briquettes for a wide array of purposes. Screw extrusion is used to compact biomass into loose, homogeneous briquettes that are substituted for coal in cofiring. This technology creates a toroidal, or doughnut-like, briquette. The hole in the center of the briquette allows for a larger surface area, creating a higher combustion rate.

== History ==
People have been using biomass briquettes in Nepal since before recorded history. Though inefficient, the burning of loose biomass created enough heat for cooking purposes and keeping warm. The first commercial production plant was created in 1982 and produced almost 900 metric tons of biomass. In 1984, factories were constructed that incorporated vast improvements on efficiency and the quality of briquettes. They used a combination of rice husks and molasses. The King Mahendra Trust for Nature Conservation (KMTNC) along with the Institute for Himalayan Conservation (IHC) created a mixture of coal and biomass in 2000 using a unique rolling machine.

=== Japanese Ogalite ===
In 1925, Japan independently started developing technology to harness the energy from sawdust briquettes, known as "Ogalite". Between 1964 and 1969, Japan increased production fourfold by incorporating screw press and piston press technology. The member enterprise of 830 or more existed in the 1960s. The new compaction techniques incorporated in these machines made briquettes of higher quality than those in Europe. As a result, European countries bought the licensing agreements and now manufacture Japanese designed machines.

== Cofiring ==
Cofiring relates to the combustion of two different types of materials. The process is primarily used to decrease CO_{2} emissions despite the resulting lower energy efficiency and higher variable cost. The combination of materials usually contains a high carbon emitting substance such as coal and a lesser CO_{2} emitting material such as biomass. Even though CO_{2} will still be emitted through the combustion of biomass, the net carbon emitted is nearly negligible. This is due to the fact that the material gathered for the composition of the briquettes are still contained in the carbon cycle whereas fossil fuel combustion releases CO_{2} that has been sequestered for millennia. Boilers in power plants are traditionally heated by the combustion of coal, but if cofiring were to be implemented, then the CO_{2} emissions would decrease while still maintaining the heat inputted to the boiler. Implementing cofiring would require few modifications to the current characteristics to power plants, as only the fuel for the boiler would be altered. A moderate investment would be required for implementing biomass briquettes into the combustion process.

Cofiring is considered the most cost-efficient means of biomass. A higher combustion rate will occur when cofiring is implemented in a boiler when compared to burning only biomass. The compressed biomass is also much easier to transport since it is more dense, therefore allowing more biomass to be transported per shipment when compared to loose biomass. Some sources agree that a near-term solution for the greenhouse gas emission problem may lie in cofiring.

== Compared to coal ==
The use of biomass briquettes has been steadily increasing as industries realize the benefits of decreasing pollution through the use of biomass briquettes. Briquettes provide higher calorific value per dollar than coal when used for firing industrial boilers. Along with higher calorific value, biomass briquettes on average saved 30–40% of boiler fuel cost. But other sources suggest that cofiring is more expensive due to the widespread availability of coal and its low cost. However, in the long run, briquettes can only limit the use of coal to a small extent, but it is increasingly being pursued by industries and factories all over the world. Both raw materials can be produced or mined domestically in the United States, creating a fuel source that is free from foreign dependence and less polluting than raw fossil fuel incineration.

Environmentally, the use of biomass briquettes produces much fewer greenhouse gases, specifically, 13.8% to 41.7% CO_{2} and NO_{X}. There was also a reduction from 11.1% to 38.5% in SO_{2} emissions when compared to coal from three different leading producers, EKCC Coal, Decanter Coal, and Alden Coal. Biomass briquettes are also fairly resistant to water degradation, an improvement over the difficulties encountered with the burning of wet coal. However, the briquettes are best used only as a supplement to coal. The use of cofiring creates an energy that is not as high as pure coal, but emits fewer pollutants and cuts down on the release of previously sequestered carbon. The continuous release of carbon and other greenhouse gasses into the atmosphere leads to an increase in global temperatures. The use of cofiring does not stop this process but decreases the relative emissions of coal power plants.

== Use in developing world ==
The Legacy Foundation has developed a set of techniques to produce biomass briquettes through artisanal production in rural villages that can be used for heating and cooking. These techniques were recently pioneered by Virunga National Park in eastern Democratic Republic of Congo, following the massive destruction of the mountain gorilla habitat for charcoal.

Pangani, Tanzania, is an area covered in coconut groves. After harvesting the meat of the coconut, the indigenous people would litter the ground with the husks, believing them to be useless. The husks later became a profit center after it was discovered that coconut husks are well suited to be the main ingredient in bio briquettes. This alternative fuel mixture burns incredibly efficiently and leaves little residue, making it a reliable source for cooking in the undeveloped country. The developing world has always relied on the burning biomass due to its low cost and availability anywhere there is organic material. The briquette production only improves upon the ancient practice by increasing the efficiency of pyrolysis.

Two major components of the developing world are China and India. The economies are rapidly increasing due to cheap ways of harnessing electricity and emitting large amounts of carbon dioxide. The Kyoto Protocol attempted to regulate the emissions of the three different worlds, but there were disagreements as to which country should be penalized for emissions based on its previous and future emissions. The United States is one of the largest emitter per capita but China has recently become the largest single country emitter. The United States had emitted a rigorous amount of carbon dioxide during its development and the developing nations argue that they should not be forced to meet the requirements. At the lower end, the undeveloped nations believe that they have little responsibility for what has been done to the carbon dioxide levels. The major use of biomass briquettes in India, is in industrial applications usually to produce steam. A lot of conversions of boilers from FO to biomass briquettes have happened over the past decade. A vast majority of those projects are registered under CDM (Kyoto Protocol), which allows for users to get carbon credits.

The use of biomass briquettes is strongly encouraged by issuing carbon credits. One carbon credit is equal to one free ton of carbon dioxide to be emitted into the atmosphere. India has started to replace charcoal with biomass briquettes in regards to boiler fuel, especially in the southern parts of the country because the biomass briquettes can be created domestically, depending on the availability of land. Therefore, constantly rising fuel prices will be less influential in an economy if sources of fuel can be easily produced domestically. Lehra Fuel Tech Pvt Ltd is approved by Indian Renewable Energy Development Agency (IREDA), is one of the largest briquetting machine manufacturers from Ludhiana, India.

In the African Great Lakes region, work on biomass briquette production has been spearheaded by a number of NGOs with Energy 4 Impact taking a lead in promoting briquette products and briquette entrepreneurs in the three Great Lakes countries; namely, Kenya, Uganda and Tanzania. This has been achieved by a five-year EU and Dutch government sponsored project called DEEP EA (Developing Energy Enterprises Project East Africa) . The main feed stock for briquettes in the East African region has mainly been charcoal dust although alternative like sawdust, bagasse, coffee husks and rice husks have also been used.

== Use in developed world ==
Coal is the largest carbon dioxide emitter per unit area when it comes to electricity generation. Carbon is also the most common ingredient in charcoal. There has been a recent push to replace the burning of fossil fuels with biomass. The replacement of this nonrenewable resource with biological waste would lower the carbon footprint of grill owners and lower the overall pollution of the world. Citizens are also starting to manufacture briquettes at home. The first machines would create briquettes for homeowners out of compressed sawdust, however, current machines allow for briquette production out of any sort of dried biomass.

Arizona has also taken initiative to turn waste biomass into a source of energy. Waste cotton and pecan material used to provide a nesting ground for bugs that would destroy the new crops in the spring. To stop this problem farmers buried the biomass, which quickly led to soil degradation. These materials were discovered to be a very efficient source of energy and took care of issues that had plagued farms.

The United States Department of Energy has financed several projects to test the viability of biomass briquettes on a national scale. The scope of the projects is to increase the efficiency of gasifiers as well as produce plans for production facilities.

== Criticism ==
Biomass is composed of organic materials, therefore, large amounts of land are required to produce the fuel. Critics argue that the use of this land should be utilized for food distribution rather than crop degradation. Also, climate changes may cause a harsh season, where the material extracted will need to be swapped for food rather than energy. The assumption is that the production of biomass decreases the food supply, causing an increase in world hunger by extracting the organic materials such as corn and soybeans for fuel rather than food.

The burning of biomass briquettes also contributes to poor indoor and outdoor air quality. The organic nature of these fuels means that combustion can contribute to the emission of many hundreds to thousands of compounds in organic aerosol. The burning of biomass briquettes also releases many organic gases, which can react to form ground level ozone and secondary organic aerosol. The combustion of biomass briquettes, such as dried cow dung cakes, has been shown to be a likely contributor to poor air quality, with emissions around 120 times more reactive with the hydroxyl radical than emissions from liquefied petroleum gas.

The cost of implementing a new technology such as biomass into the current infrastructure is also high. The fixed costs with the production of biomass briquettes are high due to the new undeveloped technologies that revolve around the extraction, production and storage of the biomass. Technologies regarding extraction of oil and coal have been developing for decades, becoming more efficient with each year. A new undeveloped technology regarding fuel utilization that has no infrastructure built around makes it nearly impossible to compete in the current market.
