= Walker Charcoal Kiln =

- U.S. National Register of Historic Places
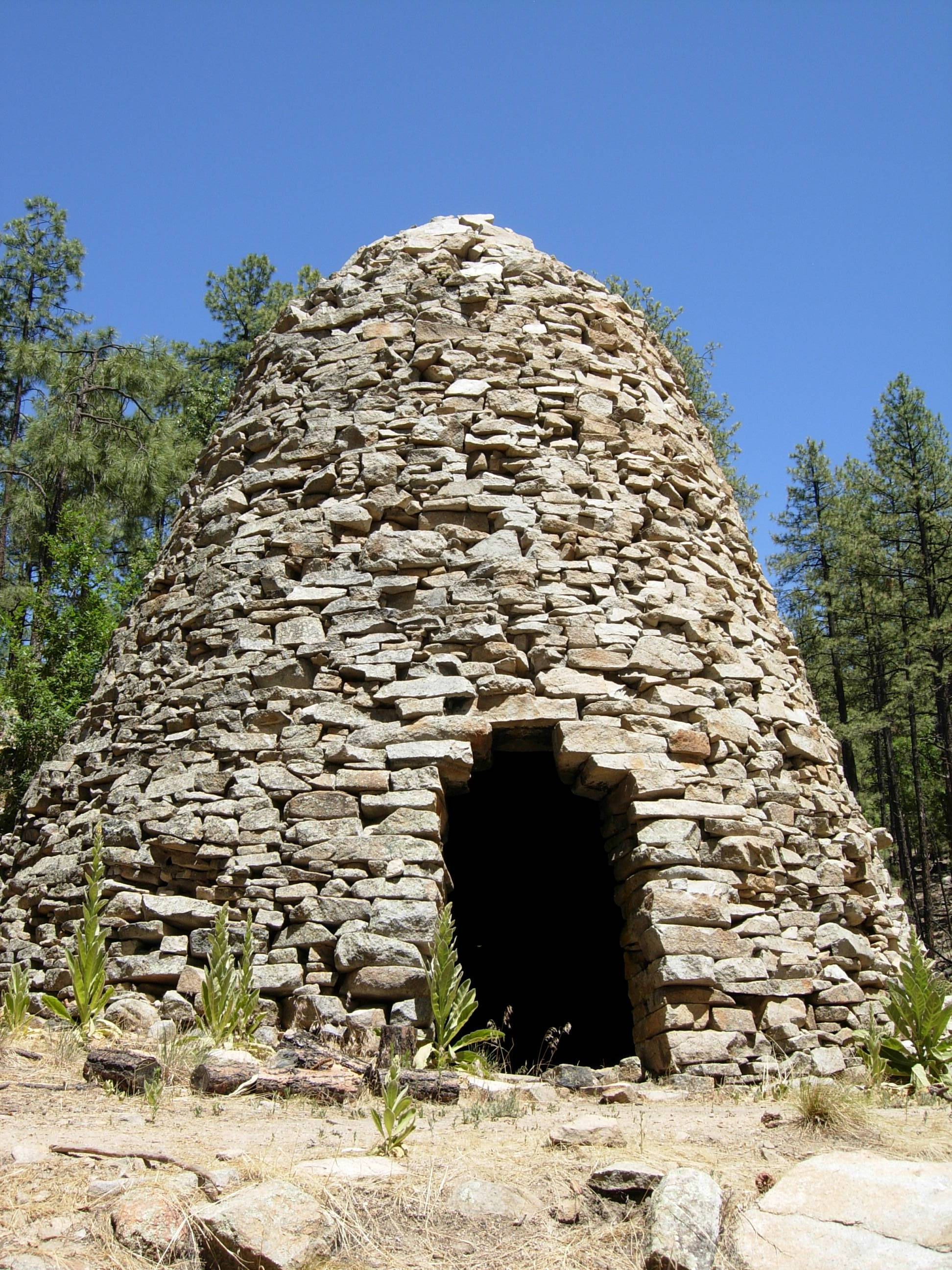

- Location within Arizona Location within the United States
- Nearest city: Prescott, Arizona
- Coordinates: 34°27′30″N 112°22′31″W
- NRHP reference No.: 76000383
- Added to NRHP: October 08, 1976

The Walker Charcoal Kiln is a structure in the Prescott National Forest near the town of Walker, Arizona and situated in the vicinity of the abandoned Poland Junction Mine near the summit of Renegade Hill. It is listed on the National Register of Historic Places. A sign posted near the kiln reads, "This kiln was constructed around 1880 by Jake and Joe Carmichael to convert oak wood into charcoal for use at nearby smelters. The surrounding forest was cut so heavily for charcoal and mine props in the late 1800s that it is just now becoming productive again."

== See also ==
- Bradshaw Mountain Railroad
