= Electric charcoal starter =

Device to ignite charcoal electrically

An electric charcoal starter is an electric heating element designed for igniting charcoal without kindling. It may be simply a heater loop that is inserted into a pile of charcoal, or may include a pot for holding the charcoal. Electric starters are "virtually fool-proof", but do require a source of electricity.

== See also ==
- Chimney starter, another charcoal lighting system
- Charcoal lighter fluid
