= Start a Fire =

Start a Fire may refer to:

- Start a Fire (Neon Trees EP)
- Start a Fire (BP Rania EP)
- "Start a Fire" (Tiffany Affair song), 2006
- "Start a Fire" (Ryan Star song), 2010
- "Start a Fire" (Dilara Kazimova song), 2014
- "Start a Fire" (Lil Wayne song), 2014
- "Start a Fire" (Margaret song), 2014, the official song of the 2014 FIVB Volleyball Men's World Championship
- "Start a Fire", a song in the La La Land soundtrack, 2016
- "Start a Fire", a song by Audio Adrenaline from Worldwide, 2003
- "Start a Fire", a song by Unspoken from their self-titled debut album, 2014

== See also ==
- Firelighting, the process of artificially starting a fire
- Arson, crime of intentionally or maliciously igniting a fire
- Pyromania, disorder of pleasure to start fires
- Started a Fire, album by British band One Night Only
- How to Start a Fire, album by Further Seems Forever
- Start the Fire (disambiguation)
- Firestarter (disambiguation)
