= Sugar charcoal =

Pure form of carbon produced from sugar

Sugar charcoal is formed by the charring of cane sugar, which was repeatedly recrystallized to remove any organic impurities. It is also prepared by the dehydration of sugar in the presence of concentrated sulfuric acid. The sulfuric acid is such a strong dehydrating agent that it abstracts water from the sugar molecules themselves and leaves behind black residue of carbon (i.e. the general formula for sugars is C_{x}(H_{2}O)_{x} and it is this water that is removed with only carbon remaining). It is the purest form of amorphous carbon.

== Use ==
Since sugar charcoal is a method of producing very pure carbon it is used to prepare artificial diamonds. When heated strongly at high temperature (3000-3500 °C) and high pressure, it is converted into an artificial diamond.

It is used as a reducing agent in the process of extraction of metals.

Sugar charcoal has decolourizing properties, which means it removes some dyes, such as methylene blue, from water. Note: this is not a chemical bleaching process, but rather a physical process. The dyes are adsorbed into the pores and onto the surface of the charcoal particles, thereby removing them from solution.
