= Cofiring =

Combustion of two different fuels in the same combustion system

Co-firing (or cofiring, also referred to as complementary firing or co-combustion) is the combustion of two different fuels in the same combustion system. Fuels can be solid fuels, liquid fuels or gaseous, and its source either fossil or renewable. Therefore, use of heavy fuel oil assisting coal power stations may technically be considered co-firing. The term co-firing was popularized in the 1980s and then referred specifically to the use of waste solid residues (paper, plastic, solvents, tars, etc.) or biomass in coal power stations that were designed only for the combustion of coal.
