= Start the Fire =

Start the Fire may refer to:

- "Start the Fire" (Alcazar song), 2005
- "Start the Fire" (Tarkan song), 2006

== See also ==
- Firelighting, the process of artificially starting a fire
- Arson, crime of intentionally or maliciously igniting a fire
- Pyromania, disorder of pleasure to start fires
- "We Didn't Start the Fire", song by Billy Joel
- Firestarter (disambiguation)
- Start a Fire (disambiguation)
