= Chimney starter =

Firemaking device

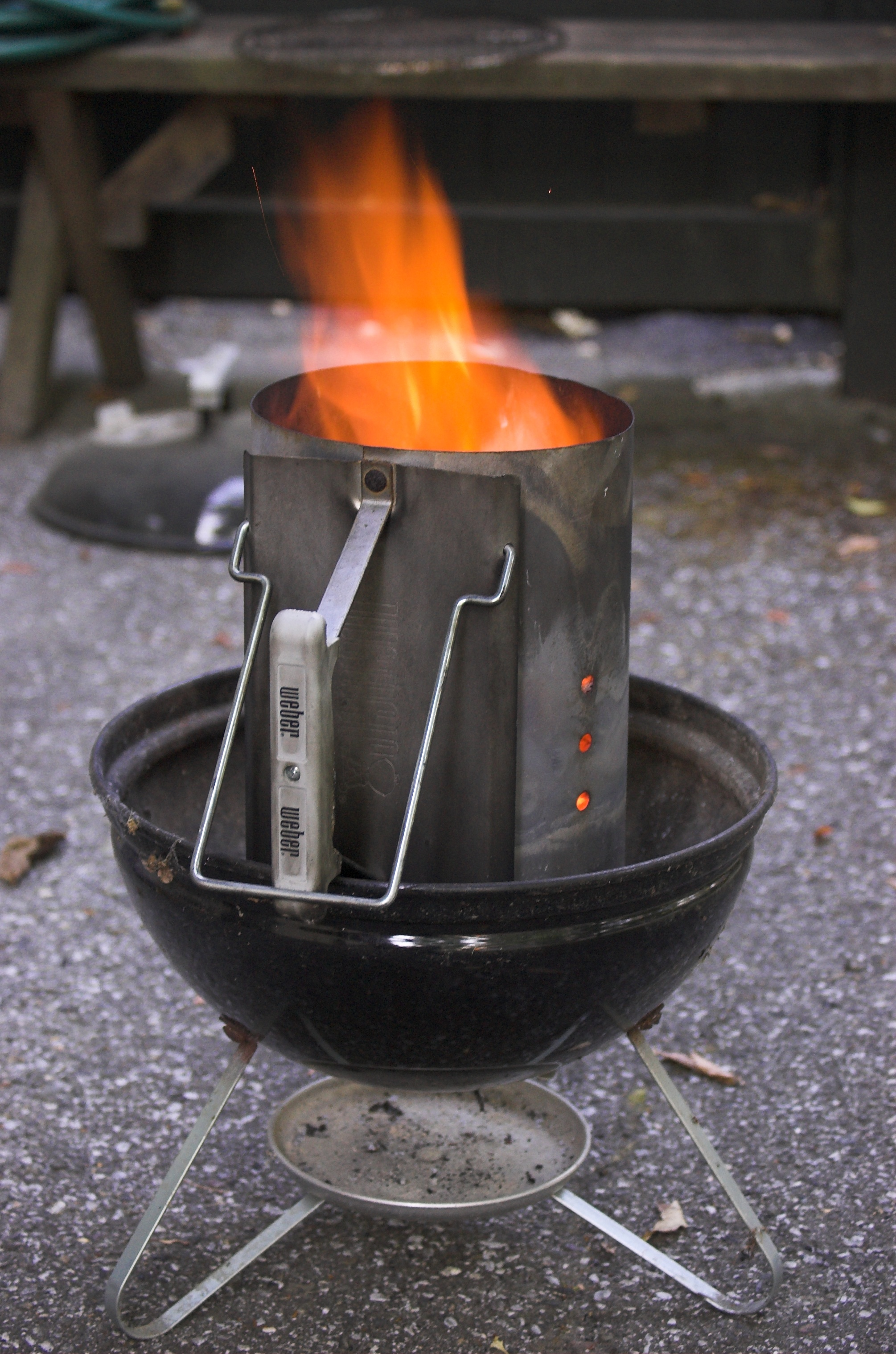
A standard commercial chimney starter

A chimney starter or charcoal chimney is a fire making device for igniting charcoal lumps or briquettes. It consists of a metal tube with a grate to hold charcoal. A lighting cone is a similar, conical, device placed over an existing grate. The tube is typically cylindrical, but may also have other cross-sections. The tube may also be made of combustible material designed to resist burning long enough for the coals to ignite.

Modern commercial models are sheet steel cylinders 6–8 in (15–20 cm) in diameter and 8–12.5 in (20–32 cm) high. Inside, a flat or conical grate holds charcoal 3 in (8 cm) from the bottom. Large holes around the bottom let air in. Modern commercial chimneys generally have insulated handles.

== History ==
Patent drawing of a 1910 design

A 1910 British design for a cylindrical metal portable stove is described as "also applicable for use as a Fire Lighter" and describes the use of paper kindling below a conical grate, with wood or coal above it.

A 1917 design closely resembles a modern chimney starter: a metal cylinder with a raised grate and air holes below the grate. However, it is not described as a fire starter, but as a "camp stove".

Home-made versions in the 1950s, called kindle cans, were often made from metal coffee, fruit juice, or motor oil cans with ventilation holes punched with a can opener or tin snip. Some designs had a grate. They often did not have handles, and needed to be handled with tongs.

Patent drawing (1965) of a chimney starter

Various kinds of chimney starter have been patented over the years.

== Design considerations ==
Chimney starters essentially work by increasing the draft, supplying more oxygen to the coals. Taller starters are more effective than shorter ones. In empirical studies of lighting cones for Haitian charcoal stoves (which are placed over a grate rather than having an integrated grate), the ignition time and charcoal consumption were halved compared to lighting on a shallow bed grate, and carbon monoxide production was reduced by 40%. The cone also protected the charcoal from the wind, and helped direct the smoke away from users.

== Using a chimney starter ==
The chimney starter is used by placing kindling—typically crumpled newspaper—under the grate and charcoal over it. When the kindling is lit, it ignites the charcoal and creates a draft. Since the coals are held together, radiation heats adjacent coals, and convection heats coals higher in the stack. Once all the charcoal is burning (glowing red on the bottom and ashed over on the top), the chimney is lifted by its handle and the burning charcoal dumped into the grill.

If some burning charcoal remains in the chimney, adding new charcoal will quickly ignite it.

== Cooking ==
One can also cook directly over the chimney starter with an additional top grate. This provides high-intensity heat for fast searing.

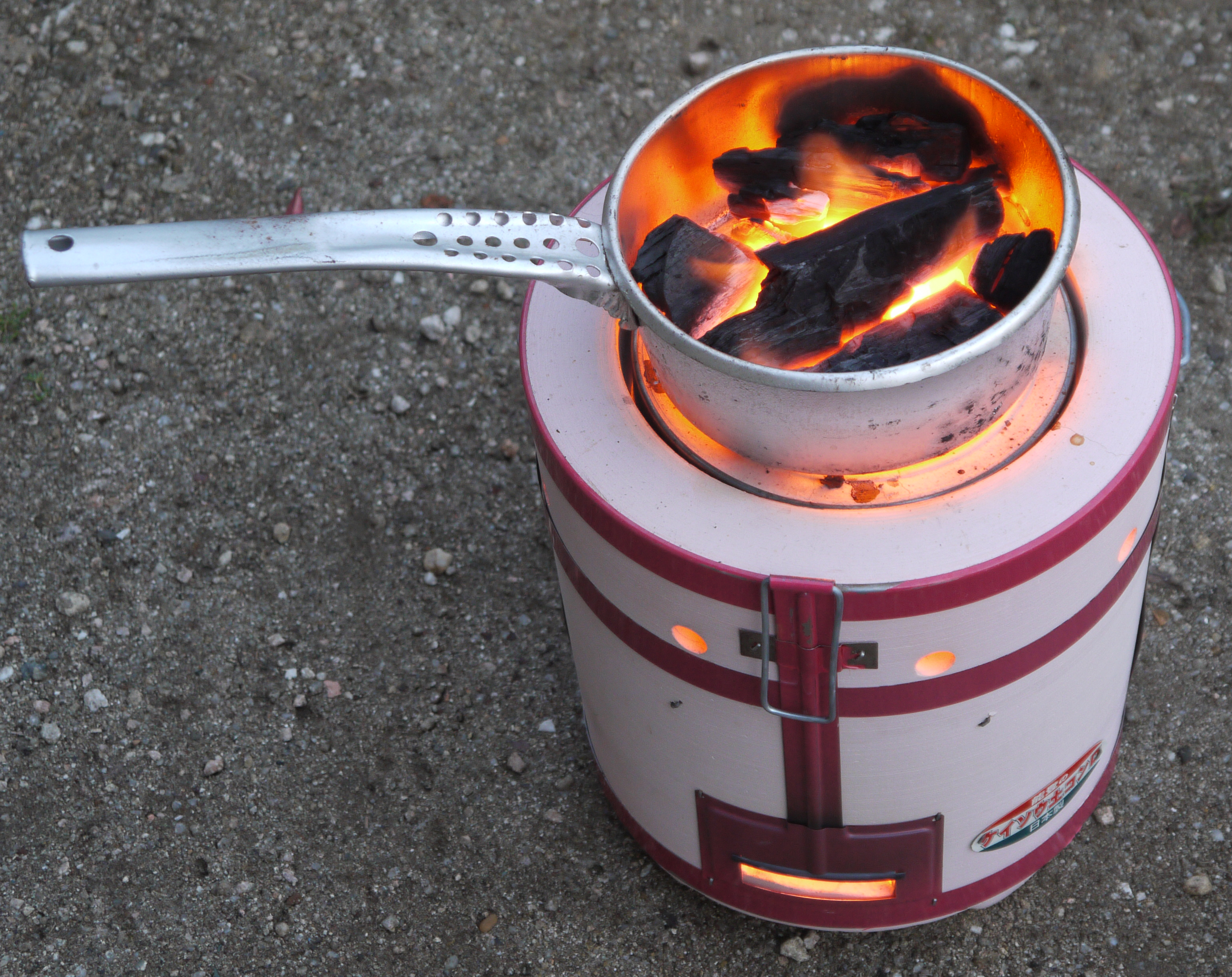
Japanese fire starter

== See also ==
- Charcoal lighter fluid, another fire starting aid
- Electric charcoal starter
