= Charcoal lighter fluid =

Aliphatic petroleum solvent used in lighting charcoal in a barbecue grill

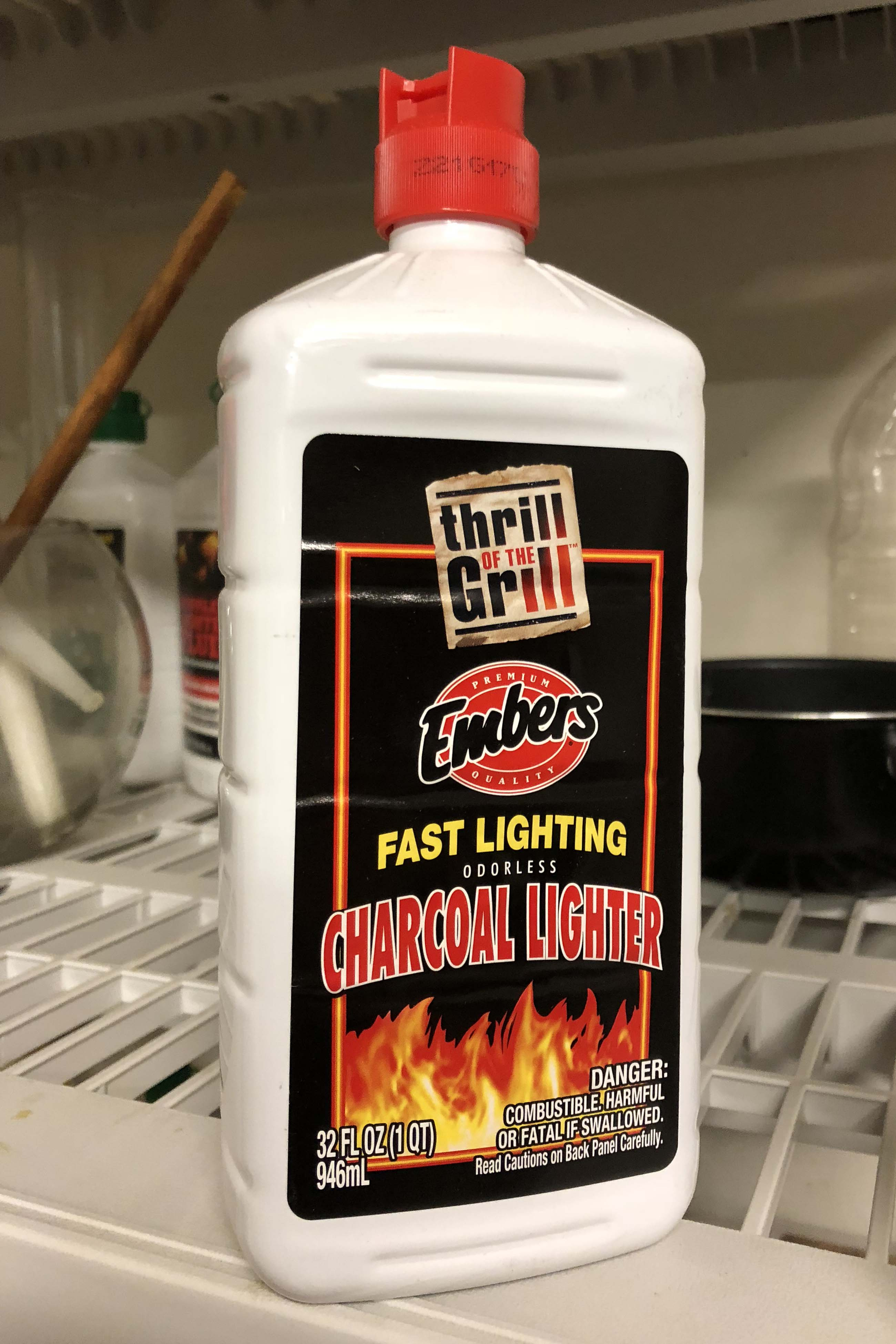
Embers Charcoal Lighter Fluid

Charcoal lighter fluid is a flammable fluid used to accelerate the ignition of charcoal in a barbecue grill. It can either be petroleum based (e.g., mineral spirits) or alcohol based (usually methanol or ethanol). It can be used both with lump charcoal and briquettes. Lighter-fluid-infused briquettes that eliminate the need for separate application of lighter fluid are available. The use of lighter fluid is somewhat controversial as the substance is combustible, harmful or fatal if swallowed, and may impart an unpleasant flavor to food cooked upon fires lit with it.

The sale of petroleum-based charcoal lighter fluid is regulated in some jurisdictions due to its potential to cause photochemical smog through evaporation of its volatile organic compounds. The South Coast Air Quality Management District requires that all charcoal lighter fluids sold in its jurisdiction (essentially Southern California) meet the air quality standards set forth in District Rule 1174. Common substitutes to aid in the starting of charcoal fires are chimney and electric fire starters.

In former Soviet countries, the alcohol-based lighter fluid is sometimes consumed as a surrogate alcohol among very poor alcoholics because of its cheap price compared to vodka, just as it is with Troynoy Eau de Cologne. Lighter fluid is poisonous and should never be consumed.

Charcoal lighter fluid, known as LF-1, was used in the Pratt & Whitney J57 engine, which powered the Lockheed U-2 aircraft. With an additive to improve thermal oxidative stability, it was covered by a military specification and known as Thermally Stable Jet Fuel, JPTS.
