= Bolboceras insulare =

Scientific classification
- Kingdom: Animalia
- Phylum: Arthropoda
- Class: Insecta
- Order: Coleoptera
- Family: Bolboceratidae
- Genus: Bolboceras
- Species: B. insulare

Binomial name
- Bolboceras insulare Krikken, 2013

Species of beetle

Bolboceras insulare, is a species of dor beetle found in India, and Sri Lanka.

== Description ==
This species has an average length of about 9 to 10 mm.
