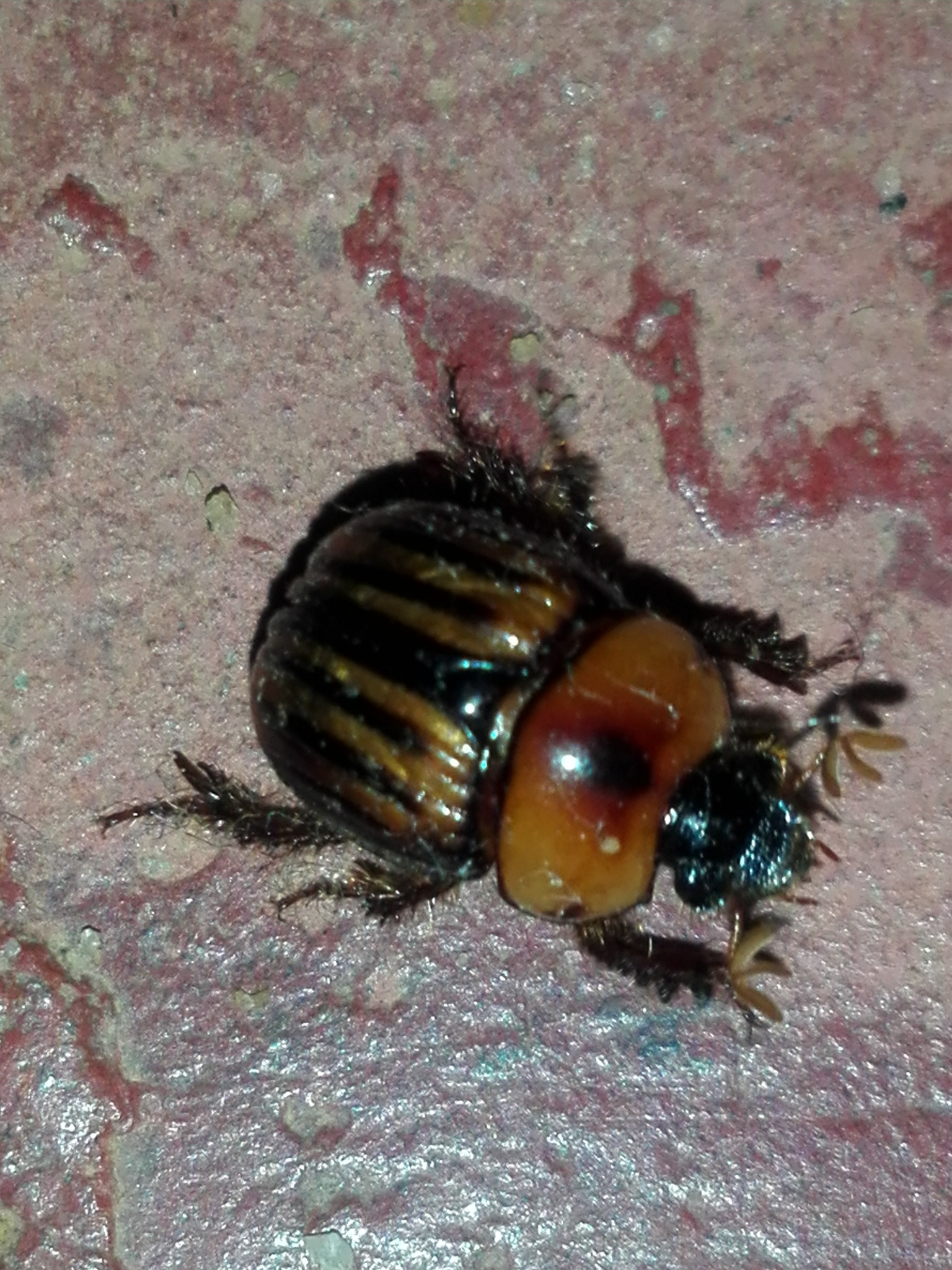
- Bolbochromus lineatus, Sri Lanka

Scientific classification
- Kingdom: Animalia
- Phylum: Arthropoda
- Class: Insecta
- Order: Coleoptera
- Suborder: Polyphaga
- Infraorder: Scarabaeiformia
- Family: Bolboceratidae
- Subfamily: Bolboceratinae
- Tribe: Bolbochromini
- Genus: Bolbochromus
- Species: B. lineatus

Binomial name
- Bolbochromus lineatus (Westwood, 1848)

Synonyms
- Bolboceras lineatus Westwood, 1848

= Bolbochromus lineatus =

Species of beetle

Bolbochromus lineatus is a species of dor beetle endemic to Sri Lanka.
