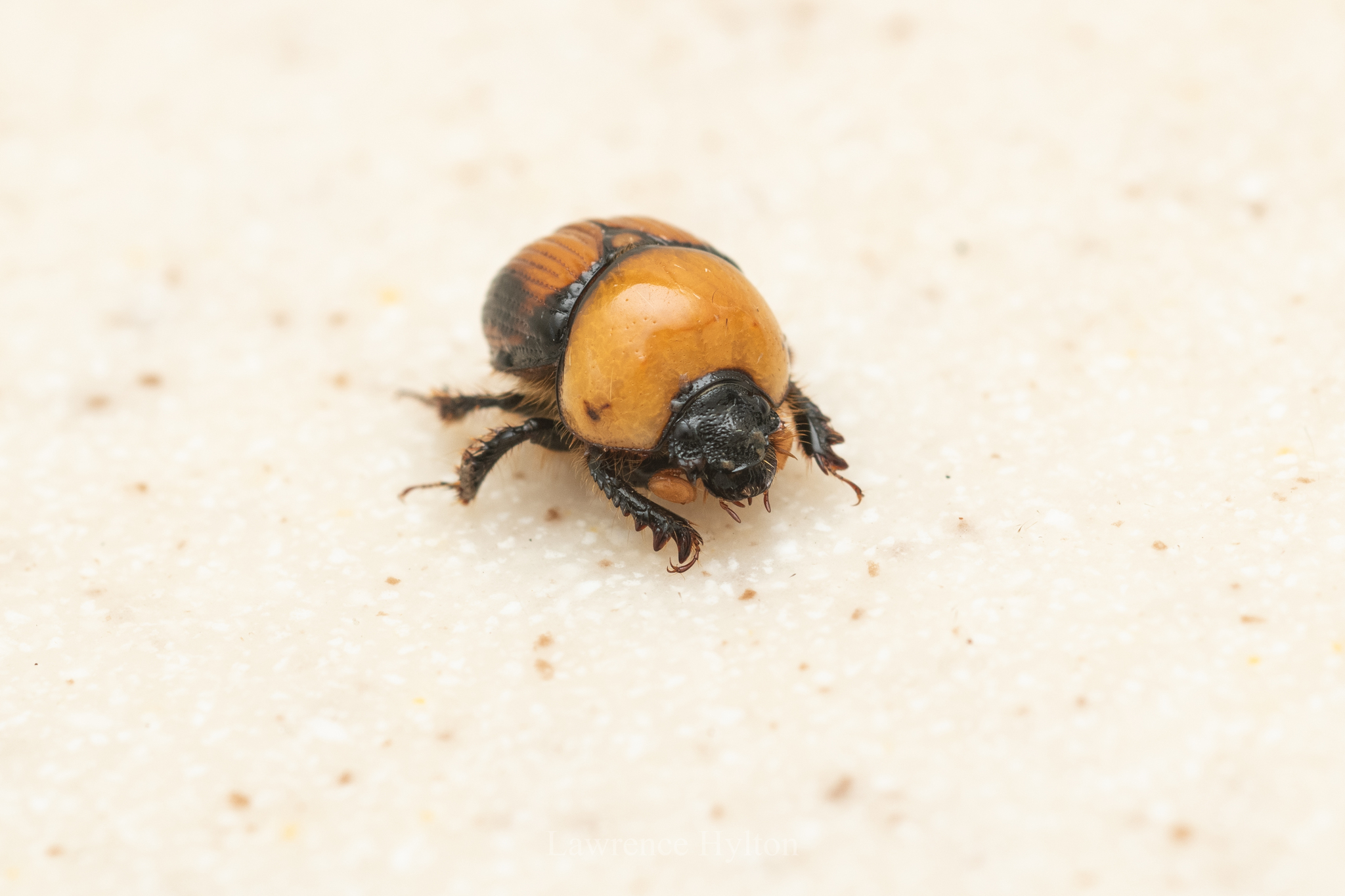
- Bolbochromus laetus, China

Scientific classification
- Kingdom: Animalia
- Phylum: Arthropoda
- Class: Insecta
- Order: Coleoptera
- Suborder: Polyphaga
- Infraorder: Scarabaeiformia
- Family: Bolboceratidae
- Subfamily: Bolboceratinae
- Tribe: Bolbochromini
- Genus: Bolbochromus
- Species: B. laetus

Binomial name
- Bolbochromus laetus (Westwood, 1852)

Synonyms
- Bolboceras laetus Westwood, 1852

= Bolbochromus laetus =

Species of beetle

Bolbochromus laetus, is a species of dor beetle found in Thailand, Indochina, south China, and possibly in India, Sri Lanka, Myanmar and Vietnam.

== Description ==
This species has an average length of about 5.8 to 10.0 mm. Dorsal surface glossy, and black to dark reddish brown in color. Head coarsely punctate. Frontal horn small to reduced. Antennal club with mostly glabrous first antennomere. Eye small dorsally, with broadened and rounded canthus. Frontal horn situated at middle between canthi. Pronotum entirely brownish yellow. Pronotum possesses anterior slightly quadrituberculate carina. Elytra entirely brownish yellow or black, where the disc is surrounded by blackish markings.
