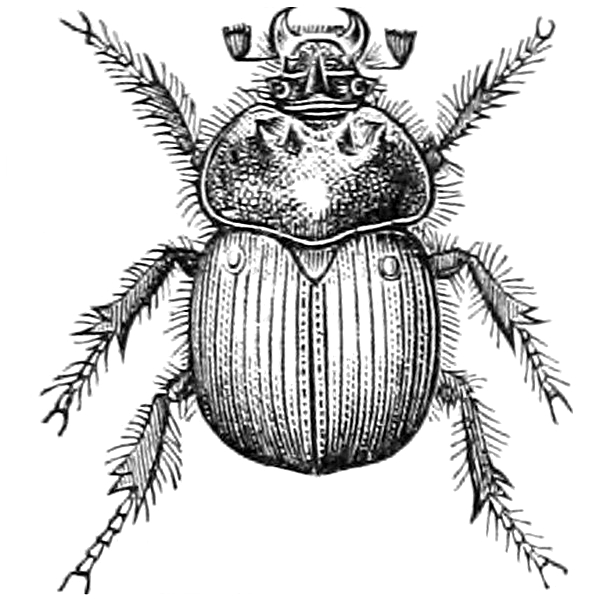
- Bolbelasmus hornii, drawn in 1886

Scientific classification
- Kingdom: Animalia
- Phylum: Arthropoda
- Clade: Pancrustacea
- Class: Insecta
- Order: Coleoptera
- Suborder: Polyphaga
- Infraorder: Scarabaeiformia
- Superfamily: Scarabaeoidea
- Family: Bolboceratidae
- Subfamily: Bolboceratinae
- Tribe: Bolboceratini
- Genus: Bolbelasmus
- Species: B. hornii

Binomial name
- Bolbelasmus hornii (Rivers, 1886)

= Bolbelasmus hornii =

Species of beetle

Bolbelasmus hornii is a species of earth-boring scarab beetle in the family Bolboceratidae. It is found in North America.
