= Bradycinetulus fossatus =

Scientific classification
- Domain: Eukaryota
- Kingdom: Animalia
- Phylum: Arthropoda
- Class: Insecta
- Order: Coleoptera
- Suborder: Polyphaga
- Infraorder: Scarabaeiformia
- Family: Bolboceratidae
- Genus: Bradycinetulus
- Species: B. fossatus

Binomial name
- Bradycinetulus fossatus (Haldeman, 1853)

Species of beetle

Bradycinetulus fossatus is a species of earth-boring scarab beetle in the family Geotrupidae. It is found in North America.
