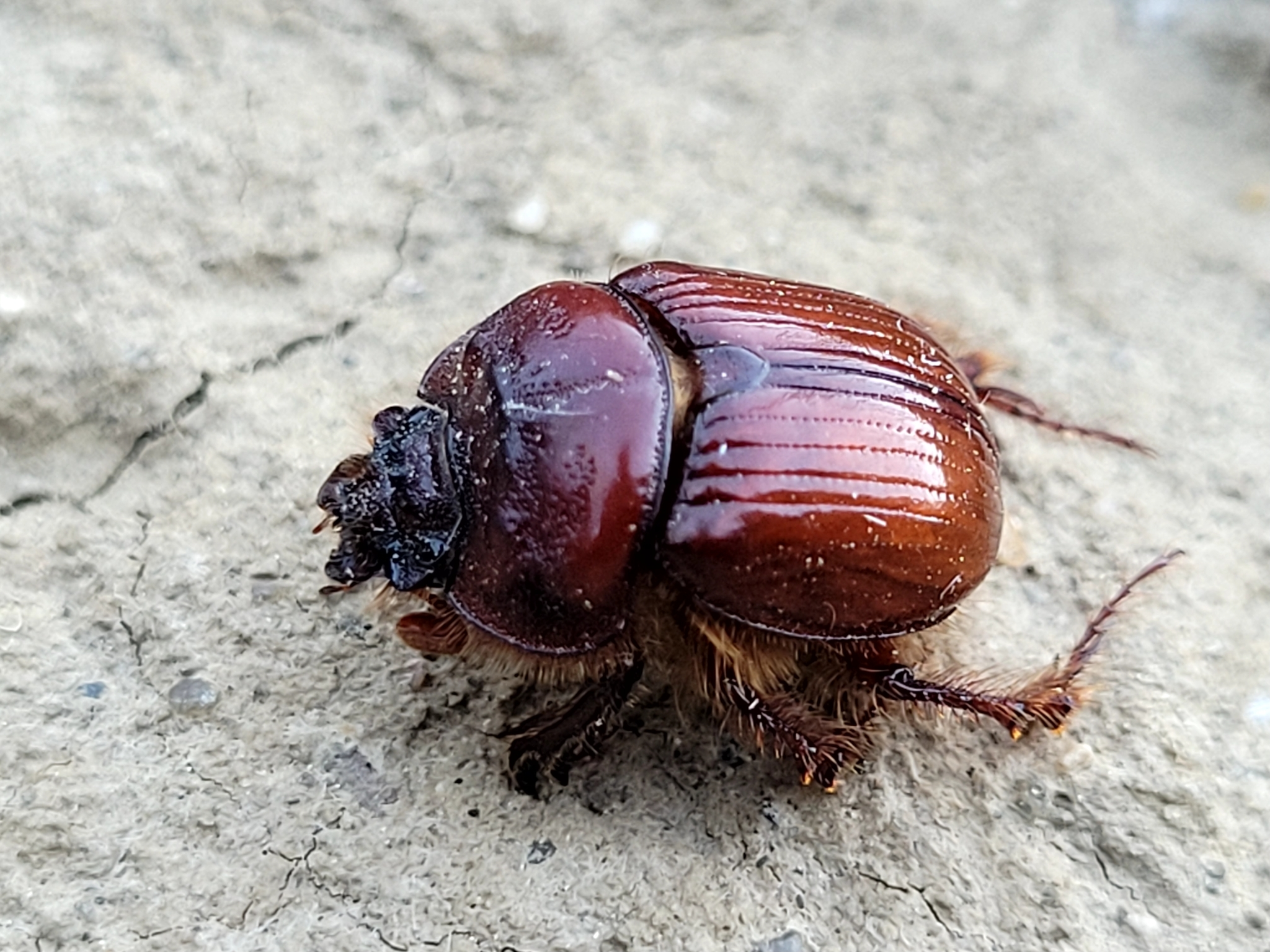

Scientific classification
- Domain: Eukaryota
- Kingdom: Animalia
- Phylum: Arthropoda
- Class: Insecta
- Order: Coleoptera
- Suborder: Polyphaga
- Infraorder: Scarabaeiformia
- Family: Bolboceratidae
- Genus: Eucanthus
- Species: E. greeni

Binomial name
- Eucanthus greeni Robinson, 1948

= Eucanthus greeni =

Species of beetle

Eucanthus greeni is a species of earth-boring scarab beetle in the family Geotrupidae. It is found in North America.
