= Bolbocerosoma lepidissimum =

Scientific classification
- Domain: Eukaryota
- Kingdom: Animalia
- Phylum: Arthropoda
- Class: Insecta
- Order: Coleoptera
- Suborder: Polyphaga
- Infraorder: Scarabaeiformia
- Family: Bolboceratidae
- Genus: Bolbocerosoma
- Species: B. lepidissimum

Binomial name
- Bolbocerosoma lepidissimum Brown, 1928

Species of beetle

Bolbocerosoma lepidissimum is a species of earth-boring scarab beetle in the family Geotrupidae. It is found in North America.
