= Bradycinetulus ferrugineus =

Scientific classification
- Domain: Eukaryota
- Kingdom: Animalia
- Phylum: Arthropoda
- Class: Insecta
- Order: Coleoptera
- Suborder: Polyphaga
- Infraorder: Scarabaeiformia
- Family: Bolboceratidae
- Genus: Bradycinetulus
- Species: B. ferrugineus

Binomial name
- Bradycinetulus ferrugineus (Palisot de Beauvois, 1809)

Synonyms
- Bolboceras furcicollis Laporte, 1840

Species of beetle

Bradycinetulus ferrugineus is a species of earth-boring scarab beetle in the family Geotrupidae. It is found in North America.
