= Bolbocerosoma pusillum =

Scientific classification
- Domain: Eukaryota
- Kingdom: Animalia
- Phylum: Arthropoda
- Class: Insecta
- Order: Coleoptera
- Suborder: Polyphaga
- Infraorder: Scarabaeiformia
- Family: Bolboceratidae
- Genus: Bolbocerosoma
- Species: B. pusillum

Binomial name
- Bolbocerosoma pusillum Dawson & Mccolloch, 1924

Species of beetle

Bolbocerosoma pusillum is a species of beetle in the family Bolboceratidae. It is found in North America.

== Subspecies ==
- Bolbocerosoma pusillum pusillum Dawson and McColloch, 1924
- Bolbocerosoma pusillum townesi Howden, 1955
