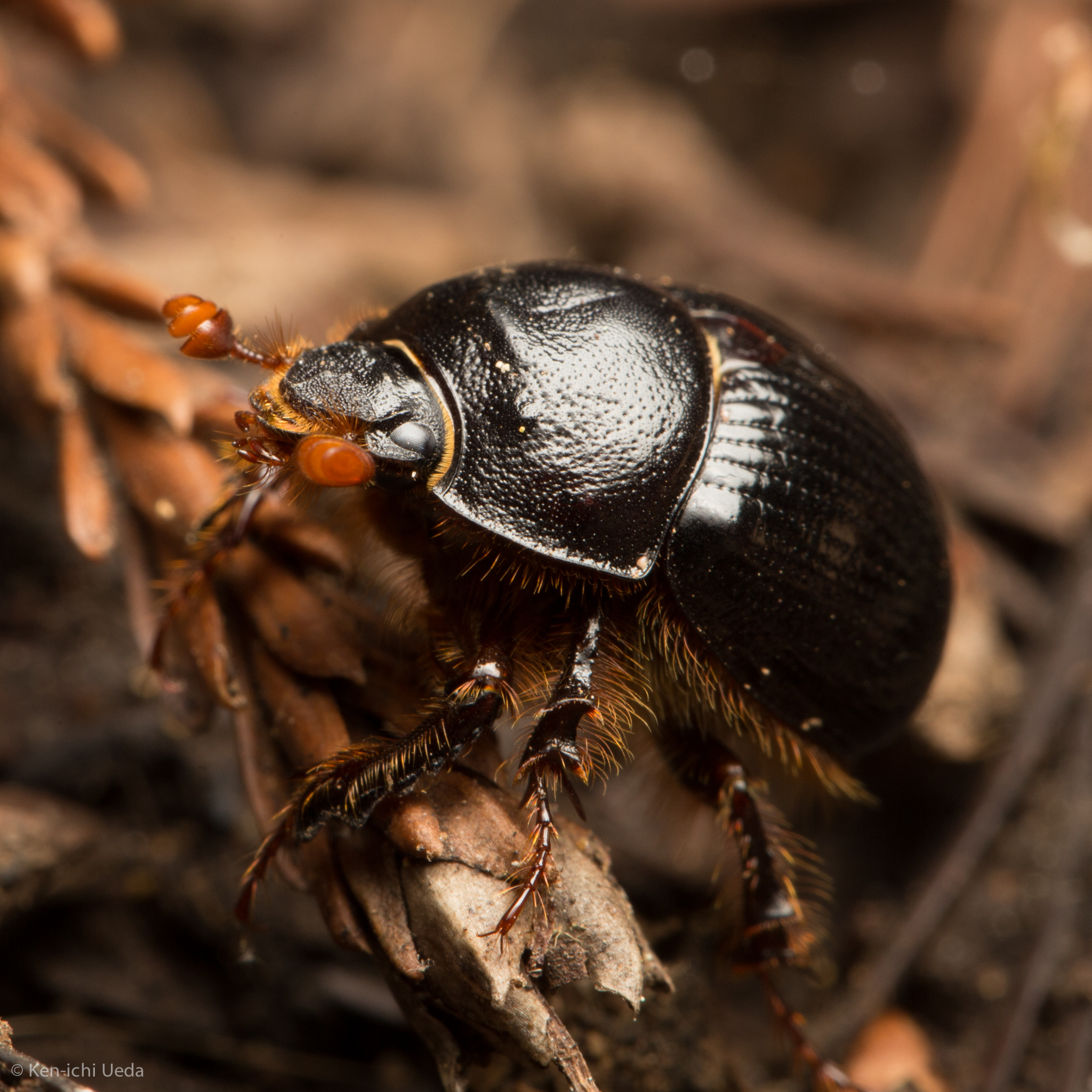

Scientific classification
- Domain: Eukaryota
- Kingdom: Animalia
- Phylum: Arthropoda
- Class: Insecta
- Order: Coleoptera
- Suborder: Polyphaga
- Infraorder: Scarabaeiformia
- Family: Bolboceratidae
- Genus: Odonteus
- Species: O. obesus

Binomial name
- Odonteus obesus (Leconte, 1859)

= Odonteus obesus =

Species of beetle

Odonteus obesus is a species of earth-boring scarab beetle in the family Bolboceratidae. It is found in North America.
