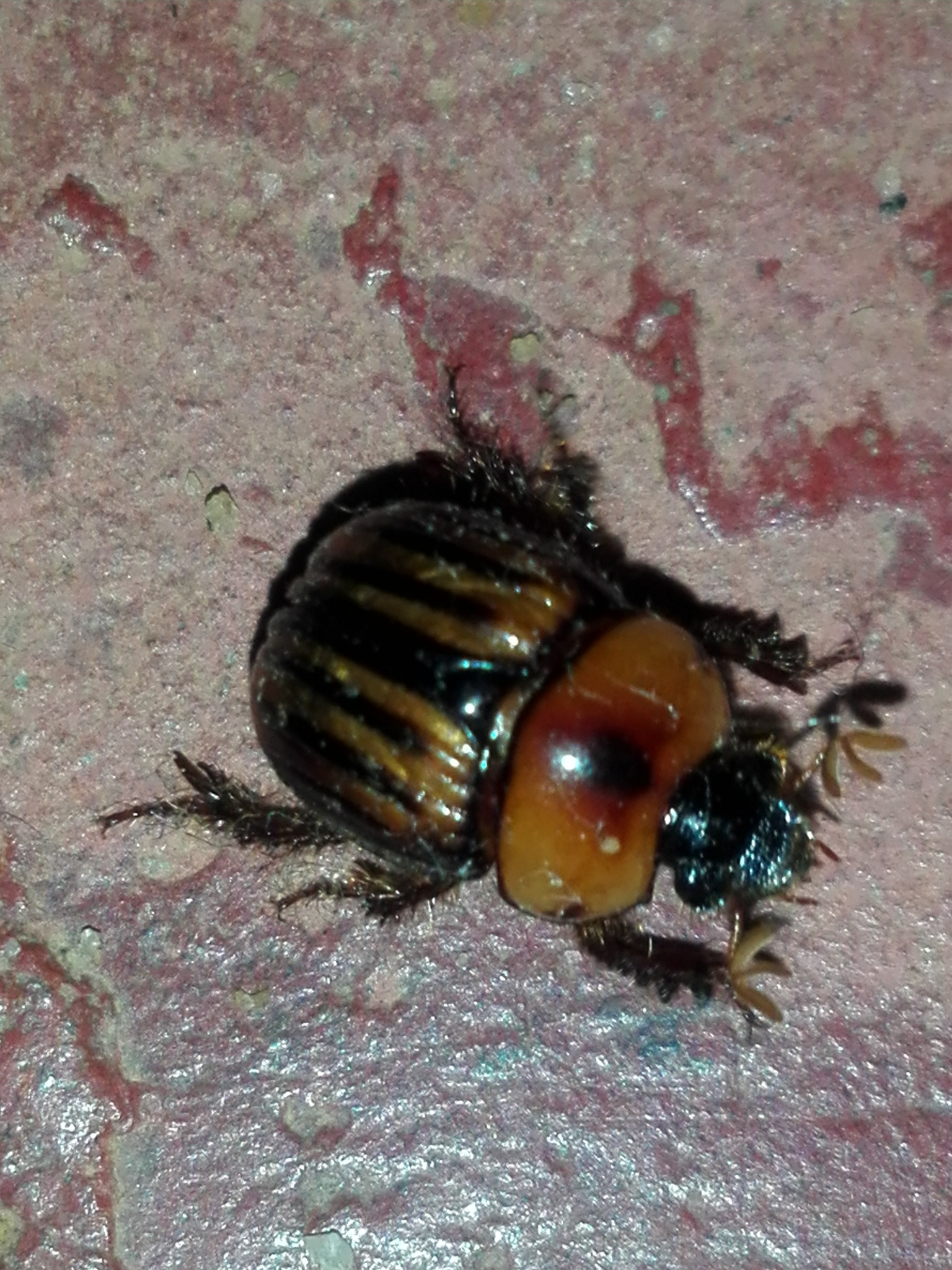
- Bolbochromus lineatus, Sri Lanka

Scientific classification
- Domain: Eukaryota
- Kingdom: Animalia
- Phylum: Arthropoda
- Class: Insecta
- Order: Coleoptera
- Suborder: Polyphaga
- Infraorder: Scarabaeiformia
- Family: Bolboceratidae
- Subfamily: Bolboceratinae
- Tribe: Bolbochromini
- Genus: Bolbochromus; Boucomont, 1909

Subgenera
- Bolbochromops Krikken & Li, 2013; Bolbochromus Boucomont, 1909; Metabolbochromus Krikken & Li, 2013

Synonyms
- Bolbochromops Krikken & Li, 2013; Metabolbochromus Krikken & Li, 2013

= Bolbochromus =

Genus of beetles

Bolbochromus is a genus of earth-boring dung beetles in the family Geotrupidae. There are more than 25 described species in Bolbochromus.

== Species ==
These 27 species belong to the genus Bolbochromus:

- Bolbochromus catenatus (Lansberge, 1886) (Southeast Asia)
- Bolbochromus celebensis Boucomont, 1914 (Indonesia)
- Bolbochromus dumogensis Krikken & Li, 2013 (Indonesia))
- Bolbochromus hirokawai Ochi, Kon & Kawahara, 2010 (Philippines)
- Bolbochromus jengi Krikken & Li, 2019 (Philippines)
- Bolbochromus laetus (Westwood, 1852) (Southeast Asia)
- Bolbochromus lao Keith, 2012 (Laos)
- Bolbochromus lineatus (Westwood, 1848) (Sri Lanka)
- Bolbochromus ludekingi (Lansberge, 1886) (Indonesia)
- Bolbochromus luzonensis Krikken & Li, 2019 (Philippines)
- Bolbochromus malayensis Li & Krikken, 2013 (Malaysia)
- Bolbochromus masumotoi Ochi, Kon & Kawahara, 2011 (Cambodia)
- Bolbochromus mindanaicus Krikken & Li, 2013 (Philippines)
- Bolbochromus minutus Li & Krikken, 2013 (Thailand)
- Bolbochromus niger Pouillaude, 1914 (Indonesia)
- Bolbochromus nigerrimus (Westwood, 1852) (India)
- Bolbochromus nigriceps (Wiedemann, 1823) (Indonesia)
- Bolbochromus nomurai Li & Krikken, 2013 (Vietnam, China)
- Bolbochromus plagiatus (Westwood, 1852) (India)
- Bolbochromus posticalis (Westwood, 1852) (India)
- Bolbochromus pumilus Krikken & Li, 2013 (India)
- Bolbochromus ryukyuensis Masumoto, 1984 (Japan, Taiwan)
- Bolbochromus setosifrons Li & Wang, 2019 (Philippines)
- Bolbochromus sinensis Krikken & Li, 2013 (China)
- Bolbochromus sulcicollis (Wiedemann, 1819) (Indonesia)
- Bolbochromus tricostatus Selking, 2019 (Philippines)
- Bolbochromus walshi Pouillaude, 1914 (Indonesia)
