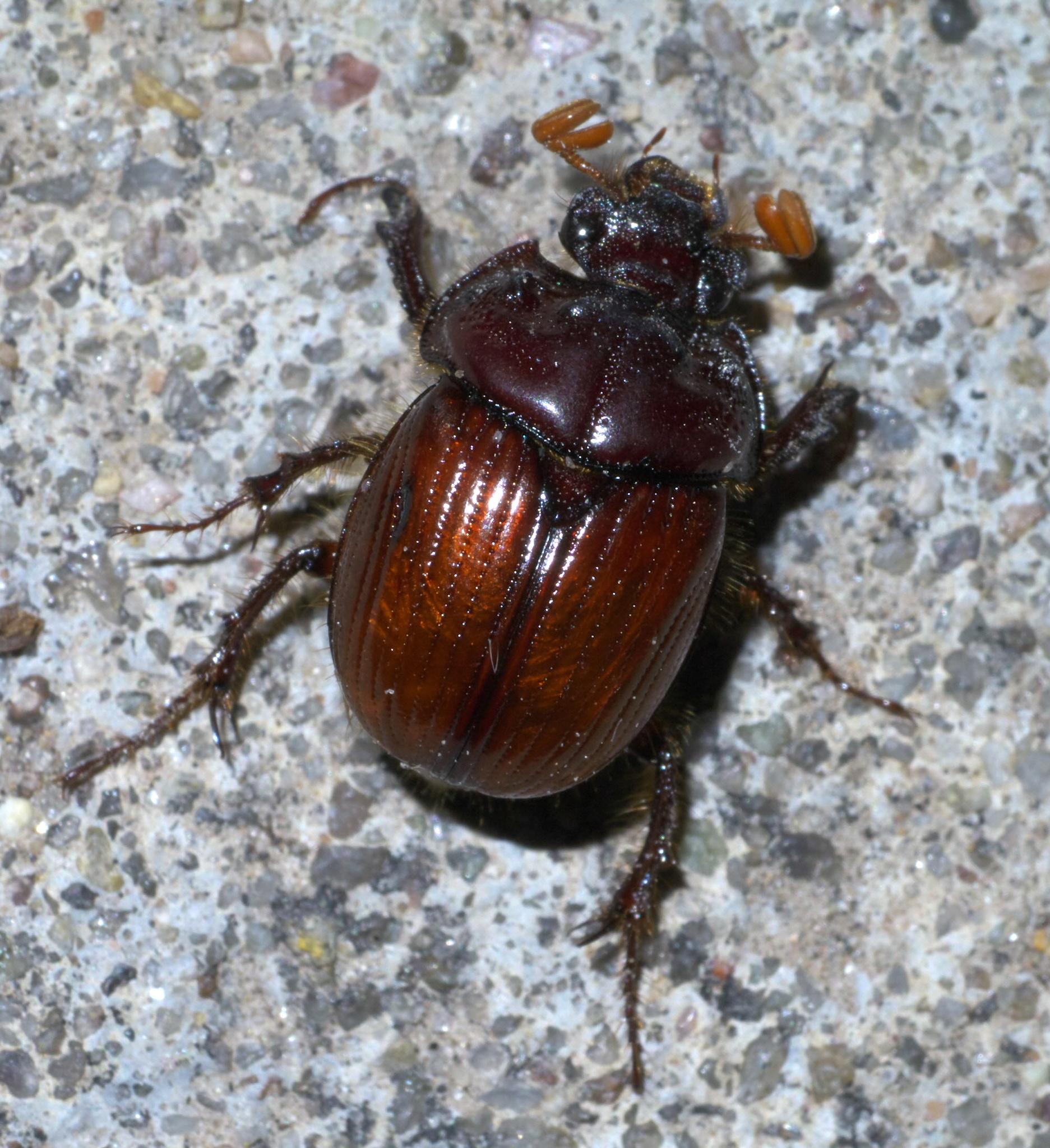
- Eucanthus impressus, Kansas

Scientific classification
- Kingdom: Animalia
- Phylum: Arthropoda
- Clade: Pancrustacea
- Class: Insecta
- Order: Coleoptera
- Suborder: Polyphaga
- Infraorder: Scarabaeiformia
- Family: Bolboceratidae
- Genus: Eucanthus
- Species: E. impressus

Binomial name
- Eucanthus impressus Howden, 1964

= Eucanthus impressus =

Species of beetle

Eucanthus impressus is a species of earth-boring scarab beetle in the family Geotrupidae. It is found in North America.
