= Eucanthus subtropicus =

Scientific classification
- Domain: Eukaryota
- Kingdom: Animalia
- Phylum: Arthropoda
- Class: Insecta
- Order: Coleoptera
- Suborder: Polyphaga
- Infraorder: Scarabaeiformia
- Family: Bolboceratidae
- Genus: Eucanthus
- Species: E. subtropicus

Binomial name
- Eucanthus subtropicus HOWDEN, 1955

Species of beetle

Eucanthus subtropicus is a species of earth-boring scarab beetle in the family Geotrupidae. It is found in North America.
