= Bolbocerosoma elongatum =

Scientific classification
- Kingdom: Animalia
- Phylum: Arthropoda
- Clade: Pancrustacea
- Class: Insecta
- Order: Coleoptera
- Suborder: Polyphaga
- Infraorder: Scarabaeiformia
- Family: Bolboceratidae
- Genus: Bolbocerosoma
- Species: B. elongatum

Binomial name
- Bolbocerosoma elongatum Howden, 1955

Species of beetle

Bolbocerosoma elongatum is a species of earth-boring scarab beetle in the family Geotrupidae. It is found in North America.
