= Bolbocerosoma farctum =

Scientific classification
- Kingdom: Animalia
- Phylum: Arthropoda
- Class: Insecta
- Order: Coleoptera
- Suborder: Polyphaga
- Infraorder: Scarabaeiformia
- Family: Bolboceratidae
- Genus: Bolbocerosoma
- Species: B. farctum

Binomial name
- Bolbocerosoma farctum (Fabricius, 1775)

Synonyms
- Scarabaeus cephus Fabricius, 1775

Species of beetle

Bolbocerosoma farctum, the fancy dung beetle, is a species of earth-boring scarab beetle in the family Geotrupidae. It is found in North America.
