= Odonteus floridensis =

Scientific classification
- Domain: Eukaryota
- Kingdom: Animalia
- Phylum: Arthropoda
- Class: Insecta
- Order: Coleoptera
- Suborder: Polyphaga
- Infraorder: Scarabaeiformia
- Family: Bolboceratidae
- Genus: Odonteus
- Species: O. floridensis

Binomial name
- Odonteus floridensis Wallis, 1928

Species of beetle

Odonteus floridensis is a species of earth-boring scarab beetle in the family Geotrupidae. It is found in North America.
