= Bolbaffroides carenicollis =

Scientific classification
- Kingdom: Animalia
- Phylum: Arthropoda
- Class: Insecta
- Order: Coleoptera
- Suborder: Polyphaga
- Infraorder: Scarabaeiformia
- Family: Bolboceratidae
- Genus: Bolbaffroides
- Species: B. carenicollis

Binomial name
- Bolbaffroides carenicollis (Castelnau, 1840)

Synonyms
- Bolboceras carenicollis Laporte, 1840; Bolboceras capitatum Westwood, 1848

Species of beetle

Bolbaffroides carenicollis, is a species of dor beetle found in India, Pakistan and Sri Lanka.

== Description ==
This large species has an average length of about 19 to 23 mm.
