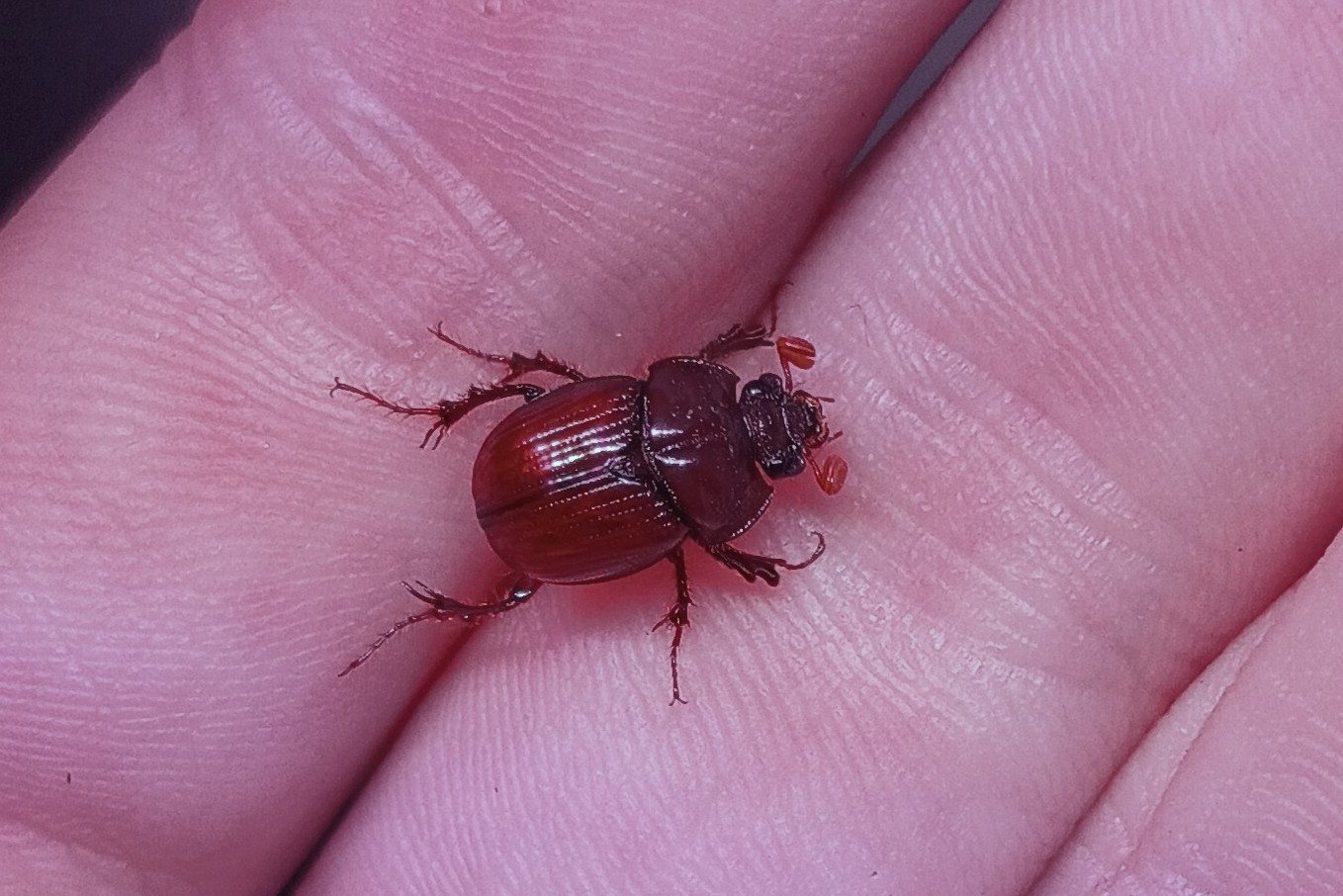

Scientific classification
- Kingdom: Animalia
- Phylum: Arthropoda
- Clade: Pancrustacea
- Class: Insecta
- Order: Coleoptera
- Suborder: Polyphaga
- Infraorder: Scarabaeiformia
- Family: Bolboceratidae
- Genus: Eucanthus
- Species: E. lazarus

Binomial name
- Eucanthus lazarus (Fabricius, 1775)

Synonyms
- Scarabaeus meliboeus Fabricius, 1792

= Eucanthus lazarus =

Species of beetle

Eucanthus lazarus is a species of earth-boring scarab beetle in the family Geotrupidae. It is found in North America.
