= Bolbocerastes imperialis =

Scientific classification
- Domain: Eukaryota
- Kingdom: Animalia
- Phylum: Arthropoda
- Class: Insecta
- Order: Coleoptera
- Suborder: Polyphaga
- Infraorder: Scarabaeiformia
- Family: Bolboceratidae
- Genus: Bolbocerastes
- Species: B. imperialis

Binomial name
- Bolbocerastes imperialis Cartwright, 1953

Species of beetle

Bolbocerastes imperialis is a species of earth-boring scarab beetle in the family Geotrupidae. It is found in North America.

== Subspecies ==
These two subspecies belong to the species Bolbocerastes imperialis:

- Bolbocerastes imperialis imperialis Cartwright, 1953
- Bolbocerastes imperialis kansanus CARTWRIGHT, 1953
