= Bolbocerosoma hamatum =

Scientific classification
- Domain: Eukaryota
- Kingdom: Animalia
- Phylum: Arthropoda
- Class: Insecta
- Order: Coleoptera
- Suborder: Polyphaga
- Infraorder: Scarabaeiformia
- Family: Bolboceratidae
- Genus: Bolbocerosoma
- Species: B. hamatum

Binomial name
- Bolbocerosoma hamatum Brown, 1929

Species of beetle

Bolbocerosoma hamatum is a species of earth-boring scarab beetle in the family Geotrupidae. It is found in North America.
