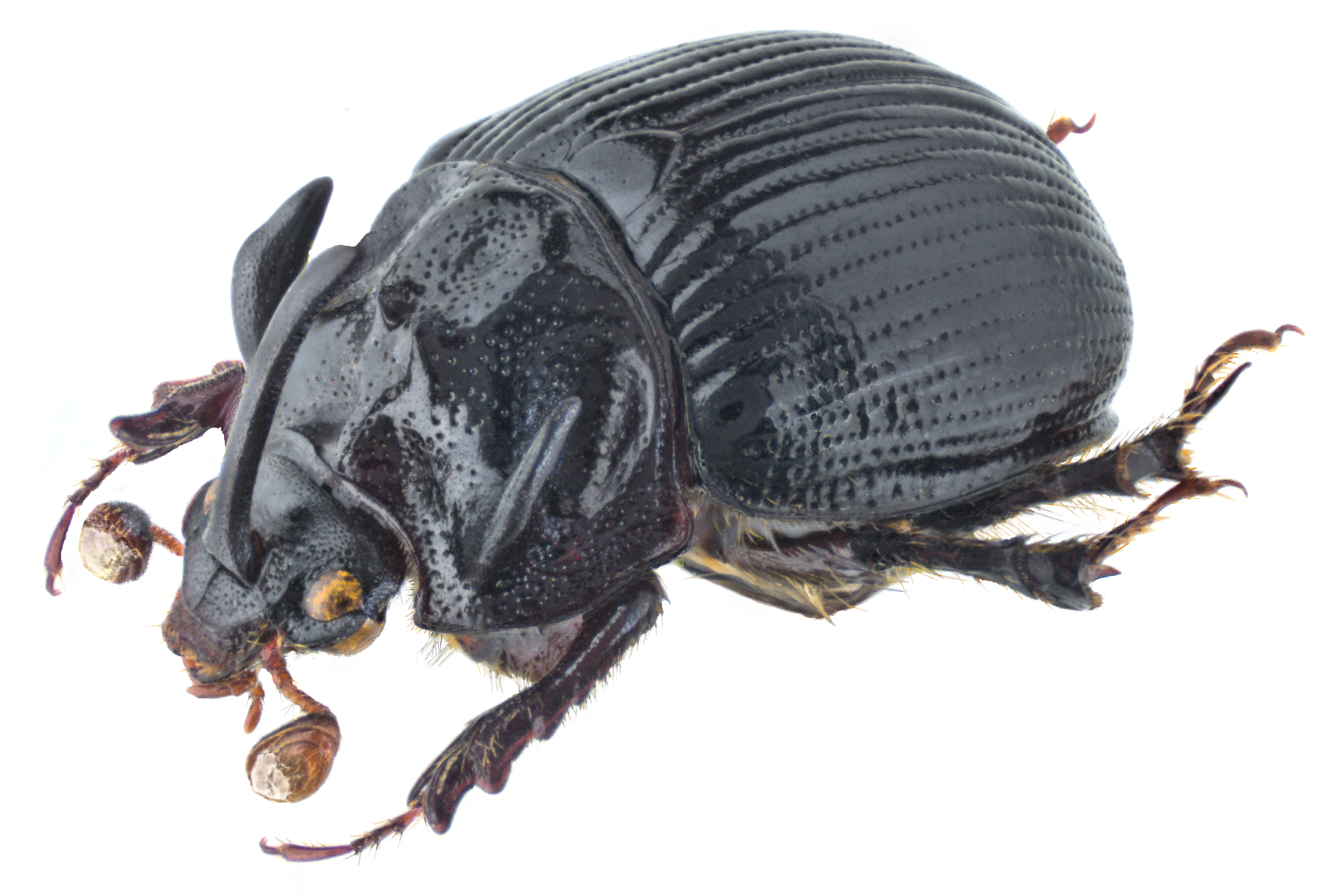
- Male specimen

Scientific classification
- Domain: Eukaryota
- Kingdom: Animalia
- Phylum: Arthropoda
- Class: Insecta
- Order: Coleoptera
- Suborder: Polyphaga
- Infraorder: Scarabaeiformia
- Family: Bolboceratidae
- Genus: Odonteus
- Species: O. armiger

Binomial name
- Odonteus armiger Scopoli, 1772

Synonyms
- Odontaeus armiger (Scopoli 1772); Bolboceras armiger (Scopoli 1772); Scarabaeus bicolor (Fabricius 1775); Scarabaeus mobilicornis (Fabricius 1775); Scarabaeus testaceus (Fabricius 1775); Scarabaeus rufescens (Ponza 1805); Odontaeus fulvus (Mulsant & Rey 1871)

= Odonteus armiger =

Species of beetle

Odonteus armiger is the only European species of the genus Odonteus. It belongs to the superfamily Scarabaeoidea. This species lives a very hidden life and is therefore little known about it, despite its wide distribution.

== Description ==
Its body length is of 7–10 mm (0.28–0.39 in). The deep black, shiny body is short, rounded, and strongly arched. Males have a narrow, movable horn at the base of the head. There are also two smaller horns on the sides of the male's neck shield. The females have a transverse ridge with two small bumps at this point. Other native beetles with a head horn are, for example, the european rhinoceros beetle or Copris lunaris. The antennae consist of movable leaves. Other similar genera are Geotrupes and Typhaeus, which lack the horn, the rimmed seam edge of the elytra and the tomentum spot on the front of the forelegs. Odonteus armiger are also usually smaller than them.

== Distribution and habitat ==
The species has a wide distribution in Europe. In the north, the species is found as far south as Sweden and the south of Great Britain. In the west, the species can be found as far as France and the north-eastern parts of Spain. In the south, the species is found as far north-east as Spain, southern France, northern Italy and the Balkan Peninsula and in the east, the species is found as far south as Russia (east to the Urals) and the Caucasus.

== Taxonomy ==
The species was first described in 1772 by Giovanni Antonio Scopoli under the name Scarabaeus armiger. Over time, the species was initially categorised in the Scarabaeidae family and later assigned to the Geotrupidae. It is now systematically classified as a member of the Bolboceratidae, a small family of the Scarabaeoidea. Numerous synonyms of the species can be found in the literature, for example Odontaeus armiger (Scopoli 1772), Bolboceras armiger (Scopoli 1772), Scarabaeus bicolor (Fabricius 1775), Scarabaeus mobilicornis (Fabricius 1775), Scarabaeus testaceus (Fabricius 1775), Scarabaeus rufescens (Ponza 1805) and Odontaeus fulvus (Mulsant & Rey 1871).

== Literature ==
- Michael Chinery: Pareys Buch der Insekten. Franckh-Kosmos Verlags-GmbH & Co., Stuttgart 2004, ISBN 3-440-09969-5, S. 262.
- Dr. Helgard Reichholf-Riehm, Ruth Kühbandner: Insekten mit Anhang Spinnentiere (Steinbachs Naturführer) Neue, bearbeitete Sonderausgabe. Mosaik Verlag, München 1984, ISBN 978-3-576-10562-1, S. 144.
