= Bolbelasmus minor =

Scientific classification
- Kingdom: Animalia
- Phylum: Arthropoda
- Class: Insecta
- Order: Coleoptera
- Suborder: Polyphaga
- Infraorder: Scarabaeiformia
- Family: Bolboceratidae
- Genus: Bolbelasmus
- Species: B. minor

Binomial name
- Bolbelasmus minor (Linell, 1896)

Species of beetle

Bolbelasmus minor is a species of beetle in the family Geotrupidae. It is found in North America.
