= Bolbocerastes =

Scientific classification
- Domain: Eukaryota
- Kingdom: Animalia
- Phylum: Arthropoda
- Class: Insecta
- Order: Coleoptera
- Suborder: Polyphaga
- Infraorder: Scarabaeiformia
- Family: Bolboceratidae
- Subfamily: Bolboceratinae
- Genus: Bolbocerastes; Cartwright, 1953

Genus of beetles

Bolbocerastes is a genus of earth-boring scarab beetles in the family Bolboceratidae. There are at least four described species in Bolbocerastes.

== Species ==
These four species belong to the genus Bolbocerastes:

- Bolbocerastes imperialis Cartwright, 1953
- Bolbocerastes peninsularis (Schaeffer, 1906)
- Bolbocerastes regalis Cartwright, 1953
- Bolbocerastes serratus (LeConte, 1854)
