= Bradycinetulus =

Scientific classification
- Kingdom: Animalia
- Phylum: Arthropoda
- Class: Insecta
- Order: Coleoptera
- Suborder: Polyphaga
- Infraorder: Scarabaeiformia
- Family: Bolboceratidae
- Subfamily: Bolboceratinae
- Genus: Bradycinetulus; Cockerell, 1906

Genus of beetles

Bradycinetulus is a genus of earth-boring scarab beetles in the family Bolboceratidae. There are at least three described species in Bradycinetulus.

== Species ==
These three species belong to the genus Bradycinetulus:

- Bradycinetulus ferrugineus (Palisot de Beauvois, 1809)
- Bradycinetulus fossatus (Haldeman, 1853)
- Bradycinetulus rex Cartwright, 1953
