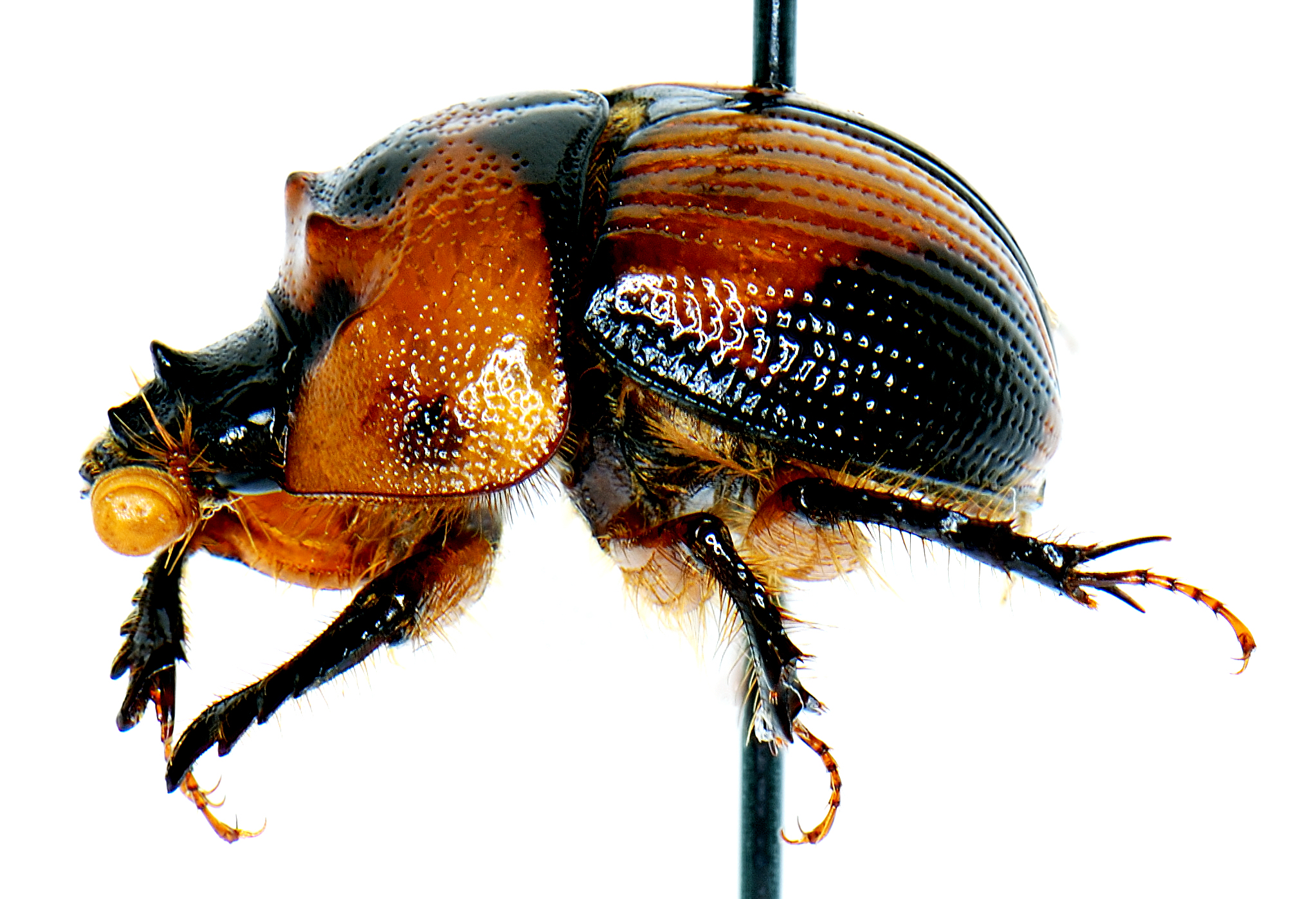
- Bolbocerosoma tumefactum

Scientific classification
- Kingdom: Animalia
- Phylum: Arthropoda
- Class: Insecta
- Order: Coleoptera
- Suborder: Polyphaga
- Infraorder: Scarabaeiformia
- Family: Bolboceratidae
- Subfamily: Bolboceratinae
- Genus: Bolbocerosoma; Schaeffer, 1906

= Bolbocerosoma =

Genus of beetles

Bolbocerosoma (sometimes misspelled as Bolbocerasoma) is a genus of earth-boring scarab beetles in the family Bolboceratidae. There are about 13 described species in Bolbocerosoma.

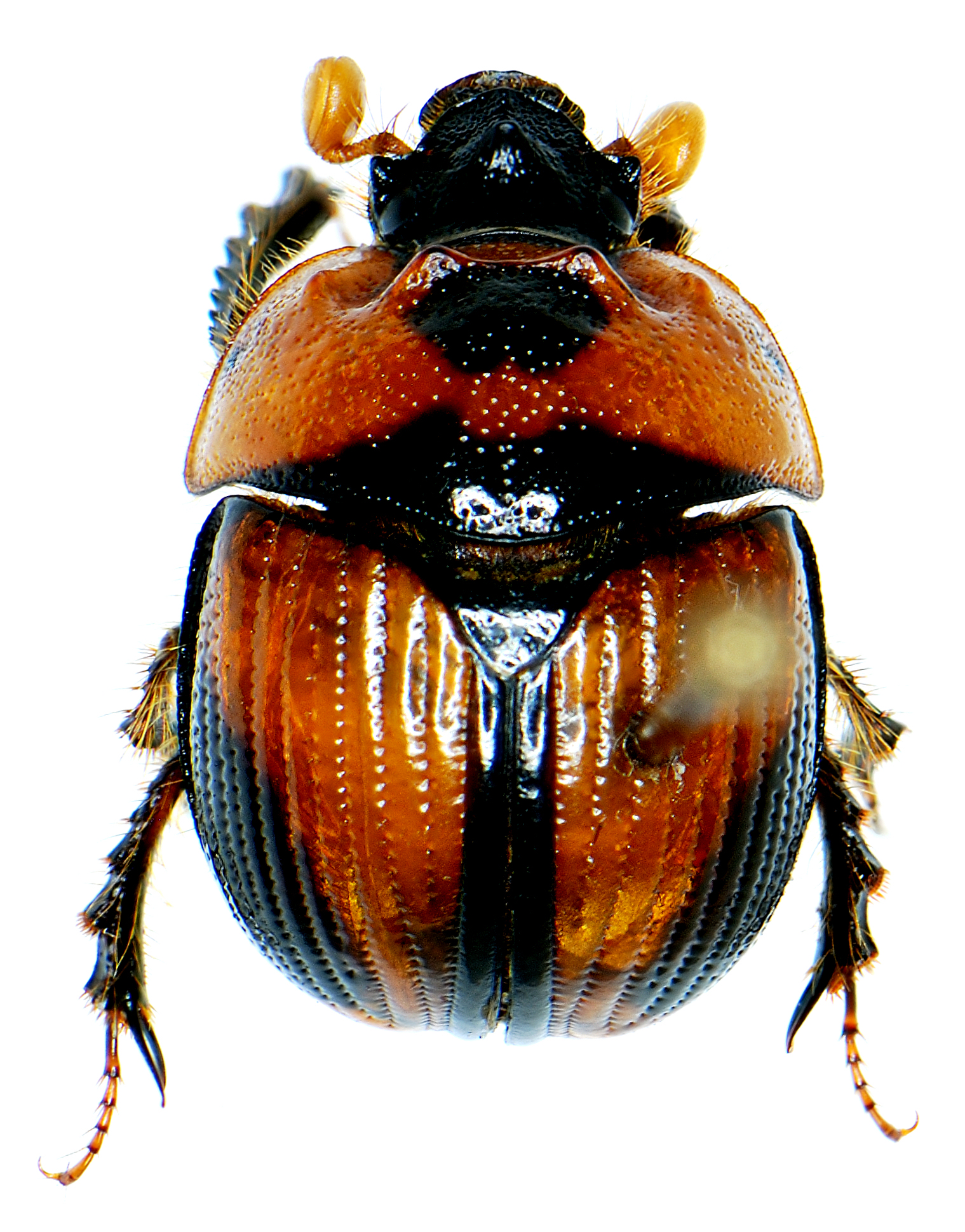
Bolbocerosoma tumefactum

== Species ==
- Bolbocerosoma biplagiatum Dawson and McColloch, 1924
- Bolbocerosoma bruneri Dawson & Mccolloch, 1924
- Bolbocerosoma cartwrighti Howden, 1955
- Bolbocerosoma confusum Brown, 1928
- Bolbocerosoma elongatum Howden, 1955
- Bolbocerosoma farctum (Fabricius, 1775) (fancy dung beetle)
- Bolbocerosoma hamatum Brown, 1929
- Bolbocerosoma lepidissimum Brown, 1928
- Bolbocerosoma mexicanum Howden, 2005
- Bolbocerosoma pusillum Dawson & Mccolloch, 1924
- Bolbocerosoma quadricornum Robinson, 1941
- Bolbocerosoma ritcheri Howden, 1955
- Bolbocerosoma tumefactum (Palisot de Beauvois, 1809)
