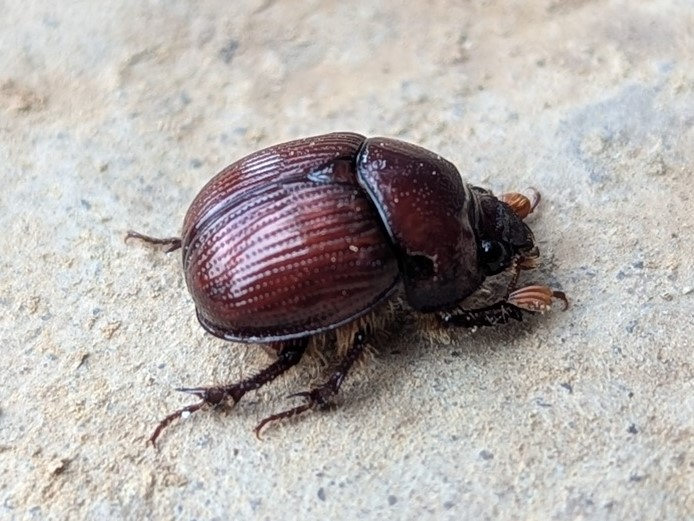
- Bolbelasmus variabilis

Scientific classification
- Kingdom: Animalia
- Phylum: Arthropoda
- Clade: Pancrustacea
- Class: Insecta
- Order: Coleoptera
- Suborder: Polyphaga
- Infraorder: Scarabaeiformia
- Superfamily: Scarabaeoidea
- Family: Bolboceratidae
- Subfamily: Bolboceratinae
- Tribe: Bolboceratini
- Genus: Bolbelasmus; Boucomont, 1911

Synonyms
- Kolbeus Boucomont, 1911

= Bolbelasmus =

Genus of beetles

Bolbelasmus is a genus of beetles in the family Bolboceratidae. There are at least 20 described species in the genus Bolbelasmus.

== Species ==
These 29 species belong to the genus Bolbelasmus.

- Bolbelasmus arcuatus (Bates, 1887)
- Bolbelasmus bajaensis (Howden, 1964)
- Bolbelasmus bocchus (Erichson, 1841)
- Bolbelasmus brancoi Hillert & Kral, 2016
- Bolbelasmus carinifrons Howden & Solis, 1995
- Bolbelasmus casanovaorum López-Colón & Bahillo de la Puebla, 2016
- Bolbelasmus coreanus (Kolbe, 1886)
- Bolbelasmus gallicus (Mulsant, 1842)
- Bolbelasmus horni (Rivers, 1886)
- Bolbelasmus hornii (Rivers, 1886)
- Bolbelasmus howdeni Hillert & Kral, 2016
- Bolbelasmus keithi Miessen & Trichas, 2011
- Bolbelasmus korshunovi Zinchenko, 2016
- Bolbelasmus krikkeni Nikolajev, 1979
- Bolbelasmus makrisi Miessen, 2011
- Bolbelasmus meridionalis Krikken, 1977
- Bolbelasmus minor (Linell, 1896)
- Bolbelasmus minutus Li & Masumoto, 2008
- Bolbelasmus monticolus Howden, 1974
- Bolbelasmus nativus Krikken, 1977
- Bolbelasmus nikolajevi Hillert, Arnone, Kral & Massa, 2016
- Bolbelasmus nireus (Reitter, 1895)
- Bolbelasmus orientalis Petrovitz, 1968
- Bolbelasmus rotundipennis Howden, 1964
- Bolbelasmus shibatai Masumoto, 1984
- Bolbelasmus tauricus Petrovitz, 1973
- Bolbelasmus unicornis (Schrank, 1789)
- Bolbelasmus variabilis Howden, 1964
- Bolbelasmus vaulogeri (Abeille De Perrin, 1898)
