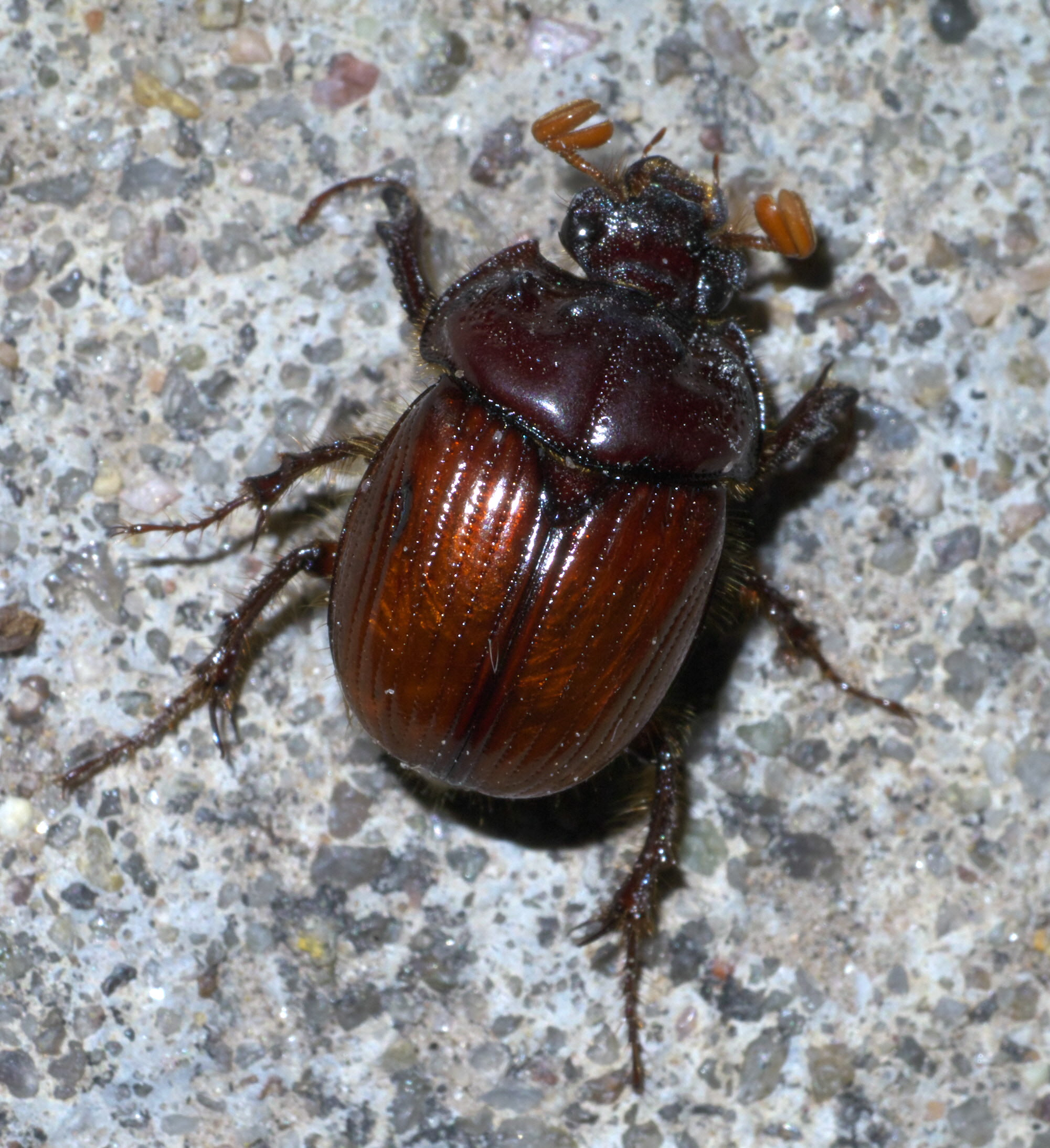

Scientific classification
- Kingdom: Animalia
- Phylum: Arthropoda
- Class: Insecta
- Order: Coleoptera
- Suborder: Polyphaga
- Infraorder: Scarabaeiformia
- Family: Bolboceratidae
- Tribe: Bolboceratini
- Genus: Eucanthus; Westwood, 1848

= Eucanthus =

Genus of beetles

Eucanthus is a genus of earth-boring scarab beetles in the family Bolboceratidae. There are about eight described species in Eucanthus.

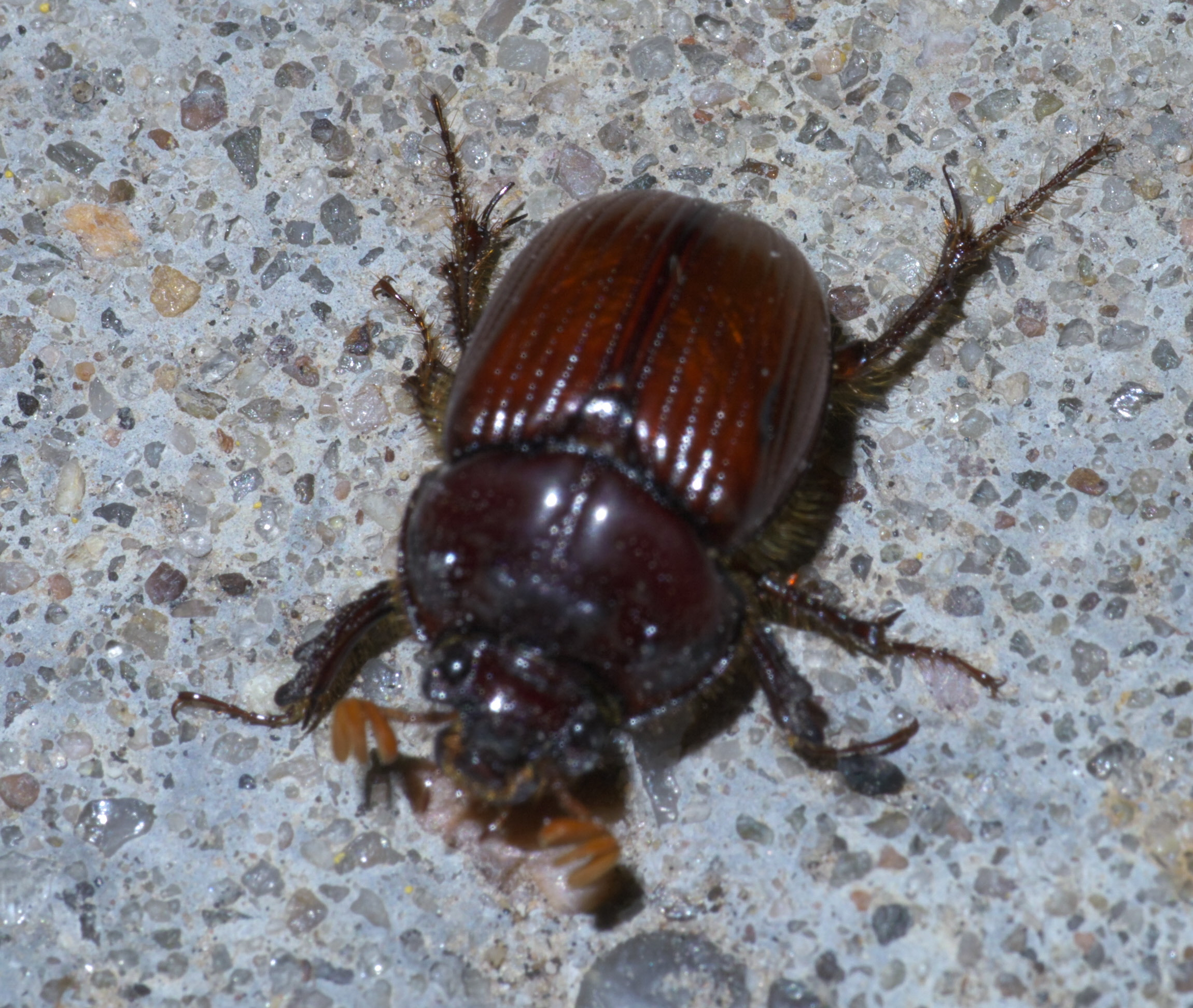

== Species ==
These eight species belong to the genus Eucanthus:

- Eucanthus alutaceus Cartwright, 1944
- Eucanthus bonariensis (Klug, 1843)
- Eucanthus felschei Boucomont, 1910
- Eucanthus greeni Robinson, 1948
- Eucanthus impressus Howden, 1964
- Eucanthus lazarus (Fabricius, 1775)
- Eucanthus mexicanus Howden, 1964
- Eucanthus subtropicus HOWDEN, 1955
