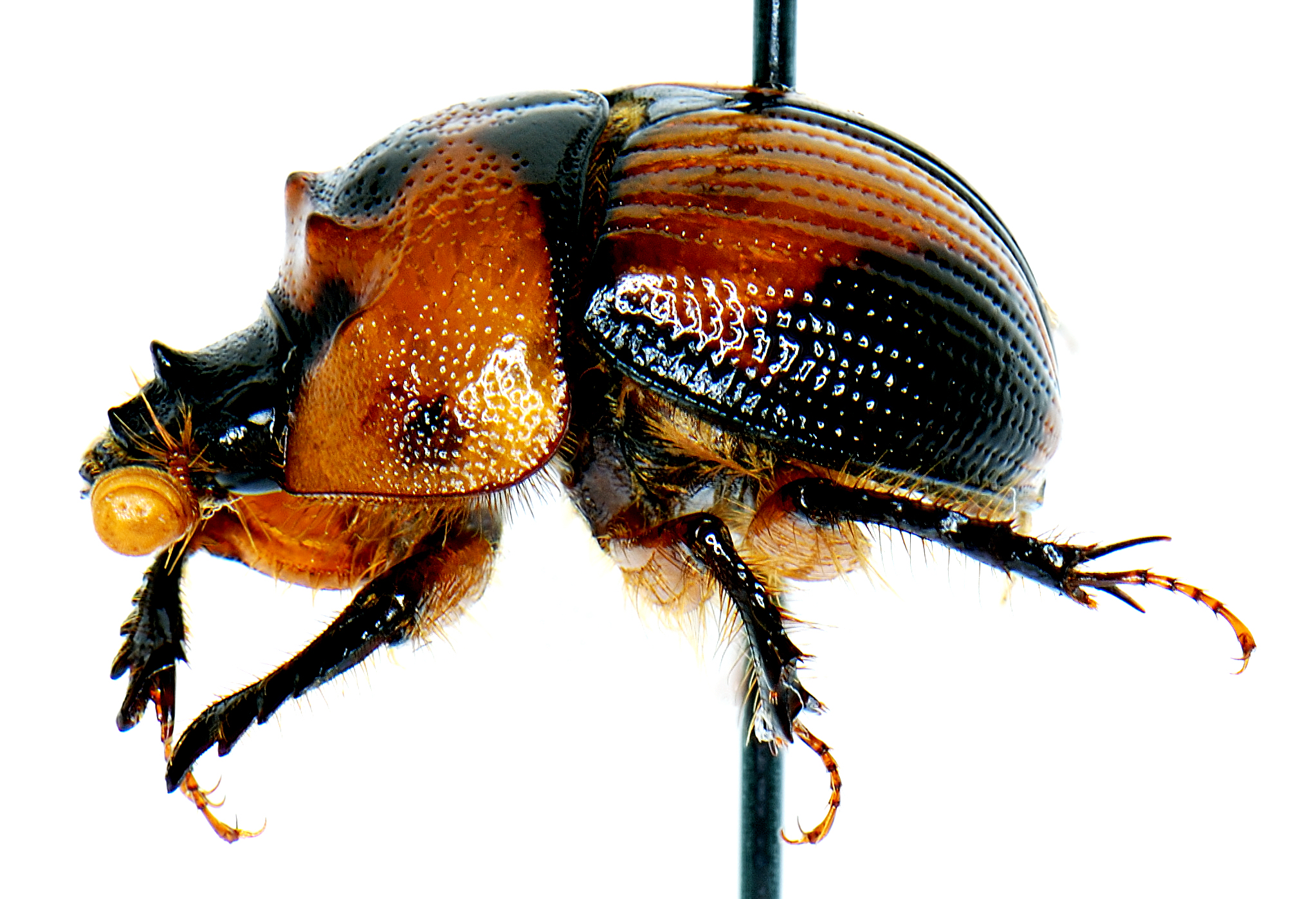
- Bolbocerosoma tumefactum

Scientific classification
- Kingdom: Animalia
- Phylum: Arthropoda
- Clade: Pancrustacea
- Class: Insecta
- Order: Coleoptera
- Suborder: Polyphaga
- Infraorder: Scarabaeiformia
- Family: Bolboceratidae
- Subfamily: Bolboceratinae; Mulsant, 1842

= Bolboceratinae =

Subfamily of beetles

Bolboceratinae is a subfamily of earth-boring scarab beetles in the family Geotrupidae. There are about eight genera and at least 40 described species in Bolboceratinae.

Catalogue of Life and GBIF now consider Bolboceratinae to be a family, Bolboceratidae, rather than a subfamily. ITIS currently treats Bolboceratinae as a subfamily of Geotrupidae.

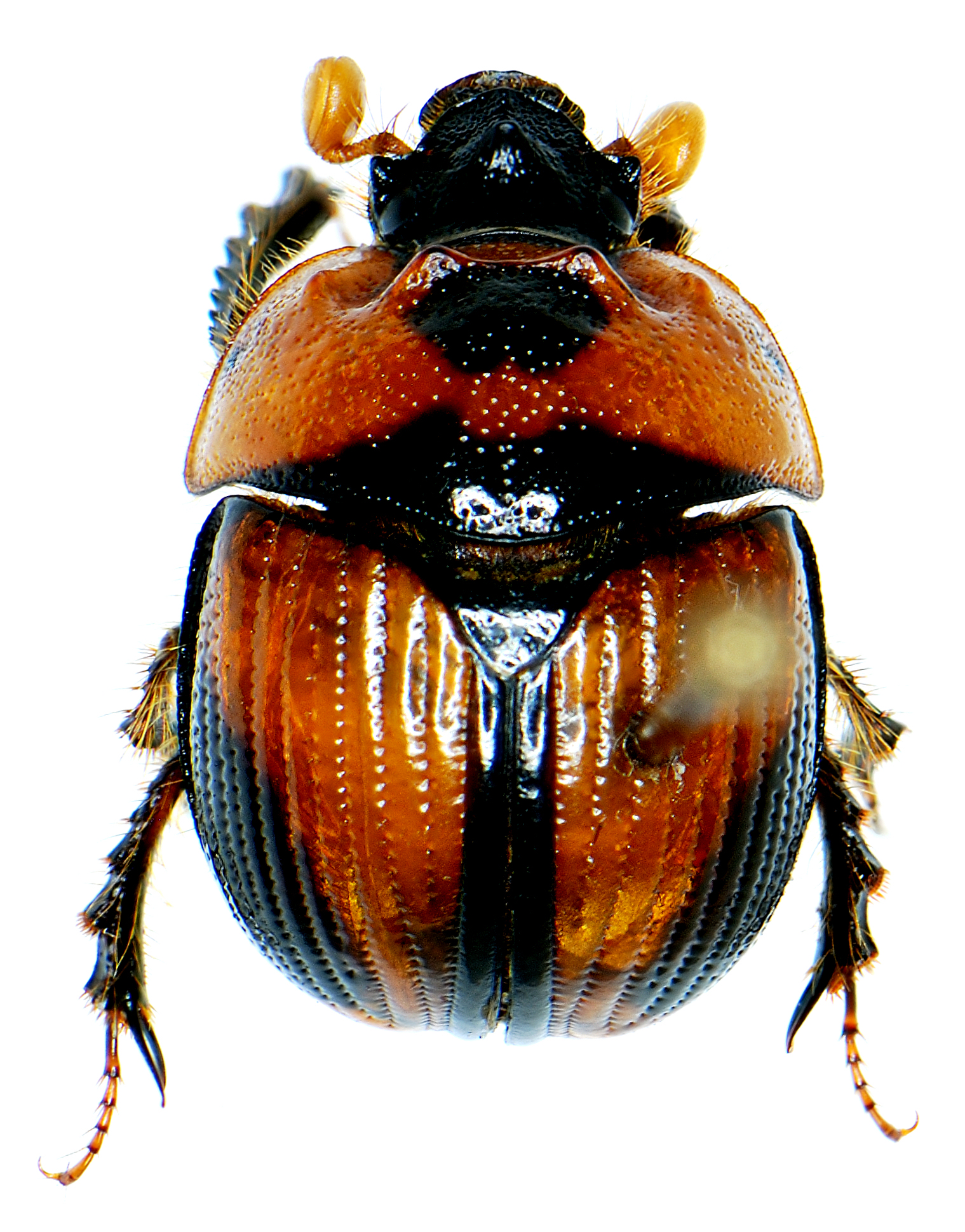
Bolbocerosoma tumefactum

== Genera ==
These eight genera belong to the subfamily Bolboceratinae:

- Bolbelasmus Boucomont, 1911
- Bolbocerastes Cartwright, 1953
- Bolbocerosoma Schaeffer, 1906
- Bolborhombus Cartwright, 1953
- Bradycinetulus Cockerell, 1906
- Eucanthus Westwood, 1848
- Neoathyreus Howden and Martínez, 1963
- Odonteus Samouelle, 1819
