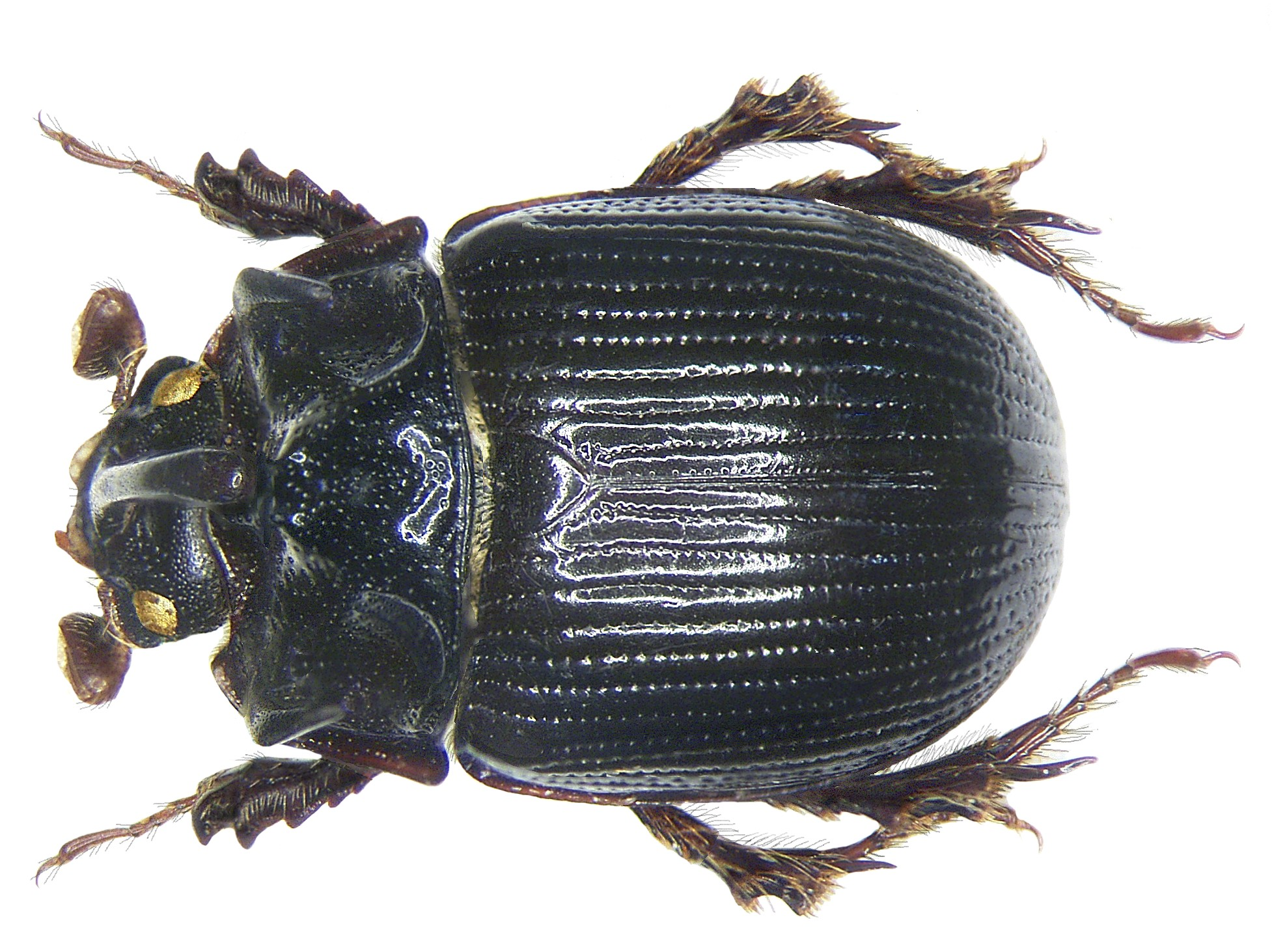
- Odonteus armiger

Scientific classification
- Domain: Eukaryota
- Kingdom: Animalia
- Phylum: Arthropoda
- Class: Insecta
- Order: Coleoptera
- Suborder: Polyphaga
- Infraorder: Scarabaeiformia
- Family: Bolboceratidae
- Tribe: Bolboceratini
- Genus: Odonteus; Samouelle, 1819

Synonyms
- Bolboceras Kirby, 1819; Odontaeus Dejean, 1821; Indobolbus Nikolajev, 1979

= Odonteus =

Genus of beetles

Odonteus is a genus of beetles in the family Bolboceratidae, formerly known by the name Bolboceras. The name Bolboceras was replaced in 1990 when it was discovered that Odonteus had been published one month earlier; this finding was upheld by ICZN Opinion 2138 in 2006, which made the two names synonymous, with Odonteus having priority. Some researchers continue to use the invalid junior name (e.g.).

== Species ==
- Odonteus alabamensis (Wallis, 1928)
- Odonteus armiger (Scopoli, 1772) type species
- Odonteus baeri (Boucomont, 1902)
- Odonteus berytensis (Petrovitz, 1963)
- Odonteus bicarinatus (Westwood, 1852)
- Odonteus bigibbosus (Luederwaldt, 1929)
- Odonteus birmanicus (Lansberge, 1885)
- Odonteus borgmeieri (Martinez, 1976)
- Odonteus caesus (Klug, 1843)
- Odonteus capitatus (Westwood, 1848)
- Odonteus consanguineus (Lansberge, 1885)
- Odonteus corniculatus (Westwood, 1852)
- Odonteus cornigerus (Melsheimer, 1846)
- Odonteus darlingtoni (Wallis, 1928)
- Odonteus davatchii (Baraud, 1973)
- Odonteus dorsalis (Westwood, 1848)
- Odonteus dorsualis (Boheman, 1857)
- Odonteus duplicatus (Krikken, 2013)
- Odonteus falli (Wallis, 1928)
- Odonteus filicornis (Say, 1823)
- Odonteus floridensis (Wallis, 1928)
- Odonteus gagarinei (Fairmaire, 1892)
- Odonteus gaujani (Fairmaire, 1892)
- Odonteus globosus (Castelnau, 1840)
- Odonteus howdeni (Martinez, 1976)
- Odonteus inaequalis (Westwood, 1848)
- Odonteus inchoatus (Péringuey, 1901)
- Odonteus kenyensis (Krikken, 2011)
- Odonteus laportei (Haldeman, 1853)
- Odonteus liebecki (Wallis, 1928)
- Odonteus lucidulus (Klug, 1843)
- Odonteus lutulentus (Klug, 1843)
- Odonteus minutus (Luederwaldt, 1929)
- Odonteus modestus (Castelnau, 1840)
- Odonteus nigricans (Westwood, 1848)
- Odonteus nigriceps (Westwood, 1852)
- Odonteus niloticus (Boucomont, 1928)
- Odonteus obesus (LeConte, 1859)
- Odonteus orissicus (Krikken, 2013
- Odonteus paralucidulus (Ide & Martinez, 1993)
- Odonteus quadridens (Fabricius, 1781)
- Odonteus quadrispinosus (Luederwaldti, 1929)
- Odonteus quinquestriatus (Boucomont, 1932)
- Odonteus scabricollis (Westwood, 1848)
- Odonteus sculpturatus (Mannerheim, 1829)
- Odonteus simi (Wallis, 1928)
- Odonteus striatopunctatus (Castelnau, 1840)
- Odonteus sulcifrons (Ide & Martinez, 1993)
- Odonteus thoracicornis (Wallis, 1928)
- Odonteus transversalis (Westwood, 1848)
- Odonteus trisulcatus (Klug, 1843)
- Odonteus westwoodi (Haldeman, 1853)
