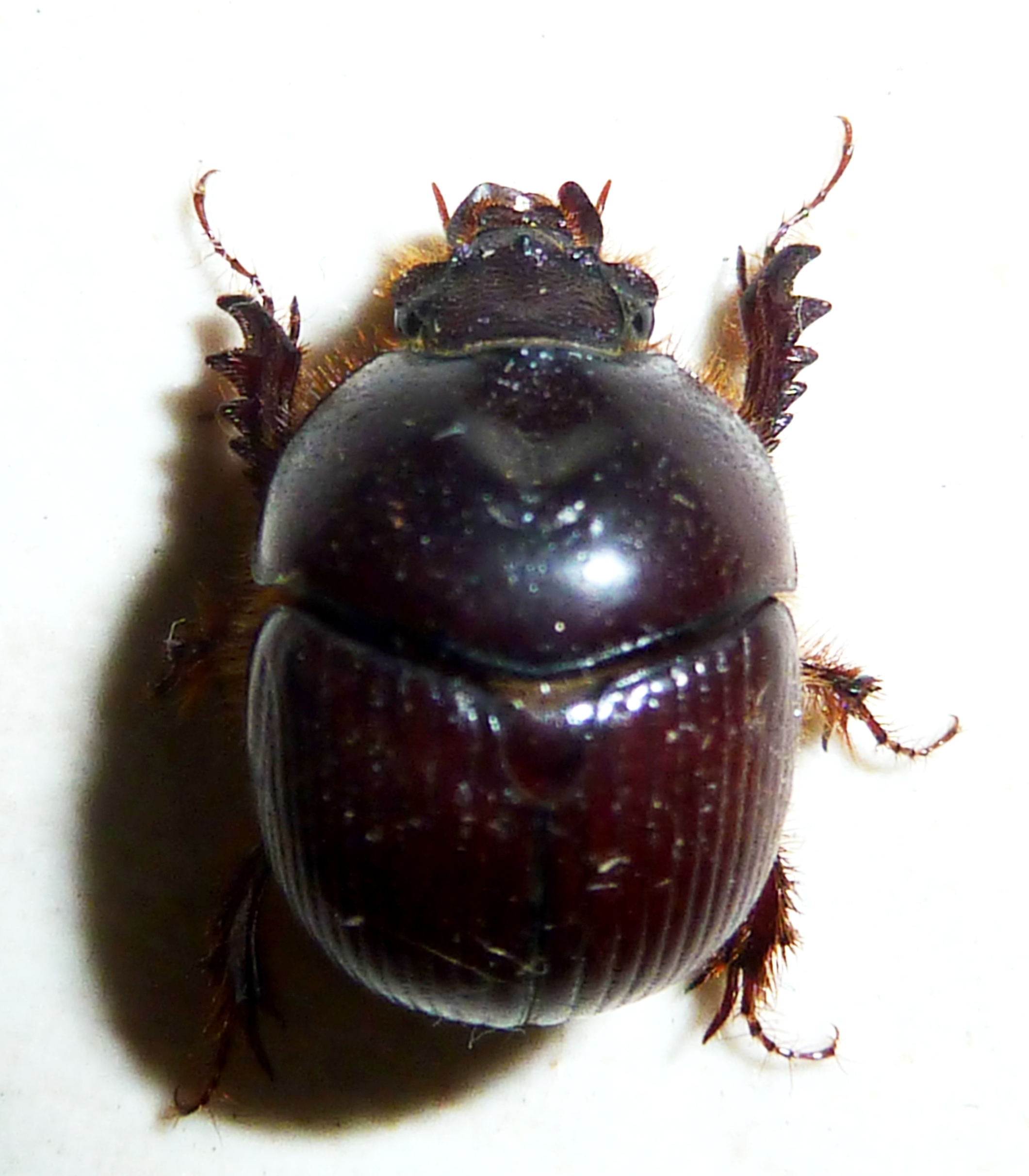
- An unidentified bolboceratid

Scientific classification
- Kingdom: Animalia
- Phylum: Arthropoda
- Clade: Pancrustacea
- Class: Insecta
- Order: Coleoptera
- Suborder: Polyphaga
- Infraorder: Scarabaeiformia
- Superfamily: Scarabaeoidea
- Family: Bolboceratidae; Mulsant, 1842

Synonyms
- Bolboceratinae

= Bolboceratidae =

Bolboceratidae Temporal range: Aptian–Present

Family of beetles

Bolboceratidae is a family of beetle. It was historically treated as a subfamily of the earth-boring dung beetles, or "dor beetles" (family Geotrupidae), but has been considered a separate family by many authors since 1995. Some recent classifications have persisted in treating bolboceratids as a subfamily (e.g.) but these classifications are contradicted by recent phylogenetic studies of relationships indicating that bolboceratids are not closely related to geotrupids (e.g., that bolboceratids are more closely related to Pleocomidae and Passalidae).

== Genera ==
- Athyreus
- Australobolbus
- Blackbolbus
- Blackburnium
- Bolbaffer
- Bolbaffroides
- Bolbelasmus
- Bolbobaineus
- Bolbocaffer
- Bolbocerastes
- Bolboceratex
- Bolboceratops
- Bolbocerodema
- Bolboceroides
- Bolbocerosoma
- Bolbochromus
- Bolbogonium
- Bolbohamatum
- Bolboleaus
- Bolborhachium
- Bolborhinum
- Bolborhombus
- Bolbothyreus
- Bolbotrypes
- Bradycinetulus
- Cretobolbus
- Elephastomus
- Eubolbitus
- Eucanthus
- Gilletinus
- Halffterobolbus
- Meridiobolbus
- Mesoathyreus
- Mimobolbus
- Namibiobolbus
- Namibiotrupes
- Neoathyreus
- Odonteus
- Parabolbapium
- Parathyreus
- Pereirabolbus
- Prototrupes
- Pseudoathyreus
- Socotrabolbus
- Somalobolbus
- Senaspidius
- Zefevazia

=== Fossil genera ===
- †Amberathyreus Bai and Zhang 2017 Burmese amber, Myanmar, Cenomanian
- †Cretobolbus Nikolajev 1996, Zaza Formation, Russia, Aptian
