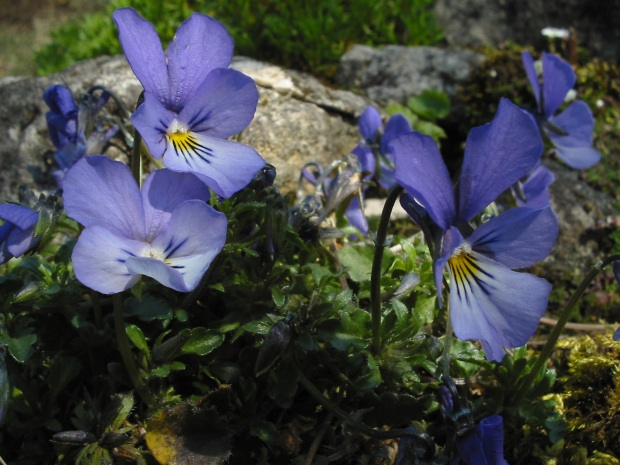

Conservation status
- Critically Endangered (IUCN 3.1)

Scientific classification
- Kingdom: Plantae
- Clade: Tracheophytes
- Clade: Angiosperms
- Clade: Eudicots
- Clade: Rosids
- Order: Malpighiales
- Family: Violaceae
- Genus: Viola
- Species: V. hispida

Binomial name
- Viola hispida Lam.

Synonyms
- Viola cryana Gill.

= Viola hispida =

Species of flowering plant

Viola hispida is a plant species in the genus Viola. It is endemic in France, and more specifically in the Seine valley. It is known as the Violette de Cry ('violet of Cry', pronounced [kʁi], CREE) or Pensée de Cry ('pansy of Cry').

== Description ==
This biennial or perennial herb is not higher than 12 cm and has a glabrous stem. The stipule is cut and has an entire central lobe. Like all violets the flowers are zygomorphic. The petals are light violet. The spur is with six to seven millimetres larger than the calyx. The flowering period is from May to June.

Viola cryana was a population described in 1878 by François-Xavier Gillot as an independent species, from a single locality in the French Department Yonne first reported in 1860. This collection was made on small limestone outcrops in the region of Cry southeast of Tonnerre, and accessions of this form remained in cultivation for some time. It is now no longer extant; the population at this location disappeared by 1930.

== Ecology ==
It is a species restricted in habitat to calcite-rich, rocky areas, and it is restricted in distribution to the valleys of the Seine and Andelle Rivers.

== Conservation ==
It is critically endangered. The number of individuals is declining and there are extreme fluctuations in the population.
