= Gillotia =

Gillotia may refer to:

- Gillotia (fly), a genus of European non-biting midges in the subfamily Chironominae
- Gillotia (fungus), a genus of fungi in the family Mycosphaerellaceae
