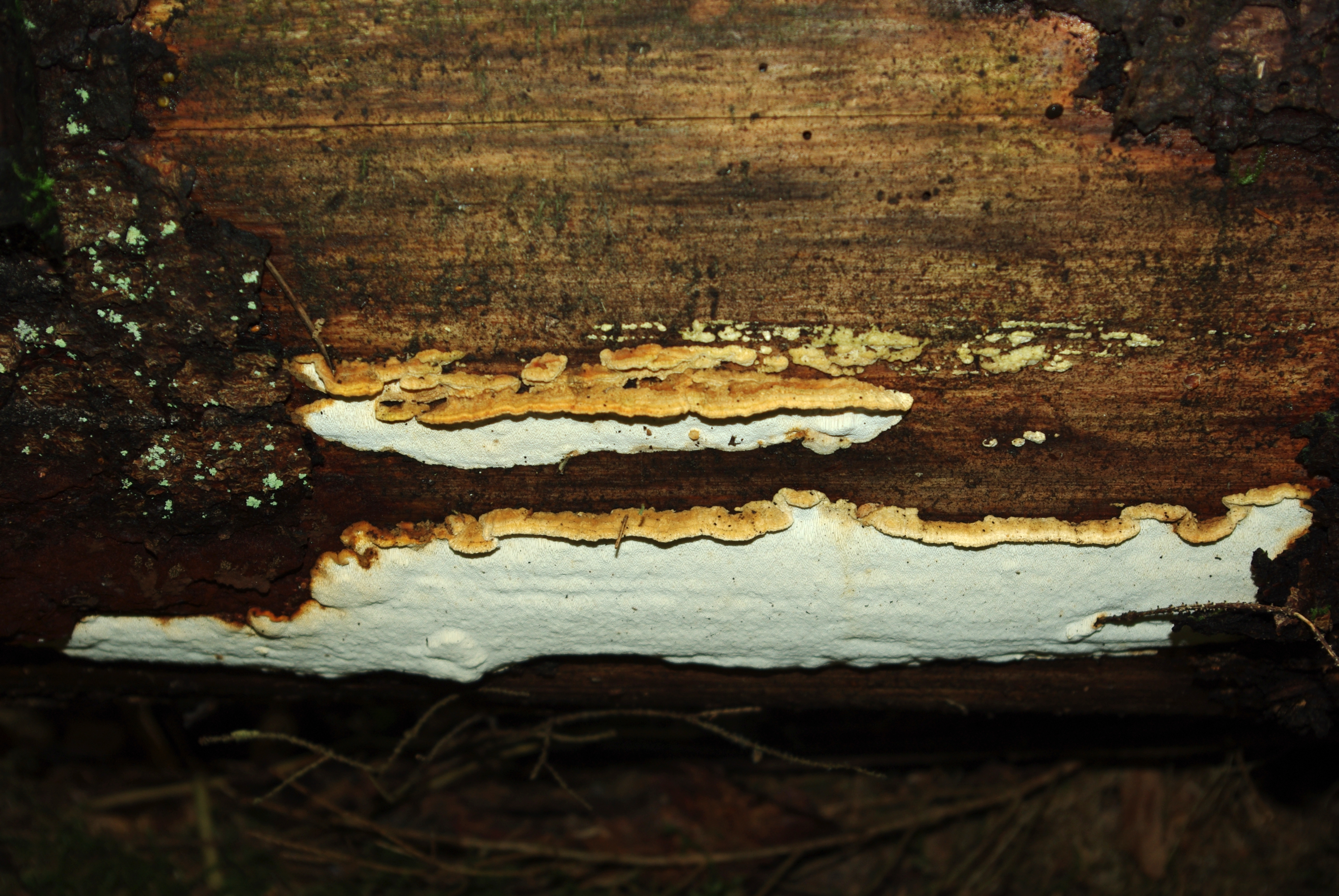
- Antrodia serialis

Scientific classification
- Kingdom: Fungi
- Division: Basidiomycota
- Class: Agaricomycetes
- Order: Polyporales
- Family: Fomitopsidaceae
- Genus: Antrodia; P.Karst. (1879)

Type species
- Antrodia serpens (Fr.) P.Karst. (1879)

Species
- ~50

Synonyms
- Coriolellus Murrill (1905); Cartilosoma Kotl. & Pouzar (1958)

= Antrodia =

Genus of fungi

Antrodia is a genus of fungi in the family Fomitopsidaceae. Antrodia species have fruit bodies that typically resupinate (i.e., lying flat or spread out on the growing surface), with the hymenium exposed to the outside; the edges may be turned so as to form narrow brackets. Most species are found in temperate and boreal forests, and cause brown rot.

== Description ==
Antrodia are effused-resupinate, that is, they lie stretched out on the growing surface with the hymenium exposed on the outer side, but turned out at the edges to form brackets. When present, these brackets are typically white or pale brown. The pores on the surface of the hymenium may be round or angular. The context is white or pale. All species cause brown-rot. Typically, basidiospores are thin-walled, cylindrical, and narrowly ellipsoidal or fusiform in shape. Most species grow on the wood of coniferous trees, except for A. albida, which grows on the dead wood of deciduous trees.

== Distribution and ecology ==
Roughly twenty-nine species are known from Europe, 21 species in North America, and 18 species in East Asia, although more new species have been reported since the time of these publications.

A possible Antrodia growing on a pine (Pinus) log was once recorded as food of the little-known pleasing fungus beetle Haematochiton elateroides; however, the species "A."odora, as which the fungus in question was tentatively identified, is nowadays placed in genus Tyromyces (as T.odorus), which among the Polyporales is not even particularly closely related to Antrodia.

== Taxonomy ==
The modern definition of the genus follows the description given by Gilbertson and Ryvarden (1986), in their monograph North American Polypores.

In order to reliably identify the various species and strains of medicinal Antrodia, genetic markers have been developed and phylogenetic analyses performed. These analyses have demonstrated that there are three distinct phylogenetic lineages within the genus Antrodia.

=== Species ===
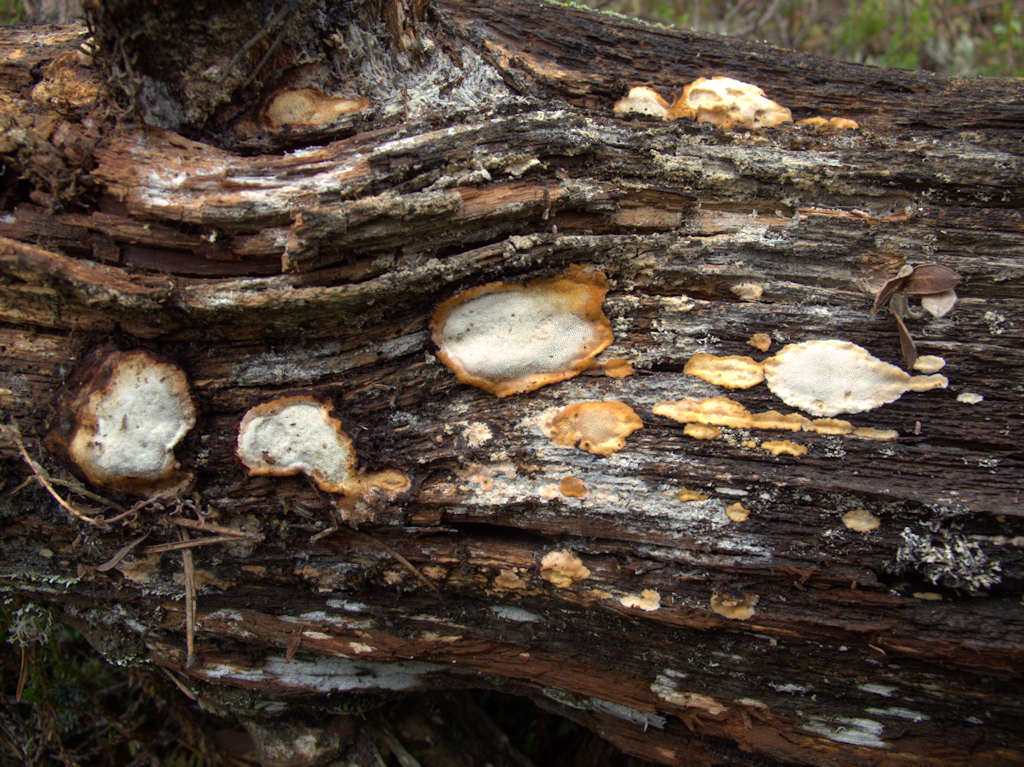
Antrodia albobrunnea

The following species are recognised in the genus Antrodia:

- Antrodia afrosinuosa Ryvarden (2019)
- Antrodia albida (Fr.) Donk (1966)
- Antrodia alpina (Litsch.) Gilb. & Ryvarden (1985)
- Antrodia angulopora (M.J. Larsen & Lombard) Ryvarden (2023)
- Antrodia aurantia Lodge, Ryvarden & Perd.-Sánch. (2001)
- Antrodia bambusicola Y.C. Dai & B.K. Cui (2011) – China
- Antrodia bohemica (Bernicchia, Vampola & Prodi) Ryvarden & Melo (2018)
- Antrodia calceus (Fr.) Teixeira (1992)
- Antrodia conchata D.A. Reid (1974)
- Antrodia eutelea (Har. & Pat.) Ryvarden (1983)
- Antrodia favescens (Schwein.) Vlasák & Spirin (2014)
- Antrodia gossypium (Speg.) Ryvarden (1973)
- Antrodia griseoflavescens (Litsch.) Runnel, Spirin & K.H. Larss. (2019)
- Antrodia heteromorpha (Fr.) Donk (1966)
- Antrodia hingganensis Y.C. Dai & Penttilä (2006)
- Antrodia hippophaes (Bres.) Ryvarden (1988)
- Antrodia huangshanensis Y.C. Dai & B.K. Cui (2011)
- Antrodia labyrinthica (Bernicchia & Ryvarden) Melo & Ryvarden (2017)
- Antrodia lalashana T.T. Chang & W.N. Chou (1998)
- Antrodia latebrosa Spirin, Ryvarden & Miettinen (2019)
- Antrodia macra (Sommerf.) Niemelä (1985)
- Antrodia macrospora Bernicchia & De Dominicis (1990)
- Antrodia madronae Vlasák & Ryvarden (2012) – western USA
- Antrodia mappa (Overh. & J. Lowe) Miettinen & Vlasák (2014)
- Antrodia multiformis Vlasák (2017) – USA
- Antrodia multipapillata (Corner) T. Hatt. (2003)
- Antrodia neotropica Kaipper-Fig., Robledo & Drechsler-Santos (2016)
- Antrodia novae-zelandiae P.K. Buchanan & Ryvarden (2000)
- Antrodia parvula (Bres.) Ryvarden (1988)
- Antrodia peregrina Spirin, Y.C. Dai & Vlasák (2019)
- Antrodia pictilis (Berk.) Teng (1963)
- Antrodia plicata Niemelä (1978)
- Antrodia porothelioides (Berk. & M.A. Curtis ex Cooke) Ryvarden (1988)
- Antrodia pseudosinuosa A. Henrici & Ryvarden (1997)
- Antrodia ramentacea (Berk. & Broome) Donk (1966)
- Antrodia renehenticii (B. Rivoire, Trichies & Vlasák) Melo & Ryvarden (2017)
- Antrodia rhizomorpha (Bagchee) J.R. Sharma (2000)
- Antrodia rupamii Virdi (1992)
- Antrodia sandaliae Bernicchia & Ryvarden (2001)
- Antrodia sinuosa (Fr.) P. Karst. (1881)
- Antrodia subalbidoides A. David & Dequatre (1985)
- Antrodia submalicola A. David & Dequatre (1985)
- Antrodia subramentacea A. David & Dequatre (1985)
- Antrodia subserpens B.K. Cui & Yuan Y. Chen (2015)
- Antrodia tanakae (Murrill) Spirin & Miettinen (2014)
- Antrodia taxa T.T. Chang & W.N. Chou (1999)
- Antrodia tenerifensis Kout & Vlasák (2017) – Tenerife
- Antrodia terryi (Berk. & Broome) P. Karst. (1879)
- Antrodia tropica B.K. Cui (2012) – China
- Antrodia wangii Y.C. Dai & H.S. Yuan (2006)
- Antrodia yunnanensis M.L. Han & Q. An (2020)

Some species formerly placed here have been moved to other genera; "A." odora, for example, is now moved to Tyromyces odorus in the Species Fungorum database.
