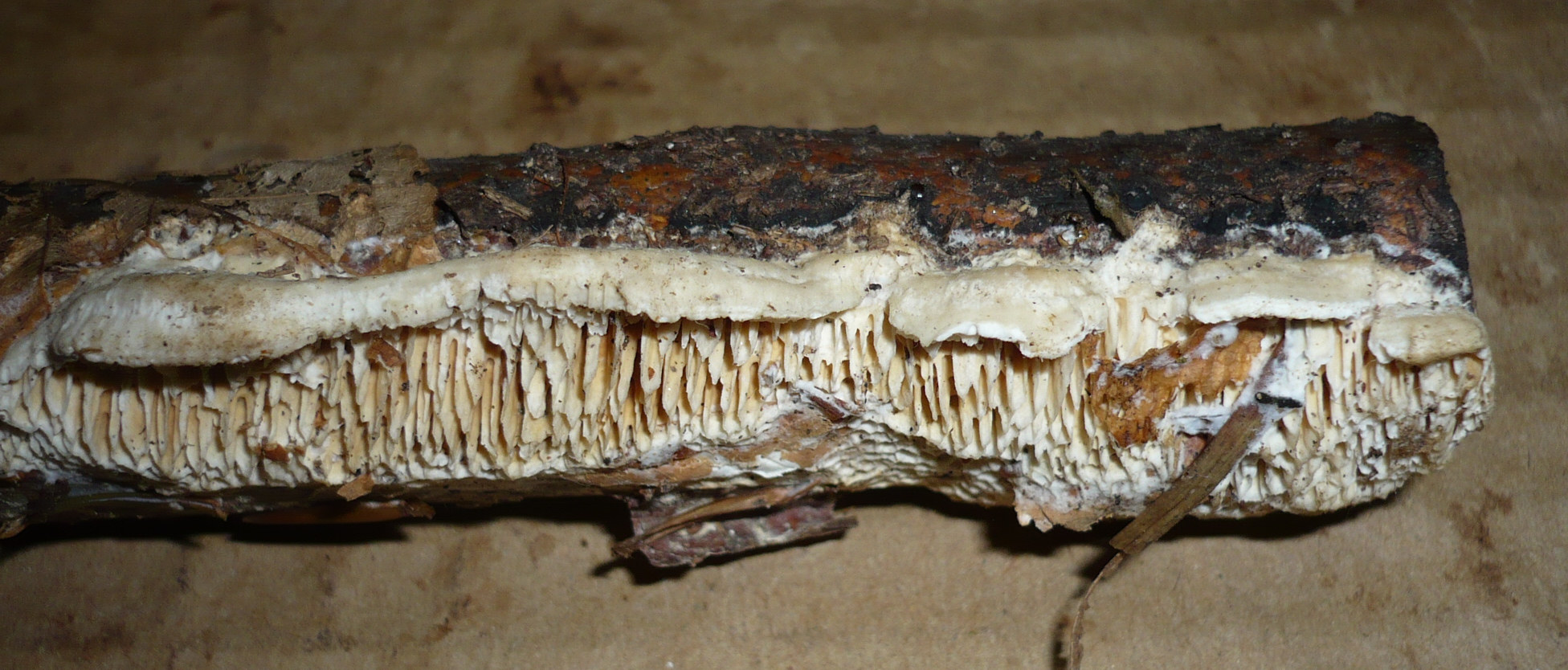
- A plant affected by A. albida

Scientific classification
- Domain: Eukaryota
- Kingdom: Fungi
- Division: Basidiomycota
- Class: Agaricomycetes
- Order: Polyporales
- Family: Fomitopsidaceae
- Genus: Antrodia
- Species: A. albida

Binomial name
- Antrodia albida (Fr.) Donk (1966)

Synonyms
- Daedalea albida Fr. (1815); Polyporus serpens Fr. (1818); Daedalea serpens (Fr.) Fr. (1821); Daedalea albida Schwein. (1822); Lenzites albida (Fr.) Fr. (1838); Trametes albida (Fr.) Fr. (1840); Trametes albida Lév. (1847); Trametes sepium Berk. (1847); Polyporus stephensii Berk. & Broome (1848); Daedalea sepium (Berk.) Ravenel (1855); Cellularia albida (Fr.) Kuntze (1898); Trametes serpens subsp. albida (Fr.) Bourdot & Galzin (1925); Trametes serpens (Fr.) Fr. (1874); Antrodia serpens (Fr.) P.Karst. (1880); Physisporus serpens (Fr.) P.Karst. (1881); Coriolellus sepium (Berk.) Murrill (1905); Trametes subcervina Bres. (1925); Agaricus serpens (Fr.) E.H.L.Krause (1932); Polyporus sepium (Berk.) G.Cunn. (1948); Coriolellus albidus (Fr.) Bondartsev (1953); Coriolellus serpens (Fr.) Bondartsev (1953); Tyromyces sepium (Berk.) G.Cunn. (1965)

= Antrodia albida =

Species of fungus

Antrodia albida is a species of fungus in the genus Antrodia that grows on the dead wood of deciduous trees. A widely distributed species, it is found in Africa, Asia, Europe, Oceania, North America, and South America. The fungus was first described under the name Daedalea albida by Elias Magnus Fries in his 1815 work Observationes mycologicae. Marinus Anton Donk transferred it to Antrodia in 1960.
