= Boletus spongiosus =

Boletus spongiosus may refer to two different species of fungi:

- Boletus spongiosus Lightf. (1777), a taxonomic synonym for the shaggy bracket (Inonotus hispidus)
- Boletus spongiosus Pers. (1801), a taxonomic synonym for the purple dye polypore (Hapalopilus rutilans)
