= Boletus versicolor =

Boletus versicolor may refer to two different species of fungi:

- Boletus versicolor L. (1753), a taxonomic synonym for turkey tail (Trametes versicolor)
- Boletus versicolor sensu Schaeffer, a taxonomic synonym for the purple dye polypore (Hapalopilus rutilans)
