= Hapalopilus albocitrinus =

Scientific classification
- Kingdom: Fungi
- Division: Basidiomycota
- Class: Agaricomycetes
- Order: Polyporales
- Family: Polyporaceae
- Genus: Hapalopilus
- Species: H. albocitrinus

Binomial name
- Hapalopilus albocitrinus (Petch) Ryvarden (1980)

Synonyms
- Poria albocitrina Petch (1922); Poria rhoadsii Murrill (1939)

Species of fungus

Hapalopilus albocitrinus is a species of polypore fungus. Found in South Asia and Africa, it was first described in 1922 by Thomas Petch as a species of Poria. Leif Ryvarden transferred it to the genus Hapalopilus in 1980.
