= Polyporic acid =

Names
- Preferred IUPAC name 2^{3},2^{6}-Dihydroxy[1^{1},2^{1}:2^{4},3^{1}-terphenyl]-2^{2},2^{5}-dione
- Other names Polyporin; Orygameic acid

Identifiers
CAS Number	548-59-4
3D model (JSmol)	Interactive image
ChemSpider	10587
MeSH	C118527
PubChem CID	11056
UNII	VM7U3VEH5G
CompTox Dashboard (EPA)	DTXSID50203281
- InChI: InChI=1S/C18H12O4/c19-15-13(11-7-3-1-4-8-11)16(20)18(22)14(17(15)21)12-9-5-2-6-10-12/h1-10,19,22H Key: HZKFHDXTSAYOSN-UHFFFAOYSA-N; InChI=1/C18H12O4/c19-15-13(11-7-3-1-4-8-11)16(20)18(22)14(17(15)21)12-9-5-2-6-10-12/h1-10,19,22H Key: HZKFHDXTSAYOSN-UHFFFAOYAL
- SMILES: C1=CC=C(C=C1)C2=C(C(=O)C(=C(C2=O)O)C3=CC=CC=C3)O

Properties
Chemical formula	C_{18}H_{12}O_{4}
Molar mass	292.290 g·mol^{−1}

Hazards
- Occupational safety and health (OHS/OSH)
Main hazards	Toxic
- Except where otherwise noted, data are given for materials in their standard state (at 25 °C [77 °F], 100 kPa). Infobox references

Polyporic acid is a para-terphenyl benzoquinone compound first identified by German chemist Stahlschmidt from a mycelial culture of the fungus genus Hapalopilus in 1877. This chemical, present at 20–40% of the fresh weight of the fruit bodies, inhibits the enzyme dihydroorotate dehydrogenase. It is found in other mushrooms, but in much lower amounts.

In animal studies, consumption of polyporic acid caused reduced locomotor activity, depressed visual placing response, hepatorenal failure, metabolic acidosis, hypokalaemia, and hypocalcaemia. Because these effects are similar to those observed in individuals poisoned by H. nidulans, polyporic acid is thought to be the primary toxin in H. nidulans.

Polyporic acid has some antifungal and antibacterial activity. It has been shown to be an intermediate in the biosynthesis of allantofuranone, a gamma-lactone antibiotic from the fungus Allantophomopsis lycopodina.
