= Hapalopilus africanus =

Scientific classification
- Domain: Eukaryota
- Kingdom: Fungi
- Division: Basidiomycota
- Class: Agaricomycetes
- Order: Polyporales
- Family: Polyporaceae
- Genus: Hapalopilus
- Species: H. africanus

Binomial name
- Hapalopilus africanus Ryvarden (1978)

Species of fungus

Hapalopilus africanus is a species of polypore fungus. Found in Rwanda, it was described as new to science in 1978 by Norwegian mycologist Leif Ryvarden. The type collection was found growing on deciduous wood near Nyungwe Forest, close to Cyangugu. The crust-like fruitbodies are yellow with a chrome yellow pore surface. The pores and angular, thin-walled, and number about one to three per millimetre. Spores produced by the fungus are ellipsoid in shape, smooth, hyaline (translucent), measuring 4–5 by 2–2.4 μm.
