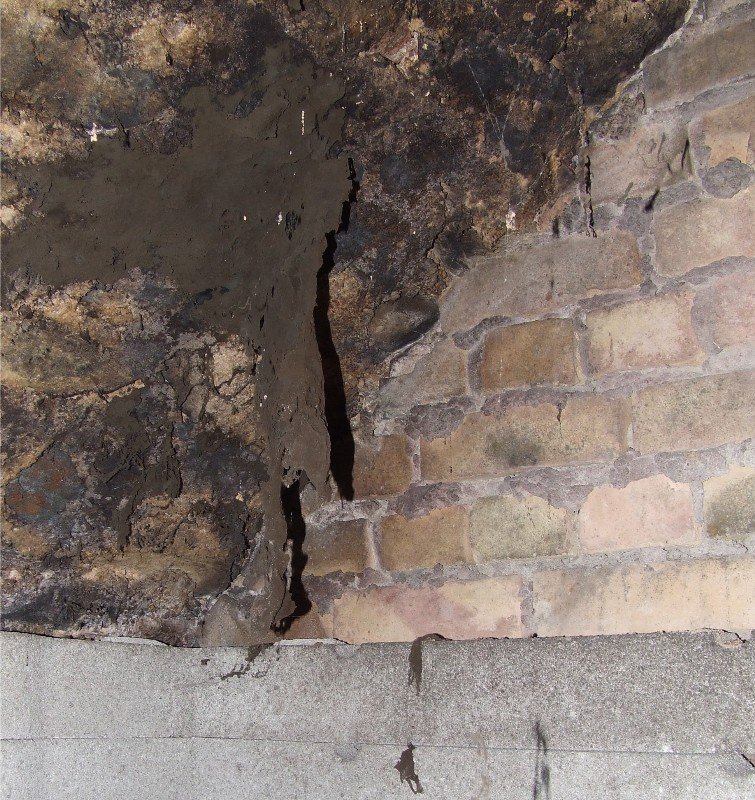
- Gillotia growing up a wall

Scientific classification
- Kingdom: Fungi
- Division: Ascomycota
- Class: Dothideomycetes
- Order: Capnodiales
- Family: Mycosphaerellaceae
- Genus: Gillotia Sacc. & Trotter (1913)

Type species
- Gillotia orbicularis (Syd. & P.Syd.) Sacc. & Trotter (1913)

Species
- Gillotia alboviridis; Gillotia trifida

= Gillotia (fungus) =

Genus of fungi

Gillotia is a genus of fungi in the family Mycosphaerellaceae.

The genus name of Gillotia is in honour of François-Xavier Gillot (1842 – 1910), who was a French physician, mycologist and botanist. .

The genus was circumscribed by Pier Andrea Saccardo and Alessandro Trotter in Syll. Fung. vol.22 on page 253 in 1913.
