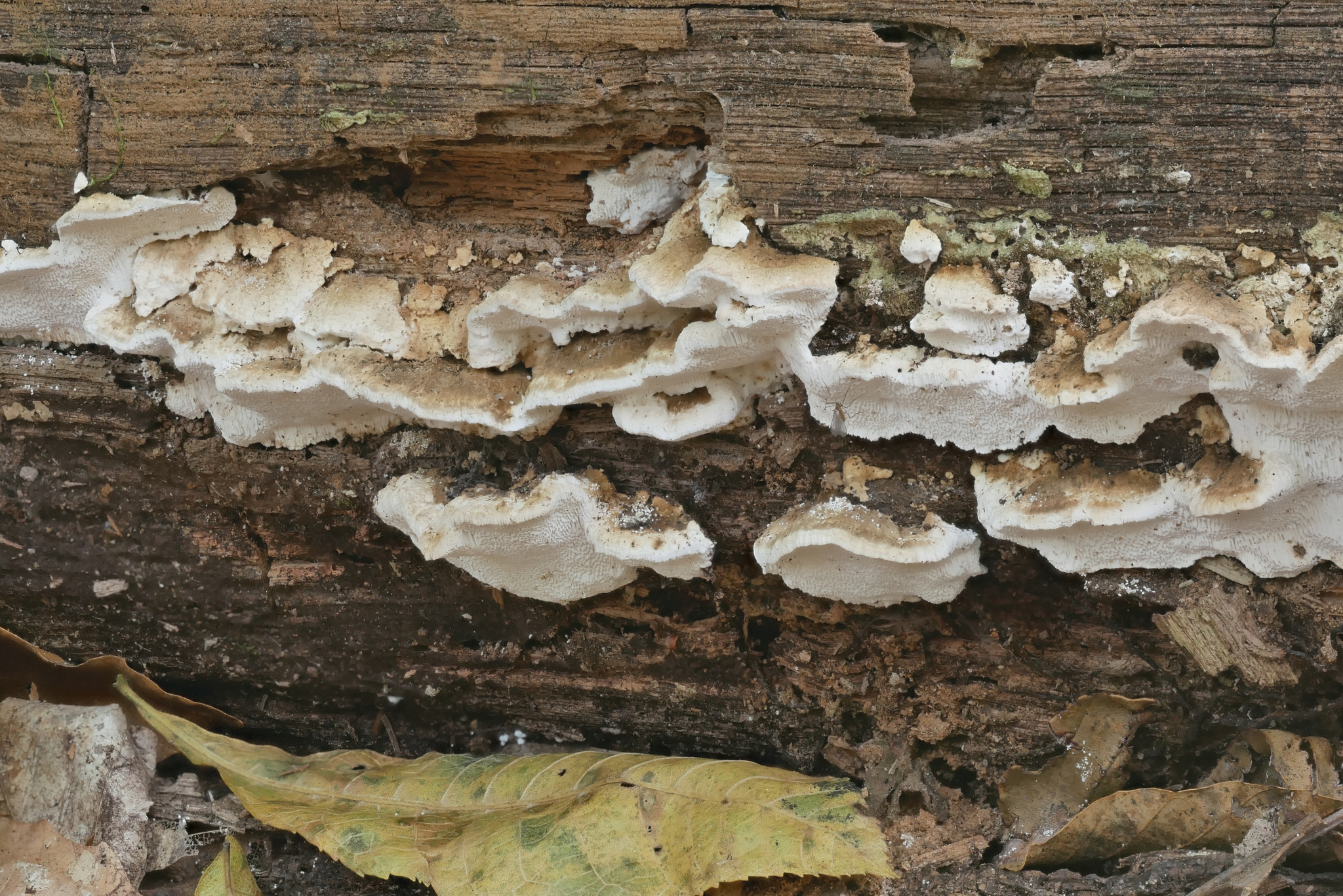

Scientific classification
- Kingdom: Fungi
- Division: Basidiomycota
- Class: Agaricomycetes
- Order: Polyporales
- Family: Fomitopsidaceae
- Genus: Neoantrodia
- Species: N. serialiformis

Binomial name
- Neoantrodia serialiformis (Kout & Vlasák) Audet (2017)

Synonyms
- Antrodia serialiformis Kout & Vlasák (2009)

= Neoantrodia serialiformis =

Species of Agaricomycetes

Neoantrodia serialiformis is a species of polypore fungus in the family Fomitopsidaceae. The fungus is resupinate, consisting of a fertile spore-bearing pore surface lying flat on the underside of decaying wood, although one or more fan-shaped overlapping caps may also be formed. Although quite common in the eastern United States, it was not recognized as a distinct species until 2009, owing to its resemblance to the closely related Neoantrodia serialis. Differences in ecology, spore size, and DNA sequences distinguish the two lookalikes.

== Taxonomy ==
Neoantrodia serialiformis was described as a new species by Jiří Kout and Josef Vlasák in the journal Mycotaxon in 2009. The publication resulted from research conducted by Kout for his 2009 work on ecology and taxonomy of polypores, a PhD dissertation conducted under the supervision of Vlasák. The holotype material was collected from Wissahickon Creek Park (Philadelphia) in 2008; the species description is based on collections made from 2001 to 2008. Vlasák had first noted the presence of the species and its similarity to the common European species Neoantrodia serialis in a 2004 publication. The degree of variability between the DNA sequences of the internal transcribed spacer regions Neoantrodia serialiformis and N. serialis confirm that the two species are genetically distinct. The specific epithet serialiformis refers to its resemblance to N. serialis (the Latin adjective -formis derives from forma, meaning "having the form of"). It was transferred to the genus Neoantrodia in 2017.

Molecular analysis shows that Neoantrodia leucaena, N. infirma, N. primaeva, and N. variiformis are closely related species.

== Description ==
The perennial fruit bodies of N. serialiformis are effused-reflexed (that is, on a vertical surface that is partially lying flat on the substrate with the hymenium covering the upper surface, and partially pileate). In its upper part it has small caps that are often elongated along the growing surface, up to 20 mm (0.8 in) or more in length, with a tough texture. The individual caps, which reach dimensions of up to 10 by 20 mm (0.4 by 0.8 in) by 7 mm (0.3 in), have roughly horizontal upper surfaces that are velvety, and brownish with a narrow white margin. On the underside of the cap, the pore surface is initially white, but turns dirty brown as it matures. The individual pores are round and small, numbering from 3 to 4 per millimeter. The tubes are the same color as the pore surface, and up to 5 mm (0.2 in) deep. The flesh is white and up to 1 mm thick. Fruit bodies are often infested with microlepidoptera species, which causes the pore surface to be powdery.

Neoantrodia serialiformis has a dimitic hyphal system, meaning that predominantly two types of hyphae comprise the fruit body. The generative hyphae (relatively undifferentiated hyphae that can develop reproductive structures) are thin-walled, with clamp connections, and are 2–3 μm wide. The skeletal hyphae (thick-walled and long) predominate; they are hyaline (translucent), straight, and 2–5 μm in width. Cystidia are absent, and cystidioles (cells in the hymenium about the same size as the basidia, but remaining sterile) are inconspicuous. The basidia are club-shaped, four-spored, and have a clamp connection at their bases; they measure 12–18 by 4–6 μm. The thin-walled spores are ellipsoid to somewhat tapered at both ends, hyaline, inamyloid (non-staining in Melzer's reagent), and measure 4.5–5.5 by 2–2.3 μm.

=== Mycelial cultures and compatibility tests ===
Grown on agar plates, the mycelia of N. serialiformis and N. serialis have identical chemical reactivity, and are rather similar in appearance, although the authors note that the former's was more cottony than the latter's. The authors mated several combinations of North American collections using vegetative compatibility tests, and confirmed the presence of different mating alleles—indicating that all of the North American collections represented a single species. Similar pairings performed between North American and European collections showed the species to be incompatible, and therefore distinct.

=== Similar species ===
Neoantrodia serialiformis is similar in appearance to N. serialis, but the latter has larger spores (6.3–8 by 2.2–3.3 μm). The two can be distinguished in the field by their substrate preferences: while N. serialis usually fruits on coniferous wood, N. serialiformis grows strictly on old decorticated oak trunks.

== Habitat and distribution ==
The fungus grows on lying oak logs in Pennsylvania, Maryland, Virginia, North Carolina, and Tennessee. However, owing to its similarity with Neoantrodia serialis, it is likely the two have been confused in the past, and so the true limits of its distribution are unclear. The authors suggests that it probably occurs in other south-eastern states of the US as well, and consider it "one of the most common polypore species in the eastern USA". N. serialiformis is sometimes found together with the much rarer Rhodofomitopsis oleracea, a grayish, strictly resupinate species.
