= François-Xavier Gillot =

French physician, mycologist and botanist

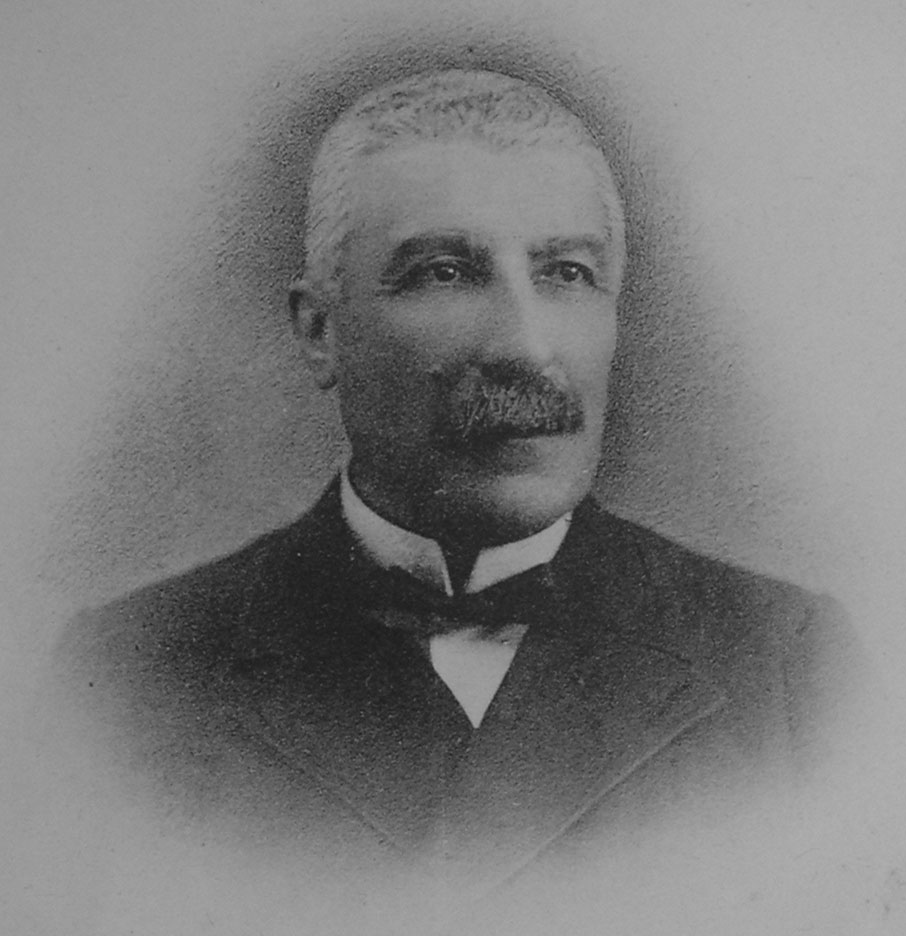
François-Xavier Gillot (1842-1910)

François-Xavier Gillot (12 September 1842, in Autun – 8 October 1910, in Autun) was a French physician, mycologist and botanist.

Gillot was a founding member of the Société d'histoire naturelle d'Autun, and from 1877 was a non-resident member of the Société botanique de Lyon. The fungal genus Gillotia was named in his honor in 1913 by Pier Andrea Saccardo and Alessandro Trotter.

== Selected works ==
- Note sur la flore du plateau d'Antully, 1878 - Note on the flora from the plateau of Antully.
- Notice sur la flore de St. Honoré-les-Bains (Nièvre), 1883 - Notice on the flora of St. Honoré-les-Bains (Nièvre).
- Catalogue raisonné des champignons supérieurs (Hyménomycètes) des environs d'Autun et du département de Saône-et-Loire (with Jean Louis Lucand), 1891 - Catalogue raisonné of superior mushrooms (Hymenomycetes) found in the environs of Autun and the department of Saône-et-Loire.
- Contribution à l'étude des orchidées, 1898 - Contribution to the study of orchids.
