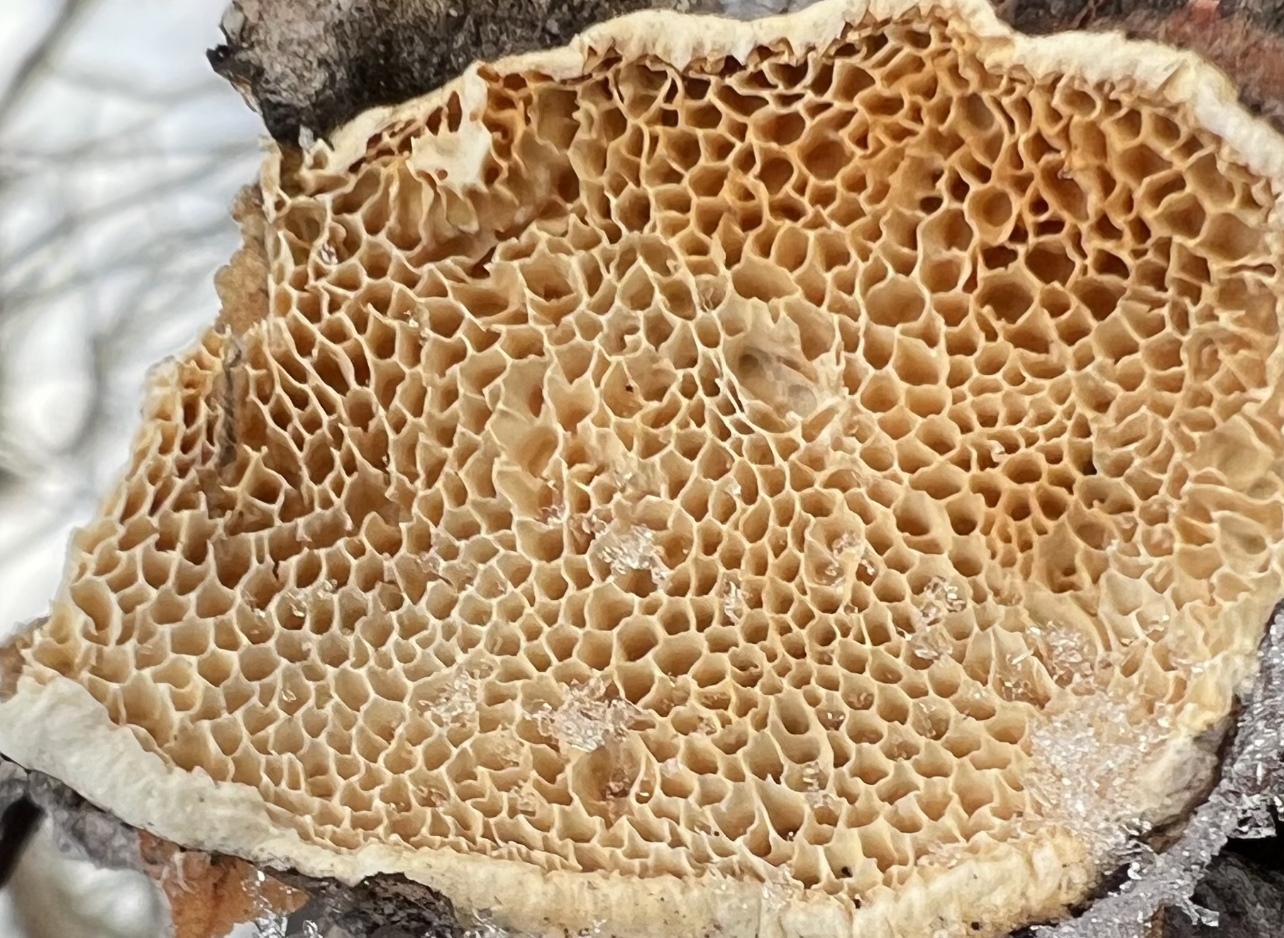

Scientific classification
- Domain: Eukaryota
- Kingdom: Fungi
- Division: Basidiomycota
- Class: Agaricomycetes
- Order: Polyporales
- Family: Fomitopsidaceae
- Genus: Antrodia
- Species: A. ramentacea

Binomial name
- Antrodia ramentacea (Berk. & Broome) Donk (1966)

Synonyms
- List: Polyporus ramentaceus Berk. & Broome (1879); Poria ramentacea (Berk. & Broome) Sacc. (1886); Daedalea ramentacea (Berk. & Broome) Aoshima (1967); Coriolellus ramentaceus (Berk. & Broome) Domański (1971); Cartilosoma ramentaceum (Berk. & Broome) Teixeira (1986); Bjerkandera ramentacea (Berk. & Broome) Teixeira (1992); Trametes subsinuosa Bres. (1903); Polyporus subsinuosus (Bres.) Lind (1913); Coriolellus subsinuosus (Bres.) Bondartsev & Singer (1941); Cartilosoma subsinuosum (Bres.) Kotl. & Pouzar (1958); Trametes subsinuosa var. macronema Bres. (1926); Trametes subsinuosa var. micronema Bres. (1926); Poria ramentacea var. epipolyporea Rick (1937)

= Antrodia ramentacea =

Species of fungus

Antrodia ramentacea is a species of polypore fungus in the family Fomitopsidaceae, first described in 1879 by Miles Joseph Berkeley and Broome and transferred into its current genus by Marinus Anton Donk in 1966.

== Distribution and habitat ==
It appears in North America, Europe and Asia, most often in Europe. It usually grows on dead conifer wood, mostly pine and spruce.
