= Jean Louis Lucand =

French mycologist and mycological artist

Jean Louis Lucand (11 November 1821, Beauvilliers, Yonne – 19 November 1896) was a French mycologist and mycological artist.

A career soldier, he served in the French military from 1842 to 1873. In 1866 he was named captain and a chevalier in the Legion of Honor. Following retirement from the army, he moved to the community of Autun, where he focused his energies on mycology.

He was a founding member of the Société mycologique de France, and also a member of the Société d'histoire naturelle du Creusot and the Société d'histoire naturelle et des amis du muséum d'Autun. The species Rosa lucandiana was named in his honor by François-Xavier Gillot and Pierre Alfred Déséglise.

== Selected works ==
- "Drawings of mushrooms by Jean Louis Lucand" (published in 1875 in English)
- Figures peintes de champignons de la France, suite à la geographie de Bulliard; fasc. 1-17. – Painted figures of mushrooms native to France, geography suite of Jean Baptiste François Pierre Bulliard, fascicles 1 to 17.
- Champignons comestibles et vénéneux des environs d'Autun, 1886 – Edible and poisonous mushrooms from the vicinity of Autun.
- Catalogue raisonné des champignons supérieurs (Hyménomyétes) des environs d'Autun et du département de Saône-et-Loire (with François-Xavier Gillot), 1891 - Catalogue raisonné of major fungi (Hymenomycete) from the vicinity of Autun, Saône-et-Loire.
- Les Champignons de la France, suite à l' iconographie de Bulliard, 1892 – Mushrooms of France, iconography suite of Jean Baptiste François Pierre Bulliard.
