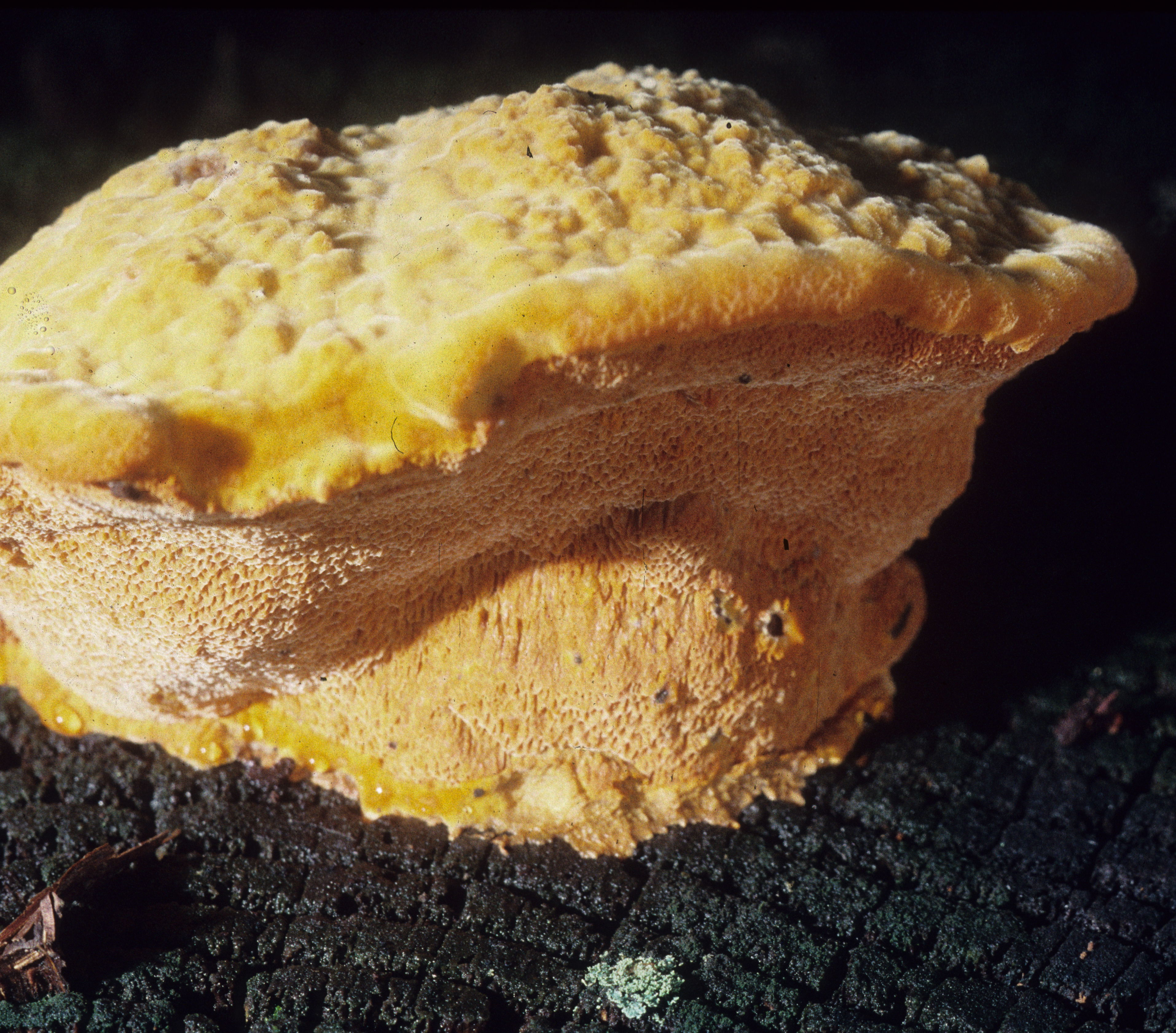

Conservation status
- Vulnerable (IUCN 3.1)

Scientific classification
- Kingdom: Fungi
- Division: Basidiomycota
- Class: Agaricomycetes
- Order: Polyporales
- Family: Polyporaceae
- Genus: Hapalopilus
- Species: H. croceus

Binomial name
- Hapalopilus croceus (Pers.) Donk (1933)

Synonyms
- List: Boletus croceus Pers. (1796); Polyporus croceus (Pers.) Fr. (1815); Inonotus croceus (Pers.) P.Karst. (1882); Ochroporus croceus (Pers.) J.Schröt. (1888); Phaeolus croceus (Pers.) Pat. (1900); Polystictus croceus (Pers.) Bigeard & H.Guill. (1913); Aurantiporus croceus (Pers.) Murrill (1920); Tyromyces croceus (Pers.) J.Lowe (1975)

= Hapalopilus croceus =

Species of polypore fungus

Hapalopilus croceus is a species of polypore fungus. It was originally described by Christian Hendrik Persoon in 1796 as Boletus croceus; Marinus Anton Donk transferred it to the genus Hapalopilus in 1933 to give it the name by which it is currently known. The species is found in Asia, Europe, Oceania, and North America, where it grows on the rotting wood of deciduous trees.

== Description ==
Hapalopilus croceus produces conspicuous, bright orange, fleshy, annual pileate fruit bodies (sporocarps) that form on coarse veteran oak wood.

Hapalopilus croceus
- Mycological characteristics
- Pores on hymenium
- Cap is flat
- Hymenium attachment is not applicable
- Lacks a stipe
- Spore print is white
- Ecology is saprotrophic
- Edibility is inedible

== Habitat, distribution and ecology ==
Hapalopilus croceu is a white-rot polypore that specialises in decaying coarse, veteran oak wood and, more rarely, Castanea wood. It occurs throughout the temperate zone of the Northern Hemisphere, with confirmed records from eastern North America, Europe, China and Japan, but its core range is in Europe, where it is confined to old, large-stemmed oaks. The species is globally rare and highly fragmented; in most European countries where it persists it is nationally threatened, and it is assessed as Vulnerable on the IUCN Red List owing to the historic loss of ancient oak habitats through intensified land use.

As a white rot fungus, H. croceus breaks down lignin and cellulose in living or recently dead oak wood, producing conspicuous bright orange, fleshy annual fruit bodies. Its extensive, long-lived mycelium can persist in the same host for decades or even centuries, resulting in repeated fruiting at the same site. Most spores are deposited close to the parent sporocarp, so colonization of new hosts relies on the proximity and continuity of suitable veteran oaks. The species has a bipolar mating system, which enhances the chance of sibling spore compatibility in fragmented populations but may also limit genetic diversity where stands are small and isolated.

== Conservation ==
Although the orange polypore once colonised veteran oaks and chestnuts across eastern North America, Europe and eastern Asia, its populations have plummeted over the past two centuries as mature host trees were felled or lost to land-use change. In Europe—where the species has been recorded from some 25 countries, from the Mediterranean basin to southern Scandinavia—it is nationally red-listed in eleven countries: Critically endangered in Norway, Finland, Sweden, Croatia, Germany, Denmark, Estonia and Austria; Endangered in Czechia, Latvia, Romania and Poland; and Vulnerable in Slovakia. The decline of veteran oak stands by at least 30 % over the past three generations has driven its assessment as Vulnerable under IUCN criteria A2c + 3c + 4c, and declines are expected to continue.

The principal threat to H. croceus remains loss and degradation of old-growth oak–chestnut woodlands, together with removal of coarse woody debris on which it depends. Each tree typically supports a single long-lived mycelium, so the absence of uneven-aged host cohorts creates an ecological bottleneck that hampers recolonisation at low population densities. According to the IUCN, conservation efforts should prioritise protection of existing veteran oaks and establishment of intermediate-aged cohorts in both forests and agricultural landscapes, retention of large standing and fallen trunks, and research into its population biology, dispersal ecology and potential for mycelial inoculation.
