= Cry, Yonne =

Cry
- Commune
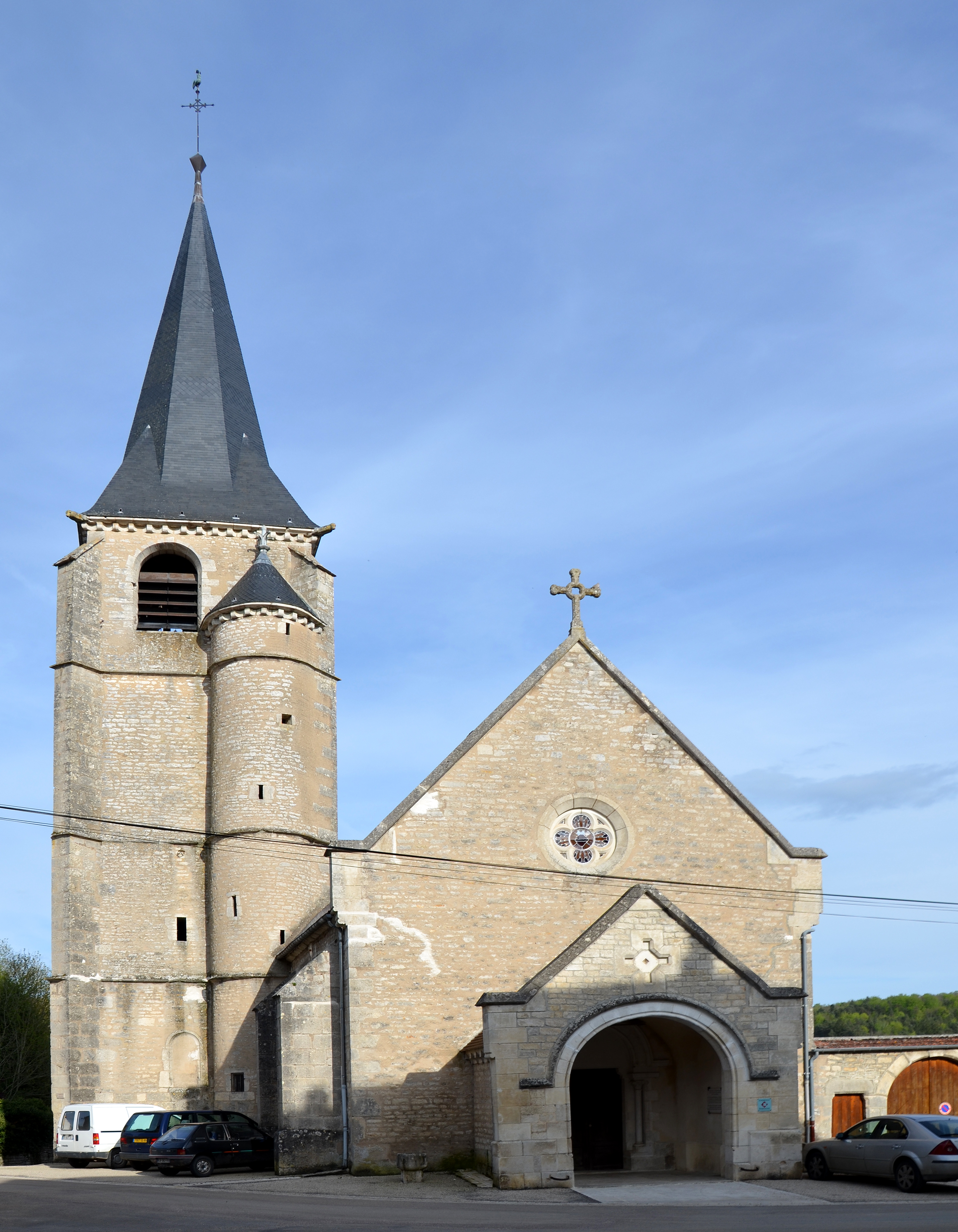
- The church in Cry
- Location of Cry
- Location within France Location within Bourgogne-Franche-Comté
- Coordinates: 47°42′29″N 4°14′20″E
- Country: France
- Region: Bourgogne-Franche-Comté
- Department: Yonne
- Arrondissement: Avallon
- Canton: Tonnerrois

Government
  - Mayor (2020–2026): José de Pinho
- Area^{1}: 11.16 km^{2} (4.31 sq mi)
- Elevation: 198 m (650 ft)
- Highest elevation: 292 m (958 ft)
- Lowest elevation: 184 m (604 ft)
- Population (2023): 157
  - Density: 14.1/km^{2} (36.4/sq mi)
- Time zone: UTC+01:00 (CET)
  - Summer (DST): UTC+02:00 (CEST)
- INSEE/Postal code: 89132 /89390
- ^{1} French Land Register data, which excludes lakes, ponds, glaciers > 1 km^{2} (0.386 sq mi or 247 acres) and river estuaries.

Cry (pronounced [kʁi], CREE) is a commune in the Yonne department in Bourgogne-Franche-Comté in north-central France.

== Demography ==
Historical population
Year	Pop.	±% p.a.
1968	220	—
1975	232	+0.76%
1982	215	−1.08%
1990	181	−2.13%
1999	170	−0.69%
2007	179	+0.65%
2012	182	+0.33%
2017	170	−1.35%
2023	157	−1.32%
Source: INSEE

== See also ==
- Communes of the Yonne department
