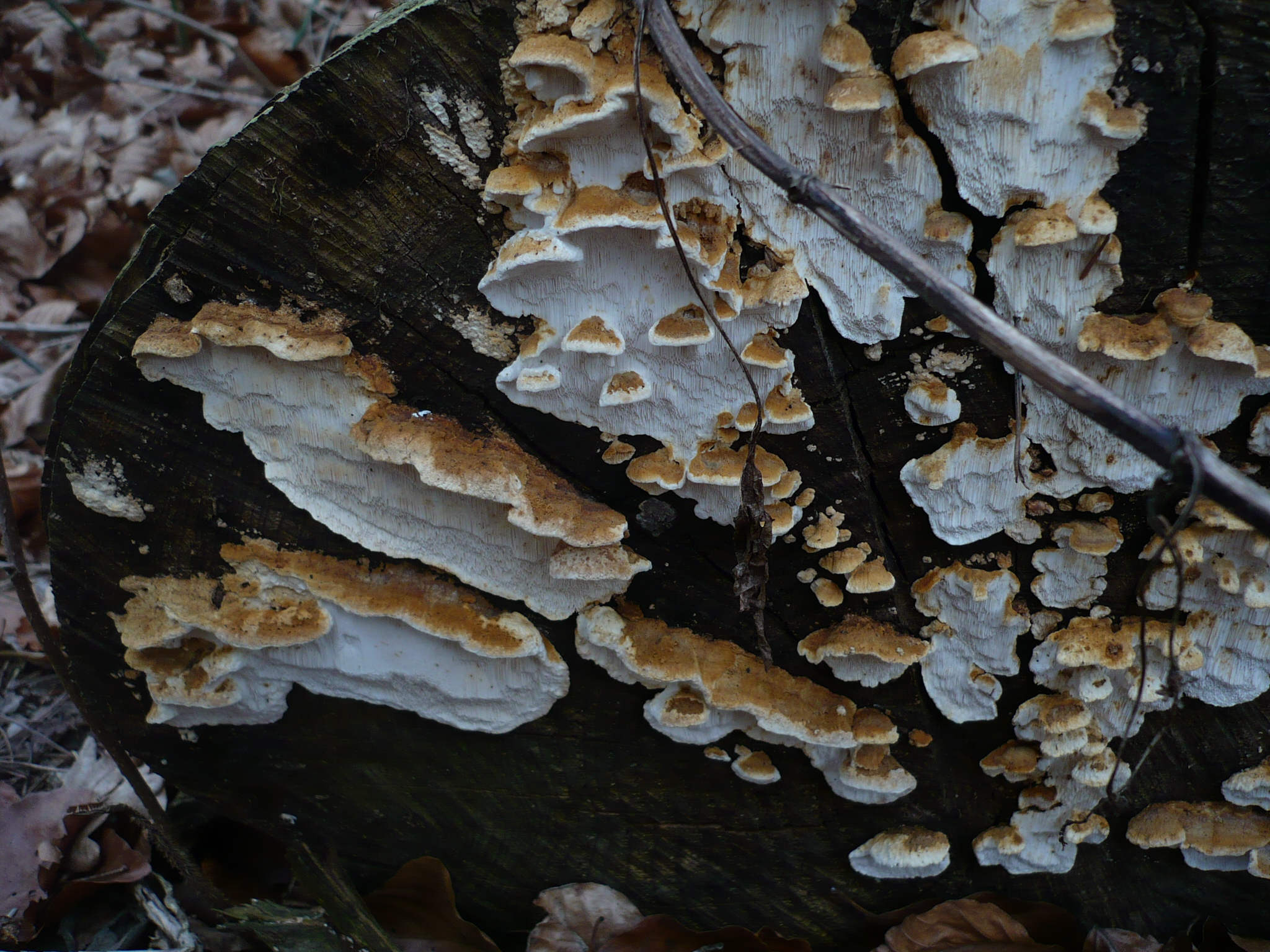

Scientific classification
- Domain: Eukaryota
- Kingdom: Fungi
- Division: Basidiomycota
- Class: Agaricomycetes
- Order: Polyporales
- Family: Fomitopsidaceae
- Genus: Neoantrodia
- Species: N. serialis

Binomial name
- Neoantrodia serialis (Fr.) Audet (2017)

Synonyms
- List: Polyporus serialis Fr. (1821); Boletus serialis (Fr.) Spreng. (1827); Trametes serialis (Fr.) Fr. (1874); Fomitopsis serialis (Fr.) P. Karst. (1881); Polystictus serialis (Fr.) Cooke (1886); Pycnoporus serialis (Fr.) P. Karst. (1889); Coriolellus serialis (Fr.) Murrill (1907); Coriolus serialis (Fr.) Komarova (1964); Antrodia serialis (Fr.) Donk (1966); Daedalea serialis (Fr.) Aoshima (1967); Poria echinata Hoffm. (1811); Polyporus echinatus (Hoffm.) Pers. (1825); Poria favoginea Hoffm. (1811); Trametes scutata var. favoginea (Hoffm.) Harz (1888); Polyporus callosus Fr. (1821); Physisporus callosus (Fr.) P. Karst. (1881); Poria callosa (Fr.) Quél. (1886); Coriolellus callosus (Fr.) M.P. Christ. (1960); Coriolellus serialis f. callosus (Fr.) Domański (1965); Trametes contigua Wettst. (1888); Polyporus favogineus (Hoffm. ex Harz) Wettst. (1888); Polyporus vaporarius var. favogineus Hoffm. ex Harz (1888); Trametes serialis f. ptychogaster Mez (1908); Coriolellus serialis f. ptychogaster (Mez) Domański (1965); Polyporus fechtneri Velen. (1922); Polyporus pallidissimus Velen. (1922); Polyporus pseudoannosus Velen. (1922); Trametes serialis var. resupinata Bourdot & Galzin (1925); Coriolus serialis f. resupinatus (Bourdot & Galzin) Komarova (1964); Trametes serialis f. corallopoda Pilát (1927); Coriolellus serialis f. corallopodus (Pilát) Domański (1965); Trametes serialis f. tuberosa Pilát (1929); Coriolellus serialis f. tuberosus (Pilát) Domański (1965); Coriolellus serialis f. resupinatostratosa Domański (1962); Coriolellus serialis f. resupinatostratosus Domański (1962)

= Neoantrodia serialis =

Species of fungus

Neoantrodia serialis is a species of polypore fungus in the family Fomitopsidaceae. Originally named Polyporus serialis by Elias Fries in 1821, it was transferred to its current genus by Canadian mycologist Serge Audet in 2017. A widespread species, N. serialis causes heart rot in living trees. In North America, it is often confused with the morphologically similar Neoantrodia serialiformis, which grows on oak.
