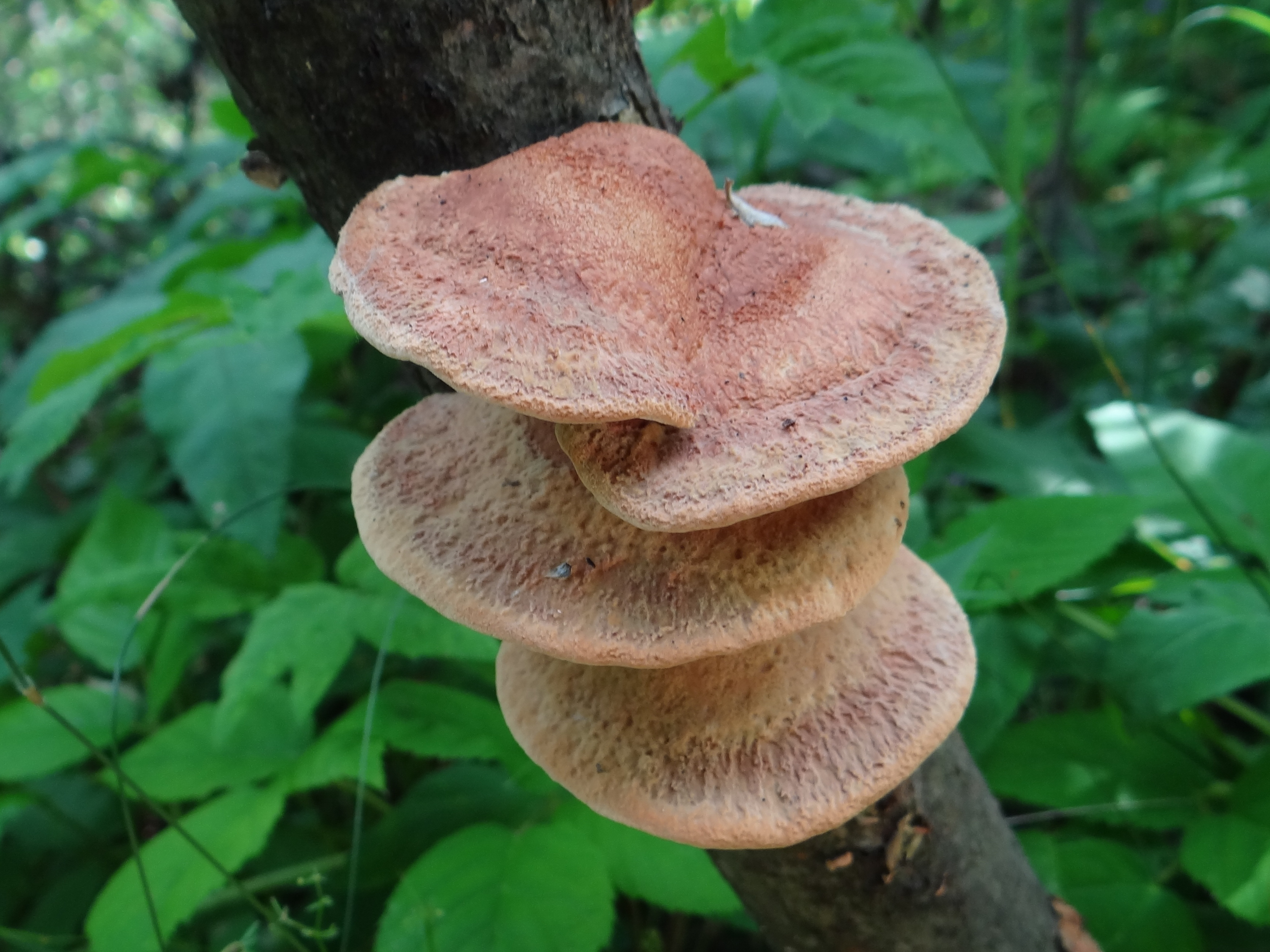
- Hapalopilus nidulans

Scientific classification
- Domain: Eukaryota
- Kingdom: Fungi
- Division: Basidiomycota
- Class: Agaricomycetes
- Order: Polyporales
- Family: Polyporaceae
- Genus: Hapalopilus; P.Karst. (1881)

Type species
- Hapalopilus nidulans (Fr.) P.Karst. (1881)

Synonyms
- Sarcoporia P.Karst. (1881)

= Hapalopilus =

Genus of fungi

Hapalopilus is a genus of poroid fungi in the family Polyporaceae. The genus is widely distributed. The generic name combines the Ancient Greek words ἁπαλός ("tender") and πιλος ("cap"). Hapalopilus was circumscribed by Finnish mycologist Petter Adolf Karsten in 1881.

== Species ==
As of June 2017, Index Fungorum accepts 15 species of Hapalopilus:

- Hapalopilus africanus Ryvarden 1978 – Rwanda
- Hapalopilus albocitrinus (Petch) Ryvarden 1980 – Uganda
- Hapalopilus croceus (Pers.) Donk 1933 – Europe
- Hapalopilus flavus B.K.Cui & Y.C.Dai 2008 – China
- Hapalopilus hispidulus (Berk. & M.A.Curtis) Murrill 1904
- Hapalopilus mutans (Peck) Gilb. & Ryvarden 1986
- Hapalopilus nidulans (Fr.) P.Karst. 1881 – widespread
- Hapalopilus ochraceolateritius (Bondartsev) Bondartsev & Singer 1941 – Europe
- Hapalopilus phlebiiformis (Berk. ex Cooke) Ryvarden 1987
- Hapalopilus placodes (Kalchbr.) N.Walters & E.W.B.Costa 1956 – Lord Howe Island
- Hapalopilus priscus (Niemelä, Miettinen & Manninen) Melo & Ryvarden (2014)
- Hapalopilus rubescens Corner 1989
- Hapalopilus sibiricus Núñez, Parmasto & Ryvarden 2001
- Hapalopilus subtestaceus (Bres.) Bondartsev 1963
- Hapalopilus tropicus I.Lindblad & Ryvarden 1999
