= Hymenomycete =

Former group of fungi

Hymenomycetes was formerly the largest taxonomic group of fungi within the division Basidiomycota, but the term is no longer taxonomically relevant. Many familiar fungi belong to this class, including bracket fungi and toadstools. This class contained the orders Agaricales, Boletales, and Russulales.

The erstwhile class, now understood to be a polyphyletic assemblage of basidiomycetes, refers to fungi with fruit bodies whose hymenophore develops in an exposed manner, or only with a veil (velum). These forms are termed gymnocarpic or hemiangiocarpic ontogeny, respectively. A contrasting example of hymenophore development is the puffballs, which undergo gasterocarpic development (hymenophore enclosed).

== See also ==
- Agaricomycetes
