= Ernst Hans Ludwig Krause =

German physician, botanist and mycologist

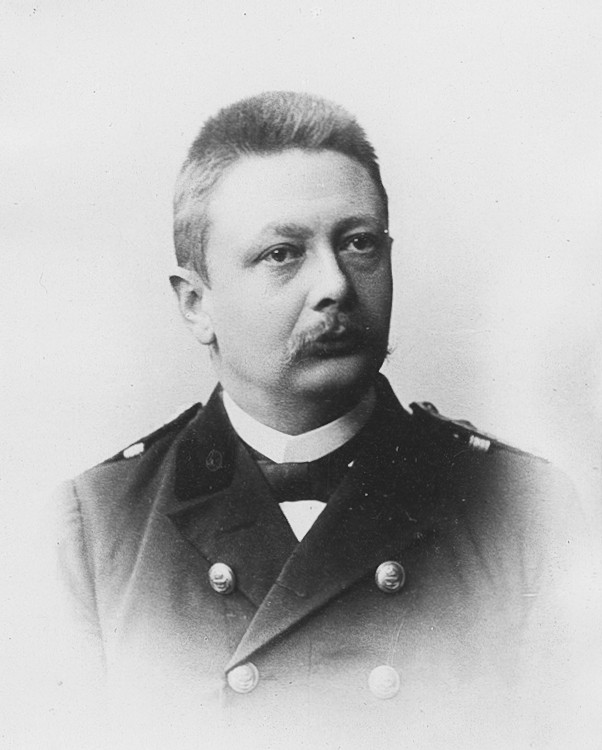
Ernst Hans Ludwig Krause (1859–1942)

Ernst Hans Ludwig Krause (27 July 1859 in Stade – 1 June 1942 in Domjüch/Neustrelitz) was a German physician, botanist and mycologist.

He studied medicine and botany in Berlin, where in 1881 he received his medical doctorate. From 1882 to 1893 he served as a naval medical officer, and later spent several years as a physician to an infantry regiment. From 1904 to 1918, he gave lectures on plant systematics and phytogeography at the University of Strasbourg, and afterwards, relocated to the University of Rostock, where from 1921 to 1933, he was an associate professor of botany. From 1933 onward, he worked as a general practitioner in Rostock. In 1942, he was wounded during a bombing attack in Rostock.

== Works ==
- Flora von Rostock (1879, co-author Carl Fisch).
- Pflanzengeographische Übersicht der Flora von Mecklenburg, Güstrow : Opitz, (1884).
- Flora der Insel St. Vincent in der Cap verdengruppe, Leipzig : W. Engelmann (1891).
- Mecklenburgische Flora. 1893. In Jacob Sturm's Flora von Deutschland, second edition (1900–1907).
- Florenkarte von Norddeutschland fur das 12. bis 15. Jahrhundert 231–35.
- In Globus 72. Band, 1897 - Illustrierte Zeitschrift für Länder- und Völkerkunde.
  - Neuere Forschungen in Chichen-Itza (Yucatan), S.200-206, 8 Abb., S.219-223, 8 Abb.
  - E. Deschamps Reise auf Cypern (S.328-331, 5 Abb., S.347-351, 6 Abb.). Die englisch-französischen Streitfragen in Westafrika.
- Fungorum Rostochiensium tabulae X, Rostock : Winterberg, (1927).
- Basidiomycetes Rostochiensis, Rostock Winterberg (1928).
- Mecklenburgs Basidiomyceten, das sind die Poggenstühle und verwandten Schwämme (With Walter Dahnke), Rostock : E.H.L. Krause, (1934).
