= Alessandro Trotter =

Italian entomologist (1874–1967)

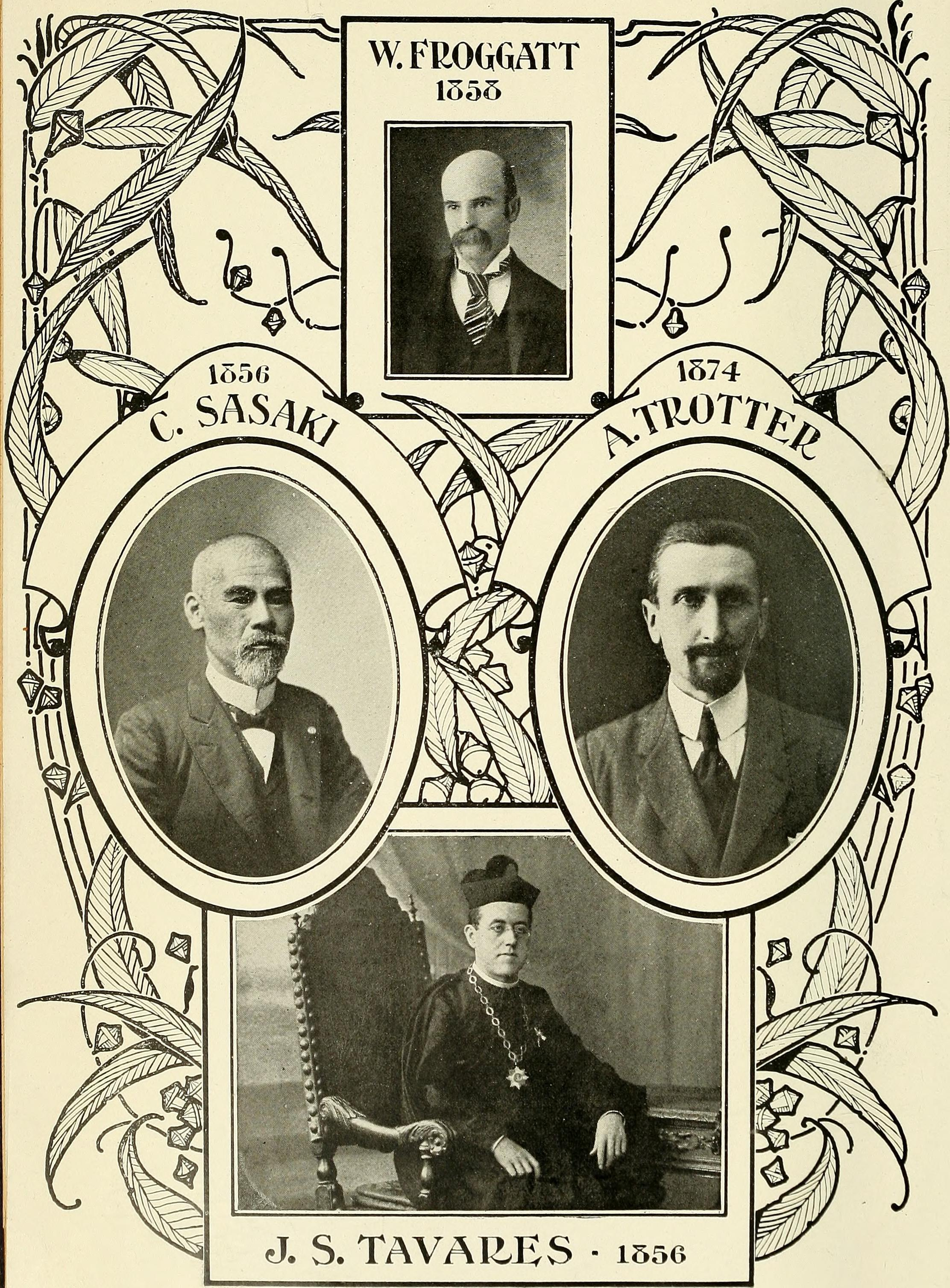
Trotter (right) and other scientists

Alessandro Trotter (26 July 1874 – 22 July 1967) was an Italian botanist and entomologist who pioneered in cecidology, the study of plant galls.

== Biography ==
Trotter's first work on cecidology dated back to 1897, and he reported 124 galls, of which 21 were caused by eriophyid mites. Trotter travelled around Italy between 1899 and 1909 and described 742 galls in 20 papers. Together with Giacomo Cecconi he issued the exsiccata Cecidotheca Italica o raccolta di galle Italiane determinate, preparate ed illustrate. At the age of 28, he founded a journal called Marcella in honour of Marcello Malpighi which dealt with cecidology.

He later became professor of plant pathology at the University of Naples and wrote more than 400 publications with nearly 110 on plant galls. He described several new species of Cynipidae and Cecidomyiidae some with Jean-Jacques Kieffer.

Trotter was the son-in-law of Pier Andrea Saccardo (1845–1920).

== Works ==
Partial List

- Flora Italica Cryptogamica. Pars I: Fungi. Fasc. IV. Uredinales (Genera: Uromyces et Puccinia). (1908).
- Sylloge Fungorum 23: i-xxxii, (1925).
- Sylloge Fungorum 24 (1): 1–703 (1926).
- Sylloge Fungorum 24 (2): 704–1438 (1928).

== Bibliography ==
- Cesare Conci et Roberto Poggi (1996), Iconography of Italian Entomologists, with essential biographical data. Memorie della Società entomologica Italiana, 75: 159–382.
