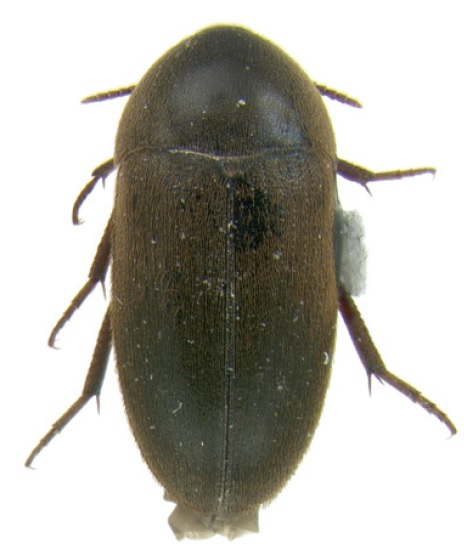

Scientific classification
- Domain: Eukaryota
- Kingdom: Animalia
- Phylum: Arthropoda
- Class: Insecta
- Order: Coleoptera
- Suborder: Polyphaga
- Infraorder: Cucujiformia
- Family: Tetratomidae
- Genus: Eustrophus
- Species: E. tomentosus

Binomial name
- Eustrophus tomentosus Say, 1827

= Eustrophus tomentosus =

Species of beetle

Eustrophus tomentosus is a species of polypore fungus beetle in the family Tetratomidae. It is found in North America.

This species contains characteristic yellowish-orange setae abundant throughout elytra surface.

It is able to be distinguished from Eustrophopsis through the absence of a prothoracic episterna transverse suture.
