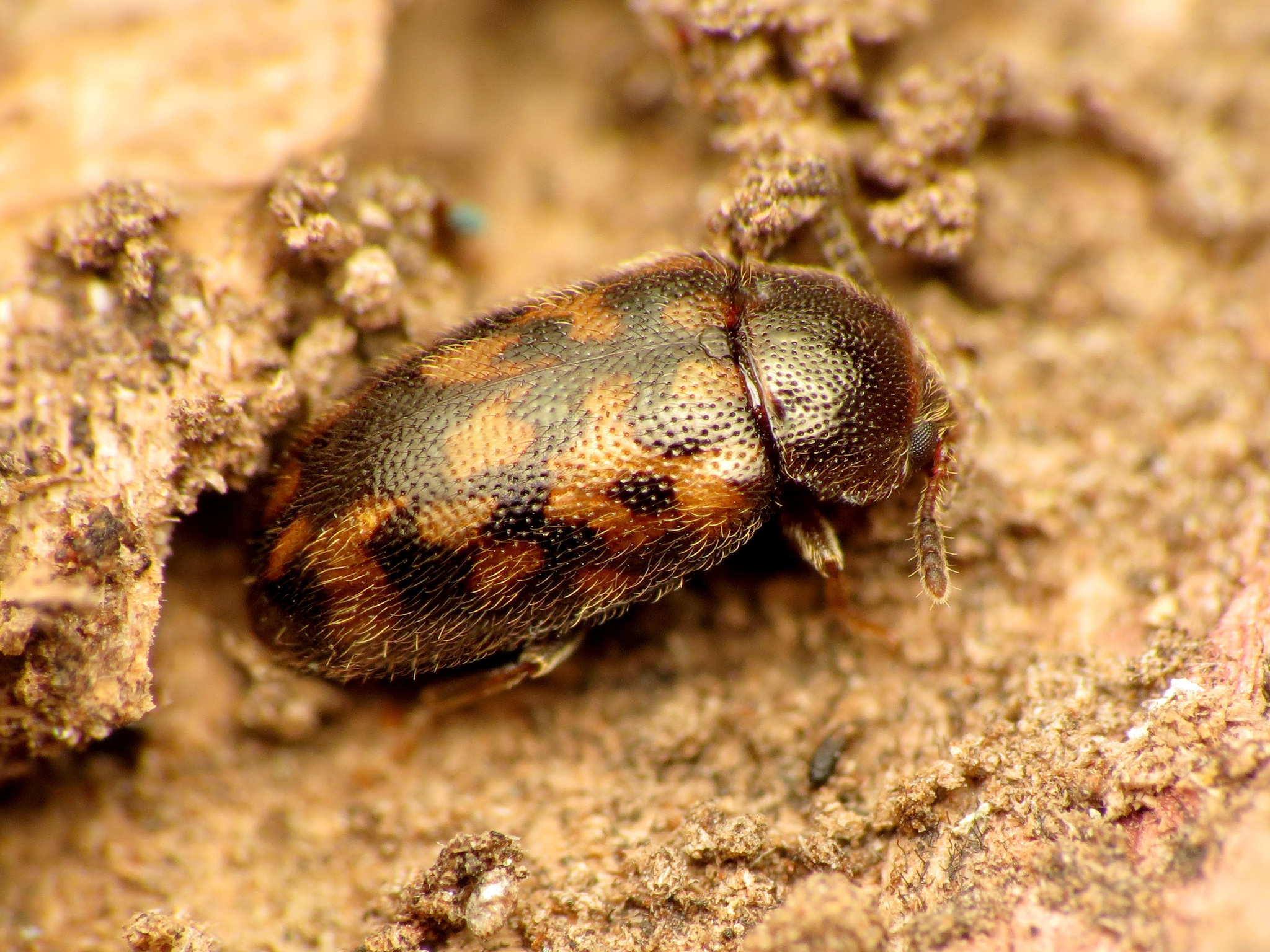

Scientific classification
- Domain: Eukaryota
- Kingdom: Animalia
- Phylum: Arthropoda
- Class: Insecta
- Order: Coleoptera
- Suborder: Polyphaga
- Infraorder: Cucujiformia
- Family: Tetratomidae
- Genus: Tetratoma
- Species: T. tessellata

Binomial name
- Tetratoma tessellata Melsheimer, 1844

= Tetratoma tessellata =

Species of beetle

Tetratoma tessellata is a species of polypore fungus beetle in the family Tetratomidae. It is found in North America.
