= Holostrophus toyoshimai =

Scientific classification
- Domain: Eukaryota
- Kingdom: Animalia
- Phylum: Arthropoda
- Class: Insecta
- Order: Coleoptera
- Suborder: Polyphaga
- Infraorder: Cucujiformia
- Family: Tetratomidae
- Genus: Holostrophus
- Species: H. toyoshimai

Binomial name
- Holostrophus toyoshimai Saitȏ & Konvička, 2017

Species of beetle

Holostrophus toyoshimai is a species of polypore fungus beetle in the family Tetratomidae. Being identified in 2017 by Masahiro Saitȏ and Ondřej Konvička, Holostrophus toyoshimai was identified upon the discovery of five specimens located within central Honshu to which they were identified as a new species.

Due to the presence of a prothoracic hypomera with weak punctures and without distinct furrows between these punctures, this species was assigned to the subgenus Paraholostrophus.

This species, broadly, exhibits an elongate, oval body that is noted to be evenly rounded with the presence of thin, short yellowish-white lustered pubescence. Furthermore, such dense pubescence can be located throughout the legs, antennae, and the entirety of the abdomen. More specifically, in addition to the short yellowish-white lustered pubescence, yellowish-brown pubescence can also be exclusively located on the abdomen. Moreover, the dorsal surface is noted to be entirely brownish-black with dark, reddish-brown colorations to the basal angle areas of the pronotum. A pair of cuneiform markings along the suture of the middle elytra is noted to be present alongside a pair of sub apical bands reaching the outer margins of the elytra. At times, these markings are noted to be partly connected by thin line. The head and antennae are noted to be dark orange. The legs are noted to be reddish-brown. The ventral surface is entirely dark orange.

Holostrophus toyoshimai morphologically resembles Holostrophus orientalis, but it is distinguished from the latter by the following characters:

1. The lobes of parameters in males are approximately 2.5 times as long as wide in Holostrophus toyoshimai while they are only about 2.0 times as long as wide in Holostrophus orientalis.
2. The projections of the anterior margin of the anterior band on elytra do not reach the base of the elytra, and the black areas at the base of the elytra are divided.

This species' name was dedicated in honor to Kentarô Toyoshima who collected the study's specimens.
