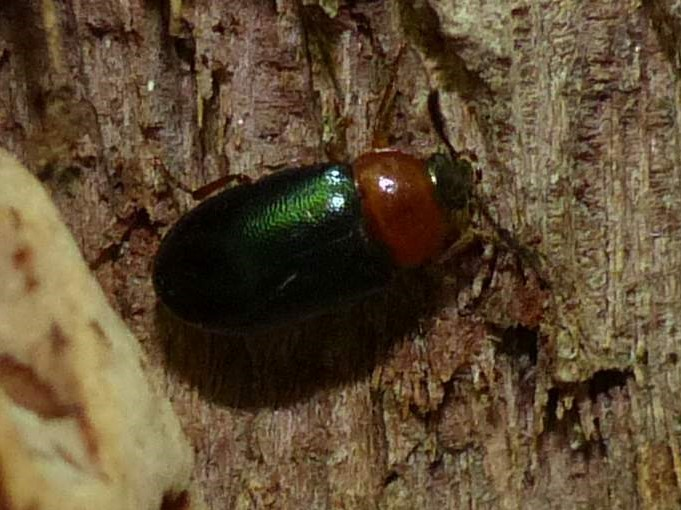

Scientific classification
- Kingdom: Animalia
- Phylum: Arthropoda
- Class: Insecta
- Order: Coleoptera
- Suborder: Polyphaga
- Infraorder: Cucujiformia
- Family: Tetratomidae
- Genus: Tetratoma
- Species: T. truncorum

Binomial name
- Tetratoma truncorum LeConte, 1866

= Tetratoma truncorum =

Species of beetle

Tetratoma truncorum is a species of polypore fungus beetle in the family Tetratomidae. It is found in North America.
