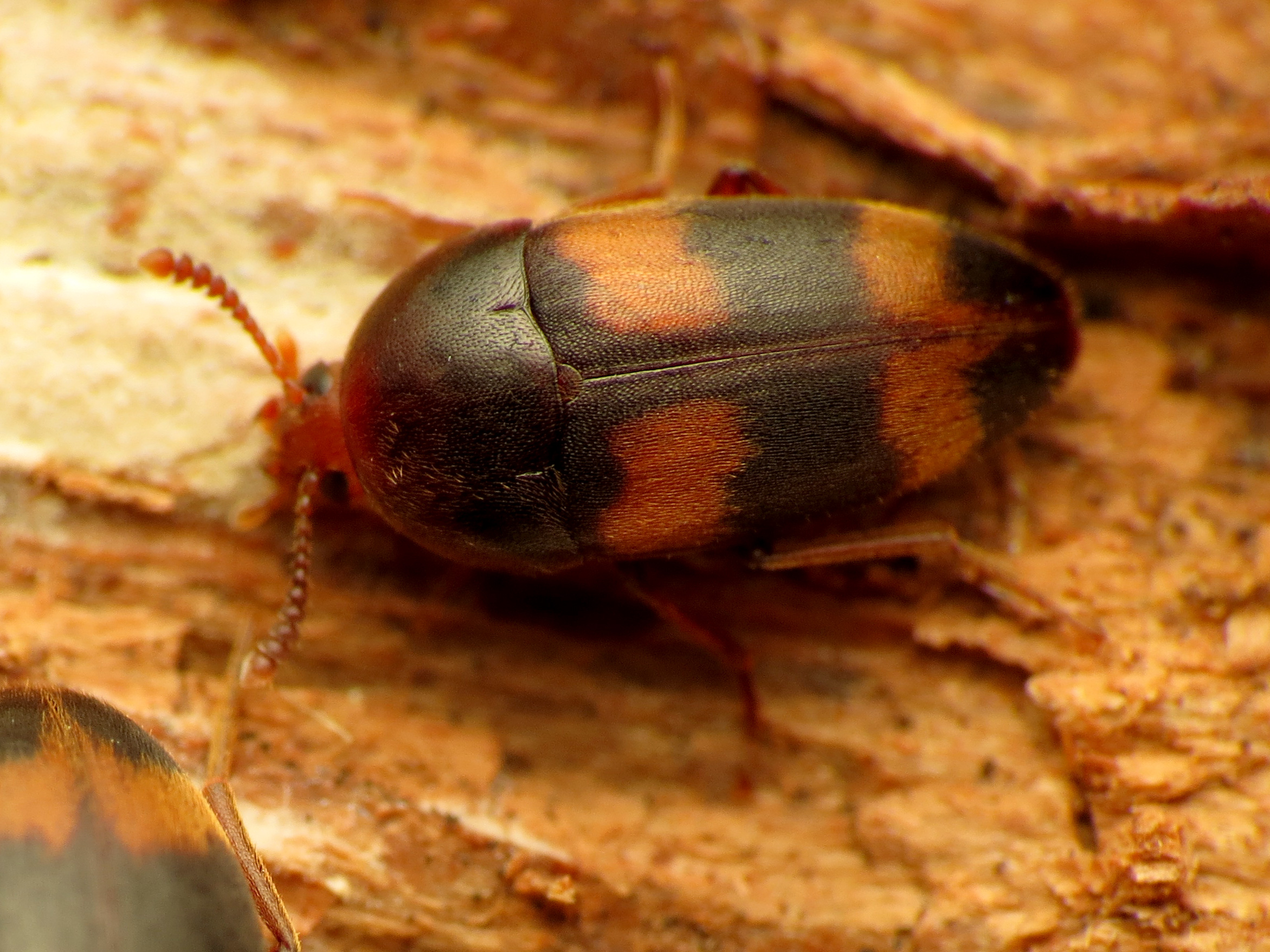

Scientific classification
- Domain: Eukaryota
- Kingdom: Animalia
- Phylum: Arthropoda
- Class: Insecta
- Order: Coleoptera
- Suborder: Polyphaga
- Infraorder: Cucujiformia
- Family: Tetratomidae
- Genus: Holostrophus
- Species: H. bifasciatus

Binomial name
- Holostrophus bifasciatus (Say, 1824)

Synonyms
- Eustrophus bifasciatus Say, 1824

= Holostrophus bifasciatus =

Species of beetle

Holostrophus bifasciatus is a species of polypore fungus beetle in the family Tetratomidae. It is found in North America.

This is the only Nearctic species within the subfamily Eustrophinae with a characteristic, quadrimaculate, elytral color pattern. Elytra is typically dark with quad, lighter-colored areas.

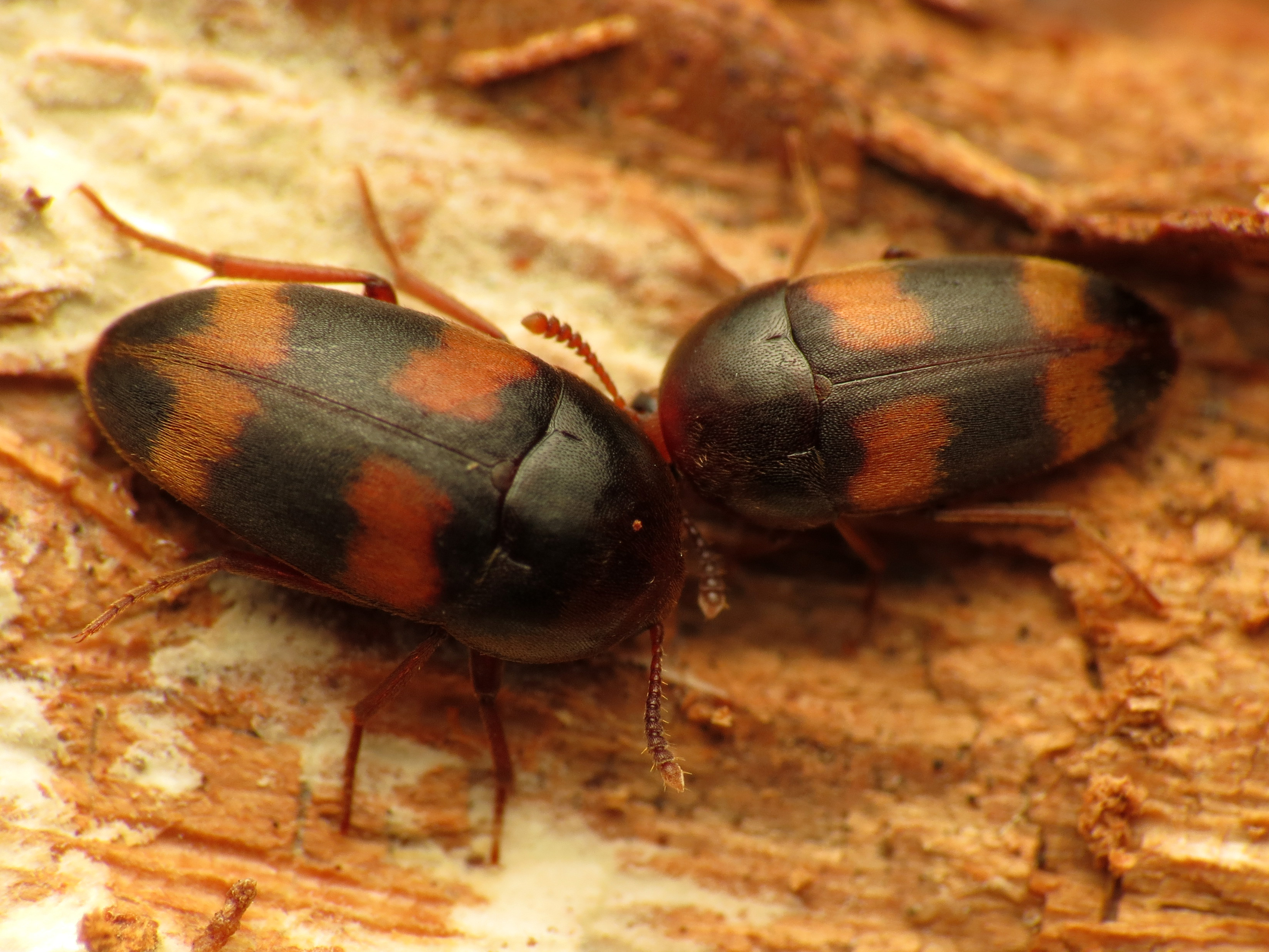
