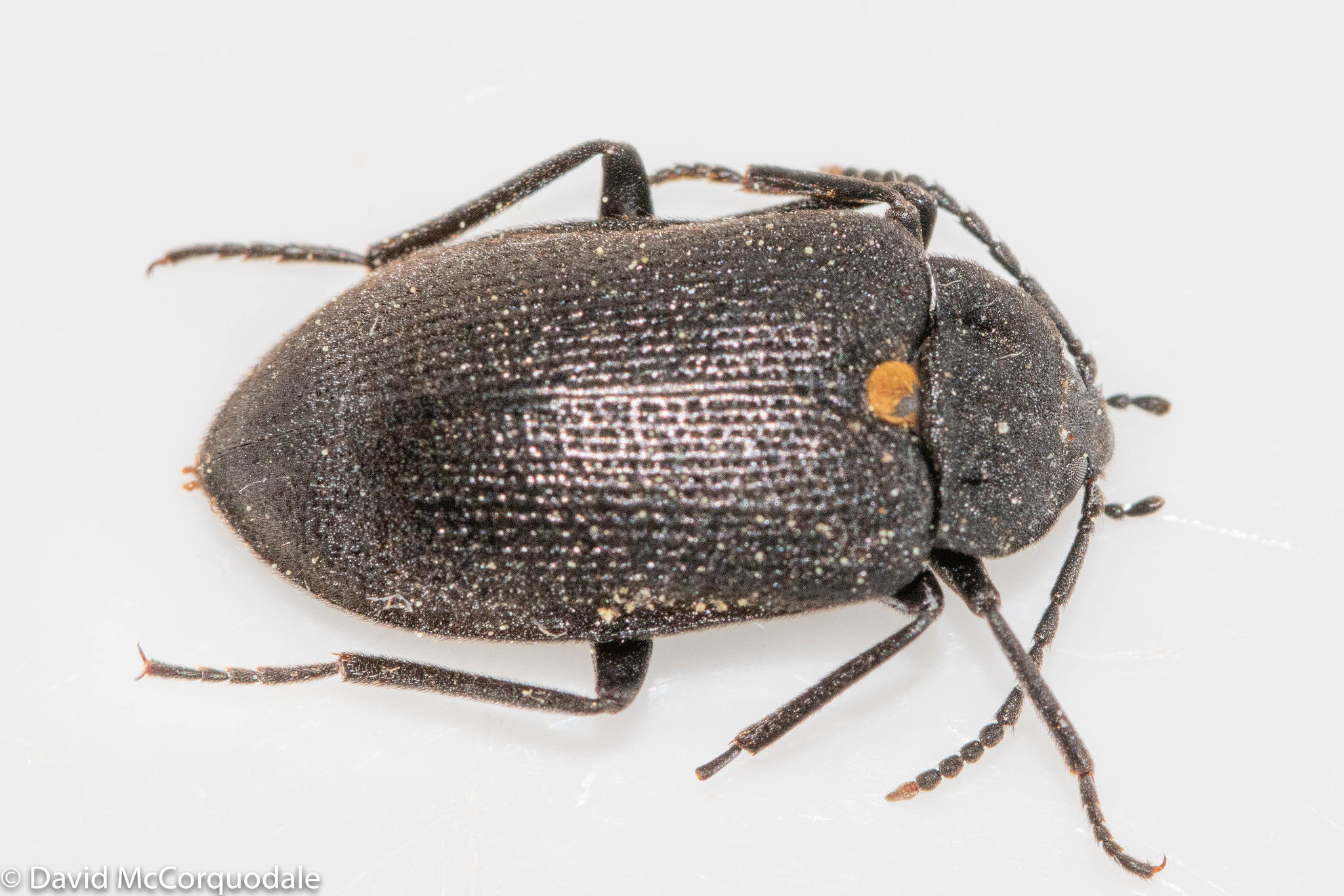

Scientific classification
- Kingdom: Animalia
- Phylum: Arthropoda
- Clade: Pancrustacea
- Class: Insecta
- Order: Coleoptera
- Suborder: Polyphaga
- Infraorder: Cucujiformia
- Family: Tetratomidae
- Genus: Penthe
- Species: P. obliquata

Binomial name
- Penthe obliquata (Fabricius, 1801)

= Penthe obliquata =

Species of beetle

Penthe obliquata, also known as the oblique polypore fungus beetle, is a species of polypore fungus beetle in the family Tetratomidae. It is found in North America.

This species is primarily dark-colored with a characteristic, brightly-orange scutellum which distinguishes it from the only other species of Penthe in North America: Penthe pimelia.

== Description ==
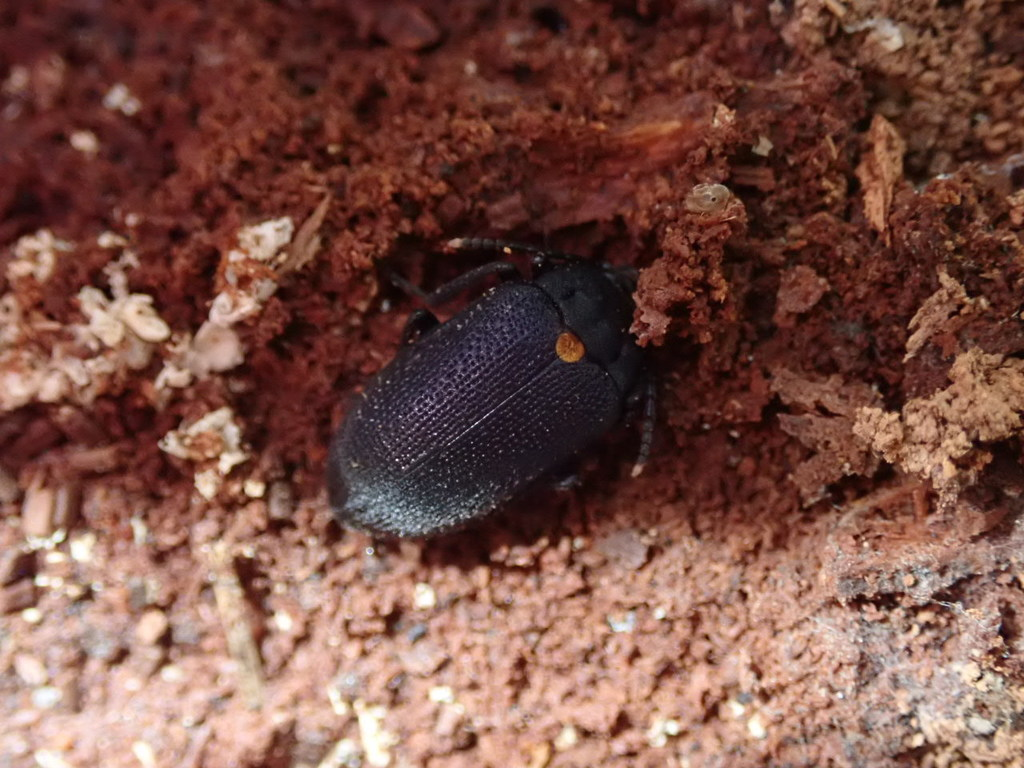
Penthe obliquata in soil or decaying wood

Penthe obliquata are found in North America, along the Eastern and Midwest regions of the United States and Canada. They range in size from 11–14 mm, and have a dark, rounded body but an orange scutellum. Penthe obliquata can be found under the loose bark of decaying and decomposing trees as well as in dry fungi. They inhabit a wide range of habitats, including mature hardwood forests, floodplain forests, swamps, pine forests. and other forested habitats. Known fungi hosts of this insect include Polyporus versicolor, Polyporus varius, Fomitopsis pinicola, and other fleshy and woody polypore fungi. Population levels of Penthe obliquata are thought to be secure, but large portions of the range do not have a status rank from NatureServe.
