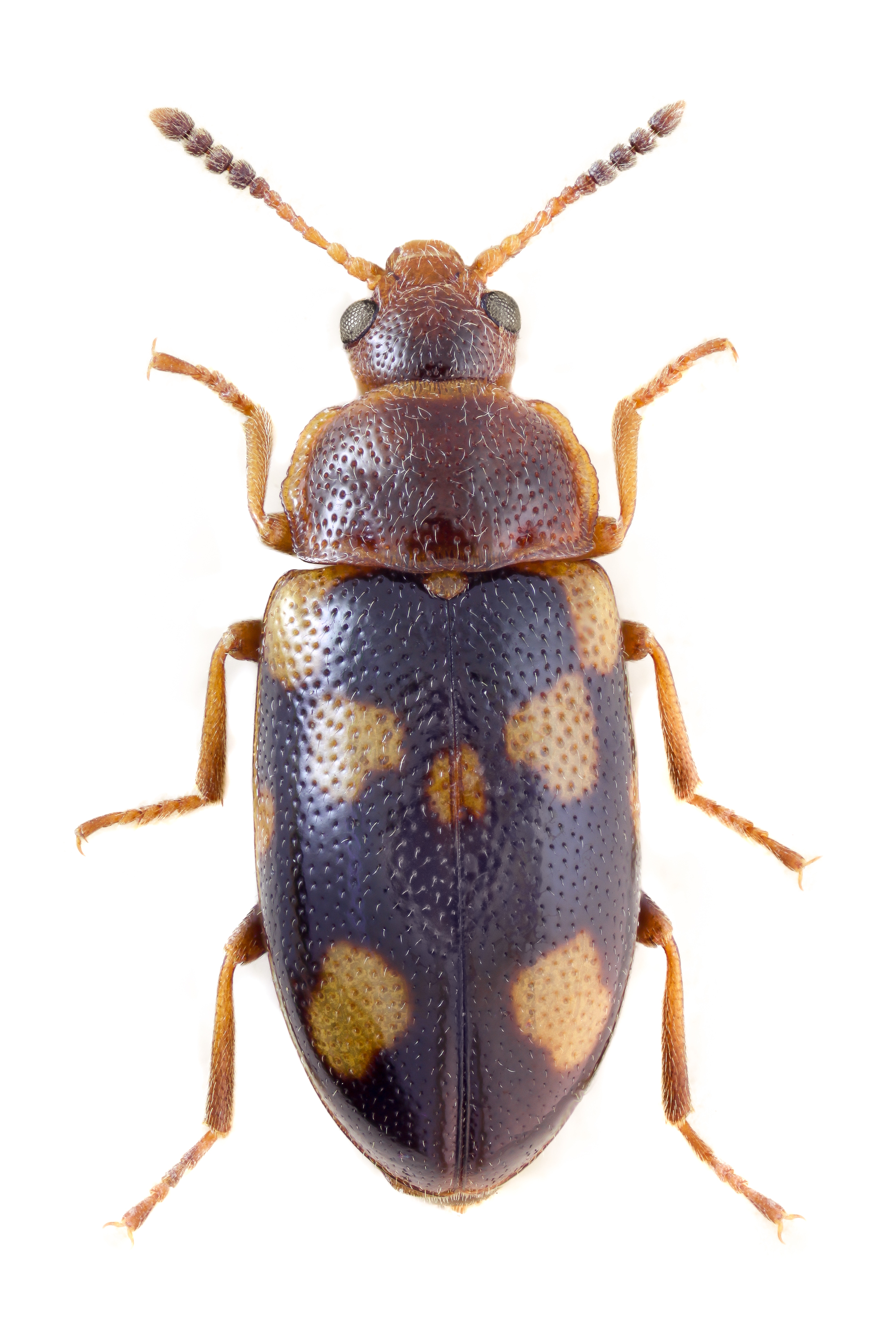

Scientific classification
- Kingdom: Animalia
- Phylum: Arthropoda
- Clade: Pancrustacea
- Class: Insecta
- Order: Coleoptera
- Suborder: Polyphaga
- Infraorder: Cucujiformia
- Family: Tetratomidae
- Genus: Tetratoma
- Species: T. ancora

Binomial name
- Tetratoma ancora Fabricius, 1790

= Tetratoma ancora =

Species of beetle

Tetratoma ancora is a species of beetle belonging to the family Tetratomidae.

It is native to Europe.
