= Tetratoma nikitskyi =

Scientific classification
- Domain: Eukaryota
- Kingdom: Animalia
- Phylum: Arthropoda
- Class: Insecta
- Order: Coleoptera
- Suborder: Polyphaga
- Infraorder: Cucujiformia
- Family: Tetratomidae
- Genus: Tetratoma
- Species: †T. nikitskyi

Binomial name
- †Tetratoma nikitskyi Alekseev, 2013

Extinct species of beetle

Tetratoma nikitskyi is a species of polypore fungus beetle found within the family Tetratomidae. Identified by Vitaly I. Alekseev, this species is the first of the Tetratomidae family to be located within the Baltic amber.
