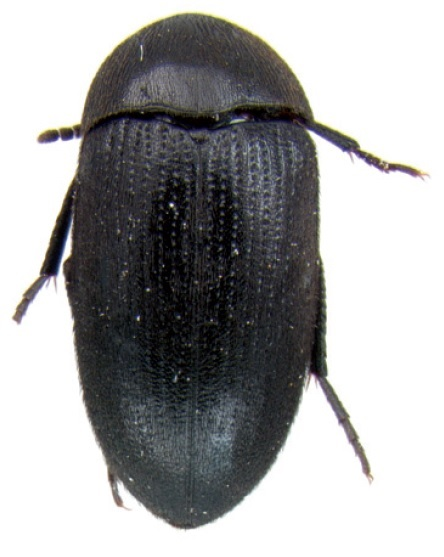

Scientific classification
- Domain: Eukaryota
- Kingdom: Animalia
- Phylum: Arthropoda
- Class: Insecta
- Order: Coleoptera
- Suborder: Polyphaga
- Infraorder: Cucujiformia
- Family: Tetratomidae
- Tribe: Eustrophini
- Genus: Eustrophopsis
- Species: E. confinis

Binomial name
- Eustrophopsis confinis (LeConte, 1866)

Synonyms
- Eustrophus confinis LeConte, 1866

= Eustrophopsis confinis =

Species of beetle

Eustrophopsis confinis is a species of polypore fungus beetle in the family Tetratomidae. It is found in North America.
