= Hallomenus punctulatus =

Scientific classification
- Kingdom: Animalia
- Phylum: Arthropoda
- Class: Insecta
- Order: Coleoptera
- Suborder: Polyphaga
- Infraorder: Cucujiformia
- Family: Tetratomidae
- Genus: Hallomenus
- Species: H. punctulatus

Binomial name
- Hallomenus punctulatus LeConte, 1866

Species of beetle

Hallomenus punctulatus is a species of polypore fungus beetle in the family Tetratomidae. It is found in North America.
