= Eustrophopsis arizonensis =

Scientific classification
- Domain: Eukaryota
- Kingdom: Animalia
- Phylum: Arthropoda
- Class: Insecta
- Order: Coleoptera
- Suborder: Polyphaga
- Infraorder: Cucujiformia
- Family: Tetratomidae
- Tribe: Eustrophini
- Genus: Eustrophopsis
- Species: E. arizonensis

Binomial name
- Eustrophopsis arizonensis (Horn, 1888)

Synonyms
- Eustrophus arizonensis Horn, 1888

Species of beetle

Eustrophopsis arizonensis is a species of polypore fungus beetle in the family Tetratomidae. It is found in Central America and North America.
