= Eustrophopsis brunneimarginatus =

Scientific classification
- Kingdom: Animalia
- Phylum: Arthropoda
- Clade: Pancrustacea
- Class: Insecta
- Order: Coleoptera
- Suborder: Polyphaga
- Infraorder: Cucujiformia
- Family: Tetratomidae
- Genus: Eustrophopsis
- Species: E. brunneimarginatus

Binomial name
- Eustrophopsis brunneimarginatus (Dury, 1906)

Synonyms
- Eustrophus brunneimarginatus Dury, 1906

Species of beetle

Eustrophopsis brunneimarginatus is a species of polypore fungus beetle in the family Tetratomidae. It is found in the eastern United States, west to east-central Texas.

== Description ==
Eustrophopsis brunneimarginatus measure 4.2–5.4 mm (0.17–0.21 in). This species' pronotum and elytra appear uniform in color with a piceous to black appearance with characteristic, contrasting rufous lateral margins. Individuals of this species may be distinguished from the subfamily Eustrophinae with the presence of lighter color marginal bands along the, contrasting, darker pronotum and elytra.

== Habitat ==
Eustrophopsis brunneimarginatus has been collected from various forested habitats, but also from beach wash-up.
