= Tetratoma concolor =

Scientific classification
- Kingdom: Animalia
- Phylum: Arthropoda
- Class: Insecta
- Order: Coleoptera
- Suborder: Polyphaga
- Infraorder: Cucujiformia
- Family: Tetratomidae
- Genus: Tetratoma
- Species: T. concolor

Binomial name
- Tetratoma concolor LeConte, 1879

Species of beetle

Tetratoma concolor is a species of polypore fungus beetle in the family Tetratomidae. It is found in North America.
