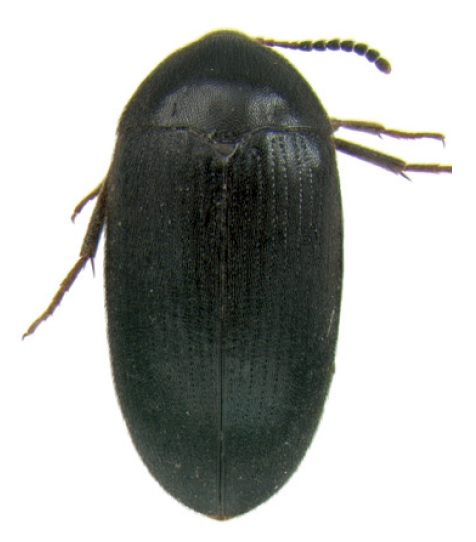

Scientific classification
- Domain: Eukaryota
- Kingdom: Animalia
- Phylum: Arthropoda
- Class: Insecta
- Order: Coleoptera
- Suborder: Polyphaga
- Infraorder: Cucujiformia
- Family: Tetratomidae
- Tribe: Eustrophini
- Genus: Synstrophus
- Species: S. repandus

Binomial name
- Synstrophus repandus (Horn, 1888)

Synonyms
- Eustrophus repandus Horn, 1888

= Synstrophus repandus =

Species of beetle

Synstrophus repandus is a species of polypore fungus beetle in the family Tetratomidae. It is found in North America.
