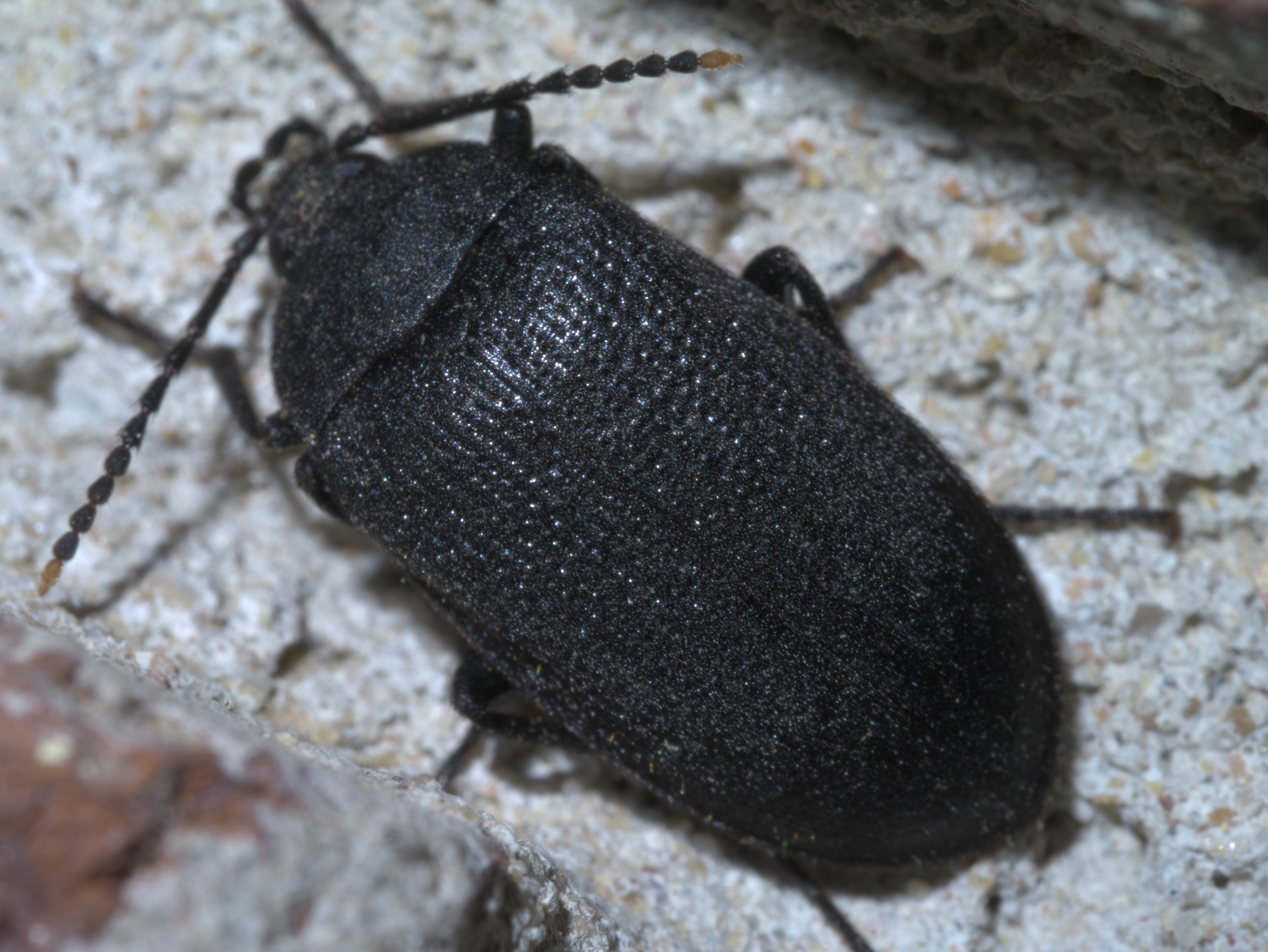

Scientific classification
- Domain: Eukaryota
- Kingdom: Animalia
- Phylum: Arthropoda
- Class: Insecta
- Order: Coleoptera
- Suborder: Polyphaga
- Infraorder: Cucujiformia
- Family: Tetratomidae
- Genus: Penthe
- Species: P. pimelia

Binomial name
- Penthe pimelia (Fabricius, 1801)

= Penthe pimelia =

Species of beetle

Penthe pimelia, the velvety bark beetle, is a species of polypore fungus beetle in the family Tetratomidae. It is found in North America.

This species has a uniformly dark appearance, including a dark scutellum, which distinguishes it from the only other species of Penthe in North America, Penthe obliqiuata, which exhibits a distinct, bright-orange scutellum.

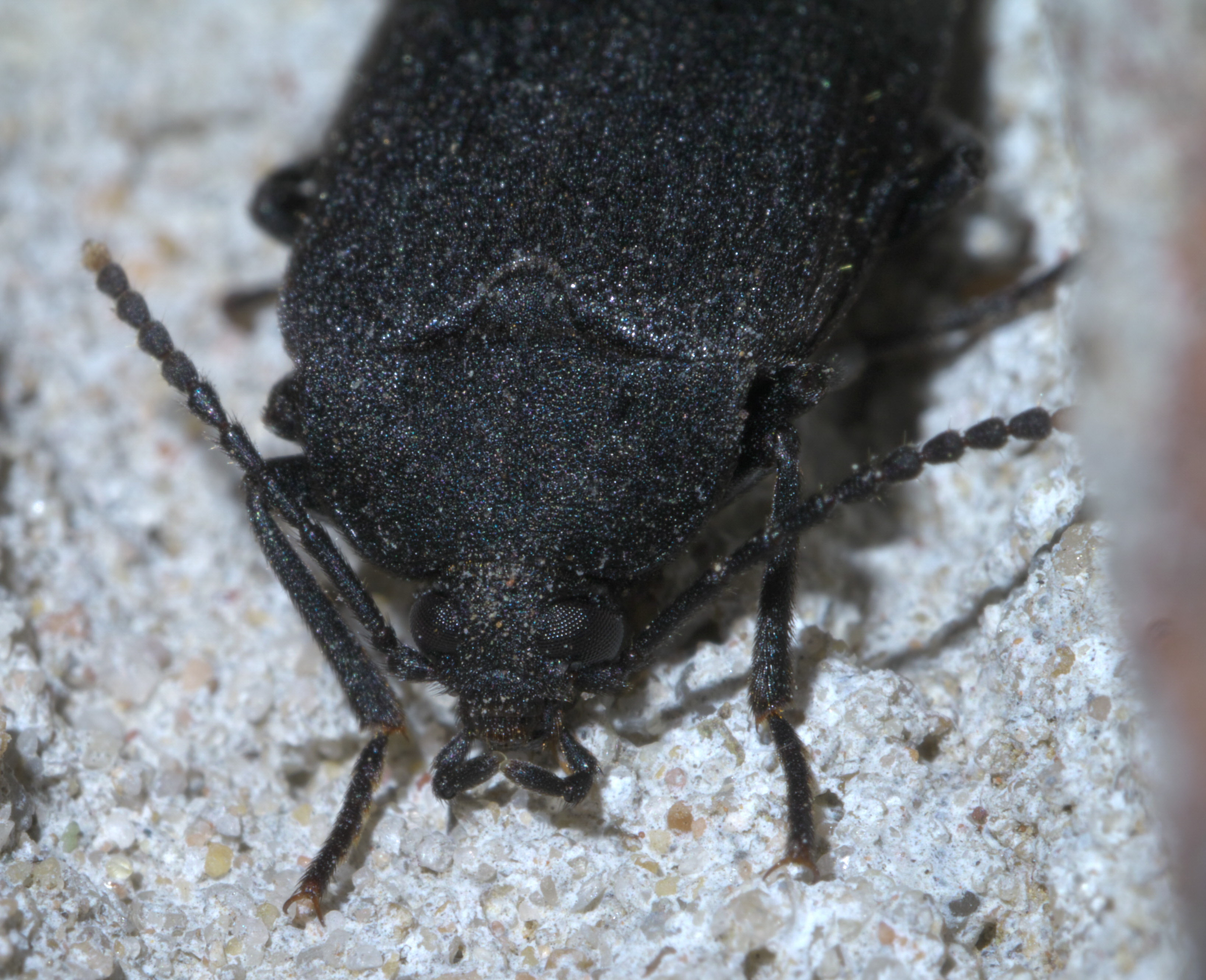
Velvety bark beetle, Penthe pimelia
