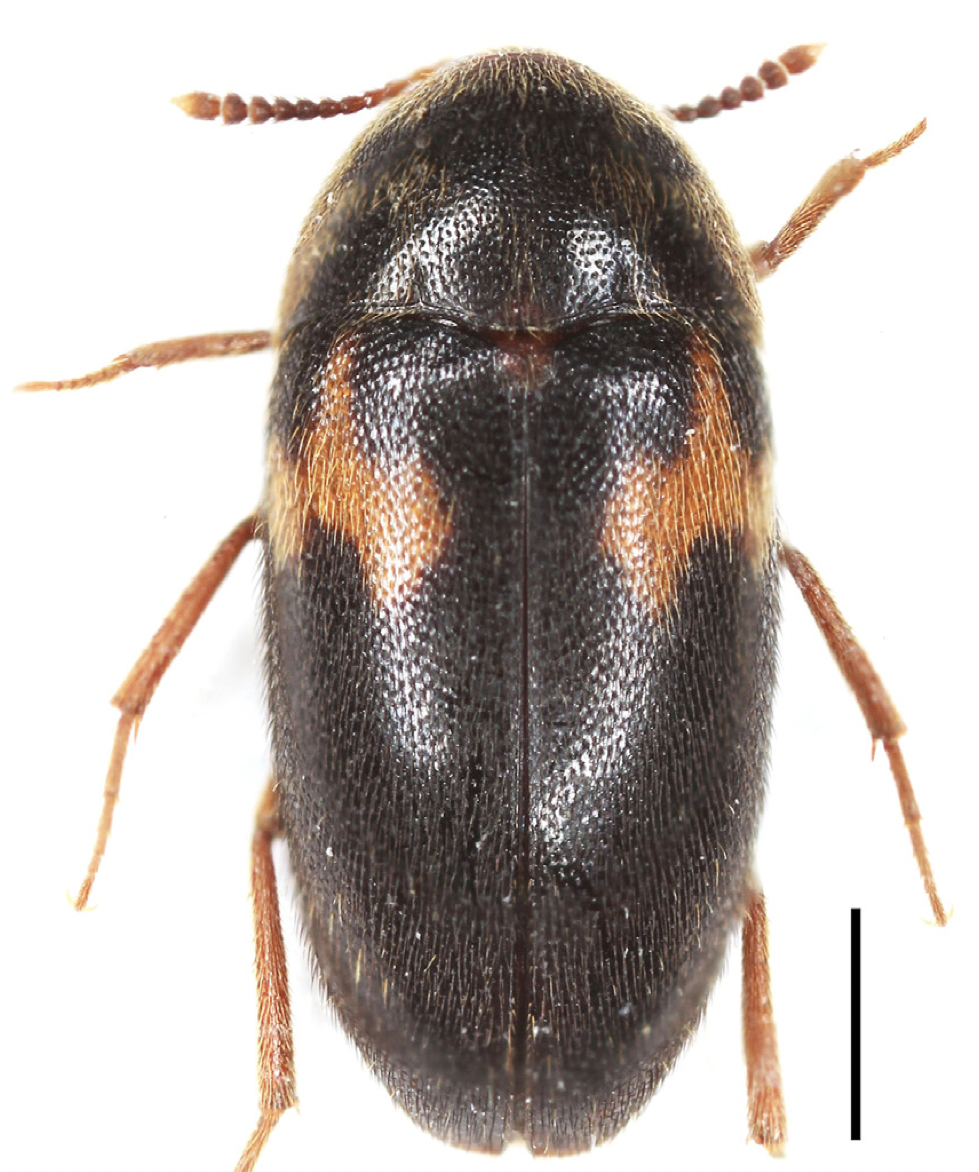

Scientific classification
- Domain: Eukaryota
- Kingdom: Animalia
- Phylum: Arthropoda
- Class: Insecta
- Order: Coleoptera
- Suborder: Polyphaga
- Infraorder: Cucujiformia
- Family: Tetratomidae
- Genus: Holostrophus
- Species: H. koreanus

Binomial name
- Holostrophus koreanus Jung & Seung, 2022

= Holostrophus koreanus =

Species of beetle

Holostrophus koreanus is a species of polypore fungus beetle in the family Tetratomidae. Being identified in 2022 by Boo Hee Jung and Jinbae Seung, Holostrophus koreanus was described as being found exclusively within the Gangwon province of Korea upon collecting specimens primarily from the fruiting bodies of Polyporales (Laetiporus sulphureus).

This species, broadly, contains an elliptical body with dispersed, short, whitish-yellow hairs and granular punctures. The head is described as being oval-shaped with dense, small punctures. The antennae is noted to be 11-segmented and weakly clavate, reaching to the basal pronotum. The pronotum appears semicircular dorsally. Moreover, the dorsal surface tends to be primarily brownish-black with the antennae, mouthparts, and legs being slightly yellowish-brown. The elytra is noted to be elongate and oval in shape. The elytron is described as exhibiting a black color with one, yellowish-brown, bidentate fascia band at basal 1/3 part. Furthermore, the ventral surface is noted to be completely yellowish-brown. The abdomen is noted to be covered in thin, brownish-white hairs.

In its identification, this species was described within a key to contain "elytron with one bidente fascia bands at subbasal parts, without marking at subapical part."

The species of Holostrophus koreanus is noted to be morphologically similar to Holostrophus diversefasciatus.
