= Pisenus humeralis =

Scientific classification
- Domain: Eukaryota
- Kingdom: Animalia
- Phylum: Arthropoda
- Class: Insecta
- Order: Coleoptera
- Suborder: Polyphaga
- Infraorder: Cucujiformia
- Family: Tetratomidae
- Genus: Pisenus
- Species: P. humeralis

Binomial name
- Pisenus humeralis (Kirby, 1837)

Synonyms
- Cryptophagus humeralis Kirby, 1837

Species of beetle

Pisenus humeralis is a species of polypore fungus beetle in the family Tetratomidae. It is found in North America.
