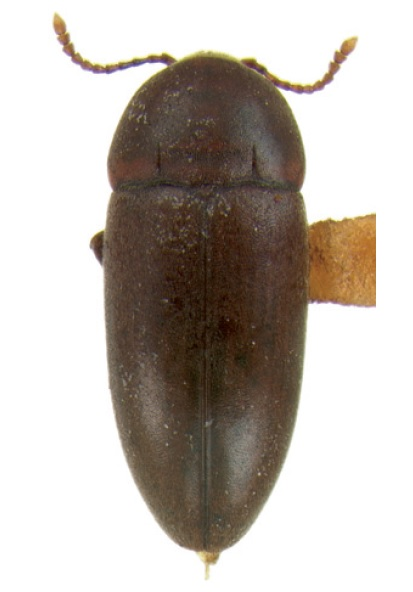

Scientific classification
- Kingdom: Animalia
- Phylum: Arthropoda
- Class: Insecta
- Order: Coleoptera
- Suborder: Polyphaga
- Infraorder: Cucujiformia
- Family: Tetratomidae
- Genus: Pseudoholostrophus
- Species: P. impressicollis

Binomial name
- Pseudoholostrophus impressicollis (LeConte, 1874)

Synonyms
- Eustrophus impressicollis LeConte, 1874

= Pseudoholostrophus impressicollis =

Species of beetle

Pseudoholostrophus impressicollis is a species of polypore fungus beetle in the family Tetratomidae. It is found in North America.
