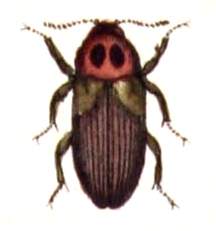

Scientific classification
- Kingdom: Animalia
- Phylum: Arthropoda
- Class: Insecta
- Order: Coleoptera
- Suborder: Polyphaga
- Infraorder: Cucujiformia
- Family: Tetratomidae
- Genus: Hallomenus
- Species: H. axillaris

Binomial name
- Hallomenus axillaris (Illiger, 1807)

= Hallomenus axillaris =

Species of beetle

Hallomenus axillaris is a species of fungus beetle in the family Tetratomidae, measuring 2.5–4.5 mm in length with a dark brown to black body often featuring lighter brownish-yellow areas at the shoulder region. The species develops within various polypore fungi in coniferous forests across the Palearctic region, from Scandinavia and western Russia through central Europe to France, with populations also in Siberia and parts of China. First described by Johann Karl Wilhelm Illiger in 1807, it is distinguished from related species by its smaller size, absence of dark spots on the pronotum, longer second antennomere, and fine punctation of the pronotum.

== Taxonomy ==
Hallomenus axillaris was originally described as Clerus axillaris by Johann Karl Wilhelm Illiger in 1807 and later reassigned to the nominate genus Hallomenus. It belongs to the subgenus Hallomenus within Tetratomidae. This species is distinguished from its close relative H. binotatus by its smaller size (2.5–4.5 mm versus 3.5–6 mm in H. binotatus), absence of dark spots on the pronotum, a proportionally longer second antennomere, and fine, non‑granular punctation of the pronotum.

== Description ==
Adults are 2.5–4.5 mm long, with an elongated, slightly flattened body. The pronotum (the shield‑like plate immediately behind the head) and elytra (hardened forewings) are typically dark brown to black, often with lighter brownish‑yellow (testaceous) areas at the humeral (shoulder) region. A pale, nearly uniformly testaceous form has also been recorded. The elytra bear distinct longitudinal grooves (striae), and the second antennal segment is noticeably longer than the first, features that aid identification in the field.

== Habitat and distribution ==
Hallomenus axillaris occurs in montane coniferous forests, where it develops in the fruiting bodies of a variety of polypore fungi (for example, Postia, Tyromyces, Fomitopsis and Laetiporus), making it polyphagous on fungal hosts. Its Palearctic range extends from Scandinavia, the Baltic region and western Russia through central Europe to France, as well as into Siberia and parts of China. Southern populations are scarce, and until 2015 the species had not been confirmed in the Iberian Peninsula. The first Iberian record comes from interception‑flight trap captures at roughly 1,400 m in a Scots pine (Pinus sylvestris) stand on the southern slopes of the Pyrenees in Navarre, Spain. In the Moscow region, it has been recorded growing in the fruitbodies of several fungi: Hapalopilus rutilans, Laetiporus sulphureus, Cerioporus squamosus, Postia fragilis, Pycnoporellus fulgens, Tyromyces chioneus, and Fomes fomentarius.
