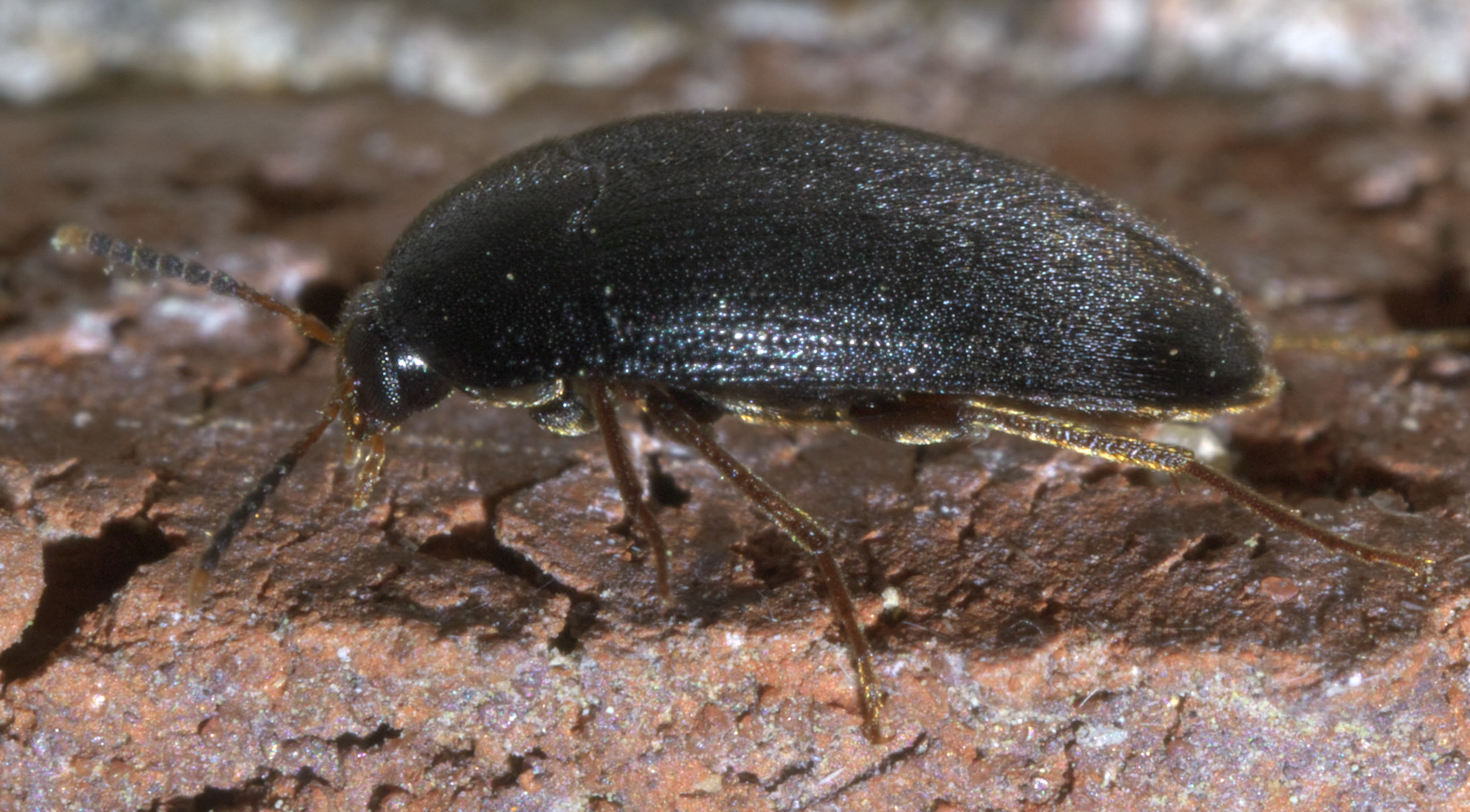

Scientific classification
- Kingdom: Animalia
- Phylum: Arthropoda
- Clade: Pancrustacea
- Class: Insecta
- Order: Coleoptera
- Suborder: Polyphaga
- Infraorder: Cucujiformia
- Family: Tetratomidae
- Genus: Eustrophopsis
- Species: E. bicolor

Binomial name
- Eustrophopsis bicolor (Fabricius, 1798)

Synonyms
- Mycetophagus bicolor Fabricius, 1798

= Eustrophopsis bicolor =

Species of beetle

Eustrophopsis bicolor is a species of polypore fungus beetle in the family Tetratomidae. It is found in the Caribbean Sea and North America.

This species can be identified from the genus Eustrophopsis through the presence of characteristically contrasting antennomeres where antennomeres 1 through 4 appear rufous, 5 through 10 appear dark piceous to black, and 11 appears yellowish-orange.

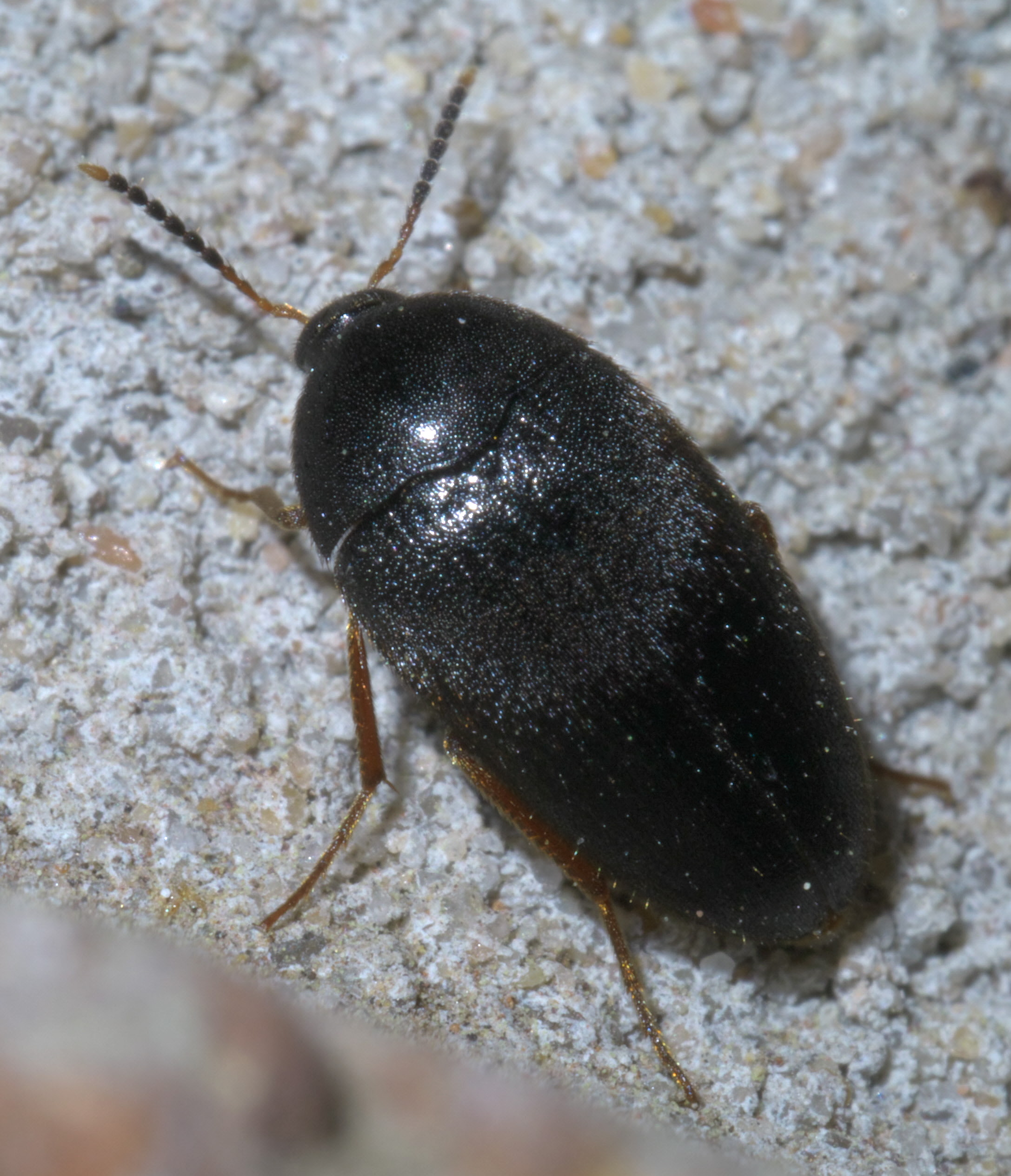
