= Tetratoma yunnanensis =

Scientific classification
- Kingdom: Animalia
- Phylum: Arthropoda
- Class: Insecta
- Order: Coleoptera
- Suborder: Polyphaga
- Infraorder: Cucujiformia
- Family: Tetratomidae
- Genus: Tetratoma
- Species: T. yunnanensis

Binomial name
- Tetratoma yunnanensis Nikitsky, 2016

Species of polypore fungus

Tetratoma yunnanensis is a species of polypore fungus beetle found within the family Tetratomidae. Being identified in 2016 by Bolshaya Nikitskaya, Tetratoma yunnanensis was described from the Chinese providence of Yunnan in Southern China.

Closely related to Tetratoma nobuchii from Japan, this species exhibits a uniquely shiny, metallic elytra compared to the blackish-blue metallic tint seen within T. nobuchii. Additionally, still comparing these two species, T. yunnanensis exhibits a shorter antennal club which, slightly, exceeds the lengths of its preceding antennomeres combined. Overall, the bronze-greenish, or completely bronze coloration, of the elytra distinguishes T. yunnanensis from other species within Tetratoma.
