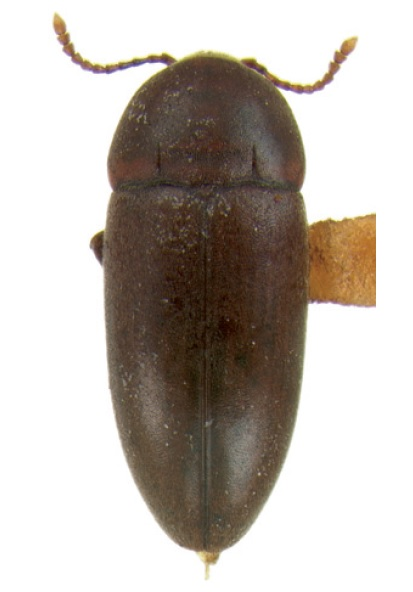
- Pseudoholostrophus impressicollis

Scientific classification
- Domain: Eukaryota
- Kingdom: Animalia
- Phylum: Arthropoda
- Class: Insecta
- Order: Coleoptera
- Suborder: Polyphaga
- Infraorder: Cucujiformia
- Family: Tetratomidae
- Subfamily: Eustrophinae
- Tribe: Holostrophini
- Genus: Pseudoholostrophus; Nikitsky, 1983

= Pseudoholostrophus =

Genus of beetles

Pseudoholostrophus is a genus of polypore fungus beetles in the family Tetratomidae. There are at least four described species in Pseudoholostrophus. Two of these described species are Nearctic.

Pseudoholostrophus is distinct from Holostrophus due to the presence of its smaller, more weakly emarginate eyes and the prosternal process not extending behind the posterior edge of the procoxae.

== Species ==
These two species belong to the genus Pseudoholostrophus:

- Pseudoholostrophus discolor (Horn, 1888)
- Pseudoholostrophus impressicollis (LeConte, 1874)
