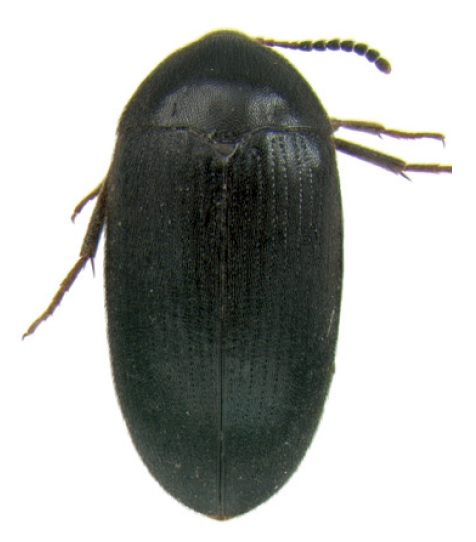
- Synstrophus repandus

Scientific classification
- Kingdom: Animalia
- Phylum: Arthropoda
- Clade: Pancrustacea
- Class: Insecta
- Order: Coleoptera
- Suborder: Polyphaga
- Infraorder: Cucujiformia
- Family: Tetratomidae
- Subfamily: Eustrophinae
- Tribe: Eustrophini
- Genus: Synstrophus; Seidlitz, 1898

= Synstrophus =

Genus of beetles

Synstrophus is a genus of polypore fungus beetles in the family Tetratomidae. There are at least two described species in Synstrophus.

== Species ==
These species belong to the genus Synstrophus:

- Synstrophus klapperichi Pic, 1955
- Synstrophus macrophthalmus Reitter, 1887
- Synstrophus repandus (Horn, 1888)
- Synstrophus rollei Pic, 1910
