= Pisenus =

Scientific classification
- Kingdom: Animalia
- Phylum: Arthropoda
- Class: Insecta
- Order: Coleoptera
- Suborder: Polyphaga
- Infraorder: Cucujiformia
- Family: Tetratomidae
- Subfamily: Piseninae
- Genus: Pisenus; Casey, 1900

Genus of beetles

Pisenus is a genus of polypore fungus beetles in the family Tetratomidae. There are at least four described species in Pisenus.

== Species ==
These four species belong to the genus Pisenus:

- Pisenus chujoi Miyatake, 1960
- Pisenus formosanus Miyatake, 1974
- Pisenus humeralis (Kirby, 1837)
- Pisenus pubescens Casey, 1900
