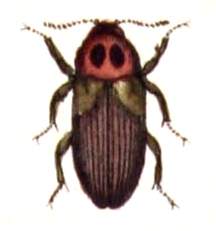
- Hallomenus axillaris

Scientific classification
- Domain: Eukaryota
- Kingdom: Animalia
- Phylum: Arthropoda
- Class: Insecta
- Order: Coleoptera
- Suborder: Polyphaga
- Infraorder: Cucujiformia
- Family: Tetratomidae
- Genus: Hallomenus; Panzer, 1794

= Hallomenus =

Genus of beetles

Hallomenus is a genus of polypore fungus beetles in the family Tetratomidae. There are about nine described species in Hallomenus.

== Species ==
These nine species belong to the genus Hallomenus:

- Hallomenus arimotoi Toyoshima & Ishikawa, 2000
- Hallomenus axillaris (Illiger, 1807)
- Hallomenus binotatus (Quensel, 1790)
- Hallomenus debilis LeConte, 1866
- Hallomenus pallens Gyllenhal, 1817
- Hallomenus punctulatus LeConte, 1866
- Hallomenus reticulatus Motschulsky, 1872
- Hallomenus scapularis Melsheimer, 1846
- Hallomenus serricornis LeConte, 1878
