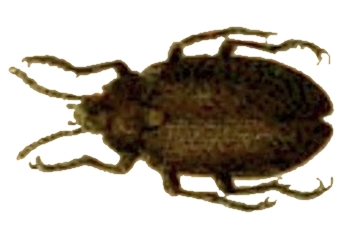
- Penthe obliquata

Scientific classification
- Domain: Eukaryota
- Kingdom: Animalia
- Phylum: Arthropoda
- Class: Insecta
- Order: Coleoptera
- Suborder: Polyphaga
- Infraorder: Cucujiformia
- Family: Tetratomidae
- Genus: Penthe; Newman, 1838

= Penthe =

Genus of beetles

Penthe is a genus of polypore fungus beetles in the family Tetratomidae. There are at least three described species in Penthe. Holarctic and Oriental. They live under bark in woody areas.

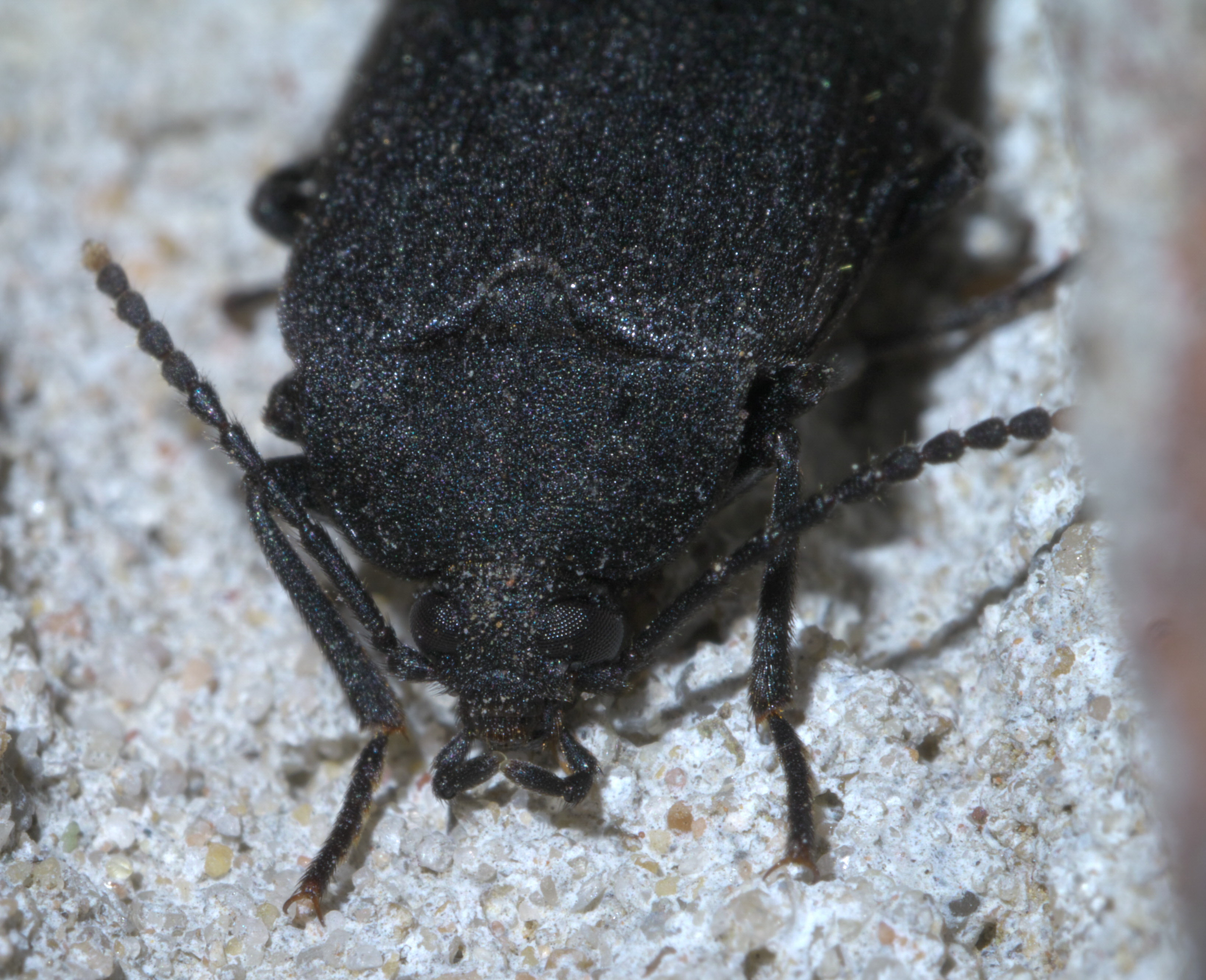
Penthe pimelia

== Species ==
These species belong to the genus Penthe:

- Penthe almorensis
- Penthe brevicollis
- Penthe japana
- Penthe javana
- Penthe obliquata (Fabricius, 1801)
- Penthe pimelia (Fabricius, 1801) (velvety bark beetle)
- Penthe reitteri Nikitsky, 1998
- Penthe rufopubens
- Penthe similis
