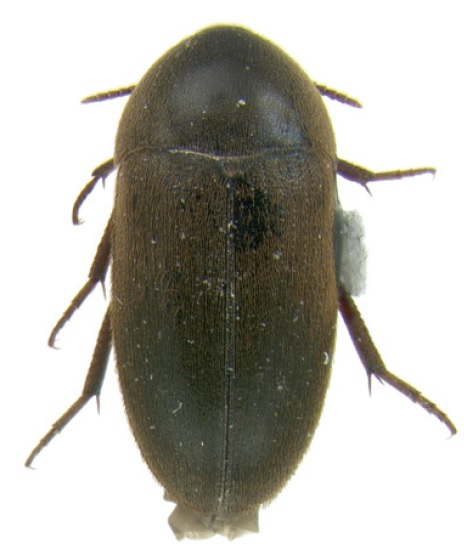
- Eustrophus tomentosus

Scientific classification
- Kingdom: Animalia
- Phylum: Arthropoda
- Clade: Pancrustacea
- Class: Insecta
- Order: Coleoptera
- Suborder: Polyphaga
- Infraorder: Cucujiformia
- Family: Tetratomidae
- Subfamily: Eustrophinae
- Tribe: Eustrophini
- Genus: Eustrophus; Illiger, 1807

= Eustrophus =

Genus of beetles

Eustrophus is a genus of polypore fungus beetles in the family Tetratomidae. There are at least two described species in Eustrophus.

== Species ==
For living species belong to the genus Eustrophus:

- Eustrophus dermestoides (Fabricius, 1792)
- Eustrophus niponicus Lewis, 1895
- Eustrophus tomentosus Say, 1827
- Eustrophus yunnanensis Nikitsky, 1998

†Eustrophus praecursor Alekseev & Bukejs, 2022
