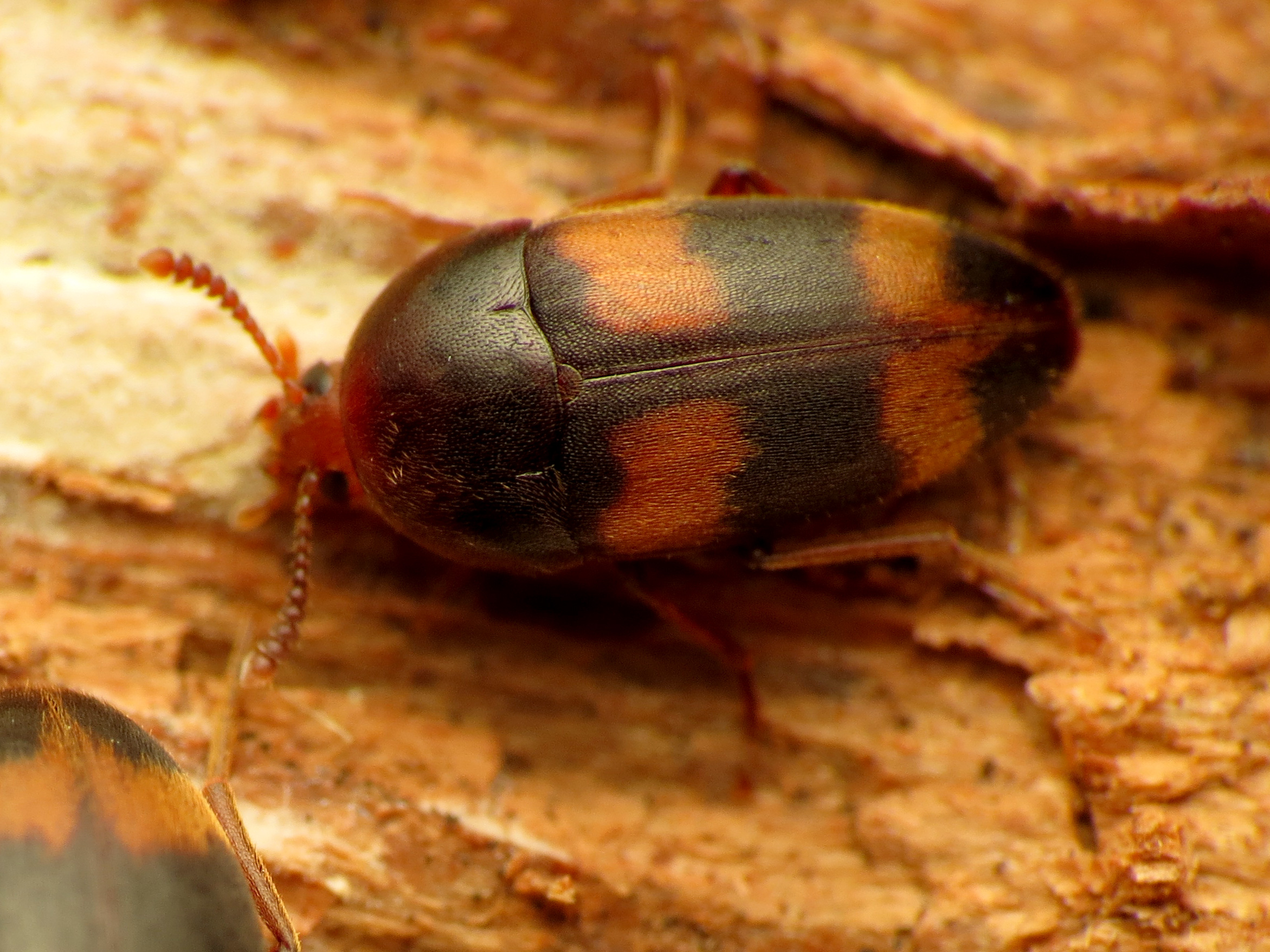
- Holostrophus bifasciatus

Scientific classification
- Domain: Eukaryota
- Kingdom: Animalia
- Phylum: Arthropoda
- Class: Insecta
- Order: Coleoptera
- Suborder: Polyphaga
- Infraorder: Cucujiformia
- Family: Tetratomidae
- Subfamily: Eustrophinae
- Tribe: Holostrophini
- Genus: Holostrophus; Horn, 1888

= Holostrophus =

Genus of beetles

Holostrophus is a genus of polypore fungus beetles in the family Tetratomidae. There are seventeen described species in Holostrophus.

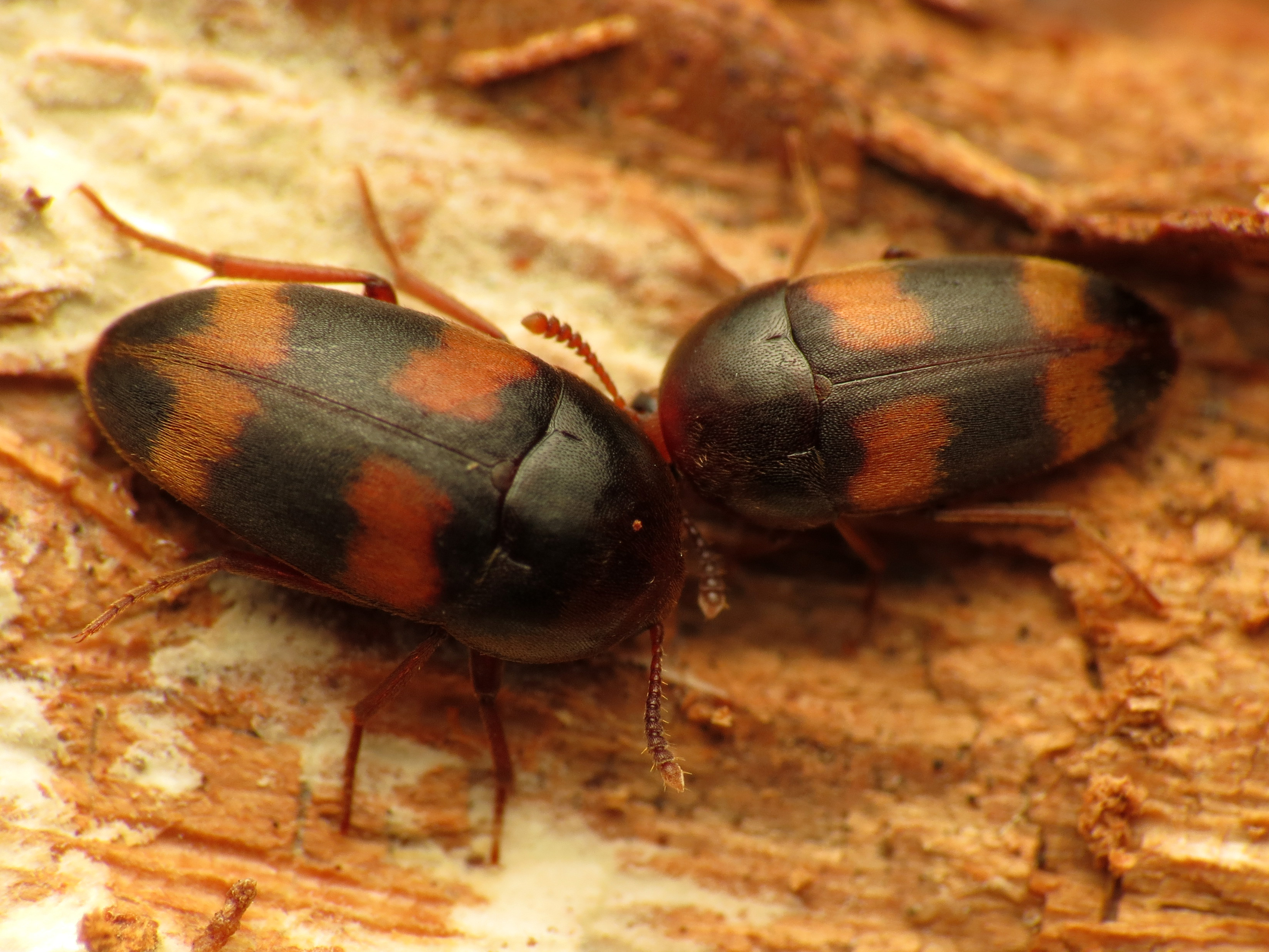
Holostrophus bifasciatus

== Species ==
These five species belong to the genus Holostrophus:

- Holostrophus bifasciatus Say, 1824
- Holostrophus diversefasciatus
- Holostrophus orientalis Lewis, 1895
- Holostrophus koreanus Jung & Seung, 2022
- Holostrophus toyoshimai
