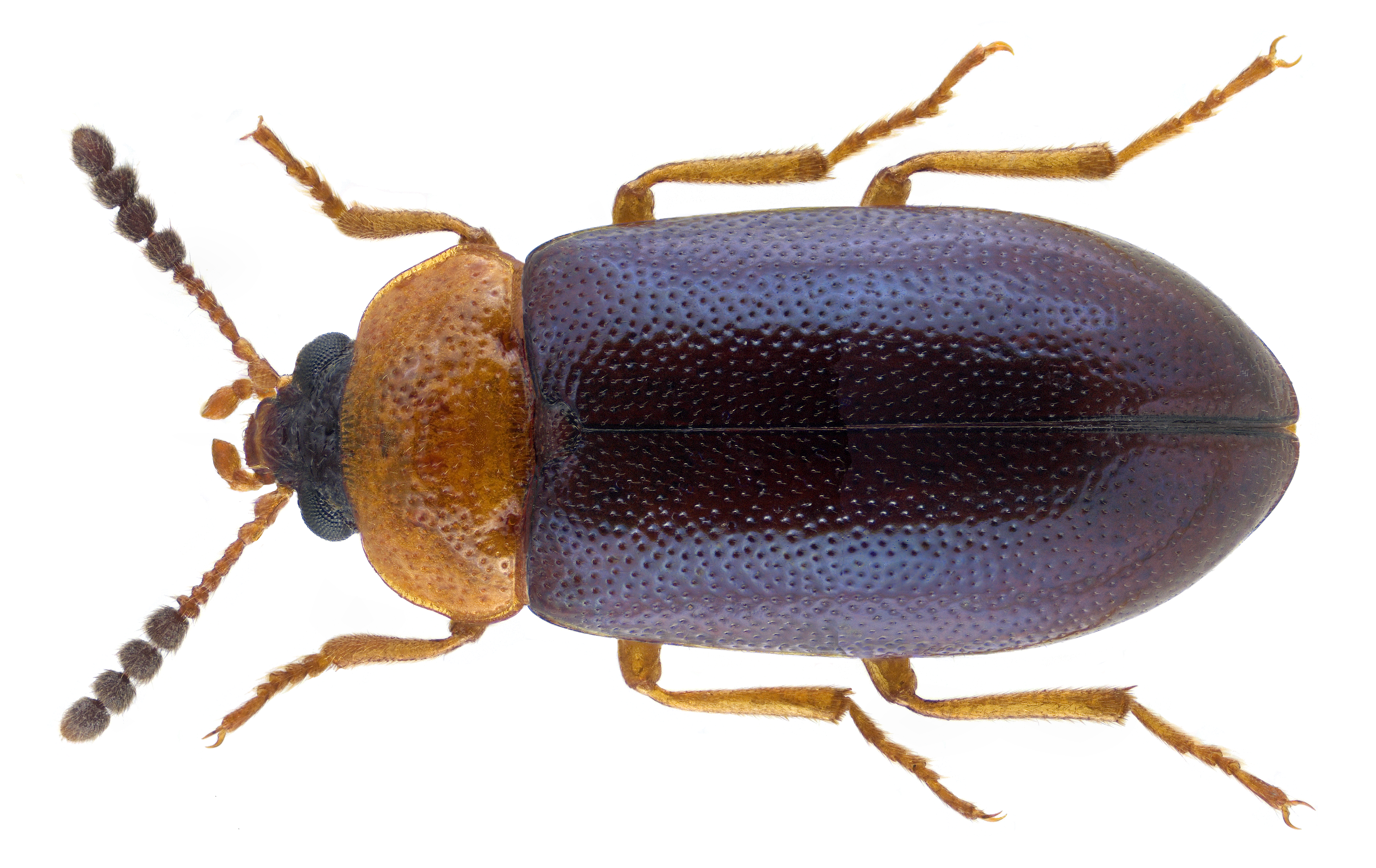
- Tetratoma fungorum

Scientific classification
- Domain: Eukaryota
- Kingdom: Animalia
- Phylum: Arthropoda
- Class: Insecta
- Order: Coleoptera
- Suborder: Polyphaga
- Infraorder: Cucujiformia
- Family: Tetratomidae
- Genus: Tetratoma; Fabricius, 1790

Subgenera
- Tetratoma (Abstrulia) Casey, 1900; Tetratoma (Falsoxanthalia) Pic, 1934; Tetratoma (Incolia) Casey, 1900; Tetratoma (Paratetratoma) Nikitsky, 1998; Tetratoma (Tetratoma) Fabricius, 1790

= Tetratoma =

Genus of beetles

Tetratoma is a genus of polypore fungus beetles in the family Tetratomidae. There are about 25 described species in Tetratoma.

== Species ==
- Tetratoma ainu (Nakane, 1963)
- Tetratoma ancora Fabricius, 1790
- Tetratoma baudueri Perris, 1864
- Tetratoma bicoloripes (Pic, 1934)
- Tetratoma canadensis Nikitsky, 2004
- Tetratoma concolor LeConte, 1879
- Tetratoma crenicollis Baudi, 1877
- Tetratoma cyanoptera Champion, 1924
- Tetratoma desmarestii Latreille, 1807
- Tetratoma fungorum Fabricius, 1790
- Tetratoma fuscoguttata Nikitsky, 1998
- Tetratoma japonica Miyatake, 1955
- Tetratoma longipennis (Casey, 1900)
- Tetratoma nepalensis Nikitsky, 1998
- Tetratoma nobuchii Nakane, 1955
- Tetratoma pictipennis Reitter, 1896
- Tetratoma sakagutii Nakane, 1955
- Tetratoma talyshensis Nikitsky, 1989
- Tetratoma tedaldi Reitter, 1887
- Tetratoma tessellata Melsheimer, 1844
- Tetratoma truncorum LeConte, 1866
- Tetratoma variegata (Casey, 1900)
- Tetratoma virgo Motschulsky 1845
- Tetratoma wittmeri Nikitsky, 1998
- Tetratoma yunnanensis Nikitsky, 2016
- †Tetratoma nikitskyi Alekseev, 2013
