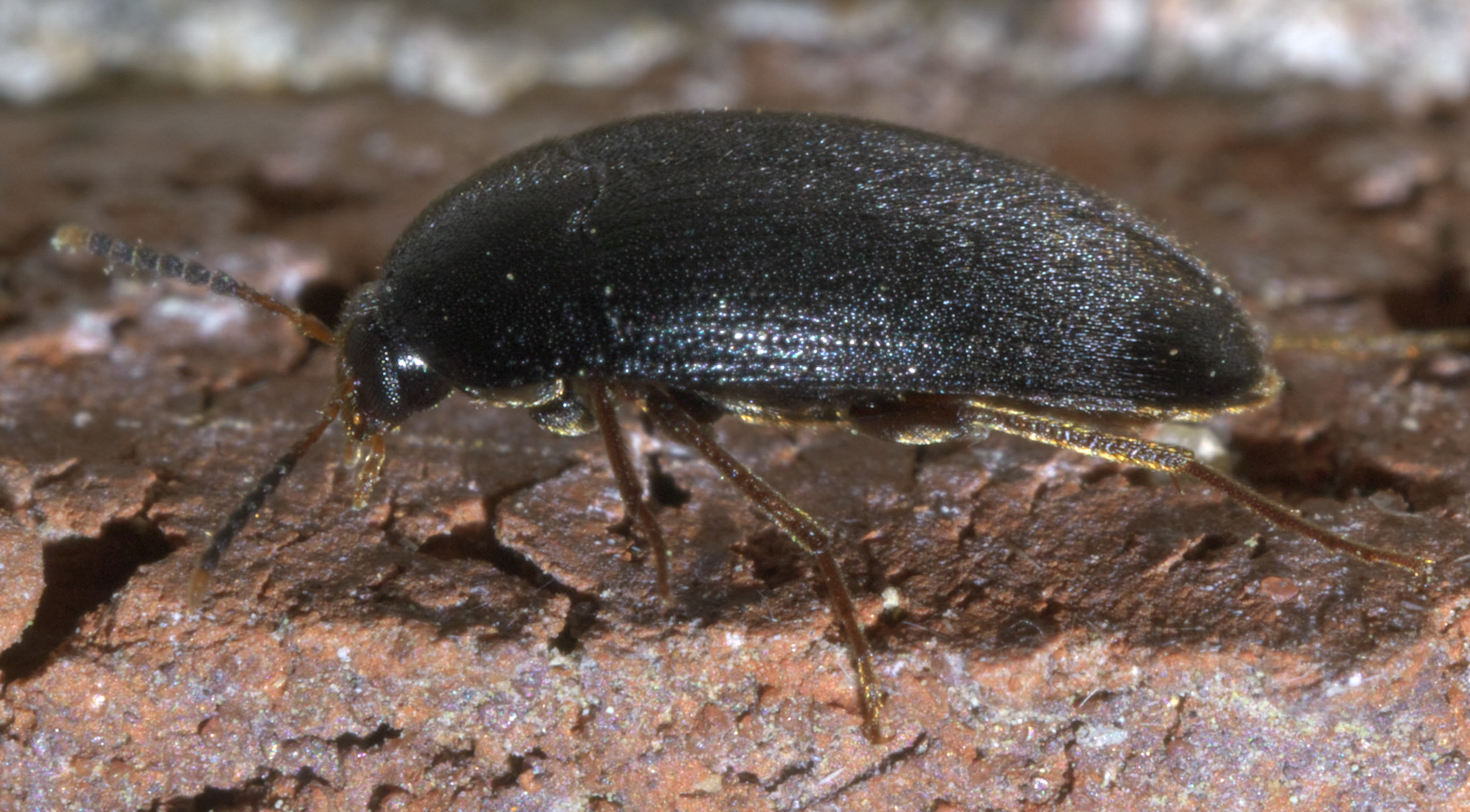
- Eustrophopsis bicolor

Scientific classification
- Kingdom: Animalia
- Phylum: Arthropoda
- Clade: Pancrustacea
- Class: Insecta
- Order: Coleoptera
- Suborder: Polyphaga
- Infraorder: Cucujiformia
- Family: Tetratomidae
- Subfamily: Eustrophinae
- Tribe: Eustrophini
- Genus: Eustrophopsis; Champion, 1889

Synonyms
- Eustrophinus Seidlitz, 1898

= Eustrophopsis =

Genus of beetles

Eustrophopsis is a genus of polypore fungus beetles in the family Tetratomidae. There are several described species in Eustrophopsis.

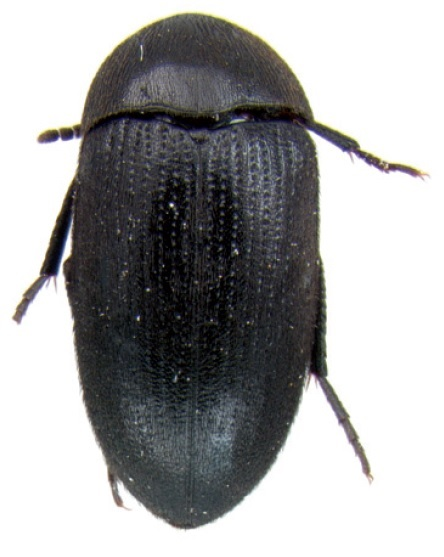
Eustrophopsis confinis

== Species ==
These species belong to the genus Eustrophopsis:

- Eustrophopsis arizonensis (Horn, 1888)
- Eustrophopsis bicolor (Fabricius, 1798)
- Eustrophopsis bipunctatus Champion, 1889
- Eustrophopsis bombinus (Seidlitz1898)
- Eustrophopsis brunneimarginata (Dury, 1906)
- Eustrophopsis confinis (LeConte, 1866)
- Eustrophopsis crowdyi Pollock, 2012
- Eustrophopsis indistincta (LeConte, 1851)
- Eustrophopsis ornata (VanDyke, 1928)
- Eustrophopsis rotundata Champion, 1889

etc
