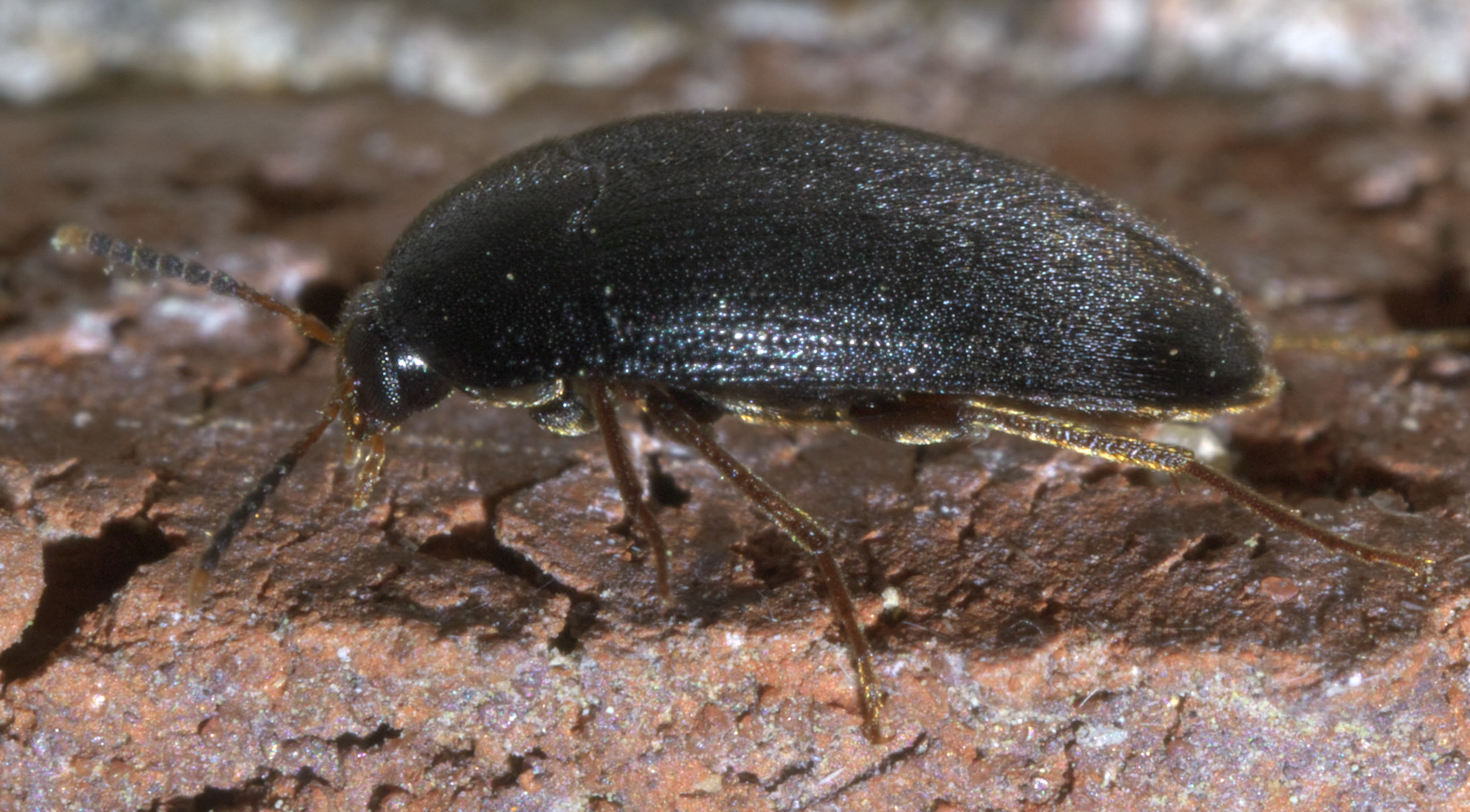
- Eustrophopsis bicolor

Scientific classification
- Kingdom: Animalia
- Phylum: Arthropoda
- Clade: Pancrustacea
- Class: Insecta
- Order: Coleoptera
- Suborder: Polyphaga
- Infraorder: Cucujiformia
- Superfamily: Tenebrionoidea
- Family: Tetratomidae; Billberg, 1820

= Tetratomidae =

Tetratomidae Temporal range: Cenomanian–Recent

Family of beetles

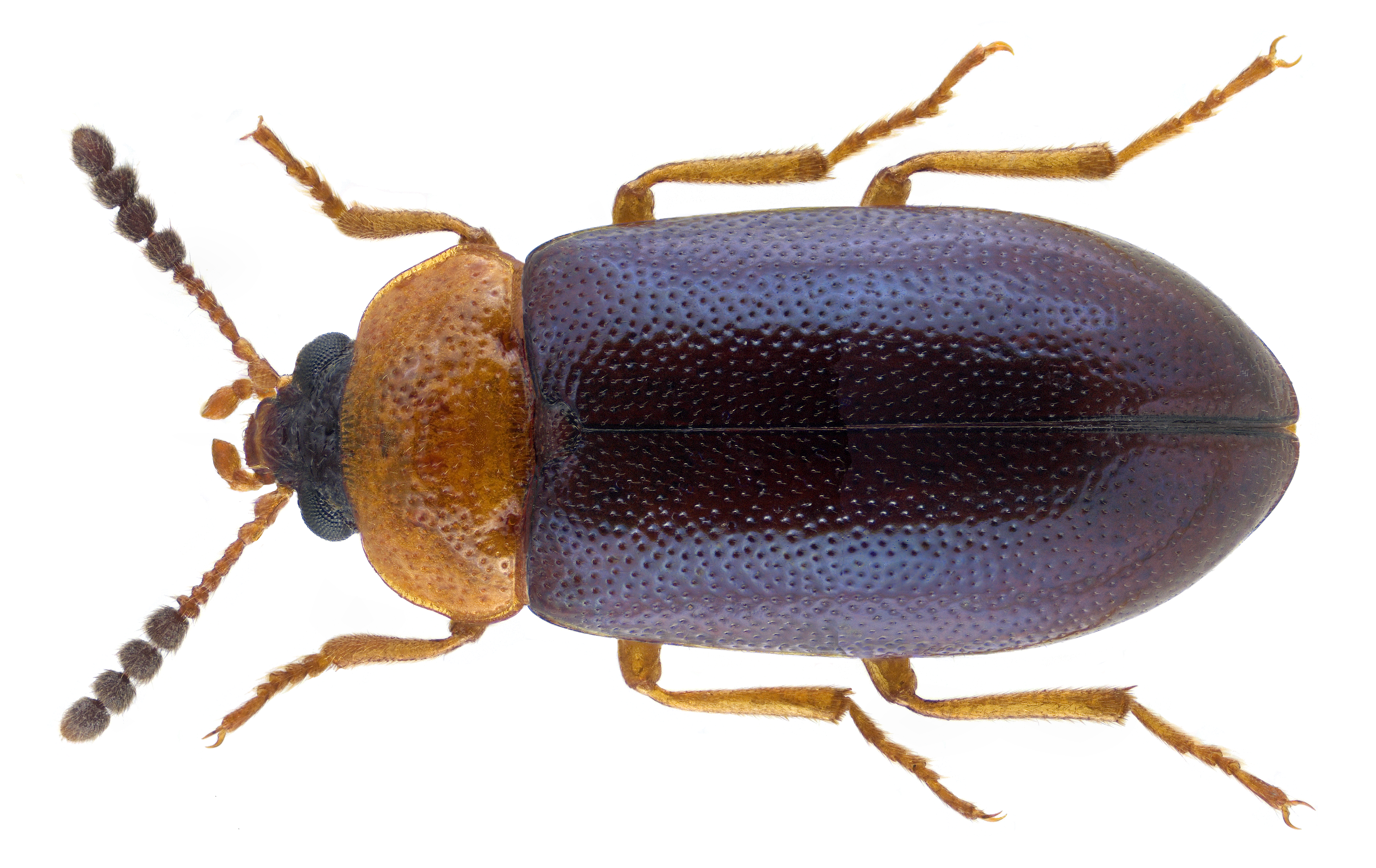
Tetratoma

Tetratomidae is a small family of beetles sometimes called polypore fungus beetles. The family consists of several genera, most of which used to be in the family Melandryidae. Tetratomidae can be found worldwide.

Their food consists of fruiting bodies of hymenomycete fungi.

== Genera ==
These 12 genera belong to the family Tetratomidae:

- Cyanopenthe Nikitsky, 1998
- Eustrophopsis Champion, 1889
- Eustrophus Illiger, 1807
- Hallomenus Panzer, 1794
- Holostrophus Horn, 1888
- Mycetoma Dejean, 1834
- Penthe Newman, 1838
- Pisenus Casey, 1900
- Pseudoholostrophus Nikitsky, 1983
- Synstrophus Seidlitz, 1898
- Tetratoma Fabricius, 1790
- Triphyllia Reitter, 1898

=== Fossil genera ===
- Subfamily Eustrophinae
  - Tribe Eustrophini
    - †Allostrophus Hsiao et al., 2018 (Cenomanian Burmese amber, Myanmar)
    - †Thescelostrophus Yu et al., 2016 (Burmese amber)
  - Tribe Holostrophini
    - †Synchrotronia Soriano & Pollock, 2014 (Cenomanian Charentese amber, France)
  - Tribe incertae sedis
    - †Cretosynstrophus Cai et al., 2016 (Burmese amber)
- Subfamily Hallomeninae
  - †Pseudohallomenus Nikitsky, 1977 (Santonian, Taimyr amber, Russia)
