= List of unproven and disproven cancer treatments =

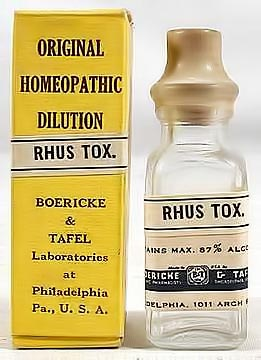
Homeopathic remedies; ineffective for treating cancer

This is a non-exhaustive list of alternative treatments that have been promoted to treat or prevent cancer in humans but which lack scientific and medical evidence of effectiveness. In many cases, there is scientific evidence that the alleged treatments are not effective, and in some cases, may even be harmful. Unlike accepted cancer treatments, treatments lacking in evidence of efficacy are generally ignored or avoided by the medical community and are often pseudoscientific. Many alternative cancer treatments are considered disproven because they have been investigated with clinical trials and have been shown to be ineffective.

== Alternative health systems ==
- Aromatherapy – the use of fragrant substances, such as essential oils, in the belief that smelling them will positively affect health. There is some evidence that aromatherapy improves general well-being, but it has also been promoted for its ability to fight diseases, including cancer. The American Cancer Society states "available scientific evidence does not support claims that aromatherapy is effective in preventing or treating cancer".
- Ayurvedic medicine – a 2,200-year-old system of traditional medicine which originated on the Indian subcontinent. According to Cancer Research UK, "There is no scientific evidence to prove that Ayurvedic medicine can treat or cure cancer."
- Germanic New Medicine – a popular medical system devised by Ryke Geerd Hamer (1935–2017), in which all disease is seen as deriving from emotional shock and mainstream medicine is regarded as a conspiracy promulgated by Jews. There is no evidence to support its claims and no biological reason why it should work.
- Greek cancer cure – A putative cancer cure invented and promoted by microbiologist Hariton-Tzannis Alivizatos. It consisted of intravenous injections of a fluid for which Aliviatos would not reveal the formula. The American Cancer Society concluded that "there is no evidence that any aspect of the diagnostic test nor the treatment [...] [is] effective in the treatment of cancer." In addition they state "Nor is there any evidence that.. the intravenous injections are safe."
- Herbalism – a whole-body approach to promoting health, in which substances are derived from entire plants so as not to disturb what herbalists believe is the delicate chemistry of the plant as a whole. According to Cancer Research UK, "there is currently no strong evidence from studies in people that herbal remedies can treat, prevent or cure cancer".
- Holistic medicine – a general term for an approach to medicine which encompasses mental and spiritual aspects, and which is manifested in sundry complementary and alternative methods. According to the American Cancer Society, "available scientific evidence does not support claims that these complementary and alternative methods, when used without mainstream or conventional medicine, are effective in treating cancer or any other disease".
- Homeopathy – a pseudoscientific system of medicine based on ultra-diluted substances. Some proponents promote homeopathy as a cancer cure; however, according to the American Cancer Society "there is no reliable evidence showing that homeopathic remedies can treat cancer in humans".
- Native American healing – shamanistic forms of medicine traditionally practiced by some indigenous American peoples and which have been claimed as being capable of curing human diseases, including cancer. The American Cancer Society say that while its supportive, community aspects might improve general well-being, "available scientific evidence does not support claims that Native American healing can cure cancer or any other disease".
- Naturopathy – a system of alternative medicine based on a belief in energy forces in the body and an avoidance of conventional medicine; it is promoted as a treatment for cancer and other ailments. According to the American Cancer Society, "scientific evidence does not support claims that naturopathic medicine can cure cancer or any other disease".

== Diet-based ==
- Alkaline diet – a restrictive diet of non-acid foods, such as that proposed by Edgar Cayce (1877–1945), based on the claim this will affect the pH of the body generally, so reducing the risk of heart disease and cancer. According to the Canadian Cancer Society, "there is no evidence to support any of these claims."
- Breuss diet – a diet based on vegetable juice and tea devised by Rudolf Breuss (1899–1990), who claimed it could cure cancer. Physicians have said that, in common with other "cancer diets", there is no evidence of effectiveness and some risk of harm.
- Budwig protocol (or Budwig diet) – an "anti-cancer" diet developed in the 1950s by Johanna Budwig (1908–2003). The diet is rich in flaxseed oil mixed with cottage cheese, and emphasizes meals high in fruit, vegetables and fiber; it avoids sugar, animal fats, salad oil, meats, butter and especially margarine. Cancer Research UK say, "there is no reliable evidence to show that the Budwig diet [...] helps people with cancer".
- Fasting and intermittent fasting – not eating or drinking for a period – a practice which has been claimed by some alternative medicine practitioners to help fight cancer, perhaps by "starving" tumors. However, according to the American Cancer Society, "available scientific evidence does not support claims that fasting is effective for preventing or treating cancer in humans". Professional societies in France and the United Kingdom reached similar conclusions.
- Hallelujah diet – a restrictive "biblical" diet based on raw food, claimed by its inventor to have cured his cancer. Stephen Barrett has written on Quackwatch: "Although low-fat, high-fiber diets can be healthful, the Hallelujah Diet is unbalanced and can lead to serious deficiencies." Harriet Hall at Science-Based Medicine agrees, adding the diet "makes no sense".
- Ketogenic diet – a severe carbohydrate-restricted diet that induces ketosis and is used for the treatment of drug-resistant epilepsy. Advocates assume the diet avoids "fuelling" cancer tumors and say the diet can be used as a substitute for conventional treatment, but their claims are not supported by medical evidence.
- Kousmine diet – a restrictive diet devised by Catherine Kousmine (1904–1992) which emphasized fruit, vegetables, grains, pulses and the use of vitamin supplements. There is no evidence that the diet is an effective cancer treatment.
- Macrobiotic diet – a restrictive diet based on grains and unrefined foods, and promoted by some as a preventative and cure for cancer. Cancer Research UK states "we don't support the use of macrobiotic diets for people with cancer".
- McDougall diet – a restrictive low-fat, starch based vegan diet devised by John A. McDougall. The diet is low in fat, high in fiber and contains no cholesterol. McDougall has promoted the diet as an alternative treatment for a number of chronic disorders, including cancer. However, there is no scientific evidence that McDougall's diet is effective.
- Moerman Therapy – a highly restrictive diet devised by Cornelis Moerman (1893–1988). Its effectiveness is supported by anecdote only – there is no evidence of its worth as a cancer treatment.
- Superfood – a marketing term applied to certain foods with supposed health-giving properties. Cancer Research UK note that superfoods are often promoted as having an ability to prevent or cure diseases, including cancer; they caution, "a healthy, balanced and varied diet can help to reduce the risk of cancer but it is unlikely that any single food will make a major difference on its own."

== Electromagnetic and energy-based ==
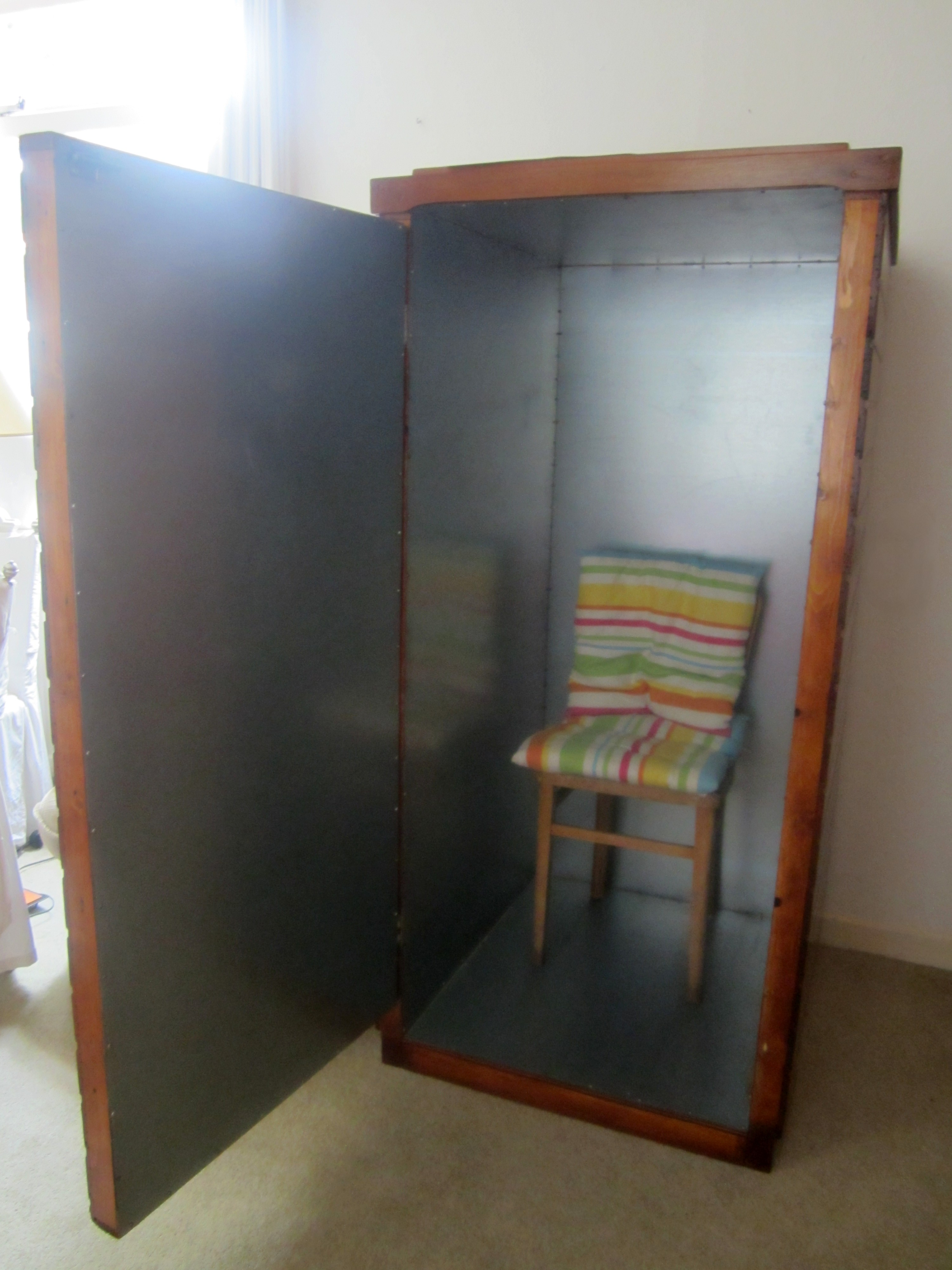
An orgone accumulator – a subject sitting in one is meant to experience the effects of orgone, an energy force proposed by Wilhelm Reich.

- Bioresonance therapy – diagnosis and therapy delivered by attaching an electrical device to the patient, on the basis that cancer cells emit certain electromagnetic oscillations. The Memorial Sloan Kettering Cancer Center says that such claims are not supported by any evidence and note that the U.S. Food and Drug Administration has prosecuted many sellers of such devices.
- Electrohomeopathy (or Mattei cancer cure) – a treatment devised by Count Cesare Mattei (1809–1896), who proposed that different "colors" of electricity could be used to treat cancer. Popular in the late nineteenth century, electrohomeopathy has been described as "utter idiocy".
- Electro Physiological Feedback Xrroid – an electronic device promoted as being capable of diagnosing and treating cancer and a host of other ailments. However, according to Quackwatch: "The Quantum Xrroid device is claimed to balance 'bio-energetic' forces that the scientific community does not recognize as real. It mainly reflects skin resistance (how easily low-voltage electric currents from the device pass through the skin), which is not related to the body's health."
- Light therapy – the use of light to treat medical conditions. According to the American Cancer Society, alternative approaches—such as chromotherapy or the use of light boxes—have not been shown to be effective for cancer treatment.
- Magnetic therapy – the practice of placing magnets on and around the body in order to treat illness. Although this has been promoted as a treatment for cancer and other diseases, the American Cancer Society says, "available scientific evidence does not support these claims".
- Orgone – a type of life force proposed to exist by Wilhelm Reich (1897–1957) which he claimed could be harnessed to cure diseases, including cancer, perhaps by sitting inside an "orgone accumulator"—a cupboard-like box with metal and organic linings. Quackwatch comments that scientists investigating Reich's ideas have been "unable to find the slightest evidence in Reich's data or elsewhere that such a thing as orgone exists".
- Polarity therapy – a type of energy medicine based on the idea that the positive or negative charge of a person's electromagnetic field affects their health. Although it is promoted as effective for curing a number of human ailments, including cancer, the American Cancer Society says "available scientific evidence does not support claims that polarity therapy is effective in treating cancer or any other disease".
- Rife Frequency Generator – an electronic device purported to cure cancer by transmitting radio waves. Cancer Research UK states, "there is no evidence to show that the Rife machine does what its supporters say it does".
- Therapeutic Touch (or TT) – contrary to its name, a technique that does not usually involve touching; rather, a practitioner holds their hands close to a patient to affect the "energy" in their body. According to the American Cancer Society, "available scientific evidence does not support any claims that TT can cure cancer or other diseases".
- Zoetron therapy – therapy based around a large electromagnetic device that emitted a weak field which, it was claimed, could kill cancer cells. Patients were charged US$15,000 up-front for treatment in Mexican clinics. In 2005 criminal charges were brought against the owners of the company making the device for their claims of its worth. Quackwatch says: "there is no scientific evidence or reason to believe that exposure to weak magnetic fields will kill any cells".

== Hybrid ==
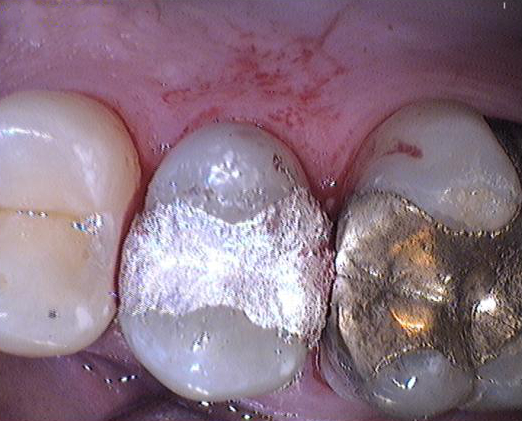
In Issels treatment all metal fillings are removed from the teeth.

- Clark's "Cure for All Cancers" – an alternative medicine regime promoted by Hulda Regehr Clark (1928–2009), who (before her death from cancer) claimed it could cure all human diseases, including all cancers. The regime was based on the false belief that the disease was caused by "parasites", a common false claim among alternative cancer treatments, and included herbal remedies, chelation therapy and the use of electronic devices. Quackwatch describes her notions as "absurd".
- Contreras therapy – treatment offered at the Oasis of Hope Hospital in Tijuana, Mexico which includes a number of ineffective treatments including the use of amygdalin and metabolic therapy. The Memorial Sloan Kettering Cancer Center lists "Contreras Therapy" alongside others which "show no evidence of efficacy".
- Gerson therapy – a predominantly diet regime, generally based on limiting salt, protein and other foods; ingesting large quantities of fruit and vegetables through juicing; augmenting the intake of potassium and iodine; and the use of coffee enemas. According to Cancer Research UK, "available scientific evidence does not support any claims that Gerson therapy can treat cancer [...] Gerson therapy can be very harmful to your health."
- Gonzalez protocol – a treatment regime devised by Nicholas Gonzalez (1947–2015) based on Gerson therapy. The treatment is a type of metabolic therapy that has no evidence of efficacy.
- Hoxsey therapy – a treatment consisting of a caustic herbal paste for external cancers or a herbal mixture for "internal" cancers, combined with laxatives, douches, vitamin supplements and dietary changes. A review by the Memorial Sloan Kettering Cancer Center found no evidence that the Hoxsey Therapy was effective as a treatment for cancer.
- Issels treatment – a regime recommended to be used alongside conventional treatment. It requires removal of metal fillings from the patient's mouth, and adherence to a restrictive diet. Cancer Research UK state: "There is no scientific or medical evidence to back up the claims made by the Issels website".
- Kelley treatment – a treatment regime devised by William Donald Kelley (1925–2005) based on Gerson therapy, with additional features including prayer and osteopathic manipulation. Famously, Steve McQueen used it for three months before his death. According to the Memorial Sloan Kettering Cancer Center, Kelley treatment is a type of metabolic therapy that shows "no evidence of efficacy".
- Live blood analysis – in alternative medicine, the practice of examining blood samples under a high-powered microscope, claiming this can detect and predict cancer and other illnesses, so leading to a prescription of dietary supplements that are supposed to function as treatment. The practice has been dismissed as quackery by the medical profession.
- Livingston-Wheeler Therapy – a therapeutic regime that included a restricted diet, various drugs, therapy and the use of enemas. According to the American Cancer Society, "available scientific evidence does not support claims that Livingston-Wheeler therapy was effective in treating cancer or any other disease".
- Lorraine Day's 10-step program – a regime devised by Lorraine Day based on a restrictive diet and behavioral changes, such as giving up work and ceasing to watch television. Stephen Barrett wrote on Quackwatch, "In my opinion, her advice is untrustworthy and is particularly dangerous to people with cancer".
- Metabolic therapies – an umbrella term for diet- and enema-based "detoxification" regimes, such as the Gerson therapy, promoted to cure cancer and other disease. The Memorial Sloan Kettering Cancer Center states: "Retrospective reviews of the Gerson, Kelley and Contreras therapies show no evidence of efficacy."
- Nieper therapy – a regimen devised by Hans Alfred Nieper (1928–1998) which was based on taking a variety of substances, including amygdalin and vitamins, and which Nieper claimed could treat a variety of serious ailments, including cancer. His methods were discredited as both ineffective and unsafe.

== Plant- and fungus-based ==
- Actaea racemosa (or black cohosh) – a flowering plant from which dietary supplements are made that are promoted for their claimed health-giving properties. It is of no use preventing or treating cancer. Black cohosh may cause liver damage, and may be unsafe for use by those with hormone-sensitive cancers.
- Aloe – a genus of flowering succulent plants native to Africa. According to Cancer Research UK, a potentially deadly product called T-UP is made of concentrated aloe, and promoted as a cancer cure. They say "there is currently no evidence that aloe products can help to prevent or treat cancer in humans".
- Andrographis paniculata – a herb used in Ayurvedic medicine, and promoted as a dietary supplement for cancer prevention and cure. The Memorial Sloan Kettering Cancer Center has stated that there is no evidence that it helps prevent or cure cancer.
- Aveloz (also called firestick plant, pencil tree or Euphorbia tirucalli) – a succulent shrub native to parts of Africa and South America. Its sap is promoted as a cancer treatment; however, according to the American Cancer Society, studies suggest that "aveloz sap may actually suppress the immune system, promote tumor growth, and lead to the development of certain types of cancer".
- Bach flower remedies – preparations devised by Edward Bach (1886–1936) in which tiny amounts of plant material are diluted in a mixture of water and brandy. According to Cancer Research UK, flower remedies are sometimes promoted as being capable of boosting the immune system, but "there is no scientific evidence to prove that flower remedies can control, cure or prevent any type of disease, including cancer".

- Cannabidiol – a phytocannabinoid extracted from the cannabis plant. Many claims are made for the therapeutic benefit of cannabidiol that are not backed by sound evidence. Some claims—for example that cannabidiol be used to treat cancer—fall into the realm of pseudoscience.
- Cannabis – Used as a recreational and medicinal drug. Chemicals derived from cannabis have been extensively researched for potential anti-cancer effect and while there has been much laboratory work, claims that cannabis has been proven to cure cancer are—according to Cancer Research UK—"highly misleading". The U.S. National Cancer Institute notes "Cannabis is not approved by the FDA for the treatment of any cancer-related symptom or side effect of cancer therapy."
- Cansema (also called black salve) – a type of paste or poultice often promoted as a cancer cure, especially for skin cancer. According to the American Cancer Society, there is no evidence that this escharotic is effective in treating cancer, and it can be harmful, causing burns and disfigurement.

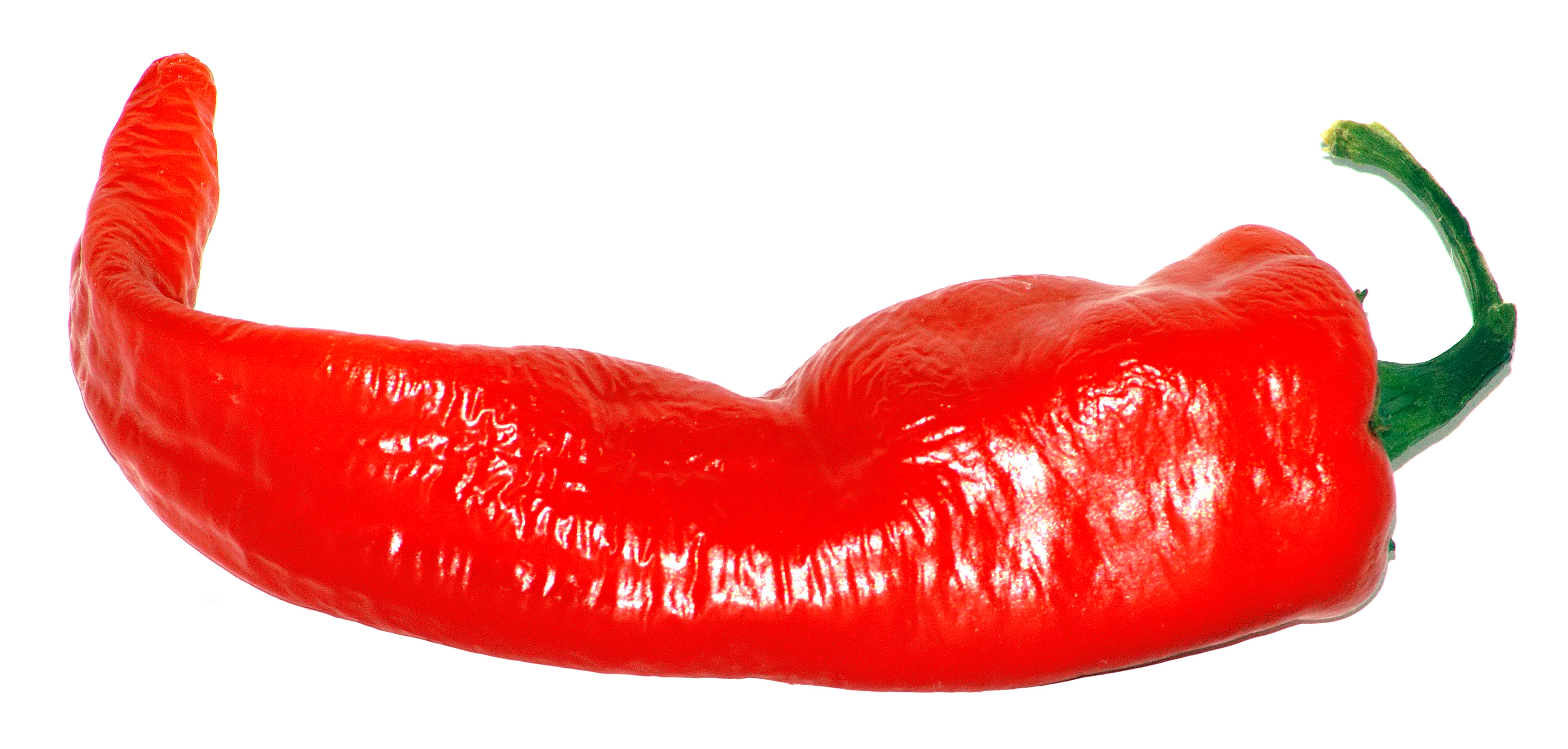
A cayenne pepper – products based on peppers are promoted as cancer treatments.

- Capsicum – the name given to a group of plants in the nightshade family, well known for producing hot chilli peppers such as the cayenne pepper and the jalapeño. A number of capsicum-based products, including teas and capsules, are promoted for their health benefits, including as a claimed cancer treatment. However, according to the American Cancer Society, "available scientific research does not support claims for the effectiveness of capsicum or whole pepper supplements in preventing or curing cancer at this time".
- Carctol – a herbal dietary supplement made from ayurvedic herbs. It has been aggressively marketed in the United Kingdom as a cancer treatment, but there is no evidence of its effectiveness.
- Cassava – a woody shrub native to South America, the root of which is a carbohydrate-rich foodstuff. Cassava root has been promoted as treatment for cancer. However, according to the American Cancer Society, "there is no convincing scientific evidence that cassava or tapioca is effective in preventing or treating cancer".
- Castor oil – an oil made from the seeds of the castor oil plant. The claim has been made that applying it to the skin can help cure cancer. However, according to the American Cancer Society, "available scientific evidence does not support claims that castor oil on the skin cures cancer or any other disease."
- Chaparral (or Larrea tridentata) – a plant used to make a herbal remedy which is sold as cancer treatment. Cancer Research UK state that: "We don't recommend that you take chaparral to treat or prevent any type of cancer."
- Chlorella – a type of algae promoted for its health-giving properties, including a claimed ability to treat cancer. However, according to the American Cancer Society, "available scientific studies do not support its effectiveness for preventing or treating cancer or any other disease in humans".
- Echinacea – a group of herbaceous flowering plants in the daisy family, marketed as a herbal supplement that can help combat cancer. According to Cancer Research UK, "there is no scientific evidence to show that echinacea can help treat, prevent or cure cancer in any way."
- Ellagic acid – a natural phenol found in some foods, especially berries, and which has been marketed as having the ability to prevent and treat a number of human maladies, including cancer. According to the American Cancer Society, such claims are not proven.
- Essiac – a blended herbal tea devised in the early 20th century and promoted as a cancer cure. The U.S. Food and Drug Administration include Essiac in a list of "Fake Cancer 'Cures' Consumers Should Avoid".
- Fermented wheat germ extract (FWGE) – a concentrated extract of wheat germ sold with the brand names Avemar and Awge. FWGE is marketed with a number of misleading medical claims, including that it supports the immune system and is useful in the treatment of cancer.

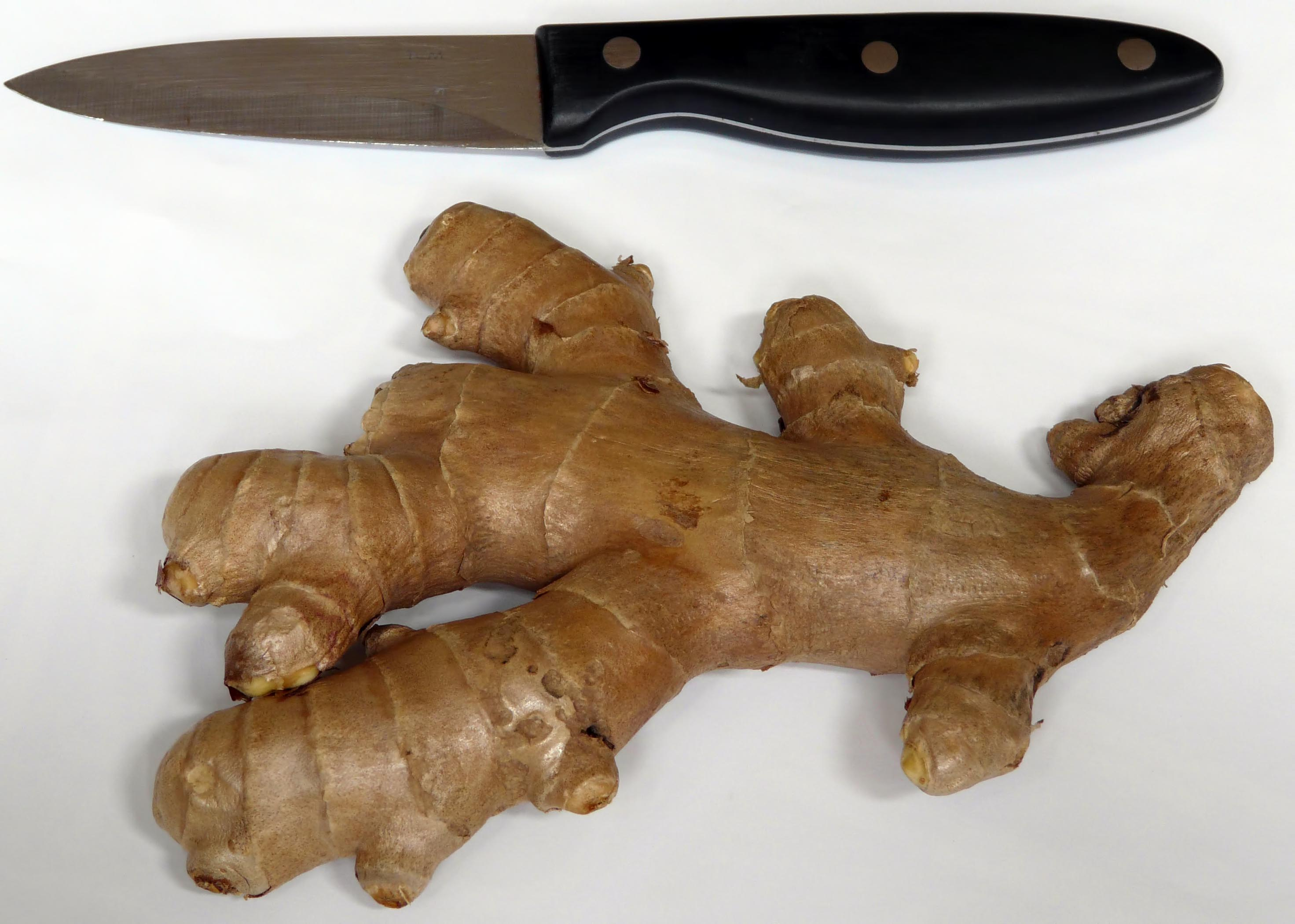
An unpeeled ginger root beside a knife; while ginger has been promoted for halting tumor growth, evidence is lacking

- Ginger – a root of plants of the Zingiber family, and a popular spice in many types of cuisine. Ginger has been promoted as a cancer treatment for its supposed ability to halt tumor growth; however, according to the American Cancer Society, "available scientific evidence does not support this".
- Ginseng – a species of perennial plant, the root of which is promoted for its therapeutic value, including a claimed ability to help fight cancer. However, according to the American Cancer Society, "available scientific evidence does not support claims that ginseng is effective in preventing or treating cancer in humans".
- Glyconutrients – types of sugar extracted from plants; they are mostly marketed in a product with the brand name "Ambrotose" by Mannatech, Inc. According to the Memorial Sloan Kettering Cancer Center, these products have been "promoted aggressively to cancer patients" on the basis that they can help cellular health and boost the immune system, but "strong scientific evidence to support these claims is lacking".
- Goldenseal (or Hydrastis canadensis) – an herb from the buttercup family promoted for treating many conditions, including cancer. According to the American Cancer Society, "evidence does not support claims that goldenseal is effective in treating cancer or other diseases. Goldenseal can have toxic side effects, and high doses can cause death."
- Gotu kola – a swamp plant native to parts of Asia and Africa. Supplements made from it are promoted as cancer treatment; however, according to the American Cancer Society, "available scientific evidence does not support claims of its effectiveness for treating cancer or any other disease in humans".

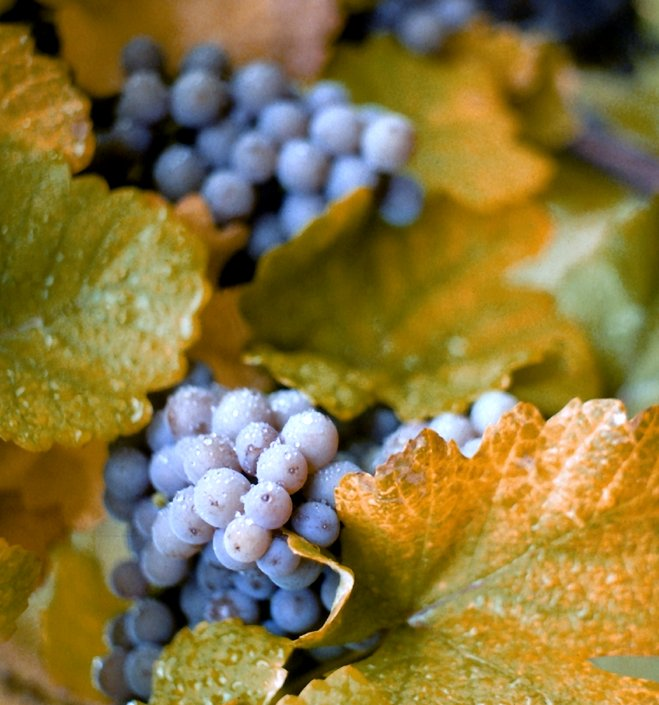
Grapes – there is very little evidence that eating them can help prevent or treat cancer.

- Grapes – fruit, popularized for supposed anti-cancer effect by Johanna Brandt (1876–1964) who championed a "grape diet", and promoted more recently in the form of grape seed extract (GSE). According to the American Cancer Society, "there is very little reliable scientific evidence available at this time that drinking red wine, eating grapes, or following the grape diet can prevent or treat cancer in people".
- Inonotus obliquus – commonly known as chaga mushroom. Chaga has been used as a folk remedy in Russia and Siberia since the 16th century. According to the Memorial Sloan Kettering Cancer Center, "no clinical trials have been conducted to assess chaga's safety and efficacy for disease prevention or for the treatment of cancer, cardiovascular disease, or diabetes". They caution that the mushroom extract can interact with other drugs.
- Juice Plus – a branded line of dietary supplements containing concentrated fruit and vegetable juice extract. In October 2009, Barrie R. Cassileth, chair and chief of integrative medicine at Memorial Sloan Kettering Cancer Center, cautioned that while Juice Plus is being "aggressively promoted to cancer patients based on claims of antioxidant effects", the supplement should not be taken by patients because it can interfere with chemotherapy, nor should it be considered a substitute for fruit and vegetables.
- Juicing (or juice therapy) – the practice of consuming juice made from raw fruit and vegetables. This has been claimed to bring many benefits such as slowing aging or curing cancer; however, according to the American Cancer Society, "there is no convincing scientific evidence that extracted juices are healthier than whole foods".

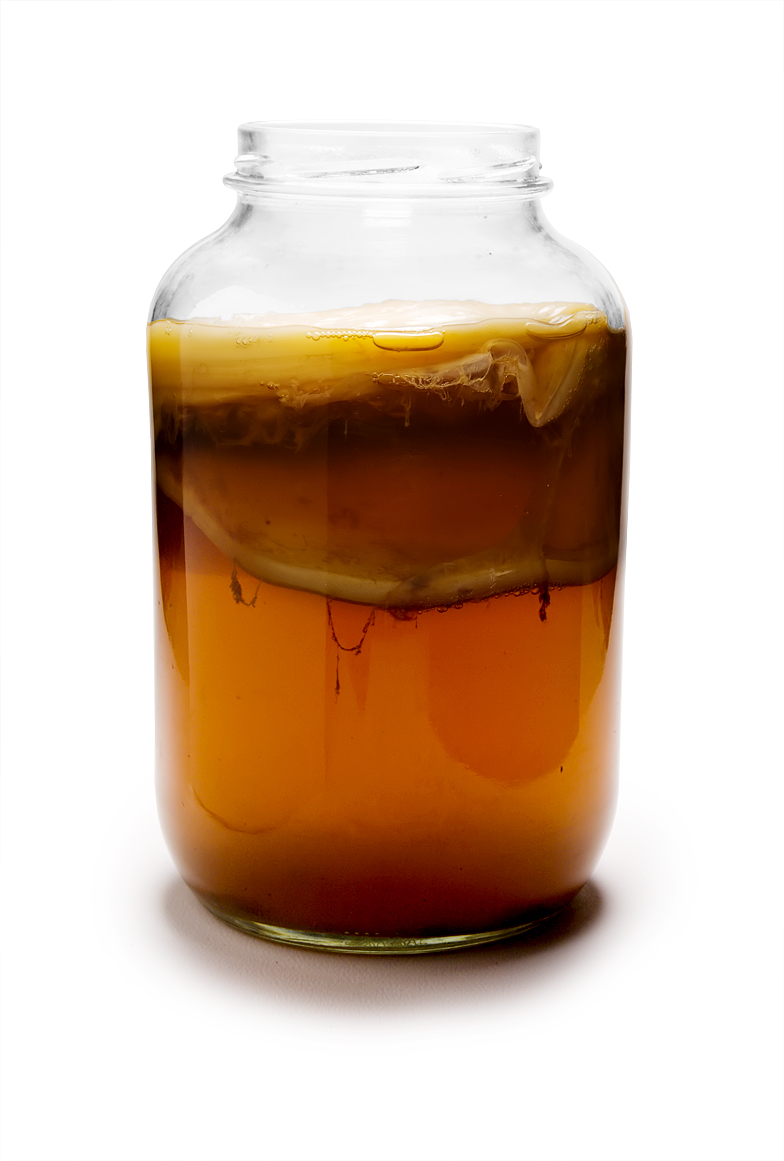
Kombucha – a fermented tea promoted as a "cure all"

- Kombucha – a kind of fermented tea claimed to cure a variety of human illnesses including AIDS and cancer; however, these purported uses are not backed by evidence. The consumption of kombucha has been associated with adverse effects including muscle inflammation, poisoning and infection. At least one person has died after consuming kombucha, but the death could not be specifically linked to the drink.
- Laetrile is a trade name for an amygdalin derivitive. It is a glycoside that has been promoted as a cancer cure. It has been found to be ineffective and toxic. Its promotion has been described as "the slickest, most sophisticated, and certainly the most remunerative cancer quack promotion in medical history."
- Mangosteen – a fruit native to Southeast Asia which is promoted as a "superfruit" and in products such as XanGo juice for treating a variety of human ailments. According to the American Cancer Society, "there is no reliable evidence that mangosteen juice, puree, or bark is effective as a treatment for cancer in humans".
- Milk thistle (Silybum marianum) – a biennial plant that grows in many locations over the world. Cancer Research UK say that milk thistle is promoted on the internet for its claimed ability to slow certain kinds of cancer, but that there is no good evidence in support of these claims.

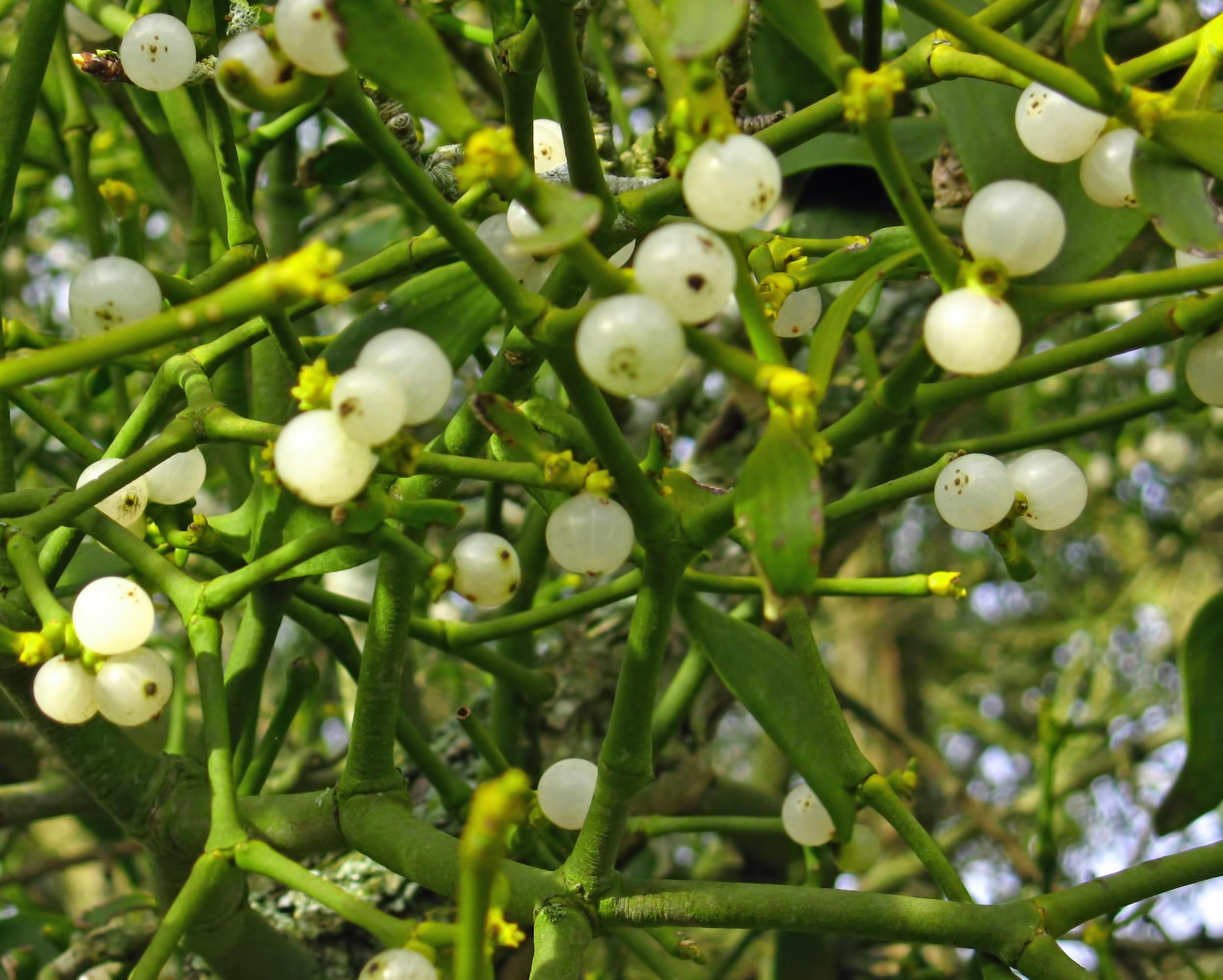
Mistletoe – Anthroposophical medicine holds that harvesting it when the planets are aligned will yield a cancer treatment.

- Mistletoe – a plant used in anthroposophical medicine, proposed as a cancer cure (in the form of mistletoe extract, called Iscador or Helixor) by Rudolf Steiner (1861–1925), who believed it needed to be harvested when planetary alignment most influenced its potency. According to the American Cancer Society, "available evidence from well-designed clinical trials does not support claims that mistletoe can improve length or quality of life".
- Modified citrus pectin – a substance chemically extracted from citrus fruits and marketed in dietary supplement form as a treatment for prostate cancer and melanoma. According to Cancer Research UK, it has "not been shown to have any activity in fighting cancer in people".
- Moxibustion – the practice, used in conjunction with acupuncture or acupressure, of burning dried-up mugwort near the patient. The American Cancer Society comments, "available scientific evidence does not support claims that moxibustion is effective in preventing or treating cancer or any other disease".
- Mushrooms – promoted on the internet as useful for cancer treatment. According to Cancer Research UK, "there is currently no evidence that any type of mushroom or mushroom extract can prevent or cure cancer".
- Nerium oleander (or oleander) – one of the most poisonous of commonly grown garden plants, is the basis of an extract which is promoted to treat cancer and other ailments. According to the American Cancer Society, "even a small amount of oleander can cause death", and "the effectiveness of oleander has not been proven".
- Noni juice – juice derived from the fruit of the Morinda citrifolia tree indigenous to Southeast Asia, Australasia, and the Caribbean. Noni juice has been promoted as a cure for cancer. However, The American Cancer Society say "there is no reliable clinical evidence that noni juice is effective in preventing or treating cancer or any other disease in humans".
- Pau d'arco – a large South American rainforest tree whose bark (sometimes brewed into "lapacho" tea) is promoted as a treatment for many ailments, including cancer. According to the American Cancer Society, "available evidence from well-designed, controlled studies does not support this substance as an effective treatment for cancer in humans".
- PC-SPES – a herbal supplement marketed (alongside similar supplements PC-CARE, PC-HOPE and PC-PLUS) as a treatment for prostate cancer. It has no medical benefit.
- Pygeum – an extract made from Prunus africana, the African cherry. Following excitement at the end of the twentieth century about pygeum's therapeutic potential for treating benign prostatic hyperplasia, subsequent research has found it to have no benefit.
- Rauvolfia serpentina (or snakeroot) – a plant used as the basis of a herbal remedy that some believe may treat cancer. According to the American Cancer Society: "Available scientific evidence does not support claims that Indian snakeroot is effective in treating cancer [...] It also has many dangerous side effects and is likely to increase the risk of cancer."
- Red clover (Trifolium pratense) – a European species of clover, promoted as a treatment for a variety of health conditions, including cancers. According to the American Cancer Society, "available clinical evidence does not show that red clover is effective in treating or preventing cancer, menopausal symptoms, or any other medical conditions."
- Saw palmetto (Serenoa repens) – a type of palm tree found growing in the southeastern United States. Its extract has been promoted as a prostate cancer medicine; however, according to the American Cancer Society, "available scientific studies do not support claims that saw palmetto can prevent or treat prostate cancer in humans".
- Seasilver – an expensive dietary supplement made mostly from plant extracts and promoted by two U.S. companies. Extravagant claims for its curative powers led to the prosecution and fining of the companies' owners. According to the Memorial Sloan Kettering Cancer Center, "no studies have shown the efficacy of this costly product".

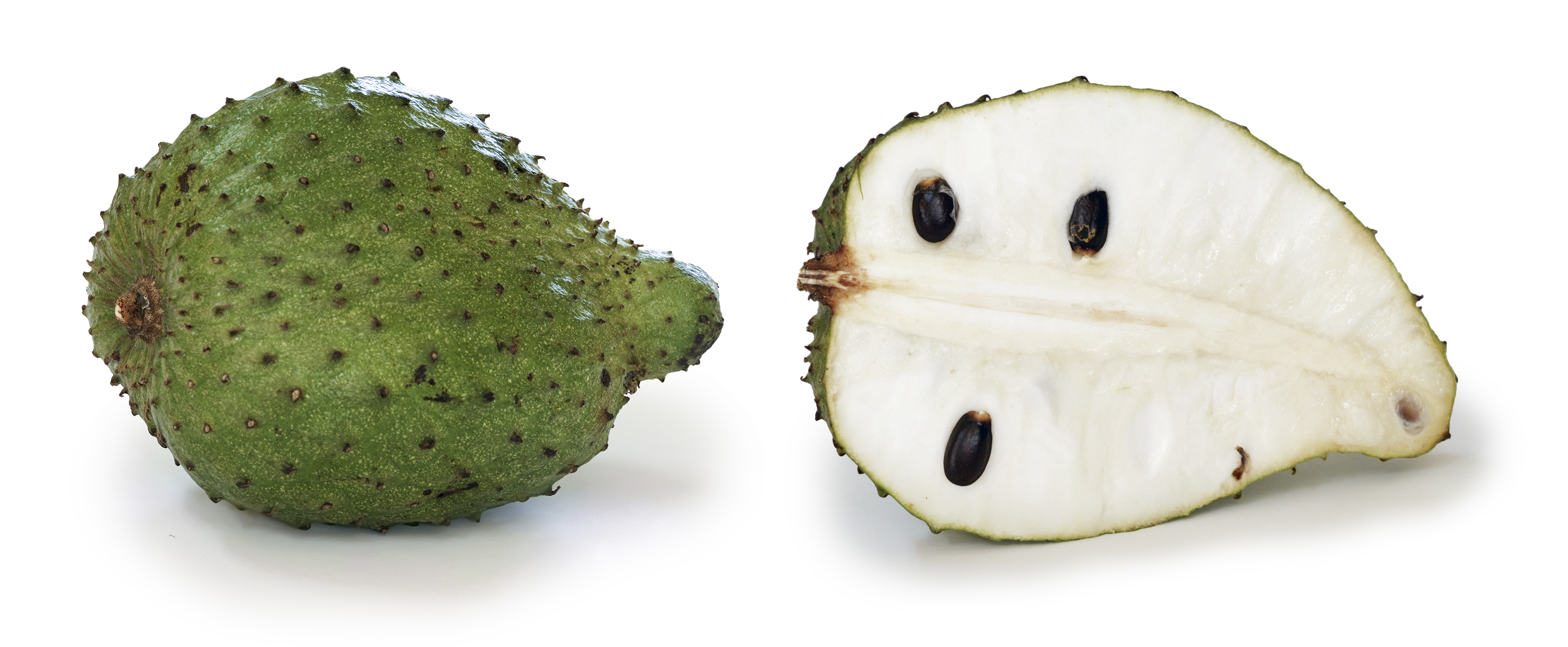
Soursop – an ineffective treatment heavily promoted on the internet

- Soursop (or graviola) – According to the U.S. Federal Trade Commission soursop extract is among those products for which there is "no credible scientific evidence" of an ability to "prevent, cure, or treat cancer of any kind".
- Strychnos nux-vomica – a tree native to Asia, the bark of which contains toxic strychnine. Strychnos is promoted within herbal medicine as being a treatment for a wide range of maladies including cancer and heart disease; there is, however, no evidence it is useful for treating any condition.
- Ukrain – the trademarked name of a drug (sometimes called "celandine") made from Chelidonium majus, a plant in the poppy family. The drug is promoted for its health giving powers and its ability to treat cancer; however, according to the American Cancer Society, "available scientific evidence does not support claims that celandine is effective in treating cancer in humans".
- Uncaria tomentosa (or cat's claw) – a woody vine found in the tropical jungles of South and Central America, which is promoted as a remedy for cancer and other disease. The American Cancer Society state: "Available scientific evidence also does not support cat's claw's effectiveness in preventing or treating cancer or any other disease. Cat's claw is linked to some serious side effects, although the extent of those effects is not known".

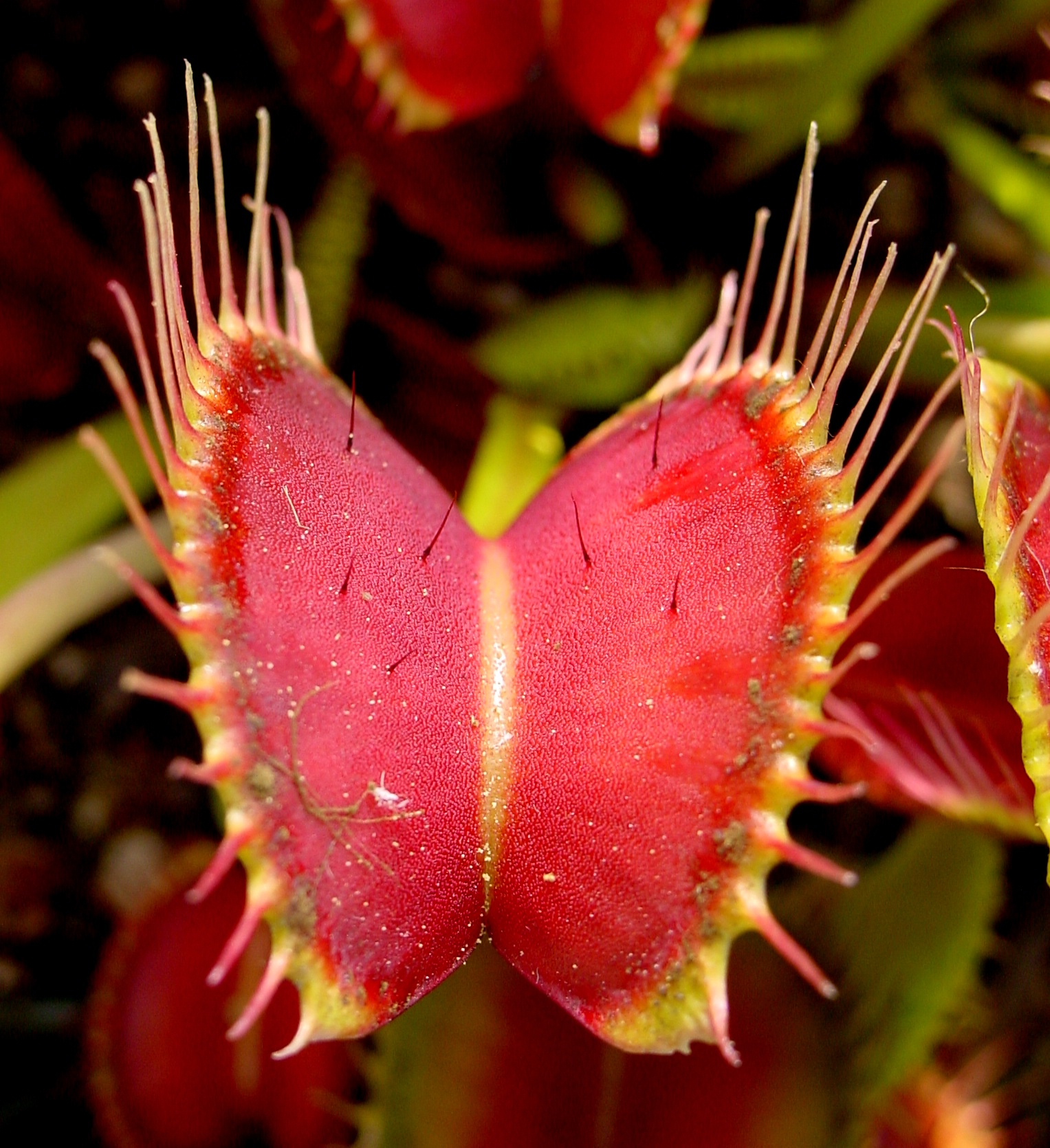
Venus flytrap – its extract is promoted as a cure for skin cancer.

- Venus flytrap – a carnivorous plant, the extract of which has been promoted as a treatment for a variety of human ailments including skin cancer. According to the American Cancer Society, "available scientific evidence does not support claims that extract from the Venus flytrap plant is effective in treating skin cancer or any other type of cancer".
- Walnuts – large, hard edible seeds of any tree of the genus Juglans. Black walnut has been promoted as a cancer cure on the basis it kills a "parasite" responsible for the disease. There exist walnut hull tinctures made with kerosene or other oil products; one such product which was intended to be used as a cancer treatment, named Todicamp and produced by Todicamp SRL, was recognized as harmful. According to the American Cancer Society, "available scientific evidence does not support claims that hulls from black walnuts remove parasites from the intestinal tract or that they are effective in treating cancer or any other disease".
- Wheatgrass – a food made from grains of wheat. According to the American Cancer Society, although some wheatgrass champions claim it can "shrink" cancer tumors, "available scientific evidence does not support the idea that wheatgrass or the wheatgrass diet can cure or prevent disease".
- Wild yam (or Chinese yam) – types of yam, the roots of which are made into creams and dietary supplements that are promoted for a variety of medicinal purposes, including cancer prevention. The American Cancer Society says of these products, "available scientific evidence does not support claims that they are safe or effective."
- Wilburn Ferguson's solution – a mixture of plants that were supposedly used by the Shuar people for the purpose of shrinking heads, that he claimed was also effective in treating cancerous tumors. No trials conducted according to modern scientific standards have ever shown that this solution is successful in curing cancer.

== Physical procedures ==
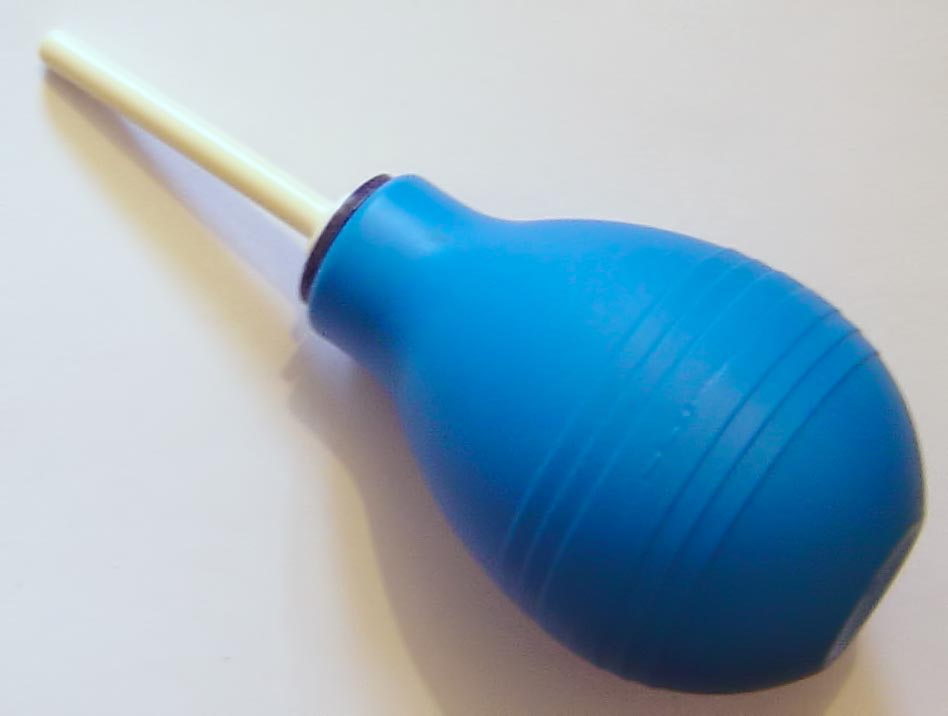
A rectal bulb syringe – enemas feature in a number of ineffective cancer treatments such as Gerson therapy and colon cleansing.

- Acupuncture – a mainstay of traditional Chinese medicine, acupuncture attempts to regulate the flow of a supposed energy within the body by means of inserting needles through the skin at certain pre-designated points. Although there is some evidence that suggests acupuncture may help relieve some symptoms associated with cancer, such as treatment side effects, there is no evidence to support claims that acupuncture is an effective treatment for cancer.
- Applied kinesiology – the practice of diagnosing and treating illness by touching and observing patients to detect meaningful signs in the muscles. Claims have been made that in a session, "spontaneous remission" of cancer can be observed. However, according to the American Cancer Society, "available scientific evidence does not support the claim that applied kinesiology can diagnose or treat cancer or other illness".
- Chiropractic – the practice of manipulating the spine to treat many human ailments. According to the American Cancer Society, "available scientific evidence does not support claims that chiropractic treatment cures cancer or any other life-threatening illness".
- Craniosacral therapy (or CST) – a treatment devised by John Upledger in the 1970s. A CST practitioner will massage a patient's scalp in the belief that the precise positioning of their cranial bones can have a profound impact on their health. However, according to the American Cancer Society, "available scientific evidence does not support claims that craniosacral therapy helps in treating cancer or any other disease".
- Colon cleansing – the practice of cleansing the colon using laxatives and enemas to "detoxify" the body. Coffee enemas in particular are promoted as a cancer therapy. According to the American Cancer Society, "available scientific evidence does not support claims that colon therapy is effective in treating cancer or any other disease".
- Cupping – a procedure in which cups are used to create areas of suction on the body. Although claimed by proponents as an alternative cancer treatment, the American Cancer Society say "available scientific evidence does not support claims that cupping has any health benefits".
- Dance therapy – the use of dance or physical movement to improve physical or mental well-being. The American Cancer Society states, "Few scientific studies have been done to evaluate the effects of dance therapy on health, prevention and recovery from illness. Clinical reports suggest dance therapy may be effective in improving self-esteem and reducing stress. As a form of exercise, dance therapy can be useful for both physical and emotional aspects of quality of life." A Cochrane review found too few studies to draw any conclusions about what effects dance therapy has on psychological or physical outcomes in cancer patients.
- Ear candling – an alternative medical technique in which lighted candles are placed in the ears for supposed therapeutic effect. The practice has been promoted with extravagant claims it can "purify the blood" or "cure" cancer, but Health Canada has found it has no health benefit; it does, however, carry a serious risk of injury.
- Psychic surgery – a sleight-of-hand confidence trick in which the practitioner pretends to remove a lump of tissue (typically raw animal entrails bought from a butcher) from a person. No evidence of objective benefit for any medical condition has been found.
- Reiki – a procedure in which the practitioner might look at, blow on, tap and touch a patient in an attempt to affect the "energy" in their body. Although there is some evidence that reiki sessions are relaxing and so might improve general well-being, Cancer Research UK say that "there is no scientific evidence to prove that Reiki can prevent, treat or cure cancer or any other disease".
- Shiatsu – a type of alternative medicine consisting of finger and palm pressure, stretches and other massage techniques. According to Cancer Research UK, "there is no scientific evidence to prove that shiatsu can cure or prevent any type of disease, including cancer."

== Spiritual and mental healing ==
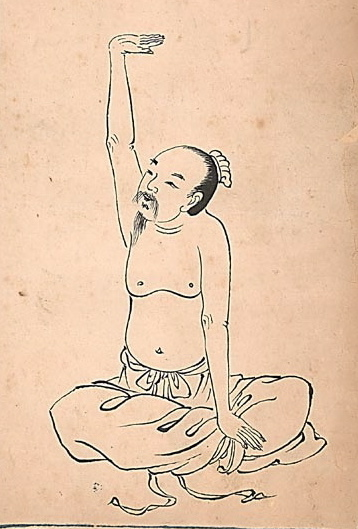
Qigong – a kind of meditation accompanied by gentle movements

- Cancer guided imagery – the practice of attempting to treat cancer in oneself by imagining it away. According to the American Cancer Society, "available scientific evidence does not support claims that imagery can influence the development or progress of cancer".
- Faith healing – the attempt to cure disease by spiritual means, often by prayer or participation in religious ritual. According to the American Cancer Society, "available scientific evidence does not support claims that faith healing can actually cure physical ailments".
- Hypnosis – the induction of a deeply relaxed and yet alert mental state. Some practitioners have claimed hypnosis might help boost the immune system. However, according to the American Cancer Society, "available scientific evidence does not support the idea that hypnosis can influence the development or progression of cancer.".
- Meditation (also Transcendental Meditation and Mindfulness) – mind-body practices in which patients attempt to master their own mental processes. According to the American Cancer Society while meditation "may help to improve the quality of life for people with cancer", "available scientific evidence does not suggest that meditation is effective in treating cancer or any other disease."
- Neuro-linguistic programming (NLP) – a series of behavioral techniques based on various supposed relationships between language and mental processes. NLP has been promoted as a treatment for HIV/AIDS and cancer, but such claims have no evidence to support them.
- Anti-cancer psychotherapy – a technique claiming that a "cancer personality" caused cancer, which could be cured through talk therapy (e.g. that of the Simonton Cancer Center, Bernie Siegel's "Exceptional Cancer Patients" (ECaP) or Deepak Chopra). There is no reliable evidence that cancer cures sold or promoted by Deepak Chopra have any value.
- Qigong – the practice of maintaining a meditative state while making gentle and fluid bodily movements, in an attempt to balance internal life energy. A systematic review of the effect of qigong exercises on cancer treatment concluded "the effectiveness of qigong in cancer care is not yet supported by the evidence from rigorous clinical trials."

== Synthetic chemicals and other substances ==
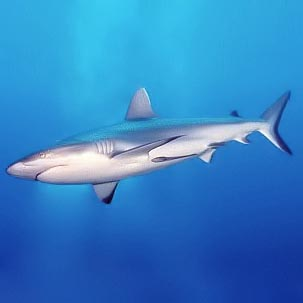
Shark cartilage might be thought of as a cancer treatment because of a mistaken belief that sharks do not get cancer.

- 714-X – sometimes called "trimethylbicyclonitramineoheptane chloride", is a mixture of chemicals marketed commercially as a cure for many human ailments, including cancer. There is no scientific evidence for any anti-cancer effect from 714-X.
- Antineoplaston therapy – a form of chemotherapy promoted by the Burzynski Clinic in Texas, United States. The American Cancer Society has found no evidence that antineoplastons have any beneficial effects in cancer, and it has recommended that people do not spend money on antineoplaston treatments.
- Apitherapy – the use of products derived from bees, such as honey and bee venom, as a therapy. Apitherapy has been promoted for its anti-cancer effects; however, according to the American Cancer Society, "there have been no clinical studies in humans showing that bee venom or other honeybee products are effective in preventing or treating cancer."
- Cancell (also called Protocel, Sheridan's Formula, Jim's Juice, Crocinic Acid, JS–114, JS–101, 126–F and Entelev) – a formula that has been promoted as a treatment for a wide range of diseases, including cancer. The American Cancer Society and Memorial Sloan Kettering Cancer Center recommend against the use of CanCell, as there is no evidence that it is effective in treating any disease, and its proposed method of action is not consistent with modern science.
- Cantelmoism – an alternative health belief system associated with claims about cancer treatment using DMT. Its efficacy as a cancer treatment has not been established by reliable clinical evidence.
- Cell therapy – the practice of injecting cellular material from animals in an attempt to prevent or treat cancer. Although the use of human-to-human cell therapy has some established medical uses, the injection of animal material is, according to the American Cancer Society, not backed by any evidence of effectiveness, and "may in fact be lethal".
- Caesium chloride – a toxic salt, promoted as a cancer cure (sometimes as "high pH therapy"), on the basis that it targets cancer cells. However, there is no evidence to support these claims, while serious adverse reactions have been reported. These include hypokalemia, arrhythmia and acute cardiac arrest.
- Chelation therapy – removal of metals from the body by administering chelating agents. Chelation therapy is a legitimate therapy for heavy metal poisoning, but it has also been promoted as an alternative treatment for diseases including cancer. The American Cancer Society says: "Available scientific evidence does not support claims that it is effective for treating other conditions such as cancer. Chelation therapy can be toxic and has the potential to cause kidney damage, irregular heartbeat and even death."
- Cytokine therapy (or Klehr's autologous tumor therapy) – a so-called immunotherapy with a therapeutic substrate made of cytokines from the cancer patients' blood. The inventor of this method is Nikolaus Walther Klehr, a dermatologist, who practiced it in his private clinics in Salzburg and Munich. The patients were mainly from Slovenia, Poland and other Eastern European countries. Klehr is reported as claiming that his treatment leads to extended lifespan. According to German Cancer Aid, the mechanism of action is unclear and the method's clinical effectiveness unproven.

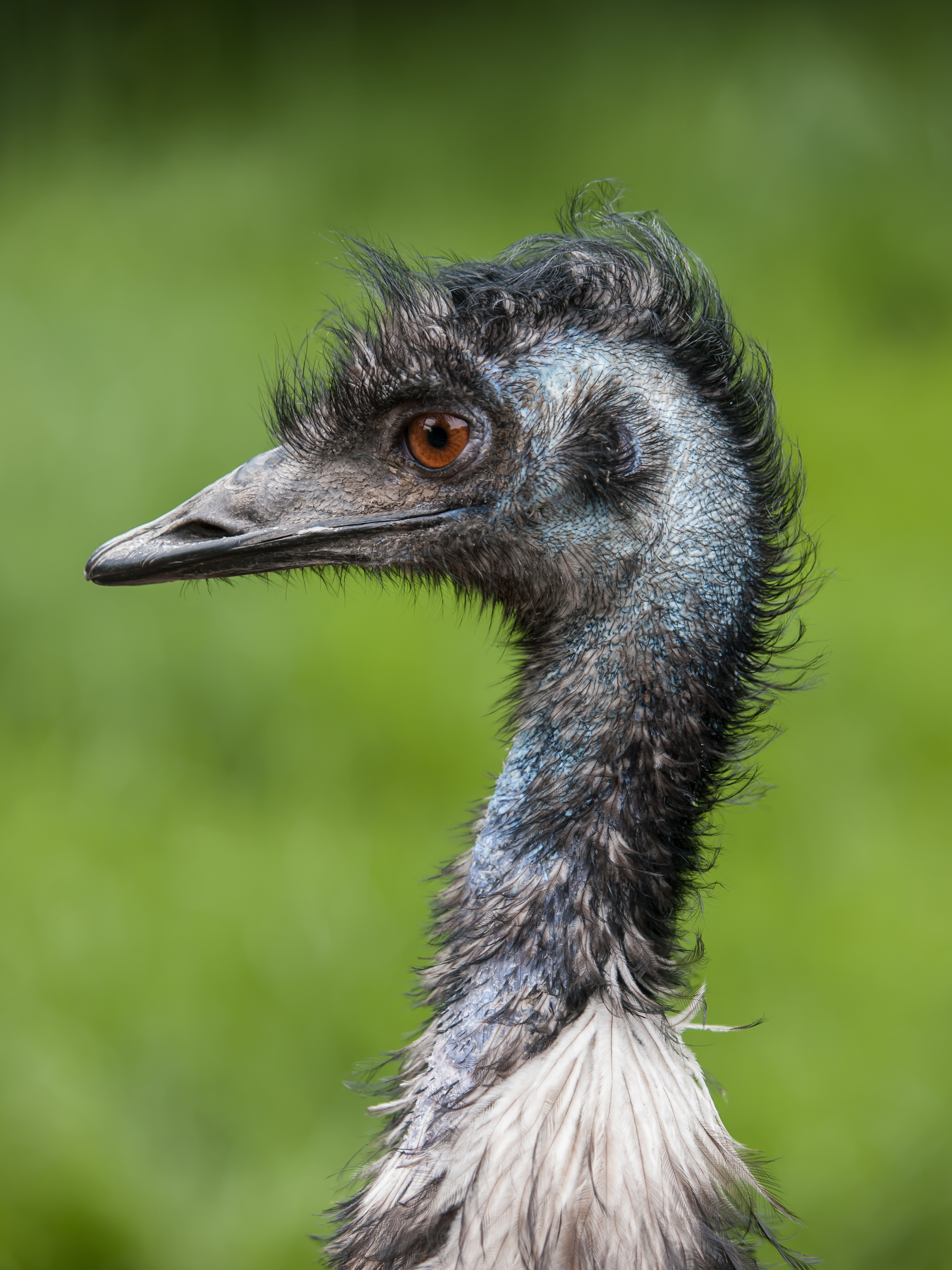
Oil extracted from the fat tissue of the emu has been fraudulently marketed as a cancer treatment

- Colloidal silver – liquid containing a suspension of silver particles, marketed as a treatment for cancer and other ailments. Quackwatch states that colloidal silver dietary supplements have not been found safe or effective for the treatment of any condition. Ingestion of ionic silver can cause a rare condition called argyria in which silver is reduced to elemental form inside tissues, causing an irreversible blue/gray complexion.
- Coral calcium – a dietary supplement supposedly made from crushed coral and promoted with claims it could treat a number of diseases including cancer. A consumer advisory issued by the National Center for Complementary and Alternative Medicine stated "Consumers should be aware that claims that coral calcium can treat or cure cancer, multiple sclerosis, lupus, heart disease, or high blood pressure are not supported by existing scientific evidence".
- DHEA (Dehydroepiandrosterone) – a steroid hormone that has been promoted in supplement form for its claimed cancer prevention properties; there is no scientific evidence to support these claims.
- Di Bella Therapy – a cocktail of vitamins, drugs and hormones devised by Luigi di Bella (1912–2003) and promoted as a cancer treatment. According to the American Cancer Society: "Available scientific evidence does not support claims that Di Bella therapy is effective in treating cancer. It can cause serious and harmful side effects. ... [These] may include nausea, vomiting, diarrhea, increased blood sugar levels, low blood pressure, sleepiness and neurological symptoms."
- Dimethyl sulfoxide (or DMSO) – an organosulfur compound that has been promoted as a treatment for cancer since the 1960s. According to the American Cancer Society, "available scientific evidence does not suggest that DMSO is effective in treating cancer in humans".
- Emu oil – an oil derived from adipose tissue of the emu, and promoted in dietary supplement form with the claimed ability to treat a wide range of diseases, including cancer. These products have been cited by the U.S. Food and Drug Administration as a prime example of a "rip-off".
- Fenbendazole – an antiparasitic drug, has been falsely promoted on social media as a "miracle cure" for cancers, often with the use of florid testimonials.
- Gc-MAF (Gc protein-derived macrophage activating factor) – a type of protein that affects the immune system, and which has been promoted as a "miracle cure" for cancer and HIV. According to Cancer Research UK, "there is no solid scientific evidence to show that the treatment is safe or effective".
- Germanium – a metalloid which has been sold in supplement form with the claim that it is capable of treating leukemia and lung cancer. There is, however, no evidence of benefit, and instead some evidence that such supplements are actively harmful.
- Hydrazine sulfate – a chemical compound promoted (sometimes as "rocket fuel treatment") for its supposed ability to treat cancer. According to Cancer Research UK, although there is some evidence Hydrazine sulfate might help some people with cancer gain weight, "there is no evidence that it helps to treat cancer".

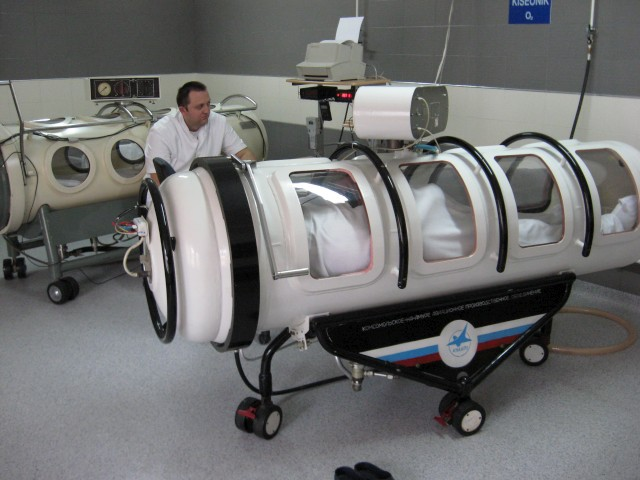
Hyperbaric chamber

- Hyperbaric oxygen therapy – the use of a pressurized oxygen environment as therapy. Hyperbaric oxygen therapy has a number of accepted uses—for example hyperbaric chambers are used for treating decompression sickness. The therapy has also been promoted as a cure-all for a wide range of conditions, including cancer, for which there is no evidence of effectiveness.
- Insulin potentiation therapy – the practice of injecting insulin, usually alongside a low dose of conventional chemotherapy drugs, in the belief that this improves the overall effect of the treatment. Although it may cause a temporary reduction in tumor size for some patients, there is no evidence that it improves survival time or any other main outcomes.
- Krebiozen (also known as Carcalon, creatine, substance X, or drug X) – a mineral oil-based liquid sold as an alternative cancer treatment. According to the American Cancer Society: "Available scientific evidence does not support claims that Krebiozen is effective in treating cancer or any other disease. According to the U.S. Food and Drug Administration (FDA), creatine has been linked to several dangerous side effects."
- Lipoic acid – an antioxidant available as a dietary supplement and claimed by proponents to be capable of slowing cancer progression. According to the American Cancer Society, "there is no reliable scientific evidence at this time that lipoic acid prevents the development or spread of cancer".
- Miracle Mineral Supplement (or MMS) – a toxic solution of 28% sodium chlorite in distilled water, is promoted for treating cancer and other ailments. Quackwatch states, "the product, when used as directed, produces an industrial bleach that can cause serious harm to health".
- Orthomolecular medicine (or Megavitamin therapy) – the use of high doses of vitamins, claimed by proponents to help cure cancer. The view of the medical community is that there is no evidence that these therapies are effective for treating any disease.
- Oxygen therapy – in alternative medicine, the practice of injecting hydrogen peroxide, oxygenating blood, or administering oxygen under pressure to the rectum, vagina, or other bodily opening. According to the American Cancer Society, "available scientific evidence does not support claims that putting oxygen-releasing chemicals into a person's body is effective in treating cancer", and some of these treatments can be dangerous.
- Ozone therapy – the application of ozone to the body, either externally or internally. The United States Food and Drug Administration (FDA) prohibits all medical uses of ozone "in any medical condition for which there is no proof of safety and effectiveness", stating "ozone is a toxic gas with no known useful medical application in specific, adjunctive, or preventive therapy. Ozone therapy has been sold as an unproven treatment for various illnesses, including cancer, a practice which has been characterized as "pure quackery". The therapy can cause serious adverse effects, including death.
- Pangamic acid – a name given to an ill-defined substance peddled by fraudster Ernst T. Krebs, Jr. (1911–1996) with the claim it could cure cancer and various other serious diseases. Sometimes called "vitamin B_{15}", pangamic acid isn't a vitamin and is medically useless.
- Phosphorylethanolamine – A chemical manufactured in Brazil by Gilberto Chierice and distributed with claims it could cure cancer. In 2015, after courts initially upheld people's rights to try phosphorylethanolamine, subsequent opposition from scientific and medical bodies led to a reversal in the law. Subsequent testing has found phosphorylethanolamine to be of no therapeutic benefit.
- Poly-MVA – a dietary supplement created by Merrill Garnett (1931–), a former dentist turned biochemist. Poly-MVA is promoted as a treatment for a number of diseases including HIV/AIDS and cancer, but there is no medical evidence to support such claims and some concern that the use of Poly-MVA can interfere with the functioning of conventional cancer treatments.
- Pregnenolone – a steroid which has been promoted online with claims it can treat a variety of diseases including multiple sclerosis, arthritis and cancer, but such claims are not backed by evidence.
- Protandim – a herbal supplement fraudulently marketed with claims it can cure or prevent a number of serious health conditions, including cancer.
- Quercetin – a plant pigment used in dietary supplements that have been promoted for their ability to prevent and treat cancer; however, according to the American Cancer society, "there is no reliable clinical evidence that quercetin can prevent or treat cancer in humans".
- Revici's Guided Chemotherapy – a practice in which a chemical mixture (usually including lipid alcohol and various metals) is given by mouth or injection, supposedly to cure cancer. The practice was devised by Emanuel Revici (1896–1997) and differs from modern chemotherapy despite being named with the same term. According to the American Cancer Society: "Available scientific evidence does not support claims that Revici's guided chemotherapy is effective in treating cancer or any other disease. It may also cause potentially serious side effects."
- RIGVIR – a virotherapy medication approved by the State Agency of Medicines of the Republic of Latvia. There is no good evidence that RIGVIR is an effective cancer treatment and a number of medical organisations have written to the Latvian government about the dubious science used to promote it. Its promotion has been described as likely being an instance of cancer quackery.

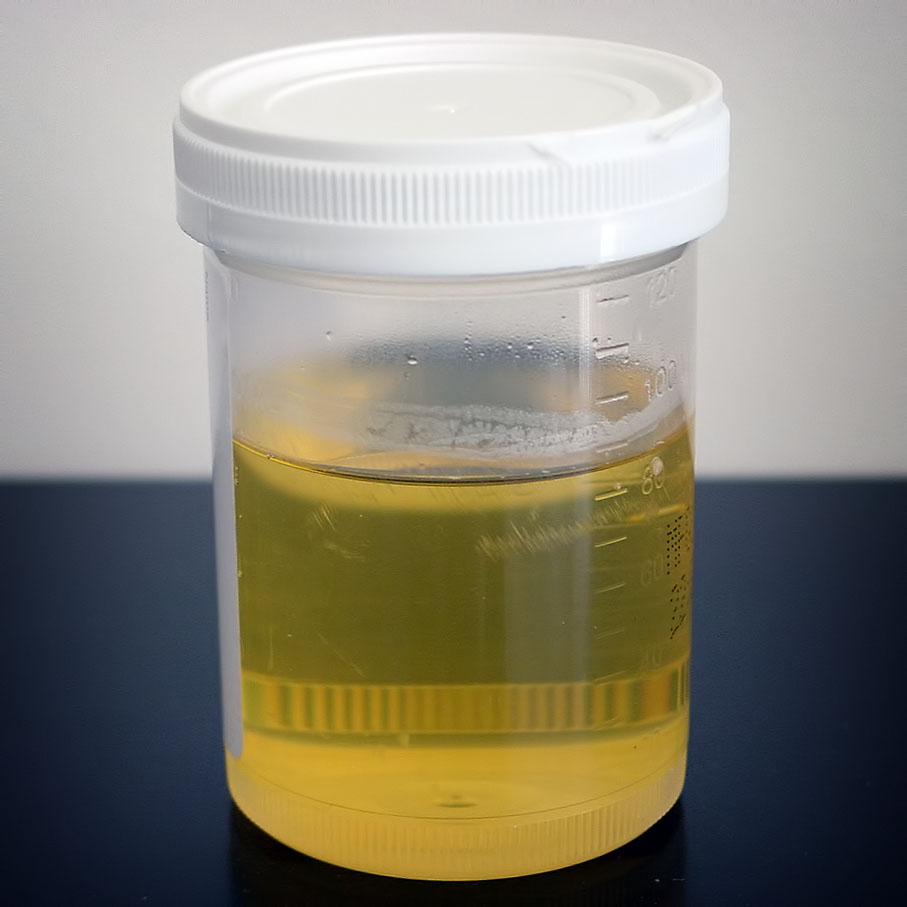
In urine therapy patients attempt to treat cancer by drinking their own urine.

- Shark cartilage – a dietary supplement made from ground shark skeleton, and promoted as a cancer treatment perhaps because of the mistaken notion that sharks do not get cancer. The Mayo Clinic conducted research and were "unable to demonstrate any suggestion of efficacy for this shark cartilage product in patients with advanced cancer".
- Sodium bicarbonate (or baking soda) – the chemical compound with the formula NaHCO_{3}, sometimes promoted as cure for cancer by alternative medical practitioners such as Tullio Simoncini. According to the American Cancer Society: "evidence also does not support the idea that sodium bicarbonate works as a treatment for any form of cancer. There is substantial evidence, however, that these claims are false." Edzard Ernst has called the promotion of sodium bicarbonate as a cancer cure "one of the more sickening alternative cancer scams I have seen for a long time".
- Urine therapy – the practice of attempting to treat cancer—or other illnesses—by drinking, injecting or taking an enema of one's own urine, or by making and taking some derivative substance from it. According to the American Cancer Society, "available scientific evidence does not support claims that urine or urea given in any form is helpful for cancer patients".
- Vitacor – a type of vitamin supplement devised by Matthias Rath and heavily promoted on the internet, alongside other products from Rath's company under the "Cellular Health" brand, as a claimed treatment for cancer and other human disease; these claims have led to Rath's prosecution. According to Cancer Research UK, "there is no scientific evidence at all to back up the claims that these products work".

== See also ==
- List of patent medicines
- List of topics characterized as pseudoscience
