= Hidvégi =

Hidvégi is a Hungarian surname. Notable people with the surname include:

- László Hidvégi (1916–2003), Hungarian diver
- Máté Hidvégi (born 1955), Hungarian biochemist
- Sándor Hidvégi (born 1983), Hungarian footballer
