= Luigi di Bella =

Italian physiologist and writer (1912–2003)

Luigi Di Bella
- Born: 17 July 1912; Linguaglossa, Italy
- Died: 1 July 2003 (aged 90); Modena, Italy
- Occupations: Physiologist, writer
- Known for: Metodo Di bella

Academic background
- Education: University of Bari
- Website: www.metododibella.org/it

Luigi di Bella (17 July 1912 in Linguaglossa – 1 July 2003 in Modena) was an Italian medical doctor and physiology professor. In the late 1980s, he created a disproven cancer treatment known as "Di Bella therapy" that precipitated an international controversy.

Studies demonstrated that Di Bella's therapy for cancer is totally ineffective. Medical experts consider his cancer therapy dangerous and unscientific.

== Education ==
Di Bella graduated in medicine at Bari University, and worked as an army doctor in Greece (1941–1943). In 1948, he became a professor of physiology at the University of Modena, where he had been working since 1939.

== Studies ==
In 1963 Di Bella began his studies about some types of blood cancer. During the late 1980s, Di Bella developed a cocktail of drugs, vitamins and hormones (Melatonin, ACTH and Somatostatin) which he argued would be useful in fighting cancer. Following national exposure in 1997 and 1998, several cancer patients from around Italy traveled to his clinic seeking access to his "miracle cure". In 1998 Italian medical authorities (Ministero della salute), declared his treatment to be without scientific merit. The final rejection of Di Bella's method was expressed in a letter (written on 30 December 2005) by the chairman of the Board of Health, Mario Condorelli, to Health Minister Francesco Storace: "The working group of the Board of Health considers that it has no evidence of the effectiveness of "multitherapy Di Bella" and therefore does not recommend a new clinical trial; this could be not only ineffective but also harmful to the patients by denying them (or procrastinating) access to anti-cancer drugs of proven effectiveness."

According to the American Cancer Society: "Available scientific evidence does not support claims that Di Bella therapy is effective in treating cancer. It can cause serious and harmful side effects. ... [These] may include nausea, vomiting, diarrhea, increased blood sugar levels, low blood pressure, sleepiness, and neurological symptoms."

Physician Silvio Garattini described Di Bella's therapy for cancer as a "totally irrational association of drugs supported by absolutely no scientific evidence or data whatsoever."
