= Rudolf Breuss =

Austrian naturopath and alternative cancer treatment advocate

- Born: June 6, 1899
- Died: May 17, 1990 (aged 90)
- Occupations: Naturopath, writer

Rudolf Breuss (June 6, 1899 – May 17, 1990) was an Austrian naturopath and alternative cancer treatment advocate. He promoted the Breuss Cancer Cure (BCC) - a 42-day juice fasting program, widely regarded by medical experts as lacking any scientific basis, and which medical sources have criticized as ineffective and dangerous.

== Biography ==
Breuss maintained that cancer lives on solid foods taken into the body, and that cancerous growths will die if a patient drinks only vegetable juices and herbal teas for 42 days. The Breuss Cancer Cure (BCC) claims to starve cancer cells by not providing solid food proteins, the idea being based on an erroneous assumption that cancer cells can only live on proteins of solid food. The BCC is based on a vegetable juice that consists of 55% red beet root, 20% carrots, 20% celery root, 3% raw potato, and 2% radishes.

Breuss stated that more than 45,000 people were cured following his treatment. He wrote a book titled The Breuss Cancer Cure: Advice for the Prevention and Natural Treatment of Cancer, Leukemia and Other Seemingly Incurable Diseases; according to a 1995 English translation, Cancer Cure has been translated into seven languages and has sold more than 1 million copies.

== Reception ==
Edzard Ernst has written that the Breuss Cancer Cure is not supported by scientific evidence and its assumptions lack biological plausibility. He also noted that, as the diet carries the risk of malnutrition and shuns conventional cancer treatments, it is potentially dangerous.

A senior nurse for Cancer Research UK stated that they did not support alternative therapies that were not backed by scientific evidence, and that following a restricted diet such as Breuss's could cause malnutrition.

A 2012 review of cancer diets named the Breuss diet as one of the most frequently mentioned, but cautioned there is no evidence to support taking these "cancer diets" and that they can be harmful. A 2014 review of cancer diets listed the Breuss diet as having no benefit and the underlying hypothesis is not compatible with scientific concepts of cancer.

In 2020, the Cancer Association of South Africa has stated that, even though a diet based on vegetables is healthy, the Breuss diet "contains no known substances that can ‘cure’ cancer".

== Selected publications ==
- Rudolf Breuss (1 January 1995). The Breuss Cancer Cure: Advice for the Prevention and Natural Treatment of Cancer, Leukemia and Other Seemingly Incurable Diseases. Alive Books. ISBN 978-0-920470-56-5.

== See also ==
- List of ineffective cancer treatments
