= Zoetron therapy =

Ineffective cancer treatment

Zoetron therapy is an ineffective cancer treatment based on a large doughnut-shaped electromagnetic device (the "Zoetron machine").

The device was marketed by the CSCT company (standing for "Cell Specific Cancer Treatment", an alternative name for the therapy). It was claimed to detect cancer, and to "destroy cancer cells without harming adjacent normal cells". The promotion of the machine was backed by the publication of a number of misleading case reports.

In 2003 the U.S. Federal Trade Commission took action against CSCT in coordination with the Canadian and Mexican authorities, alleging that the company had been falsely promoting its device as a cancer treatment online, and charging for its use in cancer clinics in Tijuana, Mexico. In 2005 criminal charges were bought against the company's officers for making false or misleading claims about the worth of the Zoetron machine.

Patients being treated with the machine had been asked to pay up to US$15,000 in advance, however the treatment had no therapeutic value: on inspection the device was found to consist of weak magnets that could have no effect on cancer. Quackwatch states: "There is no scientific evidence or reason to believe that exposure to weak magnetic fields will kill any cells or that cancer cells accumulate iron or respond differently than normal cells to a magnetic field."

== See also ==
- List of ineffective cancer treatments
