= Johanna Budwig =

German biochemist

- Born: 1908; Essen
- Died: 2003; Freudenstadt
- Scientific career
- Fields: Biochemistry

Johanna Budwig (1908 – 2003) was a German biochemist, alternative cancer treatment advocate and writer. Budwig was a pharmacist and held doctorate degrees in physics and chemistry. Based on her research on fatty acids she developed a lacto-vegetarian diet that she believed was useful in the treatment of cancer. There is no clinical evidence that the Budwig diet is effective, and it may cause adverse effects.

== Biography ==
Budwig was born in Essen and at the age of 16 joined the Kaiserswerth Deaconess Institute. She studied pharmacy in Königsberg and Münster where she met her mentor Prof. Hans Kaufmann the founder of the German Institute for Fat Research. She worked under Kaufmann as a research assistant and completed her doctorate in 1939.

While working as a researcher at the German Federal Health Office, she noted that many cancer drugs being evaluated in the 1950s contained sulphydryl groups. Budwig believed that sulphydryl compounds were important to cellular metabolism and cellular respiration. She researched the theory that a low oxygen environment would develop in the absence of sulphydryl groups and/or fatty acid partners that would encourage the proliferation of cancerous cells. With Kaufmann, she developed paper chromatography techniques to identify and quantify fatty acids. Budwig used these techniques to compare the fatty acid profiles of sick and healthy individuals. In 1950, Budwig and Kaufmann presented their findings at the International Fat Congress on "New approaches in fat analysis". She argued that highly heated and chemically modified fats found primarily in margarine were dangerous to human health. In 1951, Budwig was chief expert for pharmaceuticals and fats in the Federal Institute for Fat Research but resigned over controversy due to her critical statements about trans fatty acids.

Budwig came to the conclusion that industrial processed fats were a strain on health and caused cardiovascular disease and cancer, whilst polyunsaturated fatty acids were protective. She argued that linseed oil which contains alpha-Linolenic acid, an essential omega-3 fatty acid and sulphur proteins in the form of low-fat quark or cottage cheese are a great importance in the diet. She became known for her "Budwig Creme", for which linseed oil, milk and low-fat quark are stirred together until no oil is left.

Budwig died in Freudenstadt in 2003, at the age of 94, as a result of a femoral neck fracture.

== The Budwig Diet ==
In 1952, she described a diet which she claimed had anti-cancer effects. She called it the “Budwig protocol”. The focus of this diet is on modifying the intake of dietary fats. It is a lacto-vegetarian diet rich in flaxseed oil and other cold-pressed vegetable oils, mixed with cottage cheese and meals high in fruits, vegetables with sauerkraut, freshly squeezed juices, nuts and seeds. The diet avoids animal fats, butter, margarine, meat, seafood and sugar. She recommended the consumption of garlic, leeks or onions as these plants contain proteins with sulphur content. Her dietary ideas inspired the research of Catherine Kousmine.

There is no clinical evidence supporting the claims of the Budwig diet against cancer. Adverse effects of the diet have included malnutrition, stomach ache, flatulence, and allergic reactions.

People with cancer who delay or forgo effective treatments as a result of using diets such as the Budwig Diet might suffer relapse, experience unnecessary disease progression, and experience continuing cancer-related symptoms.

== Selected publications ==
- Flax Oil as a True Aid against Arthritis, Heart Infarction and Cancer (1994)
- The Oil Protein Diet Cookbook (2006)

== See also ==
- List of unproven and disproven cancer treatments
- Quackery
