= 714-X =

Fraudulent alternative medical treatment

Combination of
- water: 94%
- camphor: less than 0.01%

Clinical data
- Other names: trimethylbicyclonitramineoheptane chloride
- Routes of administration: injected, inhaled

Legal status
- Legal status: CA: ℞-only; US: Banned by FDA

714-X, also referred to as 714X or trimethylbicyclonitramineoheptane chloride, is a mixture of substances manufactured by CERBE Distribution Inc and sold as an alternative medical treatment which is claimed to cure cancer, multiple sclerosis, fibromyalgia and other diseases. There is no scientific evidence that 714-X is effective in treating any kind of cancer, and its marketing is considered health fraud in the US.

== History ==
714-X was developed by Gaston Naessens, a native of France who was tried there for practicing medicine without a license. Naessens moved to Quebec and continued his research from the early 1970s. In 1989 he was arrested but acquitted from charges of accessory to murder, after a cancer patient using 714-X died following refusal to take conventional medical treatment.

The name "714-X" was chosen by Naessens to symbolize his initials (the 7th and 14th letters of the alphabet) and the year of his birth (1924, as X is the 24th letter). The marketers claim that 714-X works by counteracting the harm done by "somatids", a purported life form which is not bacterial, viral, or fungal, but which instead belongs to a distinct domain unknown to science and medicine.

Sales of 714-X have been banned in the US by the Food and Drug Administration, and in 1996 Charles Pixley was tried and jailed for advocating for it and distributing it. During proceedings Pixley claimed it was the re-branding of a homeopathic beverage, known prior to the establishment of the FDA; however, Naessens later said that it was completely different and has nothing to do with homeopathy.

== Composition ==
714-X is advertised as containing camphor combined with excess nitrogen, ammonium salts, sodium chloride, and ethanol. An analysis by the Food and Drug Administration (FDA) found that 714-X was 94% water, with small amounts of the other salts and less than 0.01% camphor.

== Administration ==
714-X is typically injected into the lymphatic system through the groin. Alternatively, it may be inhaled via a nebulizer.

== Safety and effectiveness ==
No studies have been published on the safety or efficacy of 714-X in humans, and the few available animal studies have shown no beneficial effect. The American Cancer Society has stated: "There is no scientific evidence that 714-X is effective in treating any type of cancer or any other illness."

== Legal issues ==
The FDA has banned both import and sale of 714-X as health fraud, and at least one prison sentence has been handed down for importing it into America.

714-X is manufactured in Canada, where it is legal to purchase for personal use through a physician under the Special Access Programme of Health Canada, a law which provides access to non-marketed treatments for terminal illnesses when no marketed alternative exists. However, in October 2004, Health Canada told the manufacturer to remove all references to the compound from its website. On July 28, 2006, Justice François Lemieux of the Federal Court of Canada granted a request for judicial review undertaken by a group of 714-X patients. The judgment voided Health Canada's policy statement and restored access to 714-X under the Special Access Programme under certain conditions.

== See also ==
- List of ineffective cancer treatments
