= Wilburn Ferguson =

American alternative medicine researcher

Wilburn H. Ferguson
- Born: 1905; Shawnee, Oklahoma
- Died: 1998 (aged 92–93)
- Education: University of Cuenca (honorary doctorate claimed)
- Occupations: Alternative-medicine practitioner and researcher, nurse, missionary, professor of anesthesiology
- Known for: Claiming to find a cure for cancer
- Notable work: The Son of Fergus, Tsanza

Wilburn H. Ferguson was an American alternative-medicine practitioner, nurse, and Seventh-day Adventist missionary. He is best known for his claims to have found a cure for cancer from the substance used by the Shuar ethnic group of Ecuador in their traditional practice of headhunting. However, mainstream scientific institutions have never verified his claims about the substance's supposed curative properties, and it has not been developed into any contemporary medical treatment.

== Personal life ==
Ferguson was born in 1905 in Shawnee, Oklahoma and raised in National City, California. During his childhood, he became a member of the Seventh-day Adventist Church.

In May 1930, he married his wife Ruth Ferguson, a nurse. In 1931, he moved to Peru to work at an Adventist mission in Sandia Province. He was later removed from his job as a missionary because of concerns that he was insufficiently engaged with spiritual concerns.

His children were Eugene (Gene), Donald, Ralph, and Eileen Patricia (Patricia). Patricia later married his assistant Nicanor (Nico) Sangurima.

When not engaged in research concerning his purported cure for cancer, Ferguson often worked as a nurse. During the 1940s, the Fergusons ran nursing homes.

The U.S. Embassy in Ecuador reportedly looked into why Ferguson, as an American citizen, was supporting sending Carlos Egas Llaguno, an Ecuadorian communist, to the United States for him to receive police training.

== Education ==
Ferguson controversially described himself as a doctor, despite only having an honorary degree from the University of Cuenca and not having completed an associate degree. He had earlier attended colleges affiliated with the Seventh-Day Adventist religious movement. Ferguson claimed to have later studied anesthesiology with the Chicago anesthesiologist Dr. Ben Morgan.

== Research with the Shuar ==
Even before his time as a missionary, Ferguson had had a longstanding desire to work exploring remote regions of the world for medical plants, a practice that would develop into the fields of ethnobotany and ethnomedicine. When in Peru as a missionary, he learned about the Shuar practice of shrinking heads. He hypothesized that whatever practice could be used to produce shrunken heads could also be used to cure cancer tumors. His initial attempt to contact the Shuar, whom he referred to as the Jivaros, to learn more about this practice reportedly ended in disaster when many of the men accompanying him and a child working as Ferguson's assistant went missing and were thought to have been killed by the Shuar.

Ferguson's next attempt to learn more about the way in which the Shuar shrunk heads came courtesy of his association with Ecuadorian president Galo Plaza. Plaza had gotten him and his wife Ruth a number of medical positions in Ecuador, which gave him government support in his attempts to find the Shuar. According to Ferguson, on a trip into Shuar territory he was able to convince a Shuar person whom he had healed using Western medical techniques to provide him with a pot of extract reportedly used for shrinking heads.

After another trip treating the Shuar during a typhoid fever epidemic, he reportedly got to know a Shuar medicine man by the name of Tangamasha. Eventually the Shuar elders apparently gave Tangamasha permission to teach Ferguson how to make the substance and how to use it to shrink a monkey's head. He reported that the substance used about 30 plants, including cinchona, a plant that already had medical uses since it was the source of the antimalarial quinine. Tests by Ferguson, however, led him to conclude that many of the plants were not necessary and that he could achieve the same effects using only 8. Later, a step in which the substance was used to shrink a cow's head was added.

== Testing of the substance ==
Ferguson's first tests occurred on guinea pigs and human tissue samples, which he considered to demonstrate that it successfully shrank tissue. He then used the substance on his human patients without informing them of what he was doing or the risks inherent in being treated with an essentially unstudied compound. According to him, the substance was highly successful in curing patients of tumors, although there are no reliable sources validating that claim.

Later tests at the University of Cuenca using the substance from Tangamasha were reportedly successful initially, but the tumors began to return when a less effective batch of the solution was used. Ferguson began to first use the substance to shrink a cow's head as a result of those tests, which apparently made the substance more effective. In the end, many of the patients apparently went home believing themselves to have been cured of cancer. Ferguson later moved with his family to Los Angeles, where he used a laboratory at Los Angeles County General Hospital to carry out further tests as to how and why the substance worked. There, the substance was referred to as "head-shrinking compound 101-A". His major goal during this time period was to further isolate which components of the substance actually worked and what each did using fractional distillation. Reportedly, the experiments were fairly successful in showing that the compound could be very effective under laboratory conditions.

Both Merck and the National Cancer Institute apparently looked into Ferguson's solution to determine whether it was worth funding. The National Cancer Institute concluded that the solution did shrink tumors, but that the patients still had cancer. Early results of the testing with Merck were, according to Ferguson, mixed, which he suspected was due to contamination in later batches of the solution. He was subsequently apparently not able to produce enough of the solution in the way he was accustomed to, with fresh plants, and so ended up giving them a solution made from dried plants, which he blamed for the subsequent lack of further funding and the inability of Merck to determine the chemical components of the solution.

Ferguson subsequently returned to Ecuador, to the town of Sucúa near the traditional territory of the Shuar people to carry out further research into how his substance worked. Because of this research, he stopped tempering the solution with a cow's head and reduced the number of plants in the mixture to seven. During this time period, Ferguson also helped to market Sucúa to tourists and demonstrated elements of how heads were shrunk to tourists.

After that, he moved back to California and began working on further testing of the substance at an organization called the World Life Research Institute, run by a scientist named Bruce Halstead. He then moved to Texas to continue his research. In Texas, he hired additional chemists to help him determine what, exactly, was the active ingredient in the solution and how to put it to best use. However, during this time period, Food and Drug Administration regulations prevented him from using the substance to treat any patients. Consequently, he began treating patients for free in areas of Mexico, particularly Torreón. During this time, William Aikin, a doctor who was working with him on figuring out how to use the solution best, tried to convince him to pair it with surgery, but Ferguson refused.

== Funding and commercialization ==
Ferguson's first attempts to gain funding for further research into his ideas about cancer treatment were mostly from the Ecuadorian government under Galo Plaza. On a trip to the United States supported by the Ecuadorian government, Ferguson held a press conference and tried to get support for his ideas from Dwight D. Eisenhower and from the Rockefeller family, but neither gave him his support. He later discussed setting up a center at the University of Texas at Austin to pursue his research further and expand it into looking for other medicinal plants, but the center never materialized due to a failure to secure any funding for it. Support from the Ecuadorian government later led to the production of a film about his quest, called "The Jivaro and his Drugs".

A later attempt to secure funding from the British government was unsuccessful, after a committee that was reviewing his application for funding concluded that he was only treating secondary infections rather than the cancers themselves. His work in Los Angeles was funded by a private benefactor, but he was turned down in his attempts to get a grant from the National Cancer Institute.

An appearance on the radio program hosted by Drew Pearson led him to receive requests from around the nation for his unproven treatment. During this time, Ferguson was located in Guayaquil, Ecuador, where at least one patient from the United States showed up hoping to be cured of cancer. The patient reportedly reported improvement but still died shortly thereafter. Subsequently, he was contacted by Merck and the National Cancer Institute, but after the failure of those tests he also lost much of his Ecuadorian support after the administration of Galo Plaza left government.

After Bourke B. Hickenlooper toured Ferguson's lab in Sucúa, he attempted to help him get funding by setting up the Ferguson Research Foundation but was ultimately unsuccessful. However, support from the foundation enabled him to set up a lab at San Antonio Commercial College with the support of its dean, Ken Williams. Williams and Ferguson later set up a for-profit corporation named Farma Corporation, which sold shares to raise money. However, Farma Corporation later dissolved after it was discovered that it was failing to register many of the shares that it was selling with the Texas State Securities Board. This led to the collapse of Ferguson's partnership with Williams and an end to his research on the solution.

== Copyright infringement dispute ==
In 1992, Ferguson and composer Phillip Lambro sued Sean Connery, Tom Schulman, and Creative Artists Agency for copyright infringement concerning the recently released film Medicine Man. Lambro had bought the rights to Ferguson's story, which he had looked to sell to a Hollywood movie studio under the name of Tsanza. This text's relation to Ferguson's autobiography The Son of Fergus is not clear.

Ferguson and Lambro sought damages of roughly $100 million from five defendants involved in the making of Medicine Man. Their case cited that both the film and the proposed film take place in the Amazon, feature a doctor looking for a cure for cancer who develops a relationship with local indigenous people, including healing a boy, and describe the doctor's search for further funding and the destruction of the doctor's laboratory. Lambro claimed that he had extensively discussed the sale of Tsanza to Creative Artists Agency and offered a letter from secretary Alison Claire-Genis discussing the book as proof of that. Ferguson and Lambro eventually lost this case because Tom Schulman was able to demonstrate that the story of Medicine Man was instead based on his longstanding friendship with the conservationist Daniel Janzen.

== Legacy ==
Ferguson later reportedly tasked an entrepreneur named Charles Mazinter with trying to find other partners to develop the solution into an accepted medical treatment, as Ferguson was now too old to do that himself. Mazinter reportedly contacted a corporation called ILEX that was trying to develop cancer drugs and discussed a deal, but the two parties were never able to reach one; the exact circumstances are still disputed. Further analysis by Mazinter and Ferguson's son-in-law Nico Sangurima has apparently hinted at a specific plant in Ecuador being the key to the solution, but the name of that plant has not yet been publicly revealed. There are no known current trials going on to further analyze Ferguson's solution.

== See also ==
- List of unproven and disproven cancer treatments
- Shrunken head
