= Desiré Dubounet =

American alternative medicine inventor and filmmaker (1951–2025)

Desiré D. Dubounet
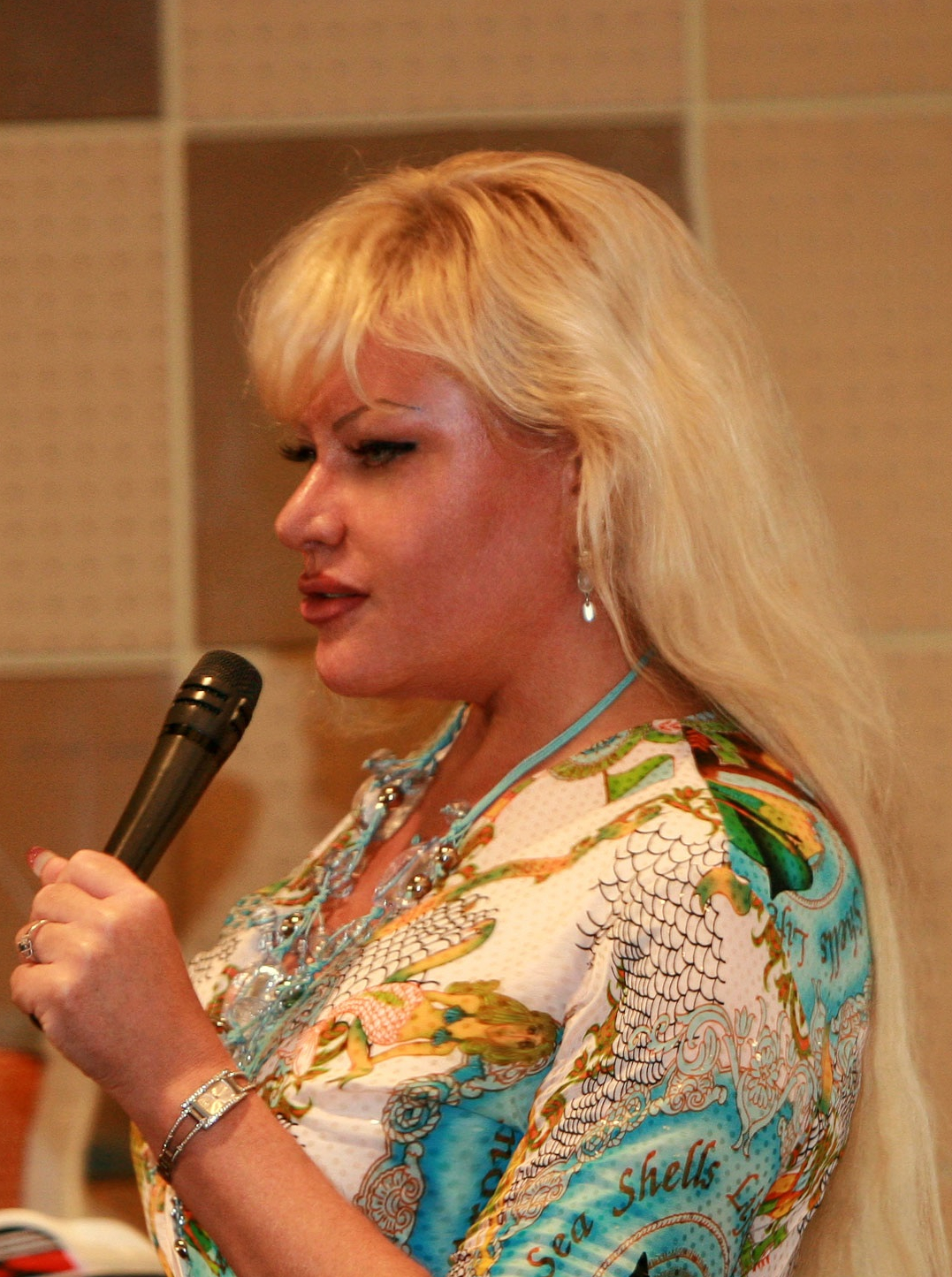
- Dubounet in 2010
- Born: William Charles Nelson; 19 June 1951; Warren, Ohio, U.S.
- Died: 26 December 2025 (aged 74)
- Citizenship: American
- Education: Youngstown State University; Southeastern Louisiana University
- Known for: Designing and selling Radionics devices
- Scientific career
- Fields: Radionics

Desiré D. Dubounet (born William Charles Nelson; 19 June 1951 – 26 December 2025) was an American alternative medicine inventor, filmmaker and performer who lived in Budapest, Hungary. Dubounet developed the pseudoscientific Electro Physiological Feedback Xrroid, an energy medicine device that is considered to be dangerous to health and has been described as a scam.

== Life and career ==
Dubounet was born in Warren, Ohio, on 19 June 1951. She developed the pseudoscientific EPFX device in the late 1980s which supposedly claimed could diagnose and eliminate diseases including AIDS and cancer. The EPFX device is described as balancing "bio-energetic" forces; bio-energetic forces do not exist. Some people died after using the EPFX system instead of seeking or continuing medical care.

In 1992 the United States Food and Drug Administration ordered Dubounet to stop claiming that the EPFX could diagnose or cure diseases, but she did not; in 1996 she was indicted on nine counts of felony fraud, though none were in relation to the EPFX. Dubounet later left the United States. Dubounet was also involved in homeopathic medicine; she received a patent for a process for manufacturing homeopathic "remedies" in 1997. At least 10,000 EPFX devices have been sold in the United States.

She lived in Budapest, and performed at the nightclub Bohemian Alibi. and produced and starred in the English-Hungarian comedy The Story of F***. Dubounet also directed the erotic comedy Paprika Western.

Dubounet died on 26 December 2025, at the age of 74.
