= Virginia Livingston =

American physician

- Born: 1906; Meadville, Pennsylvania, United States
- Died: June 30, 1990 (aged 83–84)
- Scientific career
- Fields: Cancer

Virginia Livingston (1906–1990) was an American physician and cancer researcher who advocated the unsupported theory that a specific species of bacteria she named Progenitor cryptocides was the primary cause of cancer in humans. Her theories about P. cryptocides have not been duplicated by researchers, and a clinical trial of her therapy did not show any efficacy in the treatment of cancer. The American Cancer Society, which did not support Livingston's treatment protocol for cancer, categorically denied her theory of cancer origins.

== Life ==
Virginia Livingston was born Virginia Wuerthele in Meadville, Pennsylvania in 1906.

Both her father and grandfather were physicians and she also pursued a degree in medicine. Prior to attending medical school, Livingston earned three AB degrees in English, history, and economics from Vassar College. She then attended New York University, Bellevue Medical College and in 1936, received her degree in medicine. She was one of four women in her graduating class.

Shortly after graduation, Livingston became the first female resident physician at a New York hospital where she was assigned to treat prostitutes infected with venereal diseases. While there, Livingston became interested in the study of tuberculosis and leprosy, and later scleroderma, a disease affecting the tissues and skin. After studying scleroderma tissues with the darkfield microscope, she claimed to find an acid-fast organism that consistently appeared in her slides. Thinking that scleroderma had some characteristics that were like cancer, Livingston then began studying malignant tissues and subsequently claimed to find evidence of acid-fast organisms in every sample. It was this early research that prompted the young physician to devote her career to the study of a specific microorganism involved in cancer.

== Early research ==
In 1946, Livingston published a paper in which she stated she had established that a bacterium was a causative agent in scleroderma. In 1947, she cultured a mycobacteria-like organism in human cancer and, according to her peer-reviewed paper, fulfilled Koch's postulates establishing an apparent cause and effect. In 1949, Livingston was named chief of the Rutgers-Presbyterian Hospital Laboratory for Proliferative Diseases in New Jersey where she continued her cancer research. It was during this time that Livingston formed a lifetime association with Dr. Eleanor Alexander-Jackson of Cornell University. Jackson's specialty was the study of mycobacteria and particularly, the species responsible for tuberculosis. Jackson had developed specific culture media for growing the microbe and a technique for observing it known as the "triple stain" because she felt this microbe wasn't amenable to conventional modes of culturing and microscopy.

Livingston and Jackson also collaborated on work on the Rous sarcoma virus (RSV) at Lederle Laboratories. Livingston claimed that when RSV cultures were passed through special filters designed to hold back all but the smallest virus particles, she was able to grow bacteria; this was considered a controversial claim since bacteria are considerably larger than viruses and should not exist in filtered RSV serum. After healthy animals were exposed to the Rous bacterial filtrates, Livingston and Jackson claimed that cancerous lesions developed. This finding led to speculation that such bacteria could be transmitted from poultry to humans and this became a primary reason Livingston ordered her cancer patients to not eat poultry while they underwent her treatment. Scientists have since rejected Livingston's findings, arguing there is no evidence supporting her claim.

In 1956, Livingston published a paper suggesting a causative bacterium in Wilson's disease. In 1965, she reported isolation of a variably acid-fast mycobacterium in patients with myocardial vascular disease. During this time, she also began a small test trial of anti-bacterial vaccines made from the body fluids of cancer patients and reported moderate success. Between the years 1965-1968, Livingston received Fleet Foundation and Kerr Grants, and continued her investigation into a bacterial cause of human cancer. She also published a paper describing the presence of a substance identified as Actinomycin-D which she said could damage chromosomes and promote cancer.

In 1969, Livingston and her husband Afton Munk Livingston, established the Livingston-Wheeler Clinic in San Diego, California, and began formally treating cancer patients. The therapeutic program included autogenous vaccine made from killed bacteria derived from body fluids; a low sodium diet consisting of organic foods, fruits and vegetables high in a substance Livingston called "abscisic acid"; immune enhancing vaccines (gamma globulin, BCG) and antibiotics. Livingston prescribed antibiotics after cross testing them with patients' cultures to see which had the most antibacterial activity. Livingston also recommended that patients not consume poultry products based on her earlier research.

After her husband's death, she married Owen Webster Wheeler, one of the first patients she claims to have successfully treated for head and neck cancer. Shortly after, the clinic was renamed the Livingston-Wheeler clinic. In 1970, Livingston officially named her cancer organism Progenitor cryptocides, and presented her findings to the New York Academy of Sciences. According to her biography, Progenitor was a pseudonym meaning "ancestral" and the name was chosen because Livingston believed the microbe existed as early as the Precambrian era, and it was an endogenous component of life itself. The name "cryptocides" was a Greek and Latin word which meant "hidden killer". The microbe was classified under the order Actinomycetales. Livingston described Progenitor as an intermittently acid-fast mycobacterium that displayed highly variable growth cycles. According to Livingston the microbe was pleomorphic, and had cell wall-deficient and filter-passing forms resembling viruses, with the ability to adopt a variety of shapes including spindles, rods and cocci.

== 1974-1990 ==
In 1974, Livingston published a paper which described her isolation of human chorionic gonadotropin (hCG) from cancer bacteria. She then advanced one of her central hypotheses.

Livingston theorized that hCG is both a component of human cancer, but also innately involved in embryonic growth and fetal survival. She wrote that hCG is saturated in the placenta, and blocks the mothers’ antibodies from attacking the fetus, partly made of foreign DNA (and not recognized by host immunity). By the same token, hCG performs a similar function in cancer, conferring protection to malignant tissues. Livingston believed that after Progenitor hybridizes with cancer cells, it imparts an ability for them to produce hCG in a manner similar to that of the developing fetus. Based on this duality of function, Livingston called hCG “the hormone of life and the hormone of death”. She also stipulated that vaccines which target hCG-producing bacteria could also halt the progression of cancer. And she claimed that abscisic acid could also neutralize hCG.

== Controversy ==
Though some bacteria have been associated with cancer (for instance H. pylori has been associated with stomach cancer) Livingston's postulated relationship between cancer and P. cryptocides was never proven in several follow up studies conducted by independent investigators. Researchers confirmed that bacteria provided by Livingston produced hCG, but several other studies demonstrated that numerous bacteria in both cancer patients and healthy individuals also produced the substance.

Occurring before the existence of techniques to analyze DNA, Livingston and other investigators' ability to differentiate bacteria based on morphology and chemical characteristics was limited. However, even given technological limitations at the time, Livingston's classification methods were described as full of "remarkable errors", attributing characteristics to Actinomycetales (the order Livingston believed P. cryptocides belonged to) shared by no other members of the order. Some evidence supports P. cryptocides is the result of a mistaken identification of a Staphylococcus strain of bacteria and later studies of the samples provided by Livingston proved to be Staphylococcus epidermidis and Streptococcus faecalis.

The American Cancer Society (ACS) did not support Livingston's treatment protocol for cancer, and has categorically denied her theory of the cancer bacterium P. cryptocides the primary cause of human cancer. The ACS also challenged the efficacy of Livingston's autogenous vaccine and concluded in its report that there was no corroboration of either P. cryptocides or the efficacy of her autologous vaccine. Since Livingston hadn't stocked earlier cultures of her alleged microbe, it is not possible to decipher precisely what those cultures contained.

== Clinical testing ==
A case-control study using self-selected, matched but not randomized groups with late stage cancer compared survival and quality of life between cancer patients receiving conventional treatment and those undergoing the Livingston-Wheeler therapy. The results were reported in The New England Journal of Medicine in 1991, and found no differences in survival among patients whether treated conventionally, or via Livingston's treatment. The NEJM report also stated that when comparing the two groups, the "quality of life were consistently better among conventionally treated patients from enrollment on". Based on this trial, the ACS deemed Livingston's cancer therapy without efficacy, and considered it an "unproven therapy".

While both groups of patients in the trial deteriorated at equal rates, patients in the Livingston-treated group were reported to have had a "poorer quality of life" at the start of the trial. The study's lead investigator, Barrie Cassileth, acknowledged that "the University of Pennsylvania patients had a significantly better quality of life at all times, including enrollment" and that, quality of life "was different at base line", with Livingston's patients rated worse. Patients in both treatment arms also received conventional therapies in addition to Livingston's therapy. Livingston's patients also received BCG during the trial---an FDA-approved cancer adjuvant which has been found effective for several cancers, including those of the bladder and colon.

At the study's conclusion, Barrie Cassileth commented:

"This study...involved only patients with diagnoses and stages of disease for which there is no effective conventional treatment. Therefore, the results cannot be generalized to patients with less advanced stages of disease or to other treatment regimens." Cassileth also said, her study group "hypothesized that survival time would not differ between the two groups on the basis of the assumption that the unproved remedy would be no more effective with end-stage disease than conventional care, itself largely ineffective".

== Death ==
Shortly after speaking before an Office of Technology Assessment (OTA) hearing on alternative cancer therapies and attending her 60th reunion at Vassar College in 1990, Livingston accompanied her daughter Julie Anne Wagner on a European trip. She developed chest pains while visiting the Greek islands and then succumbed to heart failure in Athens on June 30, before being transported to a Paris Hospital.

== See also ==
- Cancer bacteria
- Infectious causes of cancer
- List of ineffective cancer treatments
