= Essiac =

Herbal tea and ineffective cancer treatment

Alternative medicine
- Claims: Treatment of cancer and other illnesses.
- Related fields: Alternative medicine
- Year proposed: approx 1920
- Original proponents: Rene Caisse
- Subsequent proponents: Essiac Products Inc.
- MeSH: C111756
- See also: List of questionable cancer treatments

Essiac is a herbal tea promoted as an alternative treatment for cancer and other illnesses. There is no evidence it is beneficial to health. In a number of studies Essiac either showed no action against cancer cells, or actually increased the rate of cancer growth.

== Background ==
While the formulations can vary, most Essiac formulations contain burdock root, turkey rhubarb root, sheep sorrel and slippery elm. From the 1920s through the 1970s, Essiac was promoted as a cancer treatment by Rene Caisse, a Canadian nurse who invented the formula. Caisse claimed at some times that the formula had been given to her by an Ontario Ojibwa patient she treated, and at other times that she had learned the formula from an unnamed "medicine man". Neither story has ever been substantiated. There is no evidence that Essiac is a Native American or First Nations remedy. However, there are multiple factors that indicate the formula is not from any Native American or First Nations culture. Notably, in the original recipe, only one of the plants in the mixture, slippery elm, is indigenous to the Americas; none of the other herbs are native to North America. Caisse changed her story about the origins of the remedy, as well as the ingredients in the formula, several times, and was said to be fond of cultivating "an air of mystery" around it. The name "Essiac", which Caisse gave to the tea, is Caisse's name spelled backwards. Today, Essiac is often sold with apparatus (such as bottles and infusers) for making the tea, and is sometimes promoted with untrue claims that scientific studies have shown it to be effective.

In 1977, Caisse sold her Essiac formula and trademark rights to Respirin Corporation (a Canadian company and predecessor in title to Essiac Products Inc.), which attempted to commercialize the product. However, the company was unable to show any efficacy of Essiac against cancer. Repeated laboratory tests showed that Essiac failed to slow tumor growth and, in large doses, killed test animals. In a number of studies, Essiac actually increased the rate of cancer growth. As a result, both the U.S. and Canadian governments refused to approve Essiac as a medical treatment. Essiac was instead marketed by Essiac Products Inc. and others as a dietary supplement, subject to much looser regulation and not required to show any proof of effectiveness.

== Effectiveness ==
Essiac's purported effect on cancer has been reviewed by several major medical and scientific bodies, including the U.S. Food and Drug Administration (FDA), the National Cancer Institute, and the American Cancer Society. The American Cancer Society states that "Reviews of medical records of people who have been treated with Essiac do not support claims that this product helps people with cancer live longer or that it relieves their symptoms." The NCI states "Essiac and Flor Essence have not reported clear evidence of an anticancer effect", and the FDA described Essiac as a "Fake Cancer 'Cure' Consumers Should Avoid". Researchers at Memorial Sloan-Kettering Cancer Center have written that Essiac continues to be a popular cancer therapy despite unsubstantiated claims of its effectiveness. Cancer Research UK also notes that there is "no scientific evidence that Essiac can help to treat cancer" and cautions "Always ask your doctors and nurses about whether any complementary or alternative cancer therapy you are thinking of using might interact with your other treatments."

== Side effects ==
"Essiac may cause headache, nausea, diarrhea or constipation, vomiting, low blood sugar, liver damage, and kidney damage. Allergic rashes are possible. Rarely, serious allergic reactions have been reported."

== See also ==
- List of ineffective cancer treatments
