= Poly-MVA =

Multi-component dietary supplement

Poly-MVA (or Lipoic Acid Mineral Complex) is a dietary supplement created by Merrill Garnett (1931–), a former dentist turned biochemist. Poly-MVA is an unproven alternative cancer treatment.

== Description ==
The "MVA" in "Poly-MVA" means "minerals vitamins and amino acids". Poly-MVA contains lipoic acid, acetylcysteine, palladium, B vitamins, and other ingredients. The substance is red-brown liquid that is taken by mouth.

In 2004, a year's supply of Poly-MVA was reported as costing US$19,800. As of 2019, the cost appears to fluctuate according to an individual's situation and dosage.

== Alternative medicine ==
Poly-MVA is promoted with claims that it can treat a variety of human diseases, including cancer and HIV/AIDS. The promotional effort is supported by customer testimonials, but there is no medical evidence that Poly-MVA confers any health benefit and some concern it may inhibit the effectiveness of mainstream cancer treatments if used at the same time.

In 2005, Poly-MVA was listed as one of the ineffective alternative cancer treatments being sold by the clinics clustered in and around Tijuana, Mexico. None of the information referenced in this review is specific to Poly-MVA.

== See also ==
- Antioxidant
- List of unproven and disproven cancer treatments
