= Insulin potentiation therapy =

Unproven alternative cancer treatment

Insulin potentiation therapy (IPT) is an unproven alternative cancer treatment using insulin as an adjunct to low-dose chemotherapy. It was promoted by a paper in the controversial and non-peer reviewed journal Medical Hypotheses. It is not an evidence-based cancer treatment, and the costs of IPT are not covered by health insurance.

According to Quackwatch, "Insulin Potentiation Therapy (IPT) is one of several unproven, dangerous treatments that is promoted by a small group of practitioners without trustworthy evidence that it works."

== History ==
It was developed by Donato Perez Garcia, MD in 1930. Originally, Garcia targeted syphilis, and later tried the treatment for chronic degenerative diseases and some types of cancer.

== Method ==
Generally, a dose of insulin is injected into a vein, followed by a much lower dose of a chemotherapy drug. Then sugar water is injected to stop the hypoglycemia (low blood sugar) caused by the insulin injection.

== Efficacy ==
IPT has not been proven to work. Lab research indicates that there is not even a theoretical possibility of it being an effective treatment for most cancers. Research over the decades has proved that most cancers grow when exposed to more insulin.

One study of men with prostate cancer showed that survival was significantly shorter (11 months for men who received IPT vs 18.9 months for men on standard treatment). A second small trial showed that women with metastatic breast cancer were less likely to see short-term disease progression if they received IPT with low-dose methotrexate than if they received either insulin alone or low-dose methotrexate alone. (This study did not compare IPT against any of the proven multi-drug chemotherapy regimens.)

== Adverse effects ==
The immediate risk is hypoglycemia. The main risk is that the person will die from cancer because IPT does not work.

The use of lower than normal doses of chemotherapy can cause drug resistance, which could make future treatment at standard, proven doses ineffective. For some cancers, especially breast and colon cancers, insulin may promote tumor growth.

== Mechanism of action ==
Two main ideas about how it might work have been proposed over the years. The first idea, which has been proven wrong, is that insulin makes cells more permeable, so that the chemotherapy drugs are absorbed faster into cells. The other idea is that insulin might cause the cells to start dividing, which makes them more susceptible to destruction of many cytotoxic chemotherapy drugs.

== Cost ==
Costs run up to US$2,000 per treatment session. Multiple sessions are normal. One business charges US$50,000 for the first two months. Patients pay the full cost out of pocket, because it is an unproven therapy that is not covered by health insurance.

== See also ==
- List of ineffective cancer treatments
