= Modified citrus pectin =

More digestible form of pectin

Modified citrus pectin (also known as citrus pectin, and MCP) is a modified, more digestible form of pectin. It is obtained from the peels, seeds and pulp of citrus fruits using a chemical extraction process.

In general, pectin is a gel-forming polysaccharide from plant cell walls, especially apple and citrus fruits. Pectin is a type of viscous dietary fiber and varies in the length of polysaccharide chains. Although pectin is not digestible by humans, it can be treated to create smaller fiber fragments to increase absorbability across the small intestine epithelium.

== Description ==
Modified citrus pectin (also known as depolymerized pectin, fractioned pectin, modified pectin, pH-modified pectin, low molecular weight pectin, and MCP) is a more digestible form of pectin. Modified citrus pectin is composed predominantly of D-polygalacturonates, which are more easily absorbed by the human digestive system.

Modified citrus pectin is promoted and sold as a dietary supplement.

== Safety and adverse effects ==
In general, pectin is considered as a safe ingredient used as emulsifiers and gelling agents in manufactured foods; accordingly, pectin and MCP are generally recognized as safe.

Although modified citrus pectin is more easily digested than natural citrus pectin, individuals with allergies or sensitivities to citrus may experience diarrhea or stomach discomfort when taking either type of citrus pectin.

There is no clinical evidence that modified citrus pectin is effective to treat cancer.

== See also ==
- List of unproven and disproven cancer treatments
