= Electro Physiological Feedback Xrroid =

Alternative medicine device

Electro Physiological Feedback Xrroid (EPFX)
Alternative medicine
- Claims: Analysis and adjustment of "frequencies" related to health.
- Related fields: Energy medicine/radionics
- Year proposed: 1985
- Original proponents: Bill Nelson/Desiré Dubounet
- See also: Hulda Regehr Clark, Royal Rife

Electro Physiological Feedback Xrroid (EPFX) (/ˈzɪərɔɪd/), also known as Quantum Xrroid Consciousness Interface (QXCI), is a radionics device which claims to read the body's reactivity to various frequencies and then send back other frequencies to make changes in the body. It is manufactured and marketed by self-styled "Professor Bill Nelson," also known as Desiré Dubounet. She was operating in Hungary, a fugitive from the US following indictment on fraud charges connected to EPFX. She died in 2025.

Descriptions of the device in mainstream media note its US$20,000 price tag and the improbable nature of the claims made for it. It has reportedly been used to "treat" a variety of serious diseases including cancer. In one documented case, undiagnosed and untreated leukaemia resulted in the death of a patient.

The website Quackwatch posted an analysis of the device by Stephen Barrett which concludes: "The Quantum Xrroid device is claimed to balance 'bio-energetic' forces that the scientific community does not recognize as real. It mainly reflects skin resistance (how easily low-voltage electric currents from the device pass through the skin), which is not related to the body's health."

In 2009, imports to the US were banned.

== See also ==
- List of ineffective cancer treatments
- Pseudoscience
