= Seasilver =

Dietary supplement

- Type: Dietary supplement
- Inventor: Bela Berkes; Jason Berkes
- Inception: 1992
- Manufacturer: Seasilver USA, Inc. Americaloe, Inc.
- Available: No
- Last production year: 2006

Seasilver is the trademarked name of a commercial dietary supplement produced and sold by the companies Seasilver USA, Inc. and Americaloe, Inc.

The product was promoted with the false claim that it could "cure 650 diseases", resulting in the prosecution of the companies' owners.

== Corporate history ==
Seasilver USA, Inc. was founded in 1992, and ceased operating at the end of 2006. Americaloe, Inc. was founded in Nevada in 1997.

=== Lawsuit ===
In 2002 the US Food and Drug Administration sent a warning letter to the product's promoters for making unsubstantied health claims. On June 12, 2003, the FDA and FTC lodged a complaint that the two companies and their owners, Jason and Bela Berkes, had misled their customers with claims that Seasilver cured 650 diseases, including AIDS and some types of cancer.

In 2003 US$5.6 million worth of product was seized by the FDA and on March 4, 2004, the companies and their owners agreed to pay $3 million in six months as redress to their customers, to destroy the stocks of product, and to avoid making misleading statements to settle the FTC's complaint. They could still sell Seasilver, as long as any claims were supported by sufficient proof. If they did not pay the $3 million, they would have to pay the full $120 million judgement. The FTC found that the claims that the products were "clinically proven to treat or cure 650 diseases, including cancer and AIDS, and cause rapid, substantial and permanent weight loss without dieting" were false and could not be substantiated. This was upheld by a federal judge in June 2006; the company was required to pay a penalty of $120 million because they had paid less than one-third of the required $3 million to refund customers. Following non-payment and a failed appeal, the full fine of $120 million was re-affirmed by a ruling of the Ninth Circuit Court of Appeals on April 10, 2008.

== Product ==
The Seasilver product was made of a variety of ingredients including pau d'arco, cranberry fruits and aloe. It was a liquid supplement which was sold through a network marketing arrangement. It was priced at $39.95 for a 32-oz bottle. Before the legal action, Seasilver USA publicly stated that they made annual profits of $180 million from Seasilver.

=== Health claims ===
In their initial complaint letter on April 3, 2002, the FDA identified the following disease claims which were made for Seasilver:

- Balance Blood Sugar - Hypoglycemia and Diabetes
- Relief From All Inflammatory Conditions - Arthritis/Sports Injuries
- Provides Allergy Relief
- Reduce Risk of Heart Disease
- Reduces Risk of Stroke
- Reduces Risk of Cancer
- anti-bacterial, anti-fungal, anti-viral, anti-parasitic...properties
- anti-tumor
- for all types of inflammation, bums [sic] and wounds
- Anti-Diabetic
- Anti-Bacterial/Anti-Viral/Anti-fungal
- Anti-Ulcerogenic

=== Health effect ===
According to the Memorial Sloan Kettering Cancer Center, "no studies have shown the efficacy of this costly product", and Quackwatch say there is "no logical reason to use the product". FDA Commissioner Mark McClellan described it as "intolerable health fraud ... that preys on consumers and patients by selling worthless dietary supplements as cures for serious and chronic diseases and conditions."

== See also ==
- List of ineffective cancer treatments
