= Carctol =

Ineffective herbal cancer treatment

Carctol is an ineffective cancer treatment made by mixing eight Indian herbs. First promoted in 1968 by Nandlal Tiwari, it gained widespread popularity in United Kingdom.

Carctol has been aggressively marketed as being able to treat cancer and reduce the side-effects of chemotherapy. However, there is no medical evidence that it has any benefits whatsoever for people with cancer.

== Background ==
Carctol is a herbal dietary supplement marketed with claims it is based on traditional ayurvedic medicine. It is made from Hemidesmus indicus, Tribulus terrestris, Piper cubeba, Ammani vesicatoria, Lepidium sativum, Blepharis edulis, Smilax china, and Rheum australe (syn. R. emodi).

It was In 2009, Edzard Ernst wrote that it was still promoted in the United Kingdom; public relations companies hired by its sellers had garnered it wide coverage on the web and, according to the British Medical Journal, in the media generally.

== Criticism ==
Edzard Ernst has noted a complete absence of any form of scientific evidence to assert that carctol is any beneficial to cancer patients. A few studies about the chemical composition of carctol along with inconclusive surveys of patients who used it were noted to be published in non-peer reviewed journals.

Cancer Research UK say of carctol, "available scientific evidence does not support its use for the treatment of cancer in humans".

Harriet A. Hall includes carctol among the biologically-based remedies promoted by naturopaths. Hall laments that frauds and quacks persistently try to take advantage of the vulnerability of cancer patients.

== See also ==
- List of ineffective cancer treatments
- Naturopathy
