= PC-SPES =

Alternative medicine supplement

PC-SPES is an alternative medicine supplement made from multiple herbs and marketed as a treatment for prostate cancer.

There is no good evidence it is of any benefit as a cancer treatment.

== Similar supplements ==
Other similar supplements are named PC-CARE, PC-PLUS and PC-HOPE. Like PC-SPES they have no good evidence of medical benefit.

== History ==
PC-SPES was devised and patented by Sophie Chen in the 1990s. The formulation was patented and the drug manufactured and sitributed by a Californian company, BotanicLab.

Clinical trials of PC-SPES appeared to show it had some effect on human hormones, but it was discovered the PC-SPES had been adulterated with estrogenic chemicals, which were likely the cause of these effects.

== See also ==
- List of unproven and disproven cancer treatments
