= Greek cancer cure =

Putative cancer cure

Alternative therapy

The Greek cancer cure was a putative cancer cure invented and promoted by microbiologist Hariton-Tzannis Alivizatos (died 1991). It consisted of intravenous injections of a fluid for which Alivizatos would not reveal the formula.

== Medical claims and criticism ==
In 1983, Alivizatos announced that he had developed a serum that had a 60-percent success rate in arresting most types of cancers, with the exception of extremely advanced cases. He claimed that the serum could attack a protein-like substance that surrounds cancer cells and weaken the body's ability to keep the disease from spreading. Greek health officials ridiculed Alivizatos's assertions, while the American Cancer Society warned his current patients that there was no evidence that the diagnostic procedures and treatment for cancer proposed had resulted in any benefits for the treatment of cancer in human beings. They concluded that, "there is no evidence that any aspect of the diagnostic test nor the treatment... are effective in the treatment of cancer." In addition they state "Nor is there any evidence that.. the intravenous injections are safe."

== See also ==
- List of unproven and disproven cancer treatments
