= Máté Hidvégi =

Hungarian biochemist

Mate Hidvegi
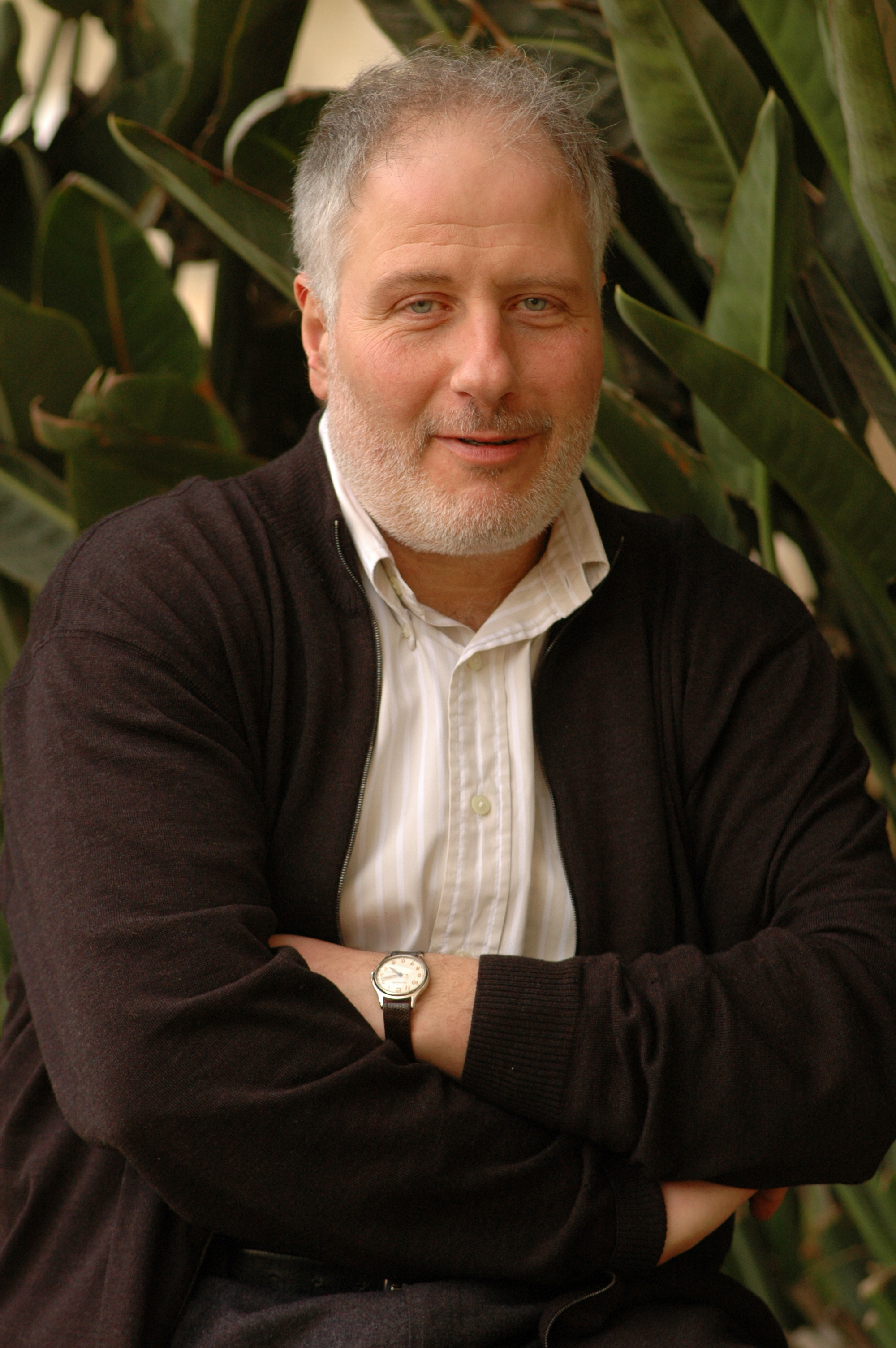
- Mate Hidvegi
- Born: 9 November 1955 (age 70); Budapest, Hungary
- Education: Budapest University of Technology and Economics
- Known for: Fermented wheat germ extract
- Awards: Jedlik Anyos Prize 2007
- Scientific career
- Fields: cancer research
- Workplaces: Budapest University of Technology and Economics, freelance

Mate Hidvegi (born 9 November 1955 in Budapest, Hungary) is a Hungarian biochemist and co-inventor of Avemar and Oncomar, fermented wheat germ extract based nutraceuticals.

== Life ==
Hidvegi was born in Budapest, Hungary, on 9 November 1955. He is the son of György Hidvégi-Hoffmann and Katalin Dávid.

== Education and early career ==
He received his Bachelor of Science in 1978 and Master of Science in 1980 from Technology University Budapest. He also received his Doctor of Philosophy from Technology University Budapest in 1983.Then he taught at what is now Budapest University of Technology and Economics from 1984-1987 as assistant professor and since 1992 as professor. After finishing university, he worked in the cereal industry and was co-developer of a patented feed advisory system based on near infrared ingredient data. Hidvegi was the pioneer in the development of technologies of mass-production and therapeutic use of instantized herbal extracts in Hungary. Between 1988-1990 Hidvegi was Post-Doctoral Fellow at the Grain Research Laboratory of the Canadian Grain Commission, Winnipeg, Canada.

In 1996 Hidvegi was co-founder of Biromedicina (joint stock company), what is now called The First Hungarian Corporation for Cancer Research and Oncology. The company’s mission was to market Hidvegi's product Avemar, a fermented wheat germ extract-based nutraceutical.

Hidvegi holds a PhD and a Dr. Habil in chemistry, and an honorary professorship at the Jewish University, Budapest.

== Early academic life ==
Hidvegi's first publications were about the theories of the origins of life, and the elaboration of a plausible mechanism for the biogenesis and evolution of biomembranes. He worked out the metabolic map as well as the reaction kinetics of a theoretical first living cell.

== Development of Esterin ==
Hidvegi invented and hold the patent for the manufacturing process of an alfalfa-based extract (Esterin), which has been claimed to lower serum cholesterol levels (U.S patent 5,277,910 January 11, 1994).

== Development of fermented wheat germ extract (Avemar/Ave) ==
Hidvegi is the co-inventor of a patented fermented wheat germ extract-based nutraceutical known as Avemar. In the U.S., Avemar is classified as a dietary supplement and marketed under the trade name Ave (American BioSciences, Inc.; Blauvelt, NY). In Hungary Avemar as a dietary food for cancer patients.

In 2009 Hidvegi marketed a new dietary food for special medical purposes for cancer patients based on the Avemar, which was sold as Oncomar and (in the U.S.) AvéUltra.

== Publications ==
- Bekes F, Hidvegi M, Zsigmond A, Lasztity R: A novel mathematical model for determining in vitro biological value of proteins and its application for non-linear optimization of the nutritional quality of feed and food formulas. In: Progress in Cereal Science and Technology Vol. 5B, J. Holas and J. Kratochvil, Eds., Elsevier Publ., Amsterdam, 1983. pp. 1213–1218.
- Mercer LP, Haijazi H, Hidvegi M: Weanling rats display bioperiodicity of growth and food intake rates. J Nutrition 123: 1356-1362, 1993.
- Lasztity R, Hidvegi M, Bata A: Saponins in food. Food Rev Int 14: 371-390, 1998.
- Tomoskozi-Farkas R, Hidvegi M, Lasztity R: Investigation of methoxy-substituted benzoquinone derivatives in tree samples grown in Hungary. Acta Biol Hung 49: 79-87, 1998.
- Hidvegi M, Raso E, Tomoskozi-Farkas R, Paku S, Lapis K, Szende B: The effect of Avemar and Avemar + vitamin C on tumor growth and metastasis in experimental animals. Anticancer Res 18: 2353-2358, 1998.
- Hidvegi M, Raso E, Tomoskozi-Farkas R, Lapis K, Szende B: Effect of MSC on the immune response of mice. Immunopharmacology 41: 183-186, 1999.
- Hidvegi M, Raso E, Tomoskozi-Farkas R, Szende B, Paku S, Prónai L, Bocsi J, Lapis K: MSC, a new benzoquinone-containing natural product with antimetastatic effect. Cancer Biother Radiopharm 14: 277-289, 1999.
- Jakab F, Mayer A, Hoffmann A, Hidvegi M: First clinical data of a natural immunomodulator in colorectal cancer. Hepatogastroenterology 47: 393-395, 2000.
- Boros LG, Lee W-NP, Hidvegi M, Go VLW: Metabolic effects of fermented wheat germ extract with anti-tumor properties in cultured MIA pancreatic adenocarcinoma cells. Pancreas 21: 434, 2000.
- Boros L. G, Lapis K, Szende B, Tomoskozi-Farkas R, Balogh A, Boren J, Marin S, Cascante M, Hidvegi M: Wheat germ extract decreases glucose uptake and RNA ribose formation but increases fatty acid synthesis in MIA pancreatic adenocarcinoma cells. Pancreas 23: 141-147, 2001.
- Zalatnai A, Lapis K, Szende B, Raso E, Telekes A, Resetar A, Hidvegi M: Wheat germ extract inhibits experimental colon carcinogenesis in F-344 rats. Carcinogenesis 22: 1649-1652, 2001.
- Ehrenfeld M, Blank M, Shoenfeld Y, Hidvegi M: Avemar (a new benzoquinone-containing natural product) administration interferes with the Th2 response in experimental SLE and promotes amelioration of the disease. Lupus 10: 622-627, 2001.
- Fajka-Boja R, Hidvegi M, Shoenfeld Y, Ion G, Demydenko D, Tomoskozi-Farkas R, Vizler Cs, Telekes A, Resetar A, Monostori E: Fermented wheat germ extract induces apoptosis and downregulation of major histocompatibility complex class I proteins in tumor T and B cell lines. Int J Oncol 20: 563-570, 2002.
- Jakab F, Shoenfeld Y, Balogh A, Nichelatti M, Hoffmann A, Kahan Zs, Lapis K, Mayer A, Sapy P, Szentpetery F, Telekes A, Thurzo L, Vagvolgyi A, Hidvegi M: A medical nutriment has supportive value in the treatment of colorectal cancer. Br J Cancer 89: 465-469, 2003.
- Garami M, Schuler D, Babosa M, Borgulya G, Hauser P, Müller J, Paksy A, Szabó E, Hidvegi M, Fekete Gy: Fermented wheat germ extract reduces chemotherapy-induced febrile neutropenia in pediatric cancer patients. J Pediatric Hematol Oncol 10: 631-635, 2004.
- Stipkovits L, Lapis K, Hidvegi M, Kosa E, Glavits R, Resetar A: Testing the efficacy of fermented wheat germ extract against Mycoplasma gallisepticum infection of chicken. Poultry Sci 11: 1844-1848, 2004.
- Balint G, Apathy A, Gaal M, Telekes A, Resetar A, Blazso G, Falkay G, Szende B, Paksy A, Ehrenfeld M, Shoenfeld Y, Hidvegi M: Effect of Avemar - a fermented wheat germ extract - on rheumatoid arthritis. Preliminary data. Clin Exp Rheumatol 24: 325-328, 2006.
- Telekes A, Resetar A, Balint G, Blazso G, Falkay G, Lapis K, Raso E, Szende B, Ehrenfeld M, Shoenfeld Y, Hidvegi M. Fermented wheat germ extract (Avemar) inhibits adjuvant arthritis. Ann N Y Acad Sci 1110: 348-361, 2007.
- Saiko P, Ozsvar-Kozma M, Graser G, Lackner A, Grusch M, Madlener S, Krupitza G, Jaeger W, Hidvegi M, Agarwal RP, Fritzer-Szekeres M, Szekeres T: Avemar, a nontoxic fermented wheat germ extract, attenuates the growth of sensitive and 5-FdUrd/Ara-C cross-resistant H9 human lymphoma cells through induction of apoptosis. Oncol Rep 21: 787-791, 2009.
- Lasztity R, Hidvegi M (eds): Amino acid composition and biological value of cereal proteins. D. Reidel Publ Co., Boston, 1985.
