= Revici's Guided Chemotherapy =

Ineffective alternative cancer treatment

Revici's Guided Chemotherapy is an ineffective cancer treatment devised by Emanuel Revici (Bucharest 6 September 1896 – 9 January 1998), a physician from Romania.

Revici's early work on experimental chemical-based treatments for cancer between 1920 and 1941 attracted a degree of support. However, his work increasingly found disfavor with the scientific and medical communities, and his medical license was revoked in 1993.

Revici's Guided Chemotherapy is based on the idea that all illness is caused by an "imbalance" of metabolism. People with cancer were divided into two groups, which he called catabolic and anabolic, based on the pH of their urine and similar tests that were unrelated to the type or location of the cancer. The people in his two groups were given different treatments. The treatment was to give a mixture of chemical substances (such as glycerol, n-butyl alcohol, and sulfurated vegetable oil) by mouth or injection.

A Clinical Appraisal Group was organized in January 1963 to evaluate Revici's cancer treatment. The group found that the treatment had no effect on tumors, that two-thirds of his cancer patients died during treatment, and that overall 85% of them died. The group concluded that the treatment has no value.

The American Cancer Society notes that Revici's Guided "chemotherapy" is different from modern conventional chemotherapy, and states: "Available scientific evidence does not support claims that Revici's guided chemotherapy is effective in treating cancer or any other disease. It may also cause potentially serious side effects."

== Notable patients ==
- Marie Panthès
- Arnold Weinstein

== See also ==
- List of unproven and disproven cancer treatments
- Humorism – ancient Greek idea that illness is caused by a limited number of imbalances in the body
