= Cancell =

Dietary supplement

Cancell, also called Protocel, Sheridan's Formula, Jim's Juice, Crocinic Acid, JS–114, JS–101, 126–F, and Entelev, is a formula that has been promoted as a treatment for a wide range of diseases, including cancer. Cancell is available in tablet and liquid form. Originally called Entelev, the formula was developed by biochemist James V. Sheridan. Sheridan sought to target the primarily anaerobic cell metabolism of cancer cells (following the theories of Otto Warburg), claiming to lower cell potential leading to the destruction of cancer cells. The Cancell formula was tested by the National Cancer Institute and found to be ineffective against cancer, though Cancell continues to be marketed as a dietary supplement in the US.

== Formulation and efficacy ==
The U.S. Food and Drug Administration (FDA) has listed the components as inositol, nitric acid, sodium sulfite, potassium hydroxide, sulfuric acid, and catechol. Precise formulation varies by manufacturer, and may include crocinic acid and various minerals and vitamins.

Researchers at the National Cancer Institute (NCI) tested the constituents of Cancell in animal experiments in 1978 and 1980 and in vitro on human tumors in 1990 and 1991. They concluded that the compounds comprising Cancell could not be taken in doses high enough to kill cancer cells in the body, and that further study was not warranted. No peer-reviewed clinical or animal trials of Cancell have demonstrated any positive effect; claims for Cancell's efficacy are limited to anecdotal reports and testimonials. The American Cancer Society and Memorial Sloan-Kettering Cancer Center recommend against the use of CanCell, as there is no evidence that it is effective in treating any disease, and its proposed method of action is not consistent with modern science.

== Legal status ==
Injunction proceedings were instigated by the FDA in June 1987 for manufacturing compliance violations and failure to maintain complaints files. A complaint for permanent injunction was filed February 21, 1989 in the U.S. District Court for the Eastern District of Michigan to enjoin Sheridan and Edward J. Sopcak from distributing CanCell. At a hearing in November 1992, the Court found Sopcak to be in civil contempt and ordered him to comply with the injunction immediately.

Cancell is currently distributed as a dietary supplement under the names Protocel and Entelev, and is not approved by the FDA for use as a cancer treatment or for any other purpose. Since it is marketed as a dietary supplement with no health claims attached, its regulation falls under the Dietary Supplement Health and Education Act of 1994 (DSHEA).

== See also ==
- List of ineffective cancer treatments
