= Fermented wheat germ extract =

Fermented wheat germ extract (FWGE), also called fermented wheat germ powder (FWGP), is a concentrated extract of wheat germ derived from the germ (endosperm, or seed) of the wheat plant. FWGE differs from ordinary wheat germ in that it is fermented with baker's yeast to concentrate biologically-active benzoquinones. FWGE is available commercially and is sold under the trade name Avemar. In the U.S., the product is classified as a dietary supplement and is marketed as Awge.

FWGE is marketed with false claims of benefits for human health.

== Misleading medical claims ==
FWGE if marketing with a number of misleading medical claims, including that it supports the immune system and is useful in the treatment of cancer.

== Precautions ==
According to the Memorial Sloan-Kettering Cancer Center, FWGE should not be taken by children or by women who are pregnant or breastfeeding. It should not be taken by those who have undertaken organ or tissue transplants, or those who suffer from bleeding erosions or bleeding ulcers of the gastrointestinal tract, enteritis, colitis, or malabsorption syndrome. Patients taking prescription medicine should consult with their doctor before use.

== See also ==
- Alternative cancer treatments
- List of unproven and disproven cancer treatments
