= Catherine Kousmine =

Russian physician and alternative cancer treatment advocate

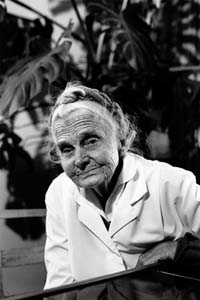
- Born: 17 September 1904; Hvalynsky
- Died: 24 August 1992 (aged 87); Lutry
- Occupation: Physician

Catherine Kousmine (17 September 1904 in Hvalynsky, Russia – 24 August 1992 in Lutry, Switzerland) was a Russian physician who proposed an alternative cancer treatment.

Kousmine devised a restrictive diet for treating many human ailments including multiple sclerosis and cancer. There is, however, no scientific evidence that it is effective.

== Life ==
Born in 1904 into a well-to-do family in Russia, Catherine Kousmine and her parents fled the country in 1916 before the Russian revolution, settling in Lausanne. The young Catherine went to the Ecole Supérieure of Lausanne where she graduated in sciences. She then went on to medical school. Upon graduation in 1928, she moved to Zurich, in professor Guido Fanconi's unit, to specialize in pediatrics, then worked in Vienna, Austria, where she got her degree in this discipline.

Back in Switzerland, she had to resume her work as a general practitioner because her degree in pediatrics was not recognized by Swiss authorities. Dr. Kousmine spent most of her life in Switzerland. She set up the Fondation Catherine Kousmine in Lutry, Switzerland, to promote her methods. It has sister foundations in France, Germany and Italy. There is also a Kousmine Medical Center in Vevey, Switzerland.

== Work ==
Kousmine advocated a restrictive diet as a basis for treating a number of human ailments, especially cancer. The diet, that Dr. Kousmine provided as an alternative to mainstream medicine emphasizes first of all to put off saturated fats, totally for very ill people, to eat fruits, vegetables and a lot of whole grains and particularly advocates a no cooked grain- and no cooked seed-based breakfast; vitamins supplements are also incorporated.

== Awards ==
- In 1985, the Société d'Encouragement au Progrès gave her the Médaille de Vermeil for her outstanding accomplishment with multiple sclerosis.
- In 1989, she was made an honorary citizen of Lutry, Switzerland.

== Publications ==
- Soyez bien dans votre assiette jusqu'à 80 ans et plus (Be mindful of your diet, up to 80 and beyond), éditions Sand, 1980, ISBN 2-7107-0158-8
- La sclérose en plaque est guérissable (Multiple sclerosis is curable), éditions Delachaux et Nestlé 1983, ISBN 2-603-00502-2
- Sauvez votre corps (Save your body), éditions Robert Laffont, 1987, ISBN 2-290-33632-7; this is a sequel to Soyez bien dans votre assiette, with more cases and in-depth explanations

== See also ==
- Alternative cancer treatments
- Diet and cancer
- Johanna Budwig
