= Nicholas Gonzalez (physician) =

American physician (1947–2015)

Nicholas James Gonzalez (December 28, 1947 – July 21, 2015) was a New York–based physician known for developing the Gonzalez regimen (or Gonzalez protocol), an alternative cancer treatment. Gonzalez's treatments were based on his belief that pancreatic enzymes were the body's main defense against cancer and could be used as a cancer treatment. His methods have been generally rejected by the medical community, and he has been characterized as a quack and fraud by other doctors and health fraud watchdog groups. In 1994 Gonzalez was reprimanded and placed on two years' probation by the New York State Medical Board for "departing from accepted practice".

In one non-randomized clinical trial of terminally ill people with pancreatic cancer, the Gonzalez-treated patients were found to have died much earlier than those treated with conventional chemotherapy. A better quality of life was also reported by the chemotherapy arm.

== Biography ==
Gonzalez was born December 28, 1947, in Flushing, New York. He graduated Phi Beta Kappa and magna cum laude from Brown University, with a degree in English literature. From 1970 to 1977, Gonzalez worked as a journalist for Time Inc. and as a freelance writer, covering a variety of health-related topics, including a July 1972 cover story in New York Magazine, a 1976 cover story for Family Health Magazine, and an article for Prevention Magazine. Gonzalez became interested in medical research, and in cancer research in particular while covering these topics.

Gonzalez completed postgraduate premedical work at Columbia University and received his medical degree from Cornell University in 1983. Gonzalez worked with Robert A. Good at Memorial Sloan-Kettering Cancer Center while in medical school. After receiving his medical degree, Gonzalez completed an internship in internal medicine at Vanderbilt University. From 1984 to 1986, Gonzalez worked with Good again, completing a fellowship in immunology while at University of Oklahoma and All Children's Hospital in St. Petersburg, Florida.

Gonzalez died of a suspected heart attack on July 21, 2015, at age 67. A conspiracy theory subsequently spread that Gonzalez was murdered as part of a systematic plot to kill "holistic" practitioners.

== Cancer treatment and its effectiveness ==
Gonzalez's treatment methods, which he started using in 1987, were developed from previous work by the orthodontist William Donald Kelley. Gonzalez believed that cancer was caused by a poor diet, a problem compounded when one does not eat a diet that corresponds with one's "metabolic type"; and that environmental pollution and daily stress contributed to health problems. The Gonzalez regimen proposed as a treatment a cure-oriented change in lifestyle and nutrition, the use of oral pancreatic enzymes, large numbers of dietary supplements (up to 150 pills per day) and twice daily coffee enemas. A clinical trial on Gonzalez's treatments produced "limited and inconclusive" results regarding the efficacy of the Gonzalez Regimen as a treatment for cancer.

In 1999 Gonzalez published an article describing prolonged life in a small, select group of patients with pancreatic cancer in the peer-reviewed journal Nutrition and Cancer. Subsequently, others concluded that the longer survival time reported by Gonzalez was due to selection bias and other confounds.

=== Rejection by mainstream medicine ===
Like his mentor, William Donald Kelley, Gonzalez's treatment method was rejected by the mainstream medical establishment. Gonzalez was characterized as a quack and fraud by other doctors and health fraud watchdog groups, and in 1994 he was reprimanded and placed on two years' probation by the New York state medical board for "departing from accepted practice". Gonzalez was given two years of probation with a stipulation that he undergo retraining and psychological examinations, and do 200 hours of community service. He was fully licensed to practice in New York.

Gonzalez lost two malpractice lawsuits. In 1997, a New York court found Gonzalez "negligent" for his cancer treatment; according to news reports, Gonzalez "had to pay $2.5 million in damages to a patient he wrongly claimed to have cured" of cancer. The former patient had been diagnosed with uterine cancer but "Gonzalez discouraged her from following through on her cancer specialist's advice, instead recommending dietary supplements and frequent coffee enemas". The patient had refused both standard treatment and an experimental protocol, but after the cancer spread to her spine, she discontinued Gonzalez's treatment and received chemotherapy and external beam radiation. Sometime during this period, she began having problems with her eyesight, back and hip, and she eventually became blind. In 2000, Gonzalez was found partly liable (49%) in the death of a patient with Hodgkin's lymphoma and ordered to pay $282,000 in damages, due to his use of an unproven cancer screening method instead of standard cancer testing.

The American Cancer Society notes that there is "no convincing scientific evidence that [the Gonzalez treatment] is effective in treating cancer" and that some portions of the treatment may be harmful. The clinical efficacy of coffee enemas has not been proven, and they have adverse effects. Gonzalez's study published in Nutrition and Cancer in 1999 was criticized by an expert in integrative oncology research methods for its small sample size, selection bias, and failure to account for confounding variables.

Gonzalez "never explicitly rejected the more orthodox precepts of his profession", insisting that he wanted his research evaluated by independent scientists.

=== Clinical trial ===
A randomized phase III clinical trial for the possible treatment of pancreatic cancer with the Gonzalez Regimen was funded by a $1.4 million grant from the National Center for Complementary and Alternative Medicine, and co-sponsored by the National Cancer Institute, awarded in 1999 to Columbia University's Rosenthal Center for Alternative Medicine. The trial was designed to compare the efficacy of pancreatic enzyme therapy plus a specialized diet with gemcitabine for stage II, stage III, or stage IV pancreatic cancer. However, the study had difficulty attracting patients, and most eligible patients refused random assignment, so the trial was changed in 2001 to a controlled, observational study.

The trial found that patients treated with the Gonzalez regime survived on average for 4.3 months; those using standard chemotherapy survived on average for 14 months and reported a better quality of life.

An accompanying editorial said it was troubling that expensive CAM therapies were not backed by firm evidence, and that the trial of the Gonzalez regimen was not capable of providing a definitive conclusion because of flaws in its design. Kimball Atwood said that flaws in the trial design might have led to bias in favor of the Gonzalez regimen but that it nevertheless amounted to "a slam-dunk condemnation" of the therapy.

This trial had been criticized for its implausible and unsupported theoretical model of cancer development which bears no resemblance to the scientific understanding of neoplasia, and because of Gonzalez's history of malpractice.

== See also ==
- List of ineffective cancer treatments

== Publications ==
- What Went Wrong: The Truth Behind the Clinical Trial of the Enzyme Treatment of Cancer (2012, New Spring Press; ISBN 978-0-9821965-3-3)
- One Man Alone: An Investigation of Nutrition, Cancer, and William Donald Kelley (2010, New Spring Press; ISBN 978-0-9821965-1-9)
- Gonzalez NJ, Isaacs LL. The Trophoblast and the Origins of Cancer: One solution to the medical enigma of our time. (2009, New Spring Press; ISBN 978-0-9821965-0-2)
- Fuhrman MP, Payne C, Eiden K, Steinle N, Gonzalez NJ. Nutrition and the Pancreas. In: Marian MJ, Williams PA, Bowers JM, eds. Integrating Therapeutic and Complementary Nutrition. (2007, CRC Press; ISBN 978-0-8493-1612-8)
