= Jessica Ainscough =

Australian proponent of alternative medicine (1985–2015)

- Born: 15 July 1985; Ipswich, Queensland, Australia
- Died: 26 February 2015 (aged 29); Sunshine Coast, Queensland, Australia
- Cause of death: Epithelioid sarcoma
- Other name: The Wellness Warrior
- Education: University of the Sunshine Coast
- Occupations: Journalist, cancer patient and alternative medicine blogger
- Years active: 2004–2015
- Known for: Promoting alternative cancer treatments on her blog
- Partner: Tallon Pamenter

Jessica Ainscough (15 July 1985 – 26 February 2015) was an Australian teen magazine editor who became a writer and wellness entrepreneur after rejecting the prescribed treatment for a rare cancer she was diagnosed with at the age of 22. Ainscough went by the self-coined nickname "The Wellness Warrior" and used her popular blog by the same name to share her personal story of using alternative cancer treatments. While the prescribed scientific treatment had a 10-year survival rate estimated to be 49–72%, with higher survival rates reported for patients of Ainscough's age range, she died of cancer at the age of 29, less than six years after switching to alternative treatments.

== Background ==
Jessica Ainscough was born in Australia in the South East Queensland city of Ipswich. Ainscough attended the University of the Sunshine Coast, graduating in 2005 with a Bachelor of Communications in journalism. During her last year of university, Ainscough gained work experience at the Sydney office of 9 to 5 Magazine where she had her first job after graduating. At the time of her diagnosis, Ainscough was working as an online editor for teen magazine Dolly.

Ainscough and her partner, Tallon Pamenter, were engaged in July 2014 and had planned to marry in September 2015.

== Cancer ==
=== Diagnosis ===
Ainscough was diagnosed with epithelioid sarcoma on 24 April 2008, following a biopsy of lumps removed from her left arm and hand. Ainscough recalled being informed that epithelioid sarcoma was an extremely rare cancer and difficult to treat. The incidence of epithelioid sarcoma was reported as 0.4 cases per million population in 2005. It is twice as likely to occur in men, and three-quarters of those diagnosed are between the age of 10 and 39 years. Although epithelioid sarcoma is less common in women, the prognosis has been reported to be more favourable. It is difficult to determine survival rates of epithelioid sarcoma because the tumors are slow growing and generally painless, so diagnosis often happens after metastasis, skewing statistics. Surgical oncologist David Gorski has written that, without treatment, most succumb to the disease within 10 years. With surgical resection, however, the 10-year survival rate is estimated to be 49–72%, and higher survival rates are reported in younger patients such as Ainscough. Ainscough died six years after switching from chemotherapy to non-scientific cancer "treatment" methods.

=== Initial treatment ===
Initially, the only treatment offered to Ainscough was an amputation of the affected arm at the shoulder, known as a forequarter amputation. Ainscough reluctantly agreed. Shortly before the scheduled surgery, though, her medical team offered an alternative treatment that was to involve an isolated limb perfusion. Ainscough consented to chemotherapy and had the procedure in June 2008. The initial scans following chemotherapy indicated that the cancer was in remission. However, by November of the following year, the cancer had returned. The only treatment option available was a forequarter amputation. Ainscough refused to undergo the amputation and, instead, turned to alternative cancer treatments.

=== Alternative cancer treatment ===
Following the return of her cancer, Ainscough began using Gerson Therapy, an alternative cancer treatment from the 1920s. Her condition was monitored by her "Gerson doctor" in Mexico who would receive Ainscough's blood tests, along with results from live blood analysis and iridology, two alternative diagnostic techniques, and conduct analysis using a machine called an "Indigo" that was claimed to be a "quantum biofeedback device".

== Influencers and supporters ==
At "Wellness Warrior Events," Ainscough was joined by other celebrity wellness entrepreneurs who would also share their alternative health journeys, including former actor Melissa Ambrosini, musician Wes Carr and celebrity chef Pete Evans. Ainscough invited Cyndi O'Meara, nutritionist and fellow Sunshine Coast wellness entrepreneur, to write the foreword of her book, and later acknowledged O'Meara as the person she admired most professionally. Ainscough also spoke and wrote extensively about the influence of her mother Sharyn Ainscough and alternative cancer treatment advocate Ian Gawler. Following Ainscough's death in February 2015, her funeral was attended by Belle Gibson, who falsely claimed to have cured her own cancer through alternative therapies.

Ainscough claimed that Ian Gawler's book, You can Conquer Cancer, was a major influence on her when she was initially diagnosed with cancer. Immediately before going to the Gerson clinic in Mexico in 2010, Ainscough and her partner Tallon Pamenter stayed at The Gawler Foundation. Afterwards, Ainscough wrote: "Last month I spent 10 days at the Gawler Foundation in Melbourne learning all about how to heal myself. It was the most beneficial 10 days of my life". Gawler Foundation founder Ian Gawler is a former veterinarian who survived cancer after surgical treatment, radiotherapy, and chemotherapy. Gawler claims to have overcome a secondary diagnosis of terminal metastatic cancer with a combination of Gerson Therapy and meditation. However, there was no biopsy taken to confirm the secondary cancer diagnosis, and experts have since attributed Gawler's symptoms to advanced tuberculosis—which he also received medical treatment for at the time—rather than secondary bone cancer.

=== Sharyn Ainscough ===
In April 2011, Jessica's mother, Sharyn Ainscough, was diagnosed with breast cancer. Sharyn also refused all conventional treatment instead opting to join her daughter in Gerson Therapy. Sharyn Ainscough died in October 2013, two and a half years after diagnosis, in line with expectations for untreated breast cancer. At the time of her death, it was widely reported that "Sharyn followed her daughter in advocating Gerson therapy after being diagnosed with breast cancer".

== Death ==
In December 2014, Ainscough wrote in her blog that she had returned to conventional medical care to treat a large fungating tumour under her left shoulder that had been bleeding non-stop for ten months, leaving her weak and uncomfortable. Under the care of an oncologist, Ainscough received six weeks of radiation therapy in the final weeks of her life, ultimately dying on 26 February 2015.

Responding to Ainscough's death, John Dwyer of Friends of Science in Medicine warned of the risk of bowel perforation associated with coffee enemas and said: "There is no credible scientific evidence for any of these alternative treatments that claim to cure cancer," adding that "it can be difficult for people to tell what claims are unscientific and what are not". Whether Ainscough ever directly claimed to have cured her cancer is difficult to ascertain as her blog, "The Wellness Warrior," with 1.5 million followers, has been deleted. However, examples of Ainscough alluding to Gerson Therapy successfully treating her cancer can be found. In an article titled "I'm healing myself from cancer naturally" written by Ainscough for the teen magazine she once edited, Ainscough wrote: "I am ecstatic to report that it has worked for me. I have had no cancer spread, no more lumps pop up (they were popping up rapidly before) and I can actually see some of my tumors coming out through my skin and disappearing." It was reported that Ainscough earned "six figures" in income from the "Wellness Warrior" brand.

== In media ==
The character of Milla Blake (portrayed by Alycia Debnam-Carey), in the Netflix series about Australian scammer Belle Gibson, Apple Cider Vinegar, was allegedly inspired by Ainscough, among other wellness influencers.

== Publication ==
- Make Peace With Your Plate, published 25 September 2013, by Hay House Inc.

== See also ==
- Belle Gibson
