= William Donald Kelley =

American alternative medicine therapist (1925–2005)

- Born: November 1, 1925; Winfield, Kansas, U.S.
- Died: January 30, 2005 (aged 79); Arkansas City, Kansas, U.S.
- Occupations: Orthodontist, writer

William Donald Kelley (November 1, 1925 – January 30, 2005) was an American orthodontist who developed "non-specific metabolic therapy," an alternative cancer treatment, now known to be ineffective, which he based on his personal belief that "wrong foods [cause] malignancy to grow, while proper foods [allow] natural body defenses to work."

Kelley received no training in oncology; according to Quackwatch, his ideas are "largely speculative and invalid." His therapy is not only ineffective, Quackwatch notes, but also causes people with cancer who take it to die more quickly and have a worse quality of life than those who receive standard treatment, and they can suffer side effects that are serious at the very least and can even actively cause their deaths.

== Kelley's cancer therapy ==
Kelley formulated his own ideas about cancer, basing them on those of Max Gerson, and named his treatment "non-specific metabolic therapy". According to Kelley, cancer is a single disease caused by the lack of certain enzymes. His treatment involves injection of pancreatic enzymes, 50 daily vitamins and minerals, regular administration of laetrile, frequent body shampoos, detoxication using coffee enemas, and a specific diet. Kelley also added prayer and osteopathic manipulations to his treatment regime.

In 1971, the American Cancer Society added non-specific metabolic therapy to a list of "unproven methods."

In 1980, Kelley's most famous patient, Steve McQueen, came to him with a case of inoperable mesothelioma that had not responded to mainstream treatment. As Kelley's regimen was applied to McQueen in Mexico, McQueen was falsely reported to be in remission and his case enjoyed widespread press coverage; People Weekly Magazine called him "McQueen's Holistic Medicine Man." McQueen died 3 months later, following an unorthodox operation to excise the growing tumors. Nevertheless, Kelley's regimen was subsequently sought out by many patients with terminal cancer.

In 2013 the Memorial Sloan-Kettering Cancer Center characterized Kelley's therapy as a type of metabolic therapy, like Gerson therapy and Contreras therapy, that shows "no evidence of efficacy." According to the center, "findings from a study involving patients with inoperable pancreatic cancer showed a decrease in overall survival and poorer quality of life ... compared to standard gemcitabine-based chemotherapy." The coffee enemas that form part of the treatment can have harmful, and possibly deadly, side effects.

== Later career and life ==
Kelley wrote a book entitled One Answer to Cancer, detailing his experiences as well as his methods. But by the 1980s, he had lost control of his once-thriving organization, and his dental license had been revoked. Kelley died of a heart attack on January 30, 2005, in Arkansas City, Kansas.

== See also ==
- List of ineffective cancer treatments
- Quackery
- Nicholas Gonzalez – developer of ineffective cancer treatment regime based on Kelley's work
