= Marian Neuhouser =

American epidemiologist and researcher

- Education: University of Washington; University of California
- Scientific career
- Workplaces: Fred Hutchinson Cancer Research Center
- Thesis: Absorption of pteroylglutamic acid and pteroylpolyglutamic acid in women with a history of neural tube defect affected pregnancies vs. controls (1996)

Marian L. Neuhouser is an American epidemiologist who is the Head of Cancer Prevention at the Fred Hutchinson Cancer Center. Her research focuses on the role of nutrition in the prevention of cancer.

== Early life and education ==
Neuhouser studied community nutrition at the University of California. She moved to the University of Washington for doctoral research, where she studied pteroyl-L-glutamic acid in patients with neural tube defect affected pregnancies.

== Research and career ==
Neuhouser's research considers the impact of nutrition on cancer and other diet-related diseases. She studies how scientists track diet and physical activity in patient groups. These studies typically rely on data collected using food journals, which are prone to measurement error. Neuhouser has developed metabolic approaches to study food intake. She studied the impact of red and processed meat on cancer risk. She showed that it had positive associations with certain cancers (e.g. breast and colorectal cancer), coronary heart disease and other cardiovascular conditions. However, the positive associations disappeared when controlling for other variables that were part of a high fat diet (e.g. saturated fat and sodium).

Neuhouser found that if women gain more than 5% of their body weight they have a higher risk of breast cancer, and that the risk does not change if they lose the weight. She showed that women with BMIs over 30 had a 58% higher risk of breast cancer than people of normal weight.

== Publications ==
- Amy F Subar; Laurence S Freedman; Janet A Tooze; et al. (14 October 2015). "Addressing Current Criticism Regarding the Value of Self-Report Dietary Data". Journal of Nutrition. 145 (12): 2639–2645. doi:10.3945/jn.115.219634. ISSN 0022-3166. PMC 4656907. PMID 26468491. Wikidata Q31005359.
- Brandon L Pierce; Rachel Ballard-Barbash; Leslie Bernstein; et al. (26 May 2009). "Elevated biomarkers of inflammation are associated with reduced survival among breast cancer patients". Journal of Clinical Oncology. 27 (21): 3437–3444. doi:10.1200/jco.2008.18.9068. ISSN 0732-183X. PMC 2717751. PMID 19470939. Wikidata Q37280710.
- Marian L Neuhouser (1 January 2004). "Dietary flavonoids and cancer risk: evidence from human population studies". Nutrition and Cancer. 50 (1): 1–7. doi:10.1207/s15327914nc5001_1. ISSN 0163-5581. PMID 15572291. Wikidata Q34372348.
