= Ernesto Contreras =

Ernesto Contreras may refer to:

- Ernesto Contreras (physician) (1915–2003), Mexican doctor
- Ernesto Contreras (cyclist) (1937–2020), Argentinian Olympic cyclist
- Ernesto Contreras (director) (born 1969), Mexican film director and screenwriter
