= Apple Cider Vinegar (TV series) =

2025 series about fraudster Belle Gibson

- Release poster
- Genre: Crime drama
- Created by: Samantha Strauss
- Based on: The Woman Who Fooled the World by Beau Donelly and Nick Toscano
- Written by: Samantha Strauss; Anya Beyersdorf; Angela Betzien
- Directed by: Jeffrey Walker
- Starring: Kaitlyn Dever; Alycia Debnam-Carey; Aisha Dee; Tilda Cobham-Hervey; Mark Coles Smith; Ashley Zukerman; Susie Porter; Matt Nable; Catherine McClements; Essie Davis; Edwina Wren; Chai Hansen; Richard Davies; Kieran Darcy-Smith
- Composer: Cornel Wilczek
- Country of origin: Australia
- Original language: English
- No. of episodes: 6

Production
- Executive producers: Helen Gregory; Iain Canning; Liz Watts; Emile Sherman; Samantha Strauss; Louise Gough; Kaitlyn Dever
- Producer: Yvonne Collins
- Production locations: Melbourne, Australia
- Running time: 55–65 minutes
- Production companies: See-Saw Films; Picking Scabs

Original release
- Network: Netflix
- Release: 6 February 2025

Apple Cider Vinegar is a 2025 Australian drama television limited series, released on Netflix and produced by See-Saw Films, based on the 2017 book The Woman Who Fooled the World by journalists Beau Donelly and Nick Toscano. The series stars Kaitlyn Dever and Alycia Debnam-Carey (playing wellness guru Belle Gibson and Milla Blake, respectively), who use their platforms to promote alternative medicine. Gibson fools her online following (and the world) with a fake cancer diagnosis, while Milla convinces her mother to join her in eschewing scientifically prescribed medical treatment. The series received generally positive reviews.

== Premise ==
The show follows Belle Gibson as she commits fraud by pretending to have cancer to promote alternative medicine. Gibson launches a wellness recipe app and cookbook, but soon her lies are uncovered.

== Cast ==
- Kaitlyn Dever as Belle Gibson
- Alycia Debnam-Carey as Milla Blake (based on Jessica Ainscough)
- Aisha Dee as Chanelle, Milla's friend and Belle's assistant
- Tilda Cobham-Hervey as Lucy, cancer patient and fan of Belle
- Mark Coles Smith as Justin Guthrie, Lucy's husband
- Ashley Zukerman as Clive, Belle's partner
- Phoenix Raei as Hek, crisis manager
- Susie Porter as Tamara, Milla's mother
- Matt Nable as Joe, Milla's dad
- Catherine McClements as Julie, Belle's book publisher
- Essie Davis as Natalie, Belle's mother
- Chai Hansen as Arlo, Milla's partner
- Richard Davies as Sean (a reporter working alongside Justin)
- Edwina Wren as Fiona, the mother of the brain cancer-illed boy.
- Kieran Darcy-Smith as Andrew Dal-Bello
- Doris Younane as Dr. Chidiac
- Sibylla Budd as Tara Brown (60 minutes reporter for Channel 9)
- Jeremy Stanford as Dr. Walsh
- Kate Lister as Jordan
- Victoria Eagger as Nurse Victoria
- Thom Green as Lenny
- Maude Davey as Margaret

== Episodes ==
No.	Title	Directed by	Written by	Original release date
1	"Toxic"	Jeffrey Walker	Samantha Strauss	6 February 2025
Belle Gibson, a wellness influencer, claims to have overcome terminal brain cancer thanks to alternative medicine, but is eventually exposed. In 2015, Belle talks with crisis manager Hek to salvage her ruined reputation, arguing that she was envied by her ex-friend Milla (a true cancer survivor) and confessing that she struggles to be accepted by society. The episode jumps between different time periods: in 2013, Belle launches her health app while her fan Lucy faces breast cancer; in 2014, Belle publishes a book while her former manager Chanelle plans to expose her; and in 2010, Belle, pregnant and suffering from social isolation, pretends to have cancer in an online forum for attention.
2	"Clean Sheets"	Jeffrey Walker	Samantha Strauss	6 February 2025
After Belle gives birth to her son, she struggles financially, starts an online business, and starts an affair with IT technician Clive. Meanwhile, Milla is sent by her mother to the Hirsch Institute, a Mexican hospital that rejects traditional treatments and uses Gerson Therapy on cancer patients. In 2011, Belle attends the launch of Milla's book telling her story of overcoming cancer, and notes her increasing influence and fame. Clive becomes suspicious of Belle when he discovers she was lying about going to chemotherapy sessions. In 2014, Chanelle feels guilty for introducing Belle to real cancer patients and wants to expose her, so Lucy's husband Justin and his co-worker Sean start digging into Belle's digital footprint for proof of deceit. Approaching her doctor, he confirms that Belle is lying about the cancer and offers to help the investigation. In 2015, Belle manages to convince Hek to defend her.
3	"Pink Dolphins"	Jeffrey Walker	Samantha Strauss	6 February 2025
In 2012, Clive finances the development of Belle's app The Whole Pantry, showcasing healthy recipes, and she suffers a miscarriage. Meanwhile, Milla establishes herself as a wellness influencer, launching a skincare line. Once the app becomes a success, Belle wants to make a cookbook out of it, and after forcing a meeting with Milla's book publisher Julie, wins her sympathy. In 2013, Milla deals with how her sick mother Tamara insists on only getting alternative treatments for her cancer, and Milla and Belle run for an entrepreneurship award. Belle wins, and an intrigued Milla investigates her and discovers she had moments pretending to be sick as a teenager, faking a heart attack and claiming to have leukemia. In 2014, Justin and Sean find out Belle did not pay collaborators and plagiarized content in her book. In 2015, Hek arranges an interview for Belle, who ignores his advice and lies during it. Once the interviewer confronts Belle about her stories and says they sought her mother for information, Belle gets angry and has a tantrum.
4	"Mama Aya"	Jeffrey Walker	Anya Beyersdorf	6 February 2025
In 2013, Belle convinces Milla's friend Chanelle to get away from her and become her manager. In 2014, Milla struggles to sell her juice line and takes her mother to the Hirsch Institute, with Tamara collapsing on the way to Mexico. Belle strikes a deal with Apple and launches a campaign to support a child with cancer that she met, Hunter. Once Clive travels to tend for his sick father, Belle gets overwhelmed at taking care of her son, ultimately realizing he is sick. She asks for the intervention of the eccentric Dr. Phil, who diagnoses Belle with liver cancer. During her son's birthday party, Belle argues with Clive, who finally confronts her for her lies, while Chanelle gets suspicious of Dr. Phil and discovers Belle kept food that Chanelle had cooked to Hunter for herself. Belle fakes having a seizure in front of her son. In 2015, Lucy goes to a retreat in Peru, facing physical and psychological challenges.
5	"Casseroles"	Jeffrey Walker	Angela Betzien	6 February 2025
In 2015, Belle's mother Natalie gives an interview calling her daughter an opportunist, making her angry. In 2014, after Belle's seizure, Chanelle discovers Tamara died and has an emotional collapse. Clive tries to take Belle to the hospital, and she manipulates the situation to make him not do so and keep Clive under her control, exploiting how much he cares for her son. After an argument with Chanelle, Belle thinks about revealing the truth on her app, but instead lies that more cancers have appeared, while announcing the book and promising to donate most of The Whole Pantry's profits to both health organizations and Hunter's family. Already devastated by her mother's death, Milla discovers the alternative treatments made her condition worse, as the cancer spread to various organs and she has only three months to live. Julie starts to suspect Belle for her answers and behavior in a simulated interview. At the book launch, Belle makes a speech that culminates with her singing "Roar", while Chanelle leaves in disgust. Once Justin and Sean uncover proof that Belle had embezzled money that was supposed to be sent to Hunter, they confront her with an e-mail. Belle receives it during a flight, leading her to scream in panic.
6	"Tapeworm"	Jeffrey Walker	Samantha Strauss	6 February 2025
In 2015, Belle lies in an interview, and Hek uses that to remember a suspicious story she had told about expelling a tapeworm from her nose after drinking apple cider vinegar. In 2014, Belle arrives uninvited to Milla's funeral, making a scene that makes everyone uncomfortable. During the funeral, Hunter's mother Fiona calls Belle charging her for the donation, and her excuses lead Fiona to realize the journalists were correct about the fraud claims. After sneaking into Milla's childhood bedroom, Belle tries to facetiously comfort her widower Arlo, who kicks her out. Justin publishes a story on Belle's charity frauds. Belle victimizes herself online, and while she starts with public support, the tide turns against her once people start questioning her finances. Lucy and doctors request proof of Belle's cancer, leading Sean to publish an exposé about her faked disease. Julie takes The Whole Pantry book off the shelves, Belle is expelled after trying to invade Apple's headquarters, and Clive decides that in spite of all that happened he needs to stay with Belle, afraid of what would happen if she tries raising her son alone. Desperate, Belle decides to do a fresh start in Beverly Hills and schedules an interview with 60 Minutes Australia, where she has a disastrous, contradictory performance. Justin comforts Fiona, who cannot afford further treatment for Hunter, and decides to fully support Lucy as she goes after traditional cancer treatments.

== Production ==
Samantha Strauss created Apple Cider Vinegar and wrote the series with Anya Beyersdorf and Angela Betzien. The series is based on the 2017 book The Woman Who Fooled the World by journalists Beau Donelly and Nick Toscano. All episodes are directed by Jeffrey Walker, while Walker and executives at production companies See-Saw Films and Picking Scabs, along with Dever, serve as executive producers.

On 15 December 2023, it was announced that the series had gone into production. The series filmed in and around Melbourne, Australia with funding secured from Screen Australia and VicScreen.

The trailer was released on 19 November 2024. A second trailer for the series was released on 16 January 2025, with a release date of 6 February 2025.

== Reception ==
On the review aggregator website Rotten Tomatoes, 84% of 61 critics' reviews are positive. The website's consensus reads: "Coating its tart tale in a sugary veneer, Apple Cider Vinegar's indictment of snake oil influencers finds a memorable avatar in Kaitlyn Dever's crisp performance." Metacritic, which uses a weighted average, assigned the series a score of 70 out of 100, based on 26 critics, indicating "generally favorable" reviews.

== Awards and nominations ==
Year	Award	Category	Recipient(s)	Result	Ref.
2025	Astra TV Awards	Best Actress in a Limited Series or TV Movie	Kaitlyn Dever	Nominated	
2025	Logie Awards	Best Miniseries or Telemovie	Apple Cider Vinegar	Won	
2025	Logie Awards	Best Lead Actress in a Drama	Alycia Debnam-Carey	Nominated	
2025	Logie Awards	Best Lead Actress in a Drama	Kaitlyn Dever	Nominated	
2025	Logie Awards	Best Supporting Actor	Ashley Zukerman	Nominated	
2025	Logie Awards	Best Supporting Actor	Mark Coles Smith	Nominated	
2025	Logie Awards	Best Supporting Actor	Matt Nable	Nominated	
2025	Logie Awards	Best Supporting Actress	Aisha Dee	Nominated	
2025	Logie Awards	Best Supporting Actress	Tilda Cobham-Hervey	Nominated	
2026	AWGIE Awards	Television – Limited Series	Samantha Strauss, Angela Betzien, and Anya Beyersdorf	Pending	
