= Ashley Kirilow =

Canadian cancer fraudster

Ashley Anne Kirilow
- Kirilow before and after altering her appearance
- Born: 1987 (age 38–39)
- Occupation: unknown
- Known for: Claiming to have cancer to defraud donors

Ashley Anne Kirilow (born 1987) is a Canadian woman who raised money to aid cancer patients while pretending to have cancer herself. When Kirilow's fraud was made public, her story was republished around the world. Since her case became public, Kirilow's fraud has been cited as a cautionary example of the dangers posed by online fundraising campaigns.

== Medical condition ==
In 2008 or 2009, Kirilow discovered a lump in her breast. The lump was benign and was successfully removed but Kirilow began telling people it was malignant. According to the Toronto Sun, psychotherapist Marc Feldman, a professor of psychiatry at the University of Alabama, suggested the kind of lies Kirilow told are often a sign an individual is manifesting Münchausen Syndrome by internet.

Kirilow was one of the examples of a mentally ill suspect offered in the textbook Criminal Profiling: An Introduction to Behavioral Evidence Analysis. When she was sentenced, in April 2011, as part of his explanation for her relatively lenient sentence, Justice Fred Forsyth noted how young her biological parents were when she was born.

== Legal status ==
Kirilow was charged with several counts of fraud with one count of fraud of over $5,000. Kirilow and her supporters report receiving death threats.

In November 2010, Kirilow pled guilty to defrauding Donna Michalowski, a woman who had raised almost $7,400 for Kirilow. She surrendered to the police on August 6, 2010.

Kirilow appeared several times in bail court during her first weeks in custody. Newspapers quoted former friends who explained that no one would post bail for her because everyone felt hurt and angry. Kirilow's father explained that he had considered posting her bail, but had decided that she had lied too many times. On August 20, 2011, a recognizance of $5,000 was pledged, and she was released on bail with supervision by the John Howard Society.

The Winnipeg Free Press reported that Kirilow received a conditional sentence, without any jail time. Kirilow was sentenced to 10 months of house arrest, followed by five months where she would have a curfew.

=== Further legal issues ===
Kirilow was arrested by a grocery store security guard on October 7, 2011 for attempting to steal $11 worth of cold medicine. She pled guilty two weeks later to theft under $5,000. She was sentenced to one further day in jail. Kirilow was still serving her conditional sentence from her fraud conviction when she stole from the grocery store.

On November 10, 2011, she received an additional 30 days in jail for breaching terms of her conditional sentence. Both the Toronto Sun and The Hamilton Spectator speculated that Kirilow's last conviction was a sign that underlying mental health issues were not being addressed.

=== Second accusation of parole violations ===
The Hamilton Spectator and CHCH TV reported that Kirilow appeared in court on February 8, 2012, for a second breach of her parole conditions.

On March 2, 2012, The Hamilton Spectator confirmed that her conditional sentence had been revoked.

== Fundraising activities ==
Kirilow's Facebook page described a charity she said she set up, entitled Change for the Cure. Kirilow visited children in hospital receiving cancer treatment and appeared at benefit concerts organized on her behalf.

Commentators speculated about the effect her Facebook fraud would have on other charities' online donations.

On October 13, 2010, Linda Nguyen reported on the efforts to raise funds for experimental treatment for Alexis Wronzberg, a young Toronto area woman who has a rare form of leukemia.

Kirilow has offered the explanation that she pretended to have cancer in order to make her family pay for an unhappy childhood. Kirilow's parents divorced when she was young.

In addition to the funds she solicited, she accepted a vacation at Disney World from a charity that sponsored visits to the resort from those who were at risk of dying. Skateboard personality Rob Dyer's organization Skate4Cancer financed Kirilow's trip to Disney World.

== Background ==
According to reports, Kirilow was working as a receptionist at the Sutton Group Results Realty Inc. office in September 2008. She later told her co-workers that she had been diagnosed with cancer. Michalowski organized a fundraiser in February 2009 at the Burlington bar Club 54. The fundraiser collected $7000.

Kirilow is also accused of raising thousands of dollars for her own benefit through a charity called "Change for the Cure" on Facebook. She had supposedly created the charity to fund cancer research. Kirilow told the Toronto Star that she had lied about being terminally ill.

Kirilow was released under the supervision of the John Howard Society.

She faced three additional charges of fraud under $5,000 at her November 1 appearance. She pled guilty to the one charge of fraud over $599. After her court appearance, trying to explain the attention Kirilow's case received, the lawyer said:

It's the perfect storm. You've got social networking ... you've got an insidious disease, which almost everyone in our society is touched with. When you put all those factors together there's a public outcry.

== Kirilow mentioned in the context of similar frauds ==
On November 5, 2010, the week that Kirilow pleaded guilty, Ontario Police announced the arrest of Jessica Ann Leeder, a 21-year-old Huntsville, Ontario woman, who is also accused of using Facebook to solicit funds to treat a non-existent cancer.

In December 2011, Maclean's magazine listed Kirilow in a year-end summary article subtitled, "From Norway gunman Anders Behring Breivik to cancer fraudster Ashley Kirilow: portraits of evil".

In 2012 and 2013, her case was compared with that of 29-year-old Calgary resident Kristopher Nicholas Cook, who falsely claimed to have brain cancer.

In 2013, Kirilow's case was compared with that of 35-year-old mother of three LeAnn Gorchinsky-Gripper, who falsely claimed she had ovarian cancer.

== See also ==
- Belle Gibson
- Michael Guglielmucci cancer scandal
- Munchausen syndrome
