= Skate4Cancer =

Canadian-American cancer advocacy foundation

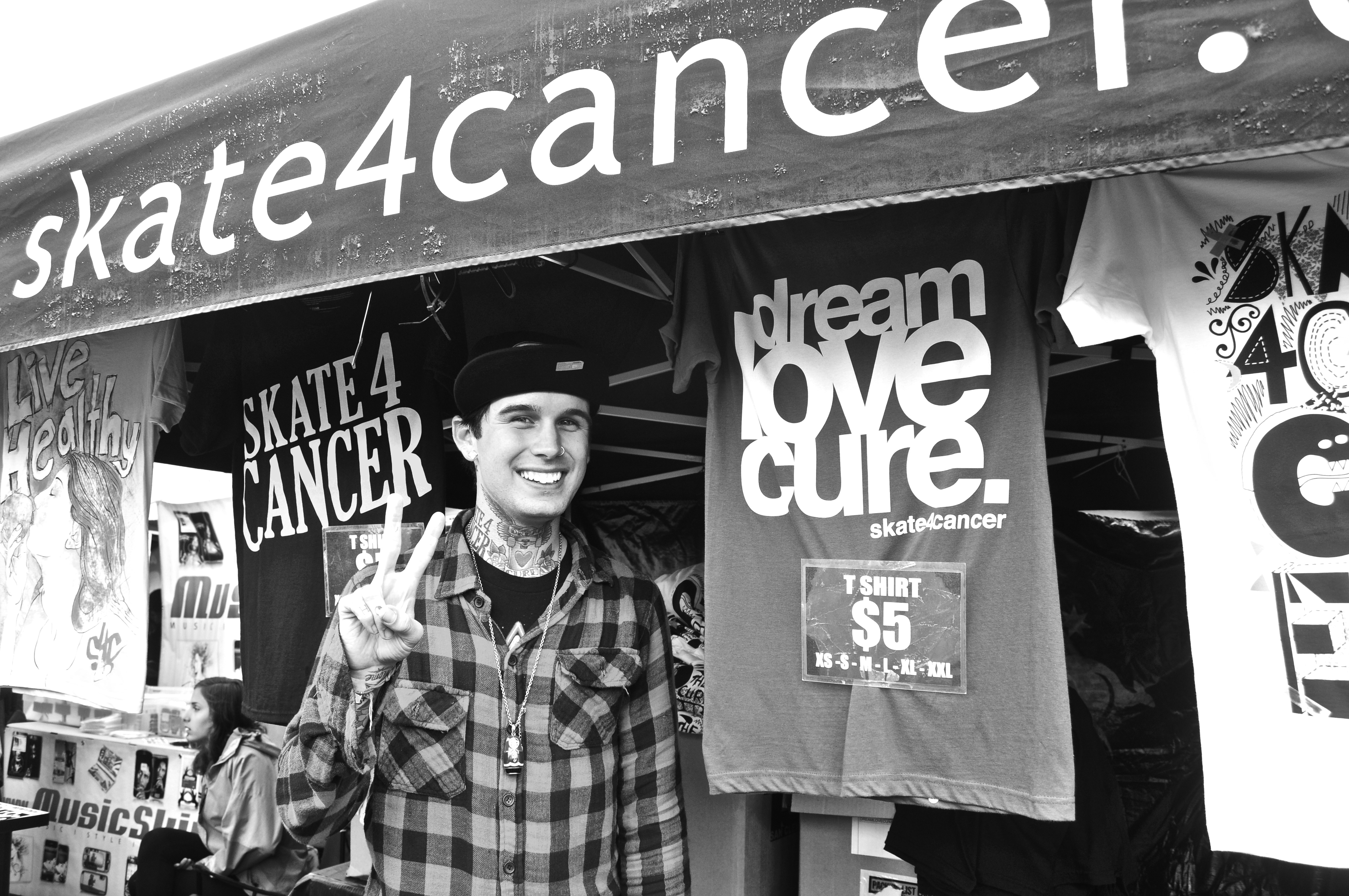
Rob Dyer in front of a booth for Skate4Cancer

Skate4Cancer (later known as DreamLoveCure) was a cancer advocacy foundation started by Canadian Rob Dyer in 2004. Skate4Cancer focused on raising awareness for various cancers, cancer screening, and preventative care.

== Creation and Skateboard Marathons ==
In 2004, Dyer lost a friend, and his paternal grandmother to stomach cancer, along with his maternal grandmother and mother to brain cancer all within a span of six months. Dyer cites this often as the catalyst for his first skateboard marathon to raise awareness for cancer.

In 2004, Dyer, at only 19, began his first skate marathon from Los Angeles, California to Newmarket, Ontario, a total distance of roughly 8,000 km. Shortly after embarking, Skate4Cancer lost one of its major sponsors due to lack of publicity.

During this marathon, Dyer and his support crew were stopped by law enforcement for skating on interstate highways, and being redirected around towns. These unforeseen issues added considerable distance to the marathon, causing Dyer to hit 8,000 km before getting to Newmarket. Dyer suffered a stress fracture to his ankle, and was forced to end the marathon early. This initial marathon raised below $100,000 for The Cancer Society and the Princess Margaret Hospital.

Four years later in 2008, Skate4Cancer organized another cross country skate, this time from Vancouver, British Columbia to Halifax, Nova Scotia, with a total distance of 7,500 km. Skate4Cancer started the skate in June 2008, and finished four months later in November.

The next Skate4Cancer marathon took place in early 2010, this time in New Zealand and Australia. During the Australia portion of the marathon, Dyer was hit by a car while skating, and was unable to continue skating due to a groin injury sustained in the accident. Several members of the support crew needed treatment for heat stroke.

After the accident and heat stroke incident, Skate4Cancer cancelled the remainder of the New Zealand and Australia marathon. Skate4cancer skated a total of 3667 km before returning to Canada.

In 2011, Dyer and Skate4Cancer started a new marathon across France, and completed within three months. That same year, Skate4Cancer secured a sponsorship from West 49, and raised over $100,000 from donations and t-shirt sales to support Wellspring Cancer Support.

Major sponsors of Skate4Cancer included Element Skateboards, and Circa Shoes, which supported Dyer's plans for a cross-Canada tour of colleges and universities to provide students with cancer prevention information.

== 2009 Ashley Kirilow scam ==
Ashley Kirilow, before and during pretending to have cancer

In 2009, Skate4Cancer was one of several cancer awareness and advocacy organizations scammed by Ashley Kirilow. Kirilow shaved her head, eyebrows, and starved herself to appear as though she was undergoing chemotherapy treatments, and frequently used Facebookto update her nearly 4,000 followers on her condition. Kirilow began the scam in 2008, after having a benign tumor removed from her breast.

Kirilow created a fake charity called "Change for a Cure" (sometimes referenced as "Change for the Cure"), which was never registered as a nonprofit and collected nearly $20,000.

Kirilow contacted Skate4Cancer, who flew her to Disney World after stating it was her final wish.

Skate4Cancer sent out a statement after allegations came forward about Kirilow, stating: "For your peace of mind, Skate4Cancer has no formal or informal affiliation to Change For A Cure. There have been no jointly held events or fundraising initiatives. Skate4Cancer's involvement with Ms. Kirilow was based solely on fulfilling what the organization believed to be a legitimate final wish from a terminally ill individual."

== The Cure is Knowledge tour ==
The Cure is Knowledge Tour was another cancer awareness effort by Skate4Cancer, focused on raising awareness for cancer prevention through the music industry. Started in 2008, The Cure is Knowledge Tour organized concerts with local bands and artists for free concerts across Canada, with an emphasis on hip hop, hardcore punk, rock, and indie rock bands.

Musicians that supported The Cure is Knowledge Tour included Shad, Alexisonfire, Billy Talent, Cancer Bats, City and Colour, Moneen, Silverstein, All Time Low, and Lights. The Cure is Knowledge Tour also frequently worked with festivals like NXNE, SCENE Fest and Warped Tour under the Skate4Cancer logo, adding to their visibility.

In 2007, Skate4Cancer organized their own live music event in Winnipeg, marketed as Skate4Cancer Winnipeg. Money raised was donated to the Health Sciences Centre. The event was canceled after their 2013 event, citing lack of funding.

In the fall of 2013, Skate4Cancer opened their first pop-up shop in Toronto, where clothing was sold to support Wellspring.ca and movember.com. Over $20,000 was raised as a result of the fundraiser.

== Dream.Love.Cure Centre ==
In 2011, Rob Dyer announced his plan to create a children's cancer support centre called Dream Love Cure. Dream Love Cure, intended to be a place to support children "indirectly or directly impacted by the disease [cancer]."

In a 2014 blog, Skate4Cancer stated they would not be opening the Dream Love Cure Centre after Wellspring, a Canadian cancer support foundation and frequent partner organization, was starting their own youth-oriented support group.
