= Burzynski Clinic =

American purveyor of unproven cancer treatments

Coordinates: 29°47′11″N 95°31′30″W

Geography
- Location: Houston, Harris County, Texas, United States

Organization
- Care system: Private
- Type: Specialist clinic
- Religious affiliation: None

History
- Opened: 1976

Links
- Website: burzynskiclinic.com
- Lists: Hospitals in Texas

The Burzynski Clinic is an American clinic selling an unproven cancer treatment, which has been characterized as harmful quackery. It was founded in 1976 and is located in Houston, Texas, in the United States. It offers a form of chemotherapy originally called "antineoplaston therapy" devised by the clinic's founder Stanislaw Burzynski in the 1970s. Antineoplaston is Burzynski's term for a group of urine-derived peptides, peptide derivatives, and mixtures. There is no accepted scientific evidence of benefit from antineoplaston combinations for various diseases, and the Clinic's claimed successes have not been replicated by independent researchers. The therapy has been rebranded in various ways over the years to mirror fashions in medicine, for example as a kind of "immunotherapy". The therapy is administered through the ruse of running a large numbers of clinical trials, which long-time Burzynski lawyer Richard Jaffe described as "a joke".

The clinic has been the focus of criticism primarily due to the way its antineoplaston therapy is promoted, the costs for people with cancer participating in trials of antineoplastons and problems with the way these trials are run. Legal cases have been brought as a result of the sale of the therapy without regulatory approval.

Burzynski is also the president and founder of a pharmaceutical company, the Burzynski Research Institute, which manufactures his antineoplaston drugs.

== Stanislaw Burzynski ==
Stanislaw Burzynski
- Born: Stanislaw Rajmund Burzynski; 1943 (age 82–83)
- Education: Medical Academy in Lublin, Poland (1967); Ph.D. in biochemistry (1968)
- Spouse: Barbara Burzynski (d. 2021)
- Children: 3;

Stanislaw Rajmund Burzynski was born in 1943. In 1967, Burzynski graduated from the Medical Academy in Lublin, Poland. In 1968, he received another degree. Burzynski claims this degree was a Ph.D. in biochemistry, but cancer researcher Saul Green found evidence indicating he received a D.Msc. (Doctor of Medical Science) after a one-year project and passage of a test.

Burzynski moved to the United States in 1970 and worked at Baylor College of Medicine until 1977. That year, he established the Burzynski Research Laboratory, where he began administering so-called antineoplaston therapy. Initially, the protocol was administered to 21 patients, but it was later offered more widely as an "experimental" therapy. This opened him up to "charges of unethical conduct and to the suspicion he had become a merchant of false hope", which led to several instances of media controversy.

Burzynski incorporated his pharmaceutical company, the Burzynski Research Institute, in 1984. Reviewers of his scientific papers have disputed the design of the trials and scientific validity of the published results.

In February 2017, following lengthy hearings, the Texas Medical Board recommended Burzynski's medical license be revoked, with the revocation suspended, and a fine of $360,000 for billing irregularities and other violations.

Burzynski was married to Barbara Burzynski, also a physician, until her death in 2021. They had three children, including Gregory Burzynski, a physician. Both Gregory and Barbara became board members of the Burzynski Research Institute and worked at the Burzynski Clinic.

== Antineoplaston therapy ==
Antineoplaston is a name coined by Burzynski for a group of peptides, peptide derivatives, and mixtures that he uses as an alternative cancer treatment. The word is derived from neoplasm. A Reuters fact-check concluded that "Online claims that the drugs are a cancer 'cure' and that any of them has been FDA-approved, are misleading."

Although the therapy is promoted as natural and benign, it is in reality a form of chemotherapy with harmful side effects including severe neurotoxicity.

Though Burzynski first injected patients with his peptides in 1977, antineoplastons have never been approved for general use. The compounds are not licensed as drugs but are instead sold and administered as part of clinical trials at the Burzynski Clinic and the Burzynski Research Institute.

Burzynski stated that he began investigating the use of antineoplastons after detecting what he considered significant differences in the presence of peptides between the blood of cancer patients and a control group. He first identified antineoplastons from human blood. Since similar peptides had been isolated from urine, early batches of Burzynski's treatment were isolated from urine. Burzynski has since produced the compounds synthetically.

The first active peptide fraction identified was called antineoplaston A-10 (3-phenylacetylamino-2,6-piperidinedione). From A-10, antineoplaston AS2-1 was derived – a 4:1 mixture of phenylacetic acid and phenylacetylglutamine. The Burzynski Clinic website states that the active ingredient of antineoplaston A10-I is phenylacetylglutamine.

Since 2011, the clinic has marketed itself as offering "personalized gene-targeted cancer therapy", which has stirred further controversy. David Gorski argues that the concept of "personalised cancer therapy" is "more of a marketing term than a scientifically meaningful description". According to Gorski, a research oncologist, it appears unlikely that the Burzynski clinic would indeed be able to actually personalise gene-targeting therapies, i.e., "identify who would benefit from specific targeted therapies simply from blood tests," as Burzynski claims, since there are no proven methods to achieve this. Consequently, many reject Burzynski's claim of offering personalized medicine, because in reality his patients are administered untested combinations of various approved and unapproved medications, without a sound rationale for a given combination and without "any concern for potential adverse reactions".

As of 2023 the Clinic refreshed the branding of its offering to include the word "immunotherapy" in an attempt to leverage the popular excitement around cancer immunotherapy. The treatment however remains the same, using antineoplastons.

=== Clinical trials ===
According to the National Cancer Institute, as of August 2019, "no phase III randomized, controlled trials of antineoplastons as a treatment for cancer have been conducted. Publications have taken the form of case reports, phase I clinical trials, toxicity studies, and phase II clinical trials", and "for the most part, these publications have been authored by the developer of the therapy, Dr. Burzynski, in conjunction with his associates at the Burzynski Clinic. Although these studies often report remissions, other investigators have not been successful in duplicating these results."

From 1991 to 1995, the NCI initiated multiple phase II trials of antineoplastons. In 1995, after over $1 million had been spent on these trials, they were stopped due to fundamental conflicts between NCI investigators and Burzynski and his employees, notably around Burzynski's insistence on approving all protocols in the NCI trial.

Since the mid-1990s, Burzynski registered some sixty clinical trials of antineoplastons and, in December 2010, a Phase III trial that did not open for patient recruitment. The results of these trials are seldom published in reputable journals, and the few that have been do not confirm the worth of the clinic's treatments. The aim of registering so many trials, according to the 2008 book of long-time Burzynski lawyer Richard Jaffe, was to allow for treating any cancer Burzynski might want to treat.

The largest trial Burzynski registered was called CAN-1 and aimed to cover all clinic patients at that time. Jaffe wrote that CAN-1 was "a joke" of a clinical trial and explained the legal maneuvering:

The CAN-1 protocol had almost two hundred patients in it and there were at least a dozen different types of cancers being treated. And since all the patients were already on treatment, there could not be any possibility of meaningful data coming out of the so-called clinical trial. It was all an artifice, a vehicle we and the FDA created to legally give the patients Burzynski's treatment. The FDA wanted all of Burzynski's patients to be on an IND [Investigational New Drug (IND) Application], so that's what we did.

All trials were paused (no new patients allowed) following a 2013 FDA inspection which found (for the third consecutive time) significant issues with his Institutional Review Board, and, according to reporting published in November 2013, substantial issues with the conduct of both the clinic and Burzynski as principal investigator.

=== Efficacy ===
Although Burzynski and his associates claim success in the use of antineoplaston combinations for the treatment of various diseases, and some of the clinic's patients say they have been helped, there is no clinical evidence of the efficacy of these methods. The consensus among the professional community, as represented by the American Cancer Society and Cancer Research UK is that antineoplaston therapy is unproven, and the overall probability of the treatment turning out to be as claimed is low due to lack of credible mechanisms and the poor state of research after more than 35 years of investigation. Antineoplaston treatments have significant known side effects including severe neurotoxicity. Hypernatremia is also a significant risk given the high levels of sodium in antineoplaston infusions.

Independent scientists have been unable to reproduce the positive results reported in Burzynski's studies: NCI observed that researchers other than Burzynski and his associates have not been successful in duplicating his results, and Cancer Research UK states that "available scientific evidence does not support claims that antineoplaston therapy is effective in treating or preventing cancer."

There is no convincing evidence from randomized controlled trials in the scientific literature that antineoplastons are useful treatments of cancer, and the U.S. Food and Drug Administration (FDA) has not approved these products for the treatment of any disease. The American Cancer Society has stated since 1983 that there is no evidence that antineoplastons have any beneficial effects on cancer and recommended that people not buy these products since there could be serious health consequences. A 2004 medical review described antineoplaston treatment as a "disproven therapy".

In 1998, three oncologists were enlisted by the weekly Washington newsletter The Cancer Letter to conduct independent reviews of Burzynski's clinical trial research on antineoplastons. They concluded that the studies were poorly designed, not interpretable, and "so flawed that it cannot be determined whether it really works". One of them characterized the research as "scientific nonsense". In addition to questioning Burzynski's research methods, the oncologists found significant and possibly life-threatening toxicity in some patients treated with antineoplastons.

In 2018 an article in The Lancet Oncology said "This quackery has continued for 40 years and caused serious harm to desperate patients. Enough is enough!".

=== Cost ===
According to the American Cancer Society, "Treatment can cost from $7,000 to $9,500 per month or more, depending on the type of treatment, number of consultations, and the need for surgery to implant a catheter for drug delivery. Available information suggests that health insurance plans often do not reimburse costs linked to this treatment." As of March 2015, the Burzynski Clinic required patients to provide a deposit before treatment starts, and their website informed patients that "Since we are classified as 'out of network' we are unable to accept Medicare, Medicaid and any HMO insurance."

Recent criticism has focused on the use of crowdfunding to raise the costs of quack treatments, including specifically hundreds of thousands of dollars in the case of the Burzynski Clinic.

== Legal issues ==
=== FDA warnings ===
In 1978, FDA representatives warned Burzynski that he was violating federal law because he was not administering antineoplastons in the context of a clinical trial. In 1981, FDA wrote in a letter, "the FDA advises persons who inquire about Burzynski's alleged cure that we do not believe the drug is fit for administration to humans and that there is no reason to believe Dr. Burzynski has discovered an effective cure for cancer."

In 1996, Burzynski's use and advertising of antineoplastons as an unapproved cancer therapy were deemed to be unlawful by the U.S. FDA and the Texas Attorney General, and limits on the sale and advertising of the treatment were imposed as a result.

In 2009, the FDA issued a warning letter to the Burzynski Research Institute, stating that an investigation had determined the Burzynski Institutional Review Board (IRB) "did not adhere to the applicable statutory requirements and FDA regulations governing the protection of human subjects." It identified a number of specific findings, among them that the IRB had approved research without ensuring risk to patients was minimized, had failed to prepare required written procedures or retain required documentation, and had failed to conduct required continuing reviews for studies, among others. The institute was given fifteen days to identify the steps it would take to prevent future violations.

Another warning issued in October 2012 notes that the Burzynski Clinic is advertising investigational drugs as being "safe and effective", noting:

Promotion of an investigational new drug is prohibited under FDA regulations at 21 CFR 312.7(a), which states, "A sponsor or investigator, or any person acting on behalf of a sponsor or investigator, shall not represent in a promotional context that an investigational new drug is safe or effective for the purposes for which it is under investigation or otherwise promote the drug. This provision is not intended to restrict the full exchange of scientific information concerning the drug, including dissemination of scientific findings in scientific or lay media. Rather, its intent is to restrict promotional claims of safety or effectiveness of the drug for a use for which it is under investigation and to preclude commercialization of the drug before it is approved for commercial distribution."

The websites, including the posted press releases and embedded videos, contain claims such as the following that promote Antineoplastons as safe and/or effective for the purposes for which they are being investigated or otherwise promote the drugs. [...] Since Antineoplastons are investigational new drugs, the products' indication(s), warnings, precautions, adverse reactions, and dosage and administration have not been established and are unknown at this time. Promoting Antineoplastons as safe and effective for the purposes for which they are under investigation, by making representations such as those noted above, is in violation of 21 CFR 312.7(a).

— FDA enforcement letter, Original

The letter requires cessation of non-compliant promotional activities, including the use of testimonials and promotional interviews with Burzynski himself.

In June 2012, antineoplaston trials were paused following the death of a child patient. In January and February 2013, the FDA inspected Burzynski and his IRB in Houston. In December 2013, the FDA issued its findings in warning letters to Burzynski, expressing "concerns about subject safety and data integrity, as well as concerns about the adequacy of safeguards in place at your site to protect patients...."

In November 2013 the FDA released the observational notes from an inspection of Burzynski as a principal investigator that took place between January and March 2013. Among the findings were "[failure] to comply with protocol requirements related to the primary outcome, therapeutic response [...], for 67% of study subjects reviewed during the inspection", admitting patients who failed to meet inclusion criteria, failing to stop treatment when patients had severe toxic reactions to antineoplastons, and failure to report all adverse events. Further, the FDA told Burzynski, "You failed to protect the rights, safety, and welfare of subjects under your care. Forty-eight (48) subjects experienced 102 investigational overdoses between January 1, 2005 and February 22, 2013 [...] There is no documentation to show that you have implemented corrective actions during this time period to ensure the safety and welfare of subjects." The FDA also observed that Burzynski had denied patients informed consent by not informing them of extra costs that they might incur during treatment and that he could not account for his stock of the investigational drug. Lastly, the FDA observed: "Your [...] tumor measurements initially recorded on worksheets at baseline and on-study treatment [...] studies for all study subjects were destroyed and are not available for FDA inspectional review", meaning that there was no way for the FDA to verify either initial tumor sizes or effects that the antineoplastons may have had.

In Burzynski's written response to the 2013 FDA investigation, he states that the investigators '"complied with all criteria for evaluation of response and made accurate assessments for tumor response."'

In December 2013, the FDA issued two warning letters, one to the Burzynski Institutional Review Board and one to Burzynski, the subjects of the investigations in February. The FDA found that Burzynski and the IRB had largely failed to address the concerns identified in the initial observation reports. The letter to Burzynski noted serious problems with medical files with respect to 6-year-old Josia Cotto, a young brain tumor patient who died while being treated by Burzynski with the sodium-rich antineoplastons and whose death apparently initiated the investigation. USA Today reported that Cotto's blood sodium was measured before his death at "a level that is typically fatal", but the Burzynski Clinic claimed that the measurement was erroneous.

On March 23, 2014, USA Today reported that the FDA had decided to permit "a handful" of cancer patients to receive Burzynski's treatment provided that the patients did not receive the treatment directly from him.

David Gorski wrote in 2014 that over four decades the FDA and state medical boards have been unable to shut down Burzynkski's business selling unproven treatments – "these organizations are supposed to protect the public from practitioners like Burzynski, but all too often they fail at their charges, in this case spectacularly."

The Burzynski Clinic has also made use of expanded access petitions, also known as compassionate use exemptions. According to an investigative report by STAT News published in August 2016, the clinic has benefited by politicians who lobbied the FDA to allow Burzynski to sell antineoplastons to families of patients with terminal diagnoses. According to FDA documents obtained by STAT, "From 2011 to 2016, 37 members of Congress wrote to the FDA about Burzynski. [...] Most of the lawmakers asked the agency to grant constituents 'compassionate use exemptions' so that they could try his unapproved drugs, or to allow his clinical trials to proceed." According to Burzynski, "interventions by lawmakers were helpful." According to STAT, critics state that "the congressional advocacy risks giving the terminally ill and their families a false sense of hope, while also conferring a measure of legitimacy on him that many believe he does not deserve."

However, FDA expanded access petitions were not always granted. Burzynski attempted to avoid FDA oversight by recruiting patients under Texas's "Right to try" law, which was passed in 2015.

=== Texas Medical Board ===
In December 2010, the use of chemotherapeutic agents by the clinic has been characterized as "random" and their use of unapproved combinations "with no known benefits but clear harms" by the Texas Medical Board, which regulates and licenses physicians in the state of Texas, led to a case against Burzynski by that board. Burzynski was acquitted because he had not personally written the prescriptions.

In July 2014, the board filed a 202-page complaint against Burzynski to the Texas State Office of Administrative Hearings. The complaint addressed allegations by the Board including misleading patients into paying exorbitant charges, misrepresenting unlicensed persons to patients as licensed medical doctors, and misleading patients into accepting care from providers without significant education or training related to cancer treatment. Citing examples of problems with 29 patients, which were listed in the document, the board said that "unapproved combinations of highly toxic chemotherapy" were prescribed "in ways that caused harm to several patients." In July 2015, Burzynski's counsel, Richard Jaffe, withdrew from the case citing a potential conflict of interest, a result of Jaffe's pursuing actions against Burzynski in bankruptcy court. With the addition of replacement counsel, the hearing was set to begin in November 2015.

In November 2015, the Texas Medical Board took Burzynski to court in Houston, Texas. Burzynski was accused of bait-and-switch tactics, improperly charging patients, not informing patients that he owns the pharmacy they were required to use to fill their medications, and of off-label prescribing of drugs. Burzynski's former attorney Richard Jaffe has filed suit in Federal Court claiming unpaid legal fees of over $250,000. Burzynski through his current attorney denied all charges.

On March 3, 2017, the Texas Medical Board sanctioned Burzynski, placing him on probation and fining him $40,000. After being sanctioned for over 130 violations, he was allowed to keep his medical license and to continue to practice. Staff recommendations had been more punitive. Probation terms included additional medical training, disclosure of the Board's ruling to patients and medical facilities, and monitoring of his patient records.

=== Lawsuits ===
In 1983, a federal court issued an injunction against Burzynski, barring him from shipping antineoplastons in interstate commerce without FDA approval. Burzynski continued to use antineoplastons and was charged with 75 federal counts of mail fraud and violations of federal drug laws. In 1994, a 20-day trial resulted in the dismissal of the 34 counts of mail fraud. On the other 41 counts, the jury deadlocked, failing to come to a verdict. In a separate administrative proceeding, the Texas State Board of Medical Examiners charged Burzynski with violations of Texas state law relating to his use of antineoplastons. An administrative law judge ruled that Burzynski violated a section of the Texas Health and Safety Code dealing with prescriptions for unapproved drugs. The Texas Court of Appeals ultimately upheld this determination in a 1996 decision.

In 1994, the United States Court of Appeals for the Fifth Circuit affirmed a lower court decision that Burzynski had defrauded a health insurance fund into reimbursing about $90,000 for antineoplaston treatment. The appeals court ruled that Burzynski "may not trick the plaintiff into paying for an unlawful, unapproved drug."

In 1998, a federal judge ordered that Burzynski repay an insurance company over $200,000 he charged six patients for his unapproved treatments. The judge concluded that Burzynski was "unjustly enriched" by the insurance payments, but that the violations did not rise to fraud or misrepresentation.

In 1998, the parents of a 10-year-old girl with brain cancer sued Burzynski for fraud, saying he had misled them about the efficacy of his treatments. The girl, Christina Bedient, died of cancer after being treated with antineoplastons in 1996. Burzynski settled the suit by refunding some of the family's expenses.

In December 2010, the Texas State Board of Medical Examiners filed a multi-count complaint in the Texas State Office of Administrative Hearings against Burzynski for failure to meet state medical standards. In November 2012, a Texas State Office of Administrative Hearings administrative law judge ruled that Burzynski was not vicariously liable under Texas administrative law for the actions of staff at the clinic.

In January 2012, Lola Quinlan, an elderly, stage IV cancer patient, sued Burzynski for using false and misleading tactics to "swindle her out of $100,000". She also sued his companies, The Burzynski Clinic, the Burzynski Research Institute, and Southern Family Pharmacy, in Harris County Court. She sued for negligence, negligent misrepresentation, fraud, deceptive trade and conspiracy. The case was dismissed after Quinlan died.

=== Legal threats to online critics ===
In November 2011, a music writer and editor for the British newspaper The Observer sought help raising £200,000 to have his 4-year-old niece, who was diagnosed with glioma, treated at the Burzynski Clinic. Several bloggers reported other cases of patients who had spent similar amounts of money on the treatment, and had died, and challenged the validity of Burzynski's treatments. Marc Stephens, identifying himself as a representative of the Burzynski Clinic, sent emails accusing them of libel and demanding that coverage of Burzynski be removed from their sites. One of the bloggers who received threatening e-mails from Stephens was Rhys Morgan, a 17-year-old sixth-form student from Cardiff, Wales, at the time, previously noted for exposing the Miracle Mineral Supplement. Another was Andy Lewis, a skeptic and publisher of the Quackometer blog.

Following the publicity fallout resulting from the legal threats made by Stephens against the bloggers, the Burzynski Clinic issued a press release on November 29, 2011, confirming that the Clinic had hired Stephens "to provide web optimization services and to attempt to stop the dissemination of false and inaccurate information concerning Dr. Burzynski and the Clinic", apologizing for comments made by Stephens to bloggers and for the posting of personal information, and announcing that Stephens "no longer has a professional relationship with the Burzynski Clinic."

The story, including the threats against the bloggers, was covered by the BMJ (formerly the British Medical Journal). The chief clinician at Cancer Research UK expressed his concern at the treatment offered, and Andy Lewis of Quackometer and science writer Simon Singh, who had previously been sued by the British Chiropractic Association, said that English libel law harms public discussion of science and medicine, and thus public health.

In an article in Skeptical Inquirer published in March 2014, skeptic Robert Blaskiewicz chronicled the activities by skeptics to investigate and challenge Burzynski's claim of cancer treatments. He claimed aggressive actions by Burzynski's supporters toward the critics, including contacting their employers, lodging complaints to state licensing boards and defamation. Blaskiewicz pointedly indicated that, although Burzynski had dismissed Marc Stephens, his clinic has not retracted the warnings of the possibility of lawsuits against critics, that it is "a threat that hangs over all of these activists every day".

== Media and commentary ==
- In 2010, Eric Merola, an art director of television commercials, released a film titled Burzynski: Cancer is Serious Business, that promotes the Clinic's claims and describes Burzynski's use of antineoplastons and his legal clashes with government agencies and regulators. In March 2013, Merola released a follow-up movie to Cancer is Serious Business. The Village Voice commented that the first movie "violates every basic rule of ethical filmmaking" and that by interviewing only Burzynski's supporters, the film's producer "is either unusually credulous, or doesn't understand the difference between a documentary and an advertisement". Variety described the film as having the qualities of a "paranoid conspiracy theory" and likened it to the National Enquirer, adding that the film's explanatory diagrams are "simplistic to the point of idiocy". The Variety review concluded that "despite its infotainment look, Burzynski ultimately proves convincing."
- In April 2013, Burzynski received the Pigasus Award, which is bestowed each April Fool's Day by the James Randi Educational Foundation (JREF) to "honor the five worst offenders who are intentionally or unintentionally peddling harmful paranormal and pseudoscientific nonsense." The Foundation cited as the basis for the award the high cost of antineoplaston treatments, the lack of controlled trials demonstrating efficacy, the lack of FDA approval on the treatments, the lack of published final results of any single clinical trial, and the existence of FDA warning letters concerning research method safety and possible rules violations impacting patient safety.
- In June 2013, the BBC's Panorama explored Burzynski in a documentary titled Curing cancer or 'selling hope' to the vulnerable? and argued "Burzynski exploits a legal loophole" by treating patients with antineoplastons "as part of a clinical trial, so the drug does not need a licence" for twenty years. The clinic complained to the Office of Communications (Ofcom) about the documentary, but the complaint was not upheld.
- In November 2013, an investigative report in USA Today by Liz Szabo accused Burzynski of selling "false hope to families" for years. In an interview with Reporting on Health, Szabo said that her interest in reporting on Burzynski was sparked when she emailed him with questions asking for a response to a book critical of him, and received a legal warning letter from his attorneys in reply.
- In August 2015, Burzynski was listed by the Houston Press as number 8 on a list of The 10 Most Embarrassing Houstonians accusing him of being "Truly an embarrassment to such a medical city where some of the best cancer medicine in the world is performed."

== See also ==
- Clinica 0-19
- Hallwang Clinic
- List of unproven and disproven cancer treatments
- Oasis of Hope Hospital
- Ty Bollinger
