= Sands Point Country Day School =

Defunct school in New York, United States

Coordinates: 40°51′26″N 73°41′24″W

Sands Point Country Day School (also known as Sands Point Academy) was an elementary and high school (K-12) located in Sands Point, New York, from 1954 to 1974. The school was started by Marie L. Fetsch as a summer school and went to full-year operation in 1961.

== Timeline ==
From 1962 to 1971, Benjamin Fine was headmaster of the school.

In the July 31, 1972 issue of New York magazine, a lengthy article by Nicholas Gonzalez raised serious questions about the integrity of the school and its founder.

In August, 1972, six families sued the school and its founder, alleging fraud.

The school was sold in 1973, operated for one year as Elm Court school, and closed in 1974.
