= Ian Gawler =

Australian author (born 1950)

- Born: 25 February 1950 (age 76); Melbourne, Victoria, Australia
- Education: Melbourne Grammar School
- Occupations: Author, therapist, former vet

Ian James Gawler OAM (born 25 February 1950) is an Australian author and a prominent advocate for the therapeutic application of mind-body medicine and meditation.

== Early life and career ==
Gawler was born in 1950 to Alan Gawler, an engineer, and Billie Gawler (née Gray) in Melbourne, Australia. After graduation from the University of Melbourne, he worked as a vet in a mixed practice at Bacchus Marsh and Melton, Victoria in 1973 with a special interest in horses and surgery.

== Illness, treatment and criticism ==
Gawler and his proponents have claimed that he was diagnosed with osteosarcoma in 1974, and that resultant surgery involved amputation through the hip. Later in 1975, he claimed that he was diagnosed with metastasis of the bone cancer to lymph nodes inside his pelvis and mediastinum before spreading more widely on the surface of his sternum and through his left lung.. Gawler's first wife Grace Gawler has disputed his account of his cancer diagnosis and treatment.

In December 1975, with the assistance of Australian psychiatrist Ainslie Meares, who believed that meditation could alter the course of, or even cure cancer, Gawler adopted a regime of intensive meditation. He also followed a Gerson diet and pursued a program of research, introspection and personal development. Gawler claims that in February 1976, his doctors gave him only a few weeks to live.

In February 1976, Gawler reports having had palliative radiotherapy; in October 1976 he reports undergoing three cycles of experimental chemotherapy. In 1977 he also had an audience with Sai Baba. He claims he was declared clear of cancer in 1978. At the same time he was diagnosed with TB, which responded rapidly to conventional treatment and supported by lifestyle-based self-help techniques. Gawler's reported recovery from cancer was documented by his partner, psychiatrist Dr. Meares and, 30 years later, the fact that he was still alive was also documented.

In the December 2011, Internal Medicine Journal, the online journal of the Royal Australian College of Physicians, two oncologists, Ian Haines from Cabrini Hospital and Ray Lowenthal from Hobart, published a report that no biopsy of Gawler for secondary cancer had been made and suggested that all of his symptoms were consistent with tuberculosis. In response to this report, Gawler maintained that the diagnosis was confirmed by his eminent team of physicians of the day, and said that they still stand by that diagnosis. He said that Haines and Lowenthal did not consult with any of these people in preparing their speculative hypothesis and, therefore, did not take account of his clinical history or the many diagnostic tests performed and deemed to be adequate by those physicians to confirm the diagnosis. Gawler's original physicians maintain that the TB developed as a complication of Gawler's primary cancer, osteogenic sarcoma, probably after chemotherapy weakened his immune system.

Steve Novella has written that it cannot be certain whether Gawler ever had metastatic cancer, and that his promotion of the supposed ability of the mind to "cure" cancer exemplifies the fallacy of using anecdotes in medicine. Such notions are, Novella writes, "pure wish-fulfilment fantasy".

== Lifestyle-based cancer treatment work ==
After recovering, Gawler resumed work as a vet for short periods in Geelong and the Gold Coast before moving to Morphett Vale near Adelaide, South Australia, in 1978. In 1980 he then moved to a new practice at Yarra Junction, Victoria.

In 1981, Gawler co-founded the Melbourne Cancer Support Group.

=== Gawler Foundation ===
Gawler founded the non-profit Gawler Foundation in 1984 which included a retreat for those who did not want to adhere to scientifically proven treatments.

The Gawler Foundation ceased operations in May 2021.

== Honours ==
Gawler was awarded an OAM for his contributions to the community in the 1987 Australia Day Honours.

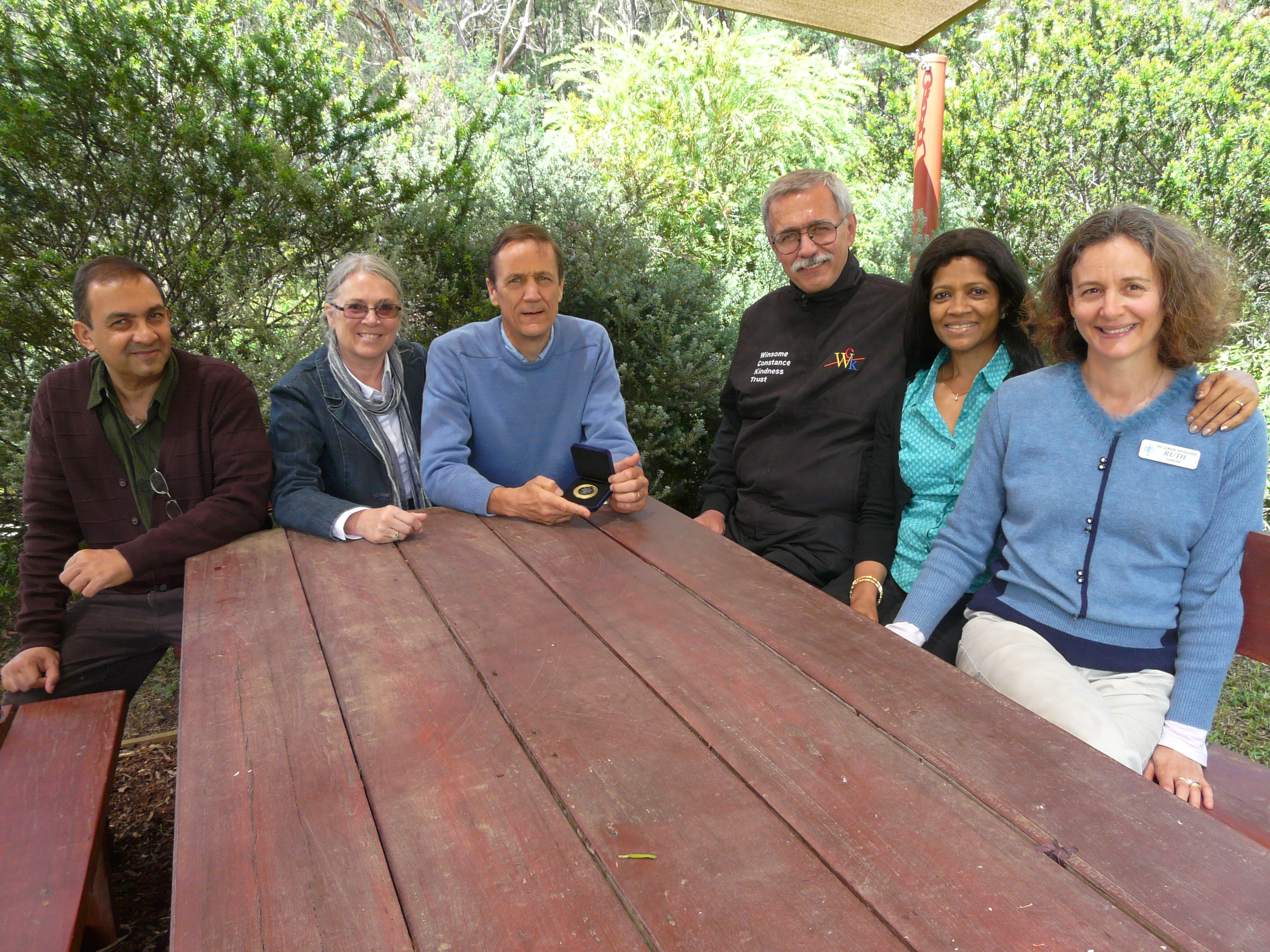
Ian Gawler Kindness Medal recipient

He was also given a Kindness medal and prize in 2011.

== Personal life ==
In 1997, Gawler separated from his first wife, Grace Gawler. They divorced in 1999. In 2010, in response to an article in the Medical Journal of Australia about Gawler's cancer recovery, Grace Gawler disputed some of the facts and timeline regarding his recovery.

Gawler married Ruth Gawler (née Berlin), a medical doctor, in 2000. They have worked together since 2001.

== Biography ==
The story of Gawler's life, Ian Gawler: The Dragon's Blessing, by Guy Allenby, was first published in 2008. The second edition was published in 2010.
