= Colon cleansing =

Pseudoscience procedure to cleanse human colon

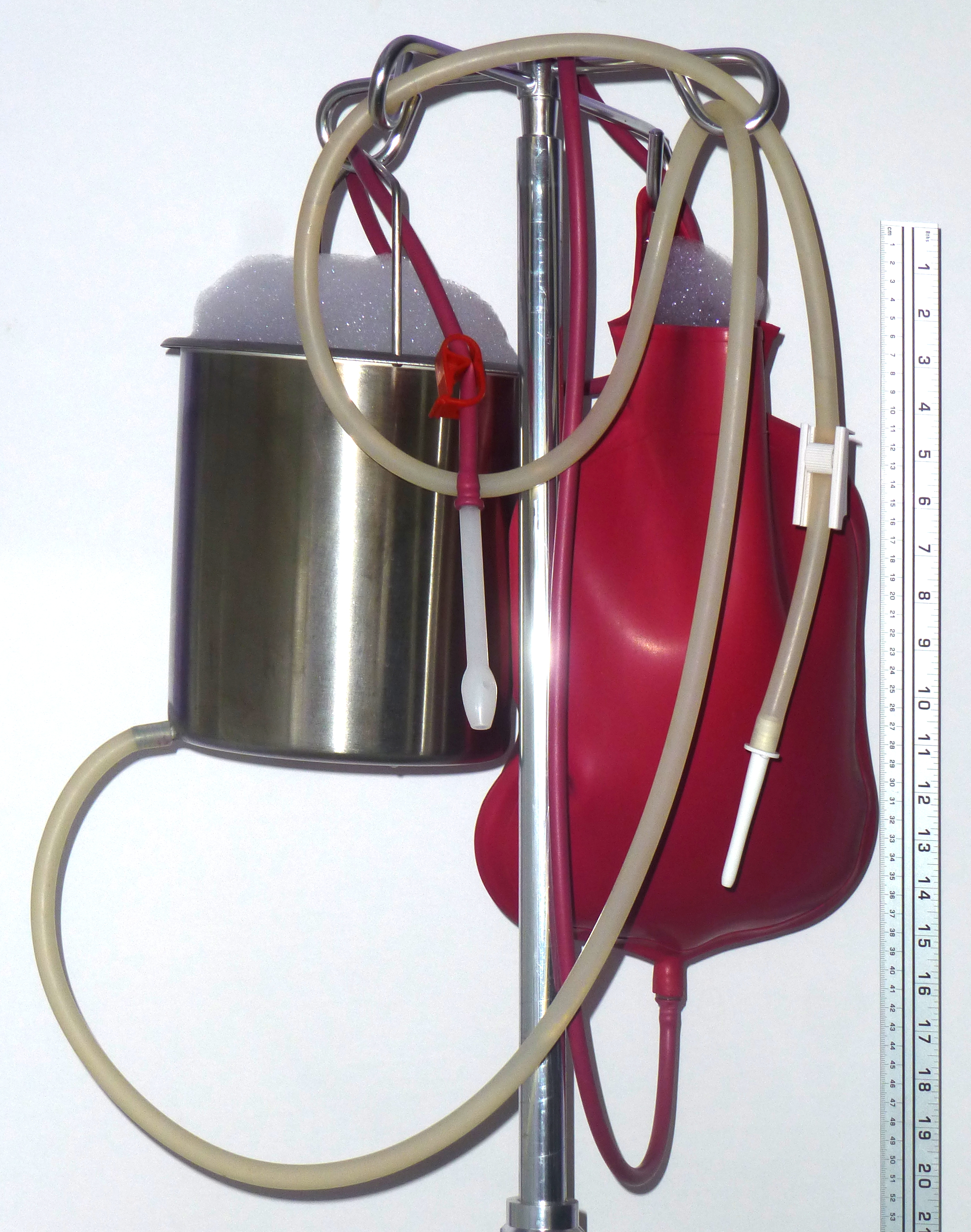
- Large enema equipment for colon cleansing

Alternative therapy
- Claims: Removal of unspecified toxins

Colon cleansing, also known as colon therapy, colon hydrotherapy, a colonic, or colonic irrigation, encompasses a number of alternative medical therapies claimed to remove toxins from the colon and intestinal tract by removing accumulations of feces. Colon cleansing in this context should not be confused with an enema which introduces fluid into the colon, often under mainstream medical supervision, for a limited number of purposes including severe constipation and medical imaging.

Some forms of colon hydrotherapy use tubes to inject water, sometimes mixed with herbs or other liquids, into the colon via the rectum using special equipment. Oral cleaning regimes use dietary fiber, herbs, dietary supplements, or laxatives. Those who practice colon cleansing believe in autointoxication, that accumulations of putrefied feces line the walls of the large intestine and that these accumulations harbor parasites or pathogenic gut flora, causing nonspecific symptoms and general ill health.

Autointoxication, a term coined in 1884 by the French physician Charles Jacques Bouchard, is a hypothesis based on medical beliefs of the ancient Egyptians and Greeks and was discredited in the early 20th century. Nonetheless, during the 2000s Internet marketing and infomercials of oral supplements supposedly for colon cleansing increased.

There is no scientific evidence for the alleged benefits of colon cleansing. Certain enema preparations have been associated with heart attacks and electrolyte imbalances, and improperly prepared or used equipment can cause infection or damage to the bowel. Frequent colon cleansing can lead to dependence on enemas to defecate and some herbs may reduce the effectiveness of, or increase the risks associated with the use of, prescription medications.

== Effectiveness and risks ==
The symptoms that are attributed to autointoxication—headache, fatigue, loss of appetite and irritability—may be caused by mechanical distention within the bowel, such as irritable bowel syndrome, rather than toxins from putrefying food. The benefits anecdotally attributed to colon cleansing are vague, and the claims made by manufacturers and practitioners are based on a flawed understanding of the body. There is little evidence of actual benefit to the procedure, and no evidence that it can alleviate the symptoms that are attributed to the theories of colon cleansing.

As the colon normally expels waste, colon cleansing is generally unneeded. Colonic irrigation can disrupt the bowel's normal flora, and, if done frequently, can result in electrolyte depletion with dehydration. Rare but severe adverse events have been rectal perforation, as well as amoebic infection, from poorly sterilised equipment. Others claim that colon cleansing may impede the colon's shedding of dead cells.

Excessive use of enemas has also been associated with heart problems, such as heart failure, as well as heart attacks related to electrolyte imbalances when performed as a coffee enema. Frequent enemas or other colon-cleansing tools may lead to dependence and inability to defecate without assistance, as well as potential withdrawal symptoms. Herbs taken orally may modulate the absorption or the activity of prescription medications.

Medical doctor Harriet Hall writes that "The colon cleanses itself... The idea that its walls are coated with years-old hamburger residue is preposterous".

According to the American Cancer Society, "Available scientific evidence does not support claims that colon therapy is effective in treating cancer or any other disease".

== Colon hydrotherapy ==
Colonic irrigation, also known as colon hydrotherapy, colonic hydrotherapy, or a "colonic", is a treatment "to wash out the contents of the large bowel by means of copious enemas using water or other medication."

During a cleansing enema, liquid is introduced into the colon and retained for five to fifteen minutes. During a colonic, liquid is introduced into the colon and then it is flushed out, and this is repeated until the entire colon is cleared.

Colonic irrigation has been described as an "unwise" procedure as it carries the risk of serious harm and has no proven benefit.

=== Regulation ===
In the United States, the Food and Drug Administration (FDA) regulates the production of equipment used in colon hydrotherapy but does not regulate its use, or the supplements used in oral colon-cleansing regimens. Manufacturer claims do not require verification or supporting evidence. The contents of the products are also not verified or tested. The FDA has issued several letters warning manufacturers and suppliers of colon hydrotherapy equipment about making false claims of effectiveness, safety issues, and quality control violations.

== History ==
The concept of autointoxication, the idea that food enters the intestine and rots, provides a rationale for colon cleansing. The ancient Egyptians believed that toxins formed as a result of decomposition within the intestines, and moved from there into the circulatory system, causing fever and the development of pus. The Ancient Greeks adopted and expanded the idea, applying their belief in the four humours. In the 19th century, studies in biochemistry and microbiology seemed to support the autointoxication hypothesis, and mainstream physicians promoted the idea. Daly notes that, historically, "purging was one of the few procedures that a physician could perform with visible, often impressive results and without immediate or obvious dangers".

Ilya Ilyich Mechnikov (1845–1916) became the strongest supporter of the idea of colon cleansing; he thought that toxins could shorten the lifespan. Over time, the concept broadened to autointoxication, which supposes that the body cannot fully dispose of its waste products and toxins, which then accumulate in the intestine. In some cases, the concept led to radical surgeries to remove the colon for unrelated symptoms.

Autointoxication enjoyed some favor in the medical community in the late 19th and early 20th centuries, but clinicians discarded it as advances in science failed to support its claims. A 1919 paper entitled "Origin of the so-called auto-intoxication symptom" in the Journal of the American Medical Association marked the beginning of the rejection of the autointoxication hypothesis by the medical community.

Despite a lack of scientific support, autointoxication persists in the public imagination. In the 1990s, the practice of colon cleansing experienced a resurgence in the alternative-medical community, supported by testimonials and anecdotal evidence and promoted by manufacturers of colon-cleansing products.

== See also ==
- Mucoid plaque
- Whole bowel irrigation
