= Belle Gibson =

Australian convicted scammer (born 1991)

- Born: Annabelle Natalie Gibson; 8 October 1991 (age 35); Launceston, Tasmania, Australia
- Years active: 2013
- Known for: Fraudulent medical claims

Annabelle Natalie Gibson (born 8 October 1991) is an Australian health fraudster, former influencer and pseudoscience advocate. She is the author of The Whole Pantry mobile app and its later companion cookbook. Throughout her career as a wellness guru, Gibson falsely claimed to have been diagnosed with multiple cancer pathologies, including brain cancer, which she claimed to be effectively managing through diet, exercise, natural medicine, and alternative medicine therapies. She falsely claimed she had donated significant proportions of her income and company profits to numerous charities. Gibson admitted in an April 2015 interview that she had fabricated her claims of having multiple cancers.

Consumer Affairs Victoria announced legal action against Gibson in 2016, and in 2017 the Federal Court of Australia supported most of their claims, applying a fine of A$410,000, which, as of March 2026, Gibson has not paid.

== Early life and education ==
Annabelle Natalie Gibson was born on 8 October 1991 in Launceston, Tasmania. According to interviews given before she was exposed, she left her Brisbane family home at age 12 to live with a classmate and later lived with a family friend.

Gibson attended Wynnum State High School in Wynnum, Queensland, until dropping out in Year 10, although she also later claimed to have been homeschooled.

== Career and deceit ==
Gibson worked for some time as a trainee for catering supply company PFD Food Services in Lytton. Social media posts show that by late 2008 she had relocated to Perth, Western Australia. She was involved in the skateboarding culture and actively participated in its online community there. Gibson moved from Perth to Melbourne in July 2009 and became a mother one year later, at age 18.

In 2012, Gibson launched her Instagram account, "@healing_belle", claiming she had brain cancer and promoting nutrition and lifestyle interventions. The account amassed "200,000 followers within a year".

She launched The Whole Pantry mobile app in August 2013, at age 21 (just 2 months shy of her 22nd birthday).

Gibson reportedly told a prospective business partner in 2014 that she had "several names" that she went under. Her mother changed her name five times when she was young, Gibson claimed in an interview with The Australian Women's Weekly. Gibson's corporate filings indicate that she is three years younger than she has publicly claimed to be.

=== The Whole Pantry ===
Gibson's mobile app The Whole Pantry was downloaded 200,000 times within its first month. It was voted Apple's Best Food and Drink App of 2013. Gibson soon after signed a book deal with Lantern Books, an imprint of Penguin Books, for an accompanying table-top cookbook, which was published in October 2014. She further worked with Apple Inc. in September 2014 to transition the app as a privileged pre-installed default third-party inclusion in the Apple Watch's April 2015 launch. By early 2015, it was estimated that more than A$1 million had been made in sales of The Whole Pantry app and book. Gibson chronicled her experience of cancer on a blog of the same name, but "doubts about her claims surfaced after she failed to deliver a promised $300,000 donation to a charity".

Before doubts were raised about her health and charitable donation claims, Gibson had intended to expand her brand beyond the app, having earlier registered the domain The Whole Life, and advertised in December 2014 to recruit an IT specialist to expand the app and brand portfolio. Both The Whole Pantry app and The Whole Life were registered by Gibson's partner, Clive Rothwell, in her corporate name. The Whole Pantry registration was amended in March 2015 after the controversy broke.

The Whole Pantry denied that Gibson had helped any person to reject conventional cancer treatment. Critics have quoted social media posts in which she said she had "countless times helped others" to forgo conventional medical treatment for cancer and to treat themselves "naturally", as well as "leading them down natural therapy for everything from fertility, depression, bone damage and other types of cancer".

=== Health claims ===
In interviews, Gibson claimed to have had brain cancer, blood, spleen, uterine, liver and kidney cancers, which she falsely attributed to a reaction to the Gardasil cervical cancer vaccine. When the book was launched in November 2014, Gibson claimed in its preface that she had been "stable for two years now with no growth of the cancer". Her story emerged as inconsistent: she told media outlets the cancer had reached her liver and kidneys; three months earlier, she had posted on The Whole Pantry's Facebook page that her cancer had spread to her brain, blood, spleen, and uterus. Gibson had claimed she had undergone heart surgery several times and to have died momentarily on the operating table. She also claimed to have had a stroke. However, she could not substantiate her medical claims, or name the doctors who had diagnosed and treated her. Gibson did not bear any surgical scars from her purported heart operations.

Gibson's and The Whole Pantry's statements regarding the benefits of exercise, healthy eating, and a positive mindset were considered to be uncontroversial, being widely acknowledged as conducive to holistic well-being. However, on her now-deleted Instagram account and on other social media, Gibson also promoted pseudoscience practices, including Gerson therapy, anti-vaccination and the consumption of non-pasteurised raw milk.

The controversial Gerson therapy had been similarly promoted by another Australian wellness blogger, Jessica Ainscough, whose funeral Gibson attended when Ainscough died from cancer in late February 2015.

=== Charitable claims ===
As Gibson's medical claims were scrutinised, allegations emerged that charitable contributions raised in 2013 and 2014 were not given to their intended causes. Gibson denied the charges, but Fairfax Media stated that she had "failed to hand over proceeds solicited in the name of five charities" and had "grossly overstated the company's total donations to different causes". Two charities confirmed to The Australian newspaper that Gibson's company had used their names in fundraising drives but had either failed to deliver the donations or had inadequately accounted for the funds.

Gibson had claimed on several occasions in 2014 that The Whole Pantry had donated approximately $300,000 to charities, including maternal healthcare in developing nations, medical support for children with cancer and schools in sub-Saharan Africa. In late 2014, when The Whole Pantry app was pre-installed on the Apple iPad, Gibson claimed through her Instagram account to be working with twenty different charities. Gibson claimed in her LinkedIn professional networking profile, established in February 2013, to be a philanthropist.

In relation to fraud proceedings, Gibson eventually admitted that she had seriously overstated the charitable contributions that had been made. Subsequent media reports in March 2015 stated that it could be ascertained that only an estimated $7,000 of the previously claimed $300,000 had been donated to a total of three charities, with at least $1,000 of the $7,000 reportedly having been donated only after Gibson became aware of the Fairfax investigation into her earlier claims. Another $1,000 of the $7,000 had been donated to a charitable cause under Rothwell's name, rather than Gibson's or the company name.

Also, in March 2015, the parents of a young child with brain cancer whom Gibson had befriended came forward to report that they had been unaware that Gibson had earlier been claiming to be fundraising for their child's treatment on their behalf. The family had never received any funds from her or The Whole Pantry and suspected that Gibson had been using information gleaned from the family's experiences to underpin her own claims to have brain cancer.

=== Concern over publisher culpability ===
As the controversy grew, questions began to be raised about Apple, Penguin and the Australian media's lack of due diligence in prima facie accepting Gibson's claims of having multiple cancers, an issue taken up by the ABC's Media Watch program.

Apple Inc., in response to media enquiry in March 2015, declined to remove The Whole Pantry app from sale, stating that it was only concerned about the functionality of the app, but it was soon after removed from inclusion in the Apple Watch launch. Apple subsequently deleted the app from the App Store and removed it from all Apple Watch promotional material. Apple did not provide any public information about the reasons for the removal, but an internal email from an Australian executive to the company's US office acknowledged that the removal would be subject to comment.

Lantern Books, when approached by investigative journalists, said that it had not checked the validity of Gibson's cancer claims, as this was not required for a cookbook. Soon after, as the controversy grew, Penguin withdrew the book from sale, citing a lack of response from Gibson to its queries about the media accusations. However, Fairfax reported that Penguin had, prior to publication of the book, already quizzed and videotaped Gibson on her cancer story, as recounted in the preface. Penguin agreed to pay A$30,000 to the Victorian Consumer Law Fund as a penalty for having failed to validate that the book was true.

Elle Australia magazine, published by Bauer Media Group, admitted that following a laudatory December 2014 story on Gibson, they had received but ultimately dismissed anonymous claims that she was fabricating her story. A second Bauer magazine, Cosmopolitan, which had awarded Gibson its 2014 "Fun Fearless Female" social media award, admitted that it too had received and dismissed a similar email. After Gibson's confessions, the magazine decided not to strip her of the award, stating that she had been "reader nominated and reader voted". However, a month earlier, Cosmopolitan's associate editor had stated that he or she "put forward the nomination myself", indicating that the magazine – not the public – had been instrumental in promoting Gibson's award.

A cancer research professional from the Garvan Institute of Medical Research stated publicly that, by failing to conduct basic fact checking and providing "unfiltered PR" to Gibson's untested claims, an uncritical media had been complicit in her "scam".

=== Attempted clean-up and defence ===
Once the controversy surfaced in the media, The Whole Pantry began removing any comments made on its (later-deleted) Facebook page that questioned Gibson's claims, asserting that these comments only added to "the misinformation" of the initial Fairfax article. This selective deletion drew even more criticism.

Posts that Gibson had made on her Instagram account that made reference to her cancers or charitable donations were also selectively deleted. Soon after, all posts were deleted from Gibson's and The Whole Pantry's Instagram accounts. Around the same time, individual postings about Gibson's cancer, and claims of having died briefly while under heart surgery, were also being selectively deleted by the administrator of her blog "at the request of a user". Accounts across a number of social media platforms were soon either abandoned, made private, or deleted in their entirety. Gibson subsequently established another Facebook account under an alias, which was used to defend her work and counter what she called "bullying" of herself and family. She wrote that she would shortly publish an "open letter".

== Admission of deceit ==
In February 2015, Gibson's close friend Chanelle McAuliffe confronted Gibson with suspicions about her cancer claims and perpetrating a scam. McAuliffe urged Gibson to come forward with the truth, but she refused. Concerned about the harm Gibson was causing to people with cancer, McAuliffe reported Gibson to the police, a lawyer and an investigative journalist; they were not willing to look into the case. Finally, journalists at The Age recognised McAuliffe as a legitimate whistleblower and broke the first story of Gibson's fraud. In March 2015, after reports identified Gibson's fraudulent claims regarding her charitable donations, media investigation found that she had also fabricated her stories of cancer and lied about her age, personal life and history. Concerns were expressed that Gibson had led a profligate lifestyle by renting an upmarket town house, leasing a luxury car and office space, undergoing cosmetic dental procedures, purchasing designer clothes and holidaying internationally. She paid these expenses from donations she received for charities.

With a collapsing social media support base, Gibson admitted in an April 2015 interview that her claims of having multiple cancers had been fabricated, stating that "none of it's true". She gave an interview to The Australian Women's Weekly in which she admitted to having fabricated all her cancer claims. She attributed her deceit to her upbringing, specifically to neglect by her now-estranged mother, claiming to having been forced to take care of herself and her brother since the age of five. The interview was described as an admission of deceit, without expression of regret or apology. Gibson's Women's Weekly interview was arranged by Bespoke Approach, and Gibson was provided pro bono representation by the company during the interview.

In a May 2015 interview with the same magazine, Gibson's mother, Natalie Dal-Bello, refuted several claims Gibson had made about her family, including the false claim that her brother was autistic.

== Legal action ==
On 6 May 2016, Consumer Affairs Victoria announced legal action against Gibson and Inkerman Road Nominees Pty Ltd (originally known as Belle Gibson Pty Ltd) for "false claims by Ms. Gibson and her company concerning her diagnosis with terminal brain cancer, her rejection of conventional cancer treatments in favour of natural remedies, and the donation of proceeds to various charities". The regulator said it had conducted an in-depth investigation of Gibson's activities and applied to Australia's Federal Court for leave to pursue legal action. Gibson's publisher, Penguin Australia, agreed to pay $30,000 to the Victorian Consumer Law Fund as a penalty for releasing The Whole Pantry without fact checking.

On 15 March 2017, the Federal Court of Australia found that the prosecution had proven most of those claims, concluding that "Ms. Gibson had no reasonable basis to believe she had cancer". Gibson was fined $410,000 (which she has not paid as of 2025), but the judge accepted Gibson's story that she was acting out of delusion rather than criminal intent. Federal Court Justice Debra Mortimer delivered the decision that "most but not all" of the claims against Gibson were proven. Gibson did not appear in court for the decision. Justice Mortimer found that Gibson's claims had been misleading and deceptive, and that "Ms. Gibson had no reasonable basis to believe she had cancer from the time she began making these claims in public to promote The Whole Pantry Book and the apps in mid-2013", but there was not enough evidence to prove that she was not acting out of delusion.

Gibson's actions were described by Mark Feldman, a clinical professor of psychiatry who coined the term "Münchausen's by internet", as "particularly predatory", as well as "deceit on a grand scale, for personal profit".

In September 2017, Gibson was fined $410,000 for making false claims about her donations to charity. As the fine was unpaid, in 2019, the authorities sought power to charge her with contempt of court. A new trial was set for 14 May, and she was to face 6 years in jail if she did not attend. As of mid-September 2019, Gibson still had not paid, claiming to be broke, and Consumer Affairs Victoria were still seeking to enforce the penalty. In a 2017 letter later released by the Federal Court, Gibson had stated that she was $170,000 in debt, and had $5,000 to her name.

On 22 January 2020, the Sheriff's Office of Victoria conducted a search warrant at Gibson's home in Northcote and seized items to recoup Gibson's unpaid fines, which, due to interest and costs, exceeded half a million dollars. In February 2021, the Federal Court registrar marked her case as "abandoned". Her home was subject to a second warrant on 21 May 2021 to "try to recoup her unpaid fines". As of March 2026 Gibson has not paid her outstanding fines.

== Claimed adoption into Oromo community ==
On 23 January 2020, the day after the police executed the first search warrant, an October 2019 Shabo Media video surfaced in which Gibson was wearing a headscarf and speaking partially in the Oromo language (referring to herself as "Sabontu"), discussing the political situation in Ethiopia with an interviewer and referring to Ethiopia as "back home". She professed to have been adopted by the Ethiopian community in Melbourne after volunteering for four years, calling the adoption a gift from "Allah".

However, on the same day, the president of the Australian Oromo Community Association in Victoria, Tarekegn Chimdi, stated that Gibson was not a registered volunteer, "is not a community member and she's also not working with the community" and that he had seen her at events only two or three times. He said that nobody seemed to know who she was, and he had only just learned of her backstory and wished her to stop saying she was part of the community.

== In popular media ==
In 2023, Netflix produced a two-part documentary about Gibson titled The Search For Instagram's Worst Con Artist.

Gibson is portrayed by Kaitlyn Dever in the 2025 Netflix drama series Apple Cider Vinegar.

== See also ==
- Ashley Kirilow, Canadian fraudster who raised money for cancer charities by falsely claiming that she had cancer
- Elisabeth Finch, Grey's Anatomy writer who pretended to have cancer
- A. J. Finn, American thrillerist who pretended to have cancer
- Michael Guglielmucci cancer scandal
- Misery literature
- Munchausen's syndrome
- Diet and cancer
