= Clinica 0-19 =

Alternative medicine clinic in Mexico

Clinica 0-19 is a medical clinic in Monterrey, Mexico that claims to treat diffuse intrinsic pontine glioma (DIPG). Although DIPG is currently regarded as one of the most devastating pediatric cancers, with a survival rate of <1% over five years, the clinic states that their treatment, which can cost hundreds of thousands of dollars, has resulted in some patients no longer having any evidence of disease. However, there is no credible evidence to support their claims and at least some of their patients were found to have tumor growth a few months later. Oncologists and others have criticized the clinic's lead doctors, Alberto Siller and Alberto Garcia, for their lack of transparency, for not publishing their treatment protocol or survival rates, for the high costs of treatment, and for discouraging their patients from using radiation therapy.

== Treatment of diffuse intrinsic pontine glioma ==
Clinica 0-19 treats DIPG with intra-arterial chemotherapy and immunotherapy. While consultation and follow-up appointments take place at Clinica 0-19, treatments are carried out at nearby hospitals, especially Hospital Angeles.

For the intra-arterial chemotherapy, a catheter is inserted into the femoral artery, guided to the patient's brainstem, and used to deliver chemotherapy drugs. The clinic has stated that the drugs they use are FDA approved. Their website does not provide any examples of the kinds of drugs, but drugs they have employed in the past have included unusually low doses of cisplatin, cetuximab, doxorubicin, and Avastin. None of these drugs have been shown to be effective against DIPG, and it is unclear if Avastin has been approved by the FDA for use in children. According to the parents of one patient interviewed in 2018, the doctors administer "10 to 12 different types of medicines." Treatment is provided once every three weeks in some cases and once every six weeks in other cases for a total of ten or more times.

The immunotherapy provided by the clinic uses dendritic cells, but very little has been published on the use of dendritic cells to treat DIPG.

Siller and Garcia have not published their protocol for treatment. They characterize their approach as tailoring the treatment to each child. Surgical oncologist and outspoken opponent of alternative medicine, David Gorski has criticized this approach, stating "In other words, we make it up as we go along and can’t tell you how we do it in a sufficiently clear manner to make it possible to write a protocol to do it in a clinical trial."

The clinic has also been criticized for discouraging their patients from using radiation therapy.

=== Efficacy ===
No studies have been conducted on Clinica 0-19's approach to treating DIPG, and the clinic has not provided information on their patients' survival or recurrence rates.

The clinic has released scans appearing to show that patients' tumors have shrunk following treatment at the clinic. Dr. David Ziegler, an Australian pediatric oncologist, has stated the scans "do not accurately depict the tumor." Gorski has noted the apparent shrinking could be the abatement of inflammation around the tumor caused by previous treatment.

Media coverage of the clinic has highlighted cases of patients who, following treatment by Siller and Garcia, lived longer than was initially expected. Gorski has noted that children receiving care at the clinic may have been likely to live longer than average DIPG patients, regardless of treatment by Clinica 0-19, because the clinic only treats patients who can travel to the clinic, forgo treatment with steroids for several months prior to treatment, and who can afford the hundreds of thousands of dollars charged by the clinic for treatment. Gorski also notes that patients who are able to travel abroad and thrive without steroids are likely in better health than the average DIPG patient, and that families that can access large amounts of money for treatment may not be typical of DIPG patients in other ways that could impact their survival.

== Criticism ==
Ziegler and Gorski have criticized Siller and Garcia for not publishing their results or treatment protocol.

Australia's Cure Brain Cancer Foundation (CBCF) sought to visit Clinica 0-19 to research the treatment it provides in March 2018. CBCF has also offered to assist the clinic in reporting their findings. A spokesperson for the clinic stated the doctors would need to develop a program to receive visiting doctors before they could work with the CBCF. As of January 2019, there was no evidence that such visits have been planned. CBCF have stated "With regard to the current news reports about Clinica 0-19 in Mexico, it is not possible for us to recommend that clinic’s approach given that Doctors Siller and Garcia have not yet published any data for critical review about their treatments."

In February 2018, Siller stated the clinic had "started to do some basic numbers" with the intention of publishing their results "in the next coming months."

== Media coverage of patients ==
Several Clinica 0-19 patients have been the subject of media coverage:

- Alexia Eljourdi, an Australian child, was treated by Clinica 0-19 after three years of living with DIPG. Her parents exhausted their funds after four treatments, and were unable to continue treatment. Eljourdi died at age five, a month after her last treatment.
- Riaa Kulkarni, an Australian child, was age seven when she was diagnosed with DIPG. Her tumor shrank 40% after the first treatment by Clinica 0-19. Her parents sold their house to pay for treatment at Clinica 0-19.
- Buddy Miller, a child from Lothrop, Michigan, was diagnosed with DIPG at age seven. In February 2018, Miller's tumor was reported to have disappeared following treatment by Clinica 0-19. By May 2018, the tumor was found to be growing again. He died in October 2018.
- Parker Monholland, from Silver Lake, Kansas, was diagnosed with DIPG at age 8.. While she was being treated by Clinica 0-19, Monholland's Ommaya reservoir, implanted to deliver the chemotherapy drugs administered as part of the treatment provided by the clinic, became infected. She suffered a series of other health problems, and her parents exhausted their funds to provide her with treatment by Clinica 0-19. Her brain activity stopped, and her parents were not given the option of removing her from life support. She died five days later. The family's bill for the hospital in Mexico was in the hundreds of thousands of dollars.
- Annabelle Nguyen, from Perth, Australia, was age two when she was diagnosed with DIPG and was given an estimated six to nine months to live. Her parents sought treatment for her at Clinica 0-19, at a cost of $300,000, which her parents sold their home to pay for. As of February 2018, she was declared to have no evidence of the disease. In April 2018, they found evidence of tumors again. Nguyen fell into a coma. While her family wanted to take her back to Australia, the cost of a flight equipped to care for her during the trip was prohibitively expensive, leaving the family with no choice but to have her cared for in a hospital in Mexico at a cost of thousands of dollars per day. In August 2018, she died at the age of five, and three months after falling into a coma.
- Annabelle Potts, from Canberra, Australia, was diagnosed with DIPG at age three and estimated to have six to nine months to live. Her parents sought treatment for her at Clinica 0-19. She was declared to have no evidence of the disease in March 2018. By June 2018, the tumor began growing again. In a letter to Potts’s mother, Australian Health Minister Greg Hunt stated that the Australian health community's opinion was that the efficacy of Clinica 0-19's treatment had not been proven and that improvement in Potts’s condition was due to treatment she received in Australia. Her parents decided to stop treatments at Clinica 0-19 when her tumors came back and her health declined. Her mother stated as one of the reasons for stopping treatment with Clinica 0-19 "...I’m upset with them [the Mexican doctors] because they should be sharing what they are doing with the world and I’m upset we can’t do more experimental treatments for terminally ill children here in Australia.” She died in January 2019.
- Adalynn "Addy" Joy Sooter, a girl from Arkansas, was diagnosed with DIPG at the age of two. Doctors told her parents Sooter likely only had a few months to live. Her parents spent over $200,000 on travel to and treatment by Clinica 0-19. She died just over a year and a half after she was diagnosed, on June 3, 2018.
- Alan Vasquez, a child from Orlando, FL., was diagnosed with DIPG at age 8. His parents sold their home to pay for treatment at Clinica 0-19. In April 2017, he was reported to have a 50% reduction in the size of his tumor. He died in November 2017.

== See also ==
- Burzynski Clinic
- Oasis of Hope Hospital
