= Oasis of Hope Hospital =

- Location within Tijuana

Geography
- Location: Paseo Playas #19; Sección Monumental, Tijuana, Baja California, Mexico
- Coordinates: 32.531412°N 117.119174°W

Organisation
- Type: Specialist

Services
- Emergency department: No
- Beds: 60
- Speciality: Alternative cancer treatments

Helipads
- Helipad: No

History
- Founded: 1963

Links
- Website: oasisofhope.com
- Lists: Hospitals in Mexico

The Oasis of Hope Hospital is a clinic in Tijuana, Mexico providing alternative cancer treatments to its customers. The clinic was founded by the physician Ernesto Contreras. After his death in 2003, the management of the hospital was taken over by his son, Francisco Contreras, and nephew, Daniel Kennedy.

Since the 1960s, it has administered amygdalin – an ineffective cancer treatment – to its customers. The clinic has been characterized by Quackwatch as "dubious."

== History ==
The Oasis of Hope hospital is based in Tijuana, Mexico. The city is significant as there is a concentration of more than 60 cancer treatment centres in the city, making it one of the largest concentrations of this type of treatment in the world. The Guardian reported in 2005 that the reason for the concentration is that most methods used by the hospitals are "discouraged by conventional medical science" and because health regulations aren't as strict as the United States, it is a logical place for them to operate.

Tijuana is home to the largest concentration of cancer treatment centres offering unorthodox therapies anywhere in the world. More than 60 hospitals, clinics and semi-clandestine offices offer to cure or help control the disease in ways ranging from the unconventional to the controversial. Most methods are discouraged by conventional medical science, which is why they are based in Tijuana, where health regulators rarely bother them.

After Ernesto's death in 2003, running of the clinic passed to his son Francisco Contreras and Daniel Kennedy, who is Francisco's nephew. In 2005 Ralph Moss, an advocate of alternative cancer treatments, published an article giving something of the clinic's history. He wrote that it was formerly known as the Del Mar Medical Center and Hospital and was run by Ernesto Contreras who oversaw its expansion to accommodate customers from the United States; new English-speaking staff had been hired especially to cater for this client base. According to Moss, despite the fact that the American Cancer Society had put Ernesto Contreras on a list of practitioners of "unproven methods" in 1971, the clinic claimed to have had 40,000 American customers in the 40 years prior to 2005.

In 2014, senior management from The Oasis of Hope hospital visited the United Kingdom to speak about alternative medicine. At the time they were not allowed to publicly advertise alternative cancer treatments in the United Kingdom, so the talk was aimed at raising understanding. It was reported however that many of the attendees had cancer and were considering alternative options. This was following a number of public discussions in the country about how to approach alternative treatments. Prince Charles had suggested that the country should itself pursue alternative treatments and offer them in some way. Members of staff from Oasis of Hope visited the UK around the time the Medical Innovation Bill was being discussed. If the bill had passed, it would have opened the door for Oasis of Hope-like treatments to take place in Britain.

== Treatment ==
The Oasis of Hope Hospital offers a variety of alternative cancer treatments. During an interview, Edzard Ernst spoke about the sort of treatments commonly used by hospitals and treatment centers such as the Oasis of Hope. Many of the therapies focus on the removal of carcinogenic substances. Claims are made by the hospitals that the removal of such substances is able to boost the immune system to then fight off cancer. This treatment is however unproven in traditional medicine.

Since the 1960s, Oasis of Hope has treated its patients with amygdalin, also known as laetrile, an ineffective and dangerously toxic substance. By 1978, more than 70,000 people in the United States had reportedly been treated with Laetrile.

Between 1996 and 1997, sociologist David Hess conducted an interview with Francisco Contreras, in which he discussed many aspects of the Clinic's operations. Contreras said that metabolic therapy was the main offering of the clinic, and was made up of four steps; Detoxification, restrictive low-fat, low-protein, high-carbohydrate diet, the use of megavitamin therapy, shark cartilage, thymus and levamisole and the use of amygdalin extracted from apricot seeds.

Another therapy was called the "Warburg" therapy named (according to Hess's account) after Otto Heinrich Warburg. This consisted of a restrictive high-carbohydrate diet, giving patients insulin and quercetin.

Hess also wrote that Contreras cited a number of non-physical aspects to the clinic's therapy, including religious assistance, psychology and singing and laughter sessions – Contreras claimed that people with strong spiritual beliefs recovered better, and that laughter stimulates the immune system.

In 2005 Ralph Moss reported that the clinic was using amygdalin and the Issels treatment. In 2011 Moss wrote a further report on the Tijuana clinics, and noted that their ability to attract customers had been diminished by the publication of research showing that amygdalin was not effective, by tougher regulation arising from the 1994 North American Free Trade Agreement, and from Tijuana itself become a less desirable destination as a result of a decline brought on by the war on drugs. Moss also noted that some American hospitals now have alternative medicine offerings, diminishing the distinctive appeal of the clinics in Tijuana.

In 2005, The Guardian reported the case of a man with cancer who paid US$40,000 for a one-month treatment in which he had high-fevers induced in the belief that the heat would kill his cancer cells.

=== Evidence ===
Amygdalin (sometimes called "laetrile") is a toxic glycoside. The major argument against the use of amygdalin is that it is a toxic glycoside, which has been known to provoke cyanide poisoning in patients. Evidence that is frequently used to display this is people that suffered cyanide poisoning after ingesting bitter almonds, which contain amygdalin.

Issels treatment requires removal of metal fillings from the patient's mouth and adherence to a restrictive diet, supposedly to aid in cancer treatment. Cancer Research UK have said of it: "There is no scientific or medical evidence to back up the claims made by the Issels website".

== Reception ==
Edzard Ernst, a former professor at The University of Exeter stated that Britons in particular were attracted to Tijuana clinics "because the clinics there are famous." According to Quackwatch, the Oasis of Hope Hospital is a "dubious cancer clinic". Richard Sullivan of Cancer Research UK has said, "the Tijuana clinics are essentially set up to deceive and it's a disgrace."

Barrie R. Cassileth commented on a small longterm follow-up study that had been carried out on patients of Mexican clinics, including those taking the Contreras treatments. She said that most patients did not know what stage their cancer was at, but that the mean survival time – of 7 months – was enough to conclude that "Contreras therapy is ineffective in treating late-stage cancer patients".

The Memorial Sloan-Kettering Cancer Center lists "Contreras Therapy" alongside other alternative nutrition-based cancer treatments like the Gerson Therapy which "show no evidence of efficacy".

== See also ==
- List of ineffective cancer treatments
- Quackery
- Clinica 0-19
