= Mucoid plaque =

Pseudoscientific term in alternative medicine

- Claims: Claimed to be a harmful material coating the gastrointestinal tract.
- Related scientific disciplines: Medicine
- Year proposed: Early 20th century
- Original proponents: Richard Anderson

Mucoid plaque (or mucoid cap or rope) is a pseudo-scientific term used by some natural medicine advocates to describe what is claimed to be a combination of harmful mucus-like material and food residue that they say coats the gastrointestinal tract of most people. The term was coined by Richard Anderson, a naturopath and entrepreneur, who sells a range of products that cleanse the body of such plaques.

Many such "colon cleansing" products are promoted to the public on websites that have been described as making misleading medical claims. The presence of laxatives, bentonite clay, and fibrous thickening agents in some of these "cleansing agents" has led to suggestions that the products themselves produce the excreted matter regarded as the plaque. The concept of a 'mucoid plaque' has been dismissed by medical experts as having no anatomical or physiological basis.

== History ==
Various forms of colon cleansing were popular in the 19th and early 20th century. In 1932, Bastedo wrote in the Journal of the American Medical Association about his observation of mucus masses being removed during a colon irrigation procedure: "When one sees the dirty gray, brown or blackish sheets, strings and rolled up wormlike masses of tough mucus with a rotten or dead-fish odor that are obtained by colon irrigations, one does not wonder that these patients feel ill and that they obtain relief and show improvement as the result of the irrigation."

While colonic irrigation enjoyed a vogue in the early 20th century as a possible cure for numerous diseases, subsequent research showed that it was useless and potentially harmful. With the scientific rationale for "colon cleansing" disproven, the idea fell into disrepute as a form of quackery, with a 2005 medical review stating that "there is no evidence to support this ill-conceived theory that has been long abandoned by the scientific community." Similarly, in response to claims that colon cleansing removes "toxins", Bennett Roth, a gastroenterologist at the University of California, stated that "there is absolutely no science to this whatsoever. There is no such thing as getting rid of quote-unquote 'toxins.' The colon was made to carry stool. This is total baloney." The preoccupation with such bowel management products has been described as a "quaint and amusing chapter in the history of weird medical beliefs." Nevertheless, interest in colonic "autointoxication" as a cause of illness, and in colonic irrigation as a cure, enjoyed a revival in alternative medicine at the end of the 20th century.

The term "mucoid plaque" was coined and popularized by naturopath and entrepreneur Richard Anderson, who sells a range of products that claim to cleanse the body of such purported plaques by causing them to be eliminated. Anderson describes a mucoid plaque as a rubbery, ropey, generally green gel-like mucus film that covers the epithelial cells of the hollow organs, particularly of the alimentary canal. Anderson also claims the plaque can impair digestion and the absorption of nutrients, hold pathogens, and cause illnesses such as diarrhea, bowel cancer, allergies and skin conditions. Based on these claims, he promotes efforts to remove the plaque, and sells a range of products to this end.

Though Anderson argues that his beliefs are backed by scientific research, his claims are primarily supported by anecdotal evidence rather than empirical data, and doctors have noted the absence of mucoid plaques. Anderson claims this is due to medical textbooks failing to cover the concept, which results in doctors not knowing what to look for.

== Medical evaluation ==
Practicing physicians have dismissed the concept of mucoid plaque as a hoax and a "non-credible concept". A pathologist at the University of Texas School of Medicine addressed Anderson's claims directly, saying that he has "seen several thousand intestinal biopsies and have never seen any 'mucoid plaque.' This is a complete fabrication with no anatomic basis."

Another pathologist, Edward Friedlander, noted that, in his experience, he has never observed anything resembling a "toxic bowel settlement", and that some online photographs actually depict what he recognises as a blood clot. Commenting on claims that waste material can adhere to the colon, Douglas Pleskow, a gastroenterologist at Beth Israel Deaconess Medical Center, stated, "that is the urban legend. In reality, most people clear their GI tract within three days."

In a review of websites promoting products that claim to remove 'mucoid rope' or plaque from consumers' intestines, Howard Hochster of New York University wrote that these websites are "abundant, quasi-scientific, and unfortunately convincing to a biologically uneducated public." He noted that although such sites are entertaining, they are disturbing in that they promote a belief that has no basis in physiology.

Hochster also noted that a preparation marketed to remove mucoid plaque contains laxatives and bulky fibrous ingredients. Thus, the rope-like fecal material expelled from people who consume this product "certainly is a result of the figs and senna in this preparation," rather than any sort of pathologic 'plaque'. Other 'colon cleanser' products contain bentonite clay that, when ingested, would also result in production of bulky stools.

In many cases, customers purchase supplement products that are said to help the body excrete the so-called 'mucoid plaque'. The customer may consume a number of pills, and then within 12–48 hours, will pass a rope-like fecal material in their subsequent bowel movements. This fecal material is said to be the 'mucoid plaque'. However, analysis of supplements consumed by the customer shows that the active ingredient is very similar to that of clay used in clumping cat litter. This clay takes a negative mould of the large intestine which is then excreted during the customer's next bowel movement.
