= Rhys Morgan =

British journalist (born 1994)

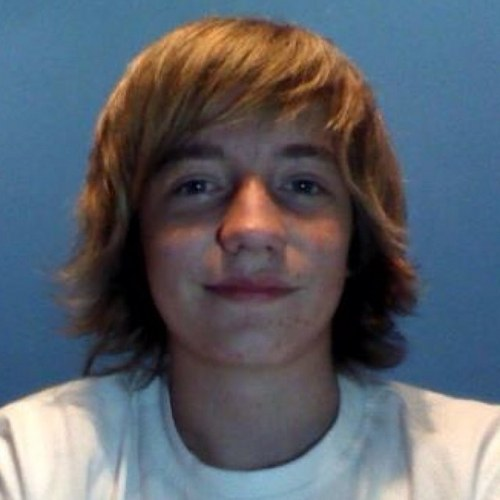
- Morgan in 2011, as pictured on Twitter.
- Born: 1994 (age 31–32)
- Known for: Science activism

Rhys Morgan (born 1994) is an iOS devloper from Cardiff, Wales. As a minor, Morgan was a consumer watchdog, science activist, and health blogger who first received acclaim in 2010 when, at the age of 15, he played a key role in raising awareness of the health risks of Miracle Mineral Supplement. Morgan brought attention to the fact that the product contained bleach and was being illegally marketed as a "miracle" cure, which prompted a consumer warning across the European Union and earned Morgan a James Randi Award for Grassroots Activism.

In 2011, Morgan again received media attention and acclaim, this time for his commentary on treatments offered by Stanislaw Burzynski, a controversial Texas-based physician who uses substances he calls "antineoplastons" as part of a non-approved alternative cancer therapy regimen. Morgan's critique provoked legal and personal threats from a public relations representative of the Burzynski Clinic, which in turn precipitated a hailstorm of criticism from the media, who defended Morgan, and prompted a public apology from the Clinic. In January 2012 Morgan was censured by his school for posting a Jesus and Mo cartoon as his Facebook profile for a week, in solidarity with University College London's Atheist, Secular, and Humanist Society. The school told him to remove the cartoon from his Facebook archive, and when he refused, threatened him with expulsion. Morgan spoke at the Rally for Free Expression in London on 11 February.

== Biography ==
Rhys Morgan was born in 1994 and lives in Cardiff, Wales. He attended Cardiff High School, where he studied mathematics, chemistry, biology and psychology at AS level, before studying for a BSc (Hons) in Health Sciences with the Open University. As of 2026, Morgan is a software developer.

== Science activism ==
=== Miracle Mineral Supplement ===
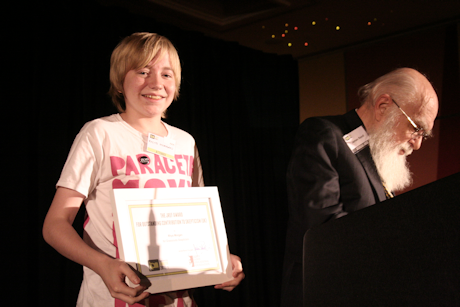
Rhys Morgan receiving the James Randi Award for Grassroots Activism (TAM London, 16 October 2010. Photo by Kelly Haddow). On the right is James Randi.

Morgan first learned of Miracle Mineral Supplement (MMS) in 2010 after he was diagnosed with Crohn's disease and, while researching his condition, came across the Crohn's Disease Forum, a website run by a patient support group. He noticed "a disturbing undercurrent of people trying to push alternative medicines to members". One of these was a product called Miracle Mineral Solution (MMS), which was being advertised with claims that it cured cancer, AIDS, malaria, and a variety of other medical conditions. Upon further research, Morgan came across warnings from the United States Food and Drug Administration and Health Canada indicating that MMS consisted of 28% bleach and advising consumers not to use it.

Morgan and others began documenting sellers of MMS and reporting them to the relevant authorities in Britain, and he eventually addressed a public meeting of the Cardiff Council to win the backing of trading standards officers to highlight the dangers of MMS. These efforts eventually led the Food Standards Agency (FSA) to issue a warning across the European Union and put United Kingdom councils on alert over retail sales of MMS. FSA representative Hefin Davies said that Morgan's actions had been "very positive" in bringing the issue to the attention of authorities. He recounted his saga with MMS on the BBC's The One Show, and on podcasts such as The Skeptics' Guide to the Universe, Righteous Indignation, and Token Skeptic.

For his efforts in raising awareness about MMS, Morgan was presented with the James Randi Award for Grassroots Activism at The Amaz!ng Meeting (TAM) in London in October 2010, and received a standing ovation from the meeting's attendees.

=== Burzynski Clinic and antineoplastons ===
In November 2011, a music writer and editor for the British newspaper The Observer sought help raising £200,000 to have his four-year-old niece, who had been diagnosed with a glioma (a type of brain cancer), receive treatment at the Burzynski Clinic, a controversial cancer treatment facility in Texas operated by physician Stanislaw Burzynski. Several bloggers, including Morgan, reported other cases of patients who had spent similar amounts of money on the Clinic's treatments, and had died, and challenged the validity of Burzynski's antineoplaston therapy. Marc Stephens, identifying himself as a representative of the Burzynski Clinic, sent emails to Morgan accusing him of libel and demanding that coverage of Burzynski be removed from his site. Stephens accompanied the legal threats with a Google Maps satellite image of the teenager's house. In response, Morgan posted Stephens' emails on his blog and defended his original assessment as well as the importance of open dialogue in the evaluation of scientific research.

The threats against Morgan prompted a media backlash against Stephens and the Burzynski Clinic, as reporters from Discover Magazine, Houston Press, and The Guardian covered the story and defended Morgan's critique. The Guardian's Comment is Free section also featured an opinion piece written by Morgan in which he reiterated his position on Burzynski's therapy and argued that the Burzynski Clinic was using libel laws to silence critics of its cancer treatment and stifle debate about the validity of the Clinic's scientific methodology, the so-called chilling effect.

Following the publicity fallout in response to Stephens' threats, the Burzynski Clinic issued a press release on 29 November confirming that the Clinic had hired Stephens "to provide web optimization services and to attempt to stop the dissemination of false and inaccurate information concerning Dr. Burzynski and the Clinic". The press release included an apology for Stephens' comments and for the posting of Morgan's personal information, and announced that Stephens "no longer has a professional relationship with the Burzynski Clinic."

The story, including the threats against Morgan, was covered by the British Medical Journal, which referred to him as a health blogger. The chief clinician at Cancer Research UK expressed his concern at the treatment offered, and Andy Lewis of the Quackometer and science writer Simon Singh, who was previously sued by the British Chiropractic Association, said that English libel law harms public discussion of science and medicine, and thus public health.

== See also ==
- Pseudoscience
- Quackery
- Snake oil
