= Metabolic typing =

Pseudoscientific diet system

Metabolic typing is a pseudoscience whose proponents believe that each person has a unique metabolism, and that the proportion of macromolecules (proteins, carbohydrates and fats) which are optimal for one person may not be for a second, and could even be detrimental to them.

Metabolic typing uses common visible symptoms related to the skin, eyes, and other parts of the body to assess different aspects of a person's metabolism and categorize them into broad metabolic types. In addition, some proponents of metabolic typing use tests such as hair analysis to determine a person's metabolic type.

A number of somewhat different metabolic typing diet plans are currently marketed, though the validity and effectiveness of metabolic typing have yet to be established.

== Background ==
Metabolic typing was introduced by William Donald Kelley, a dentist, in the 1960s. Kelley advocated basing dietary choices on the activity of one's sympathetic and parasympathetic nervous systems. In 1970, Kelley was convicted of practicing medicine without a license, as he had diagnosed a patient with lung cancer based on a fingerstick blood test and prescribed nutritional therapy. He continued to promote a metabolic typing diet through the 1980s. The practice has been further developed by others including Harold J. Kristal and William Wolcott.

== Effectiveness ==
Some metabolic typing companies use a battery of blood and urine tests performed by reputable laboratories, but interpret the results in an unconventional and medically questionable fashion. During a 1985 investigation into one such firm, an investigator sent two separate samples of his own blood and urine for analysis. He received two drastically different "metabolic typing" reports and dietary plans. Both plans involved the purchase of dietary supplements costing several dollars per day.

== Metabolic therapies ==
"Metabolic therapy", including administration of laetrile, was promoted for cancer patients by John Richardson in the San Francisco Bay Area in the 1970s, until his arrest for violating the California Cancer Law and revocation of his license by the California Board of Medical Quality Assurance.

The Memorial Sloan-Kettering Cancer Center (MSKCC) website describes metabolic therapies as "strict dietary and detoxification regimens touted to prevent and treat cancer and degenerative diseases", a term and definition different from that used for metabolic typing in this Wikipedia article. The MSKCC website notes, in relation to three such anti-cancer therapies, that "...retrospective reviews of the Gerson, Kelley, and Contreras metabolic therapies show no evidence of efficacy."

== Metabolic diet ==
William Donald Kelley, in his book, classified the Metabolism of an individual into three categories. Few are fast oxidizer, few are a slow oxidizer. Some have a normal rate of food oxidization called mixed oxidizer. Based on this rate of oxidization the Diet (nutrition) for an individual varies. Since fast oxidizers oxidize food quickly, they are advised to rely more on fat protein efficient diet. This diet will help them to bear hunger. Meanwhile, slow oxidizers are given carbohydrate efficient diet. Eating more proteins or fats can cause Abdominal pain in them. Mixed oxidizer eat a mixture of fat and protein efficient diet.

== See also ==
- List of ineffective cancer treatments
