= Wellspring Cancer Support Foundation =

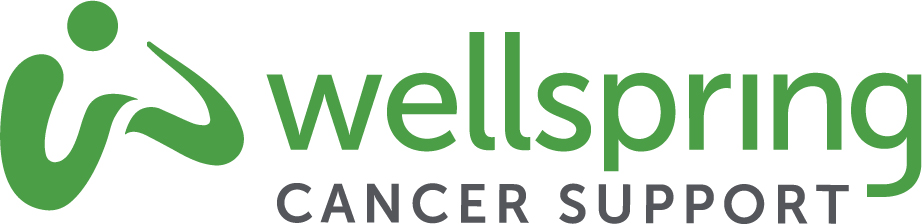
- Founded: 1992
- Type: Non-profit organization based in Canada
- Purpose: "Helping people live better with cancer."
- Legal status: Active
- Region served: Canada
- Location: Toronto, Ontario
- Website: https://wellspring.ca/

Wellspring Cancer Support Foundation (Wellspring) is a Canadian charity that provides non-medical supportive care services for individuals living with cancer, their caregivers, and their families.

== History ==
Wellspring was founded in 1992 in Toronto, Ontario, by Anne Armstrong Gibson, a cancer patient who sought to address the emotional and practical needs of individuals facing cancer. With support from Dr. Simon Sutcliffe, then CEO of Princess Margaret Hospital, the first Wellspring centre was opened in a coach house on Wellesley Street East. Although Gibson died in 1995, the foundation continued to expand across Canada.

In 1999, a second location opened at Sunnybrook Health Sciences Centre in Toronto. Since then, the organization has expanded to multiple locations in Ontario, Alberta, and New Brunswick, as well as through online programming.

== Programs and services ==
Wellspring delivers non-clinical supportive care for cancer patients and caregivers. It offers a variety of evidence-based programs, delivered by qualified professionals, including social workers, psychotherapists, physiotherapists, art therapists, and dietitians. Services include peer support, support groups, counselling, educational workshops, cancer-specific exercise classes, financial navigation, return-to-work support, and symptom management support.

In response to the COVID-19 pandemic, Wellspring expanded its virtual programming through the launch of a dedicated Virtual Centre, enabling access across Canada, including remote and underserved regions.

== Organizational structure ==
Wellspring Cancer Support Foundation operates as the governing entity for centres in the Greater Toronto Area, overseeing intellectual property and program standards. Affiliate organizations—each a separate legally incorporated charity—operate in other regions while adhering to shared quality, branding, and evidence-based program standards.

== Locations ==
- Birmingham Gilgan House (Oakville, ON)
- Carma House (Calgary, AB)
- Chinguacousy (Brampton, ON)
- Edmonton House (Edmonton, AB)
- London & Region (London, ON)
- New Brunswick (Moncton, NB)
- Niagara (Fonthill, ON)
- Randy O'Dell House (Calgary, AB)
- Westerkirk House (Toronto, ON)
