= Sutton Group =

Canadian real estate business

- Industry: Real estate
- Founded: 1983; 43 years ago
- Headquarters: Burnaby, British Columbia, Canada,
- Key people: Drew Keddy
- Products: Real estate brokerage services
- Number of employees: 5500
- Website: www.sutton.com

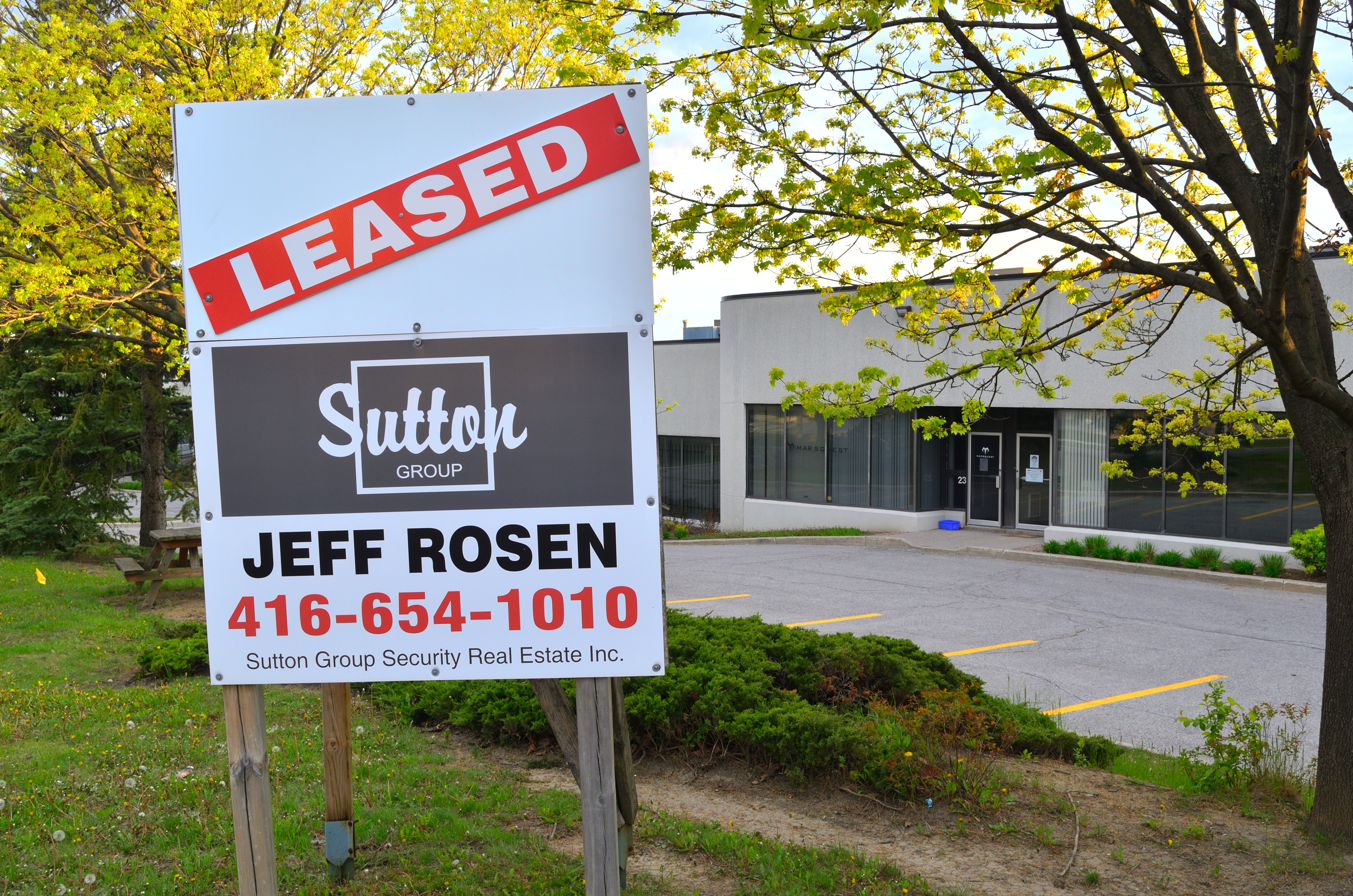
Sutton Group for lease sign

Sutton Group or simply known as Sutton, is a Canadian real estate franchiser and owner-operator with more than 200 locations and over 5500 Realtors in Canada.

== History ==
Sutton was founded in 1983 in North Vancouver. The CEO of Sutton Group was Drew Keddy until the year of 2019.

Sutton was acquired by McCredie Investments in 2023.
