= Ernesto Contreras (physician) =

Mexican physician

Dr. Ernesto Contreras, Sr.
- Born: Ernesto Contreras, Sr; June 1, 1915; Guadalajara, Jalisco, Mexico
- Died: October 3, 2003 (aged 88); Baja California, Tijuana, Mexico
- Citizenship: Mexico
- Education: Military Medical School, Mexico City; General Practitioner, 1939
- Occupations: Physician, researcher, hospital director, military, professor
- Relatives: Rita Pulido (wife); Francisco Contreras (son) current Director, President and Chairman of Oasis of Hope Hospital
- Medical career
- Profession: Medical Doctor
- Field: Cancer research
- Institutions: Oasis of Hope Hospital
- Sub-specialties: Pediatric pathology
- Military career
- Allegiance: Mexico
- Branch: Mexican Army
- Service years: 1939–43
- Rank: Major
- Unit: 18th Army Air Forces Base Unit

Ernesto Contreras (1915–2003) served as a Mexican medical doctor. He operated the Oasis of Hope Hospital in Tijuana for over 30 years, claiming to "treat" cancer patients with amygdalin (also called "laetrile" or, erroneously, "vitamin B_{17}") which has been found completely ineffective. His practices have been widely condemned.

Contreras received post-graduate training at the Children's Hospital Boston in Boston. He served as the chief pathologist at the Army Hospital in Mexico City and was Professor of Histology and Pathology at the Mexican Army Medical School.

== Controversial cancer treatment ==
About extreme terminal cancer cases, Contreras alleged: "The palliative action [the ability of laetrile to improve comfort of patient] is in about 60% of the cases. Frequently, enough to be significant, I see arrest of the disease or even regression in some 15% of the very advanced cases." There is no evidence to support Contreras' statements.

Many of Contreras' patients came from the United States, where use of laetrile is not approved by the Food and Drug Administration. Since the 1970s, the use of Laetrile to treat cancer has been described in the scientific literature as a canonical example of quackery and has never been shown to be effective in the treatment or prevention of cancer.

== See also ==
- List of ineffective cancer treatments
