= Coffee enema =

Injection of coffee into the colon

A coffee enema is the injection of coffee into the rectum and colon via the anus, i.e., as an enema. There is no scientific evidence to support any positive health claim for this practice, and medical authorities advise that the procedure may be dangerous. Coffee enemas are an important part of Gerson therapy, a discredited alternative cancer treatment that was promoted by the Gerson Institute in the 1970s.

== Efficacy and safety ==
No medical or scientific evidence supports any claim of detoxification or anti-cancer effect of coffee enemas.

Coffee enemas carry a risk of adverse effects, some of them serious, including infection, colitis, seizures, heart and lung problems, and death.

== History ==
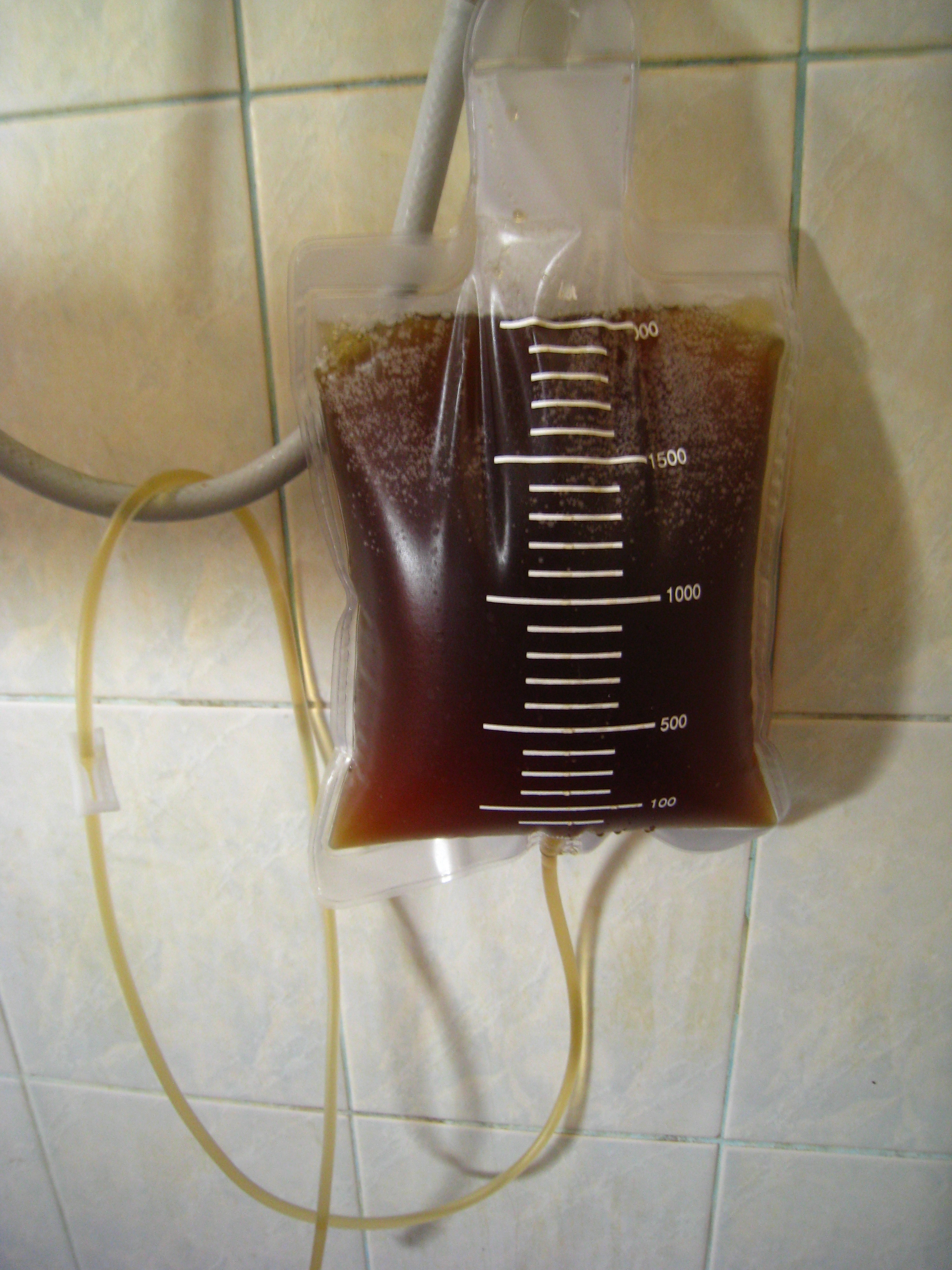
Apparatus prepared for injecting a coffee enema

The rationale for using enemas can be traced back to the earliest medical texts, to the prescientific misconception that the accumulation of faeces in the intestines can lead to autointoxication and that the "cleansing" of the intestines can prevent that.

The practice of colon cleansing experienced a renaissance in the 1990s, and at that time, coffee enemas were used as alternative cancer treatments. Their frequent use is a feature of Gerson therapy and Kelley therapy, ineffective alternative cancer therapies. Their use is promoted with claims they can "detoxify" the body by boosting the function of the gallbladder and liver. Coffee enemas were also mentioned in early 20th-century medical literature as a remedy for constipation. The scientific literature does not show any evidence that the procedure is effective, but does report adverse effects from self-administered coffee enemas, including death in rare cases.

Advocates of coffee enemas often point to their inclusion in editions of the Merck Manual through 1972, where coffee is listed as an ingredient for a retention enema for treating constipation. The Merck Manual does not list any other uses for coffee enemas, and in editions after 1972 all mention of them was dropped.

== Gerson therapy ==
Gerson therapy is an alternative treatment developed by Dr. Max Gerson in the early 20th century, primarily aimed at treating cancer and other degenerative diseases. The therapy emphasizes a strict organic vegetarian diet, nutritional supplements, and coffee enemas, which are believed to detoxify the body and strengthen the immune system. Proponents claim that this regimen can restore metabolic balance and promote healing; however, there is no scientific evidence supporting its efficacy. Health organizations, including the National Cancer Institute, warn against using Gerson therapy as a substitute for conventional cancer treatments due to its unproven nature and potential risks.

== See also ==
- List of unproven and disproven cancer treatments
- Naturopathy
