= Nutrition and Cancer =

- Discipline: Nutrition, oncology
- Language: English
- Edited by: Leonard A. Cohen

Publication details
- History: 1978-present
- Publisher: Routledge
- Frequency: 8/year
- Impact factor: 2.322 (2014)

Standard abbreviations
- ISO 4: Nutr. Cancer

Indexing
- CODEN: NUCADQ
- ISSN: 0163-5581 (print); 1532-7914 (web)
- OCLC no.: 04415504

Links
- Journal homepage; Online access; Online archive

Nutrition and Cancer is a peer-reviewed medical journal covering research on the role of nutritional factors in causing or preventing cancer. It is published eight times a year by Routledge. According to the Journal Citation Reports, the journal has a 2014 impact factor of 2.322.
