= Max Gerson =

German-American physician (1881–1959)

- Born: October 18, 1881; Wongrowitz, Province of Posen, Kingdom of Prussia, German Empire
- Died: March 8, 1959 (aged 77); New York City, U.S.
- Citizenship: American (from 1942)
- Education: Albert Ludwig University of Freiburg
- Occupation: Physician
- Years active: c. 1909–1958
- Known for: Gerson therapy, a dietary-based alternative cancer treatment

Max Gerson (October 18, 1881 – March 8, 1959) was a German-born American physician who developed the Gerson therapy, a pseudoscientific dietary-based alternative cancer treatment that he falsely claimed could cure cancer and most chronic, degenerative diseases. Gerson therapy involves a plant-based diet with coffee enemas, ozone enemas, dietary supplements, and raw calf liver extract; the latter was discontinued in the 1980s after patients were hospitalized for bacterial infections.

Gerson described his approach in the book A Cancer Therapy: Results of 50 Cases (1958). The National Cancer Institute evaluated Gerson's claims and concluded that his data showed no benefit from his treatment. The therapy is both ineffective and dangerous. Serious illness and deaths have resulted from Gerson therapy.

== Early life and career ==
Gerson was born to a Jewish family in Wongrowitz, German Empire (Wągrowiec, now in Poland), on October 18, 1881.

Gerson was the third of nine children born to Bernhard Gerson and Ulricke Gerson, nee Abraham.

== Education ==
Gerson attended the local Jewish school in Wongrowitz, and later studied medicine in Breslau, Wurzburg and Berlin before graduating from the Albert Ludwig University of Freiburg in 1909.

== Medical career ==
He began practicing medicine at age 28 in Breslau (Wrocław, now in Poland), later specializing in internal medicine and nerve diseases in Bielefeld. By 1927, he was specializing in the treatment of tuberculosis, developing the Gerson-Sauerbruch-Hermannsdorfer diet, claiming it was a major advance in the treatment of tuberculosis. Initially, he used his therapy as a supposed treatment for migraine headaches and tuberculosis. In 1928, he began to use it as a claimed treatment for cancer. When the Nazis came to power in 1933 Gerson left Germany, emigrating to Vienna, where he worked in the West End Sanatorium. Gerson spent two years in Vienna, before moving to France in 1935, associating with a clinic near Paris before moving to London in 1936. Shortly thereafter, he moved to the United States, settling in New York City.

== In the United States ==
Gerson emigrated to the United States in 1936, passed his medical board examination, and became a U.S. citizen in 1942. In the U.S., Gerson applied his dietary therapy to several cancer patients, claiming good results, but other workers found his methodology and claims unconvincing. Proponents of Gerson therapy believe a conspiracy headed by the medical establishment prevented Gerson from publishing proof that his therapy worked. In 1958, Gerson published a book in which he claimed to have cured 50 terminal cancer patients: A Cancer Therapy: Results of 50 Cases. In 1953, Gerson's malpractice insurance was discontinued and, in 1958, his medical license in New York was suspended for two years.

== Personal life and death ==
Gerson married Margaret Rose Hope; they had three daughters. His daughter Charlotte founded the Gerson Institute after his death.

Gerson died on March 8, 1959, of pneumonia. A conspiracy theory has subsequently spread that Gerson was murdered following a lifetime of supposed persecution.

== Gerson therapy ==
Initially, Gerson used his therapy as a treatment for migraine headaches and tuberculosis. In 1928, he began to use it as a supposed treatment for cancer.

Gerson therapy is based on the belief that cancer is the result of a deteriorating metabolism from an impaired liver function. Gerson therapy aims to restore the body to health by repairing the liver and return metabolism to its normal state. The therapy promotes the idea that cancer is caused by alteration of cell metabolism by processed food and toxic environmental substances which alter its sodium and potassium content. It also emphasizes limiting sodium and increasing potassium intake to detoxify the liver. Coffee enemas are said to cause excretion of toxic breakdown products by the liver and through the colon wall. None of these ideas are supported by scientific research. Gerson commented that his therapy aimed to create a "near normal condition of the oxidizing system in the body, to which malignant cells with the fermentation system cannot adapt".

Gerson therapy claims to treat the disease by having patients consume a plant-based diet including hourly glasses of vegetable juice, raw calf's liver extracts and various dietary supplements. Meals are restricted to baked potatoes, oatmeal, salad, cooked and raw vegetables and fruits. Meat and dairy is excluded and only introduced in small amounts back into the diet after 4 or 6 weeks. Berries, nuts, salt, vegetable oils and drinking water are forbidden indefinitely. All canned, frozen and refined foods are excluded and a special grinder and press is required for juicing.

In addition, patients receive enemas of coffee, castor oil and hydrogen peroxide or ozone. Since 1983, Gerson therapy has involved the use of ozone enemas, where up to 150 mg of ozone is administered rectally.

After Gerson's death, his daughter Charlotte Gerson (March 25, 1922 - February 10, 2019) continued to promote the therapy, founding the "Gerson Institute" in 1977. The original protocol also included raw calf's liver taken orally, but this practice was discontinued in the 1980s after ten patients were hospitalized (five of them comatose) from January 1979 to March 1981 in San Diego, California, area hospitals due to infection with the rare bacterium Campylobacter fetus. This infection was seen only in those following Gerson-type therapy with raw liver (no other cases of patients having sepsis with this microbe, a pathogen in cattle, had been reported to Centers for Disease Control and Prevention in the previous two years). Nine of ten hospitalized patients had been treated in Tijuana, Mexico; the tenth followed Gerson therapy at home. One of these patients who had metastatic melanoma died within a week of his septic episode. Many of the patients had low sodium levels, thought to be associated with the very low sodium Gerson diet. The photographer Garry Winogrand died of gallbladder cancer in a Gerson Clinic in Tijuana.

=== Evidence ===
Gerson's therapy has not been independently tested or subjected to randomized controlled trials, and thus is illegal to market in the United States. The Gerson Institute promotes the therapy by citing patient testimonials and other anecdotal evidence. Gerson published a book discussing the alleged success of the therapy in 50 patients, but a review by the U.S. National Cancer Institute was unable to find any evidence that Gerson's claims were accurate. The NCI found that no in vivo animal studies had been conducted. Similarly, case series by Gerson Institute staff published in the alternative medical literature suffered from methodological flaws, and no independent entity has been able to reproduce the claims.

Attempts to independently check the results of the therapy have been negative. A group of 13 patients sickened by elements of the Gerson therapy were evaluated in hospitals in San Diego in the early 1980s; all 13 were found to still have active cancer. An investigation by Quackwatch found that the institute's claims of cure were based not on actual documentation of survival, but on "a combination of the doctor's estimate that the departing patient has a 'reasonable chance of surviving', plus feelings that the Institute staff have about the status of people who call in".

The American Cancer Society reported that "[t]here is no reliable scientific evidence that Gerson therapy is effective in treating cancer, and the principles behind it are not widely accepted by the medical community. It is not approved for use in the United States." In 1947, the National Cancer Institute reviewed 10 claimed cures submitted by Gerson; however, all of the patients were receiving standard anticancer treatment simultaneously, making it impossible to determine what effect, if any, was due to Gerson's therapy. A review of the Gerson therapy by Memorial Sloan-Kettering Cancer Center concluded: "If proponents of such therapies wish them to be evaluated scientifically and considered valid adjuvant treatments, they must provide extensive records (more than simple survival rates) and conduct controlled, prospective studies as evidence". In 1959, the National Cancer Institute (NCI) again reviewed cases of patients treated by Gerson. The NCI found that the available information did not prove the regimen had benefit. Cancer Research UK states that "Available scientific evidence does not support any claims that Gerson therapy can treat cancer [...] Gerson therapy can be very harmful to your health."

=== Safety concerns ===
Gerson therapy can lead to several significant health problems. Serious illness and death have occurred as a direct result of some portions of the treatment, including severe electrolyte imbalances. Proponents of the therapy advise ceasing conventional cancer treatment, and this further risks causing harm.

Continued use of enemas may weaken the colon's normal function, causing or worsening constipation and colitis. Other complications have included dehydration, serious infections and severe bleeding.

The therapy is not recommended for pregnant or breast-feeding women and certain cancers and illnesses.

Coffee enemas have contributed to the deaths of at least three people in the United States. Coffee enemas "can cause colitis (inflammation of the bowel), fluid and electrolyte imbalances, and in some cases septicemia". The recommended diet may not be nutritionally adequate. The diet has been blamed for the deaths of patients who substituted it for standard medical care.

Jessica Ainscough, better known as "The Wellness Warrior", was a major proponent of the Gerson diet after her diagnosis with cancer. She rejected medical treatment and followed the diet strictly, documenting her progress in a popular blog. She died from her untreated cancer in February 2015, aged 29.

== See also ==
- Chelation therapy
- List of diets
- List of unproven and disproven cancer treatments
- Belle Gibson
