= Fred J. Hart (businessman) =

American alternative medicine practitioner (1888–1976)

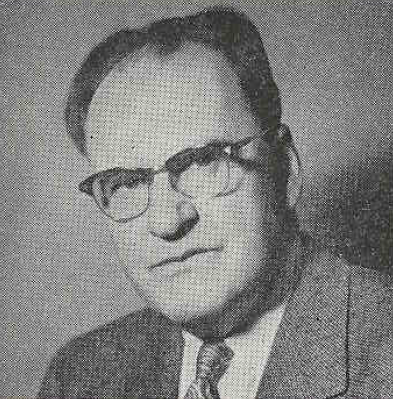
- Born: Frederick James Hart; August 20, 1888; Tacoma, Washington, US
- Died: March 29, 1975 (aged 86); Capitola, California, US
- Occupations: Real estate, businessman, farmer
- Organization: National Health Federation
- Known for: radionics
- Spouses: Eva Porter (m. 1914) Dorothy S. Bobby (m. 1963)
- Children: Margaret Hart Packard Surbeck

Fred J. Hart (August 20, 1888 – March 29, 1975) was an American alternative medicine practitioner, farmer and businessman. Hart owned KQW AM in San Jose, CA. He was active in the field of radionics, was president of the Electronic Medical Foundation until the American Medical Association and Food and Drug Administration shut the Foundation down for false medical claims. Hart then established the National Health Federation (NHF) in 1955 advocating for "health freedom", which critics say "has little interest in scientifically recognized methods". The AMA called Hart a quack and his treatment quackery, a claim that Hart himself used with pride.

== Early life and education ==
Hart was one of seven children born and raised in Tacoma, Washington. He graduated from McMinnville College (now called Linfield University) in McMinnville, Oregon.

== Career ==
Before 1913, Hart had managed the Washington branch of the Puyallup and Sumner Fruit Growers' association and was advocating for using some of the same procedures for opening a cannery in Terra Bella, California. The Terra Bella cannery opened in 1913 with Hart elected as its first manager. In 1925 Hart relocated from the Salinas Valley to San Jose, California "for the health of his daughter" but building apartment buildings in Salinas, California. By 1938 Hart was back living in Salinas and serving on the Monterey County Farm Bureau. Advising Monterey County to adopt a $165,000 bond to purchase land in Fort Ord, California, in 1940 based on his experience as a farmer and land owner that the property will be worth more later, and will help the war effort and the Army bringing over 2,000 families to the area who will purchase the agriculture of the area. In 1940, Hart was elected the president of the Salinas YMCA.

His obituary says he was a "founder of the California Farm Bureau, the Monterey County Farm Bureau and the American Farm Bureau Federation and published a group of newspapers for farm bureau members". One newsletter was called Farm Bureau Monthly. A 1944 paid advertisement when Hart was running for a congressional seat stated that Hart "became publisher of 42 agricultural magazines in this state. As a member of the executive committee of the California Farm Bureau federation, he helped promote bulk handling of grain in California, with the result that four bulk handling elevators were constructed, one of them in Salinas. He helped organize the Growers' Tariff league which was responsible for securing tariffs on California fruits and nuts, on which tariffs had been removed by a Democratic administration."

== Radio ==
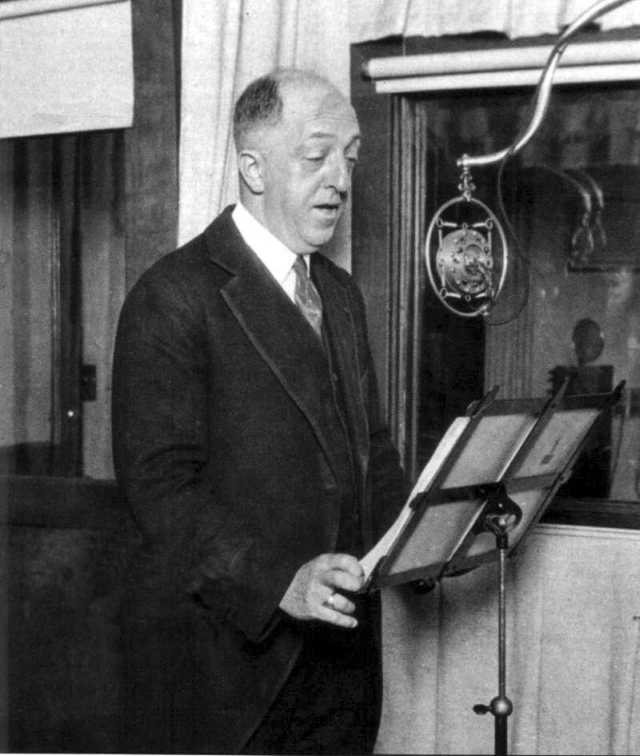
Doc Herrold is shown at the microphone of KQW, early 1920s.

Licensed to Charles "Doc" Herrold in 1921, KQW broadcast from its home in San Jose. Funded by Herrold's radio laboratory, he found that he could no longer afford the station and gave it to the First Baptist Church of San Jose, California. In 1925 the U.S. Commerce Department transferred title to the church which became responsible for all costs of operation, also the transmission power was moved up from 50 watts to 500 watts. The church raised the $20,000 needed to purchase and install a new transmitter, higher antenna, and new studio. The church realized that they would not be able to afford the day-to-day expenses of running a radio station and asked Herrold to assume the job of sales manager as he was so well known in the community. Advertisements on the radio was a new concept and Herrold worked to find program sponsorships and advertisements. The church quickly learned that the religious shows they were broadcasting were not money makers and the Pastor asked Fred Hart who was one of the church parishioners to manage the station. Hart refused a salary, instead opting for one hour every day to run a "radio newspaper for agriculture".

Believing that farm families made up 30% of the population, Hart thought that KQW could become the "voice of California agriculture". One of the first tasks Hart completed was to move the towers off church property because the tax collector assessed the whole church property as the radio station was a business. Hart hired Ira L. Smith from Santa Cruz to run the business and administration side of the business. Hart also promised the church that it would run a Sunday church service for the next twenty years.

In 1926 KQW gave the California Farm Bureau a large bump in publicity with its program California Farm Bureau Evening Radio news that aired six days a week (not Sunday) from 6:30–8:00 pm. Many topics in farming were discussed, some examples mentioned in a Visalia Times-Delta article were "different types of brush cutters; non-cultivated Thompson Seedless vineyard; effect of heavy cultivation heavy summer shoot thinning on Emperors ... results of spraying to control Spanish Measles".

Hart and Smith learned that they were interfering with the tradition of distant listening also called a distant-fishing period, which had been held weekly between 7:30 and 8:00pm. This meant that the local stations would go off the air for 30 minutes during which time listeners would try to tune in distant stations. With KQW broadcasting during that 30 minutes, listeners could only find KQW. Critics began to call KQW the "Napoleon of KQW" or "Haywire Hart". Because the transmitter had such a strong signal, "it drowned out nearly all competition". Hart argued that KQW could put San Jose on the map if the critics could give him more time to grow an audience with farmers. Hart eventually sold KQW to the Columbia Broadcasting System which operates it as KCBS in San Francisco. Because KQW (now KCBS) recognizes 1909 as its beginning (when Herrold got his very first radio license), it is known as "The World's First Broadcasting Station" and celebrated its 100th birthday in 2009 with a series of events over the year in the Bay Area.

During Hawaiian vacations in 1931 and 1934 Hart noticed that there was possibilities for growth in the Hawaiian radio market. He became president and general manager of the Honolulu Broadcasting Company bringing in new management, upgraded microphones, expanded on-air to 17-hours and moved to a new radio center in 1936. He owned and operated KGMB and KHBC in Hawaii until 1938.

== Politics ==
In 1944 Hart ran as a Republican in California's 11th congressional district, which consisted of Monterey, San Luis Obispo, Santa Barbara, and Ventura counties. He lost the election to Democratic incumbent George E. Outland.

== Electronic Medical Foundation ==
In 1938 Hart became president and Board Chairman of the College of Electronic Medicine which was founded by Albert Abrams in 1922. The CEM leased out and used devices to diagnose and cure medical afflictions based on the work of Abrams who called this system radionics. Abrams who died in 1924 said the CEM was "based [on] his theory that all disease is a 'disharmony of electronic oscillation'". After Abrams death, Hart took over and renamed the organization the Electronic Medical Foundation (EMF). According to the EMF website Hart became interested in radionics when his wife Eva, who had had surgery for her breast cancer but was dying wanted to use a (now common) frequency device to cure her. "[H]e (according to the EMF) was the target of the American Medical Association. Eva died inside of a needless political and greedy one-sided battle. He loved her. All he wanted was to help Eva to live, but the AMA shut him down and it cost Eva her very life". Also from the EMF website this statement that after Eva had been found to have a cancerous tumor she still was having symptoms which is when they first visited the Abrams clinic. She was tested with one of the instruments and found to have "a lesion which had not been detected by the other doctors". She was given treatments with the Oscilloclast, spinal adjustments and diet changes which "were credited with her recovery". The tests by the radionic machine were later reviewed by the FDA and claimed "worthless".

According to Stephen Barrett the EMF in 1954 were ordered "by a U.S. District Court to stop distributing thirteen devices with false claims that they could diagnose and treat hundreds of diseases and conditions". Soon after the Food and Drug Administration (FDA) stopped health food stores from selling information from the EMF. The NHF website describes this as "violated[ing] freedom of the press by declaring it illegal for health food stores to give away, lend or sell books and reprints to inform customers about their products". And "Abrams was branded a “quack” by the AMA and his electronic therapy “quackery,” even though it was never tested for validity by his accusers".

Author Gilbert Geis in his book White-Collar Criminal describes that the clinic would accept a sample of blood mailed to them on a piece of paper and was inserted in something called a Radioscope which was supposed to measure "emanations" of diseases. The Radioscope was connected to a box which was held by a clinic employee, another employee would strike the first employee on the stomach with a plastic wand. When the wand would stick to the stomach, a reaction would happen and the machine operator would know the "exact identity, location and significance of any disease affecting the patient – perhaps thousands of miles away". The patent would seek out treatment from one of the practitioners who leased Hart's machines to receive treatment. The FDA found all thirteen of Hart's devices to be "worthless" and the Radioscope "flunked its every test during the FDA investigation. It couldn't tell the difference between colored water and blood, between the blood of a living man and a dead one. ... Blood from a rooster brought a diagnosis of sinus infection and dental caries".

Martin Gardner wrote in 1957 that the FDA had "obtained an injunction against interstate shipment of the devices" and determined that the machines contained "nothing but low powered short wave radio transmitters and coils capable of producing a weak magnetic effect". A sample send to the EMF from a woman's blood was told after testing that she suffered from '"systematic toxemia"' yet what the government had submitted was a "spot of coal-tar dye". Hart, according to Gardner, "raised the usual howls of persecution by the medical trusts and vowed he would continue his great work in Germany and Mexico if necessary".

Someone must teach new things, Someone must take the abuse, Someone must be ostracized, Someone must be called a fraud and a quack. Then out of all of it comes the new truth to become a part of us… Thus we receive new facts to make up our proud possession of knowledge.

— Fred J. Hart,

== National Health Federation ==
After the AMA ordered the Electronic Medical Foundation to close, Hart founded and managed the National Health Federation in 1955. The NHF claims that it is "the oldest health freedom organization on the planet, the ONLY such organization working to protect individuals’ rights to choose to consume healthy food, take supplements and use alternative therapies without government restrictions". Barrett says "NHF wants anyone who merely claims to have an effective treatment or product to be allowed to market it without scientific proof that it works. ... NHF promotes questionable health methods and has little interest in scientifically recognized methods".

== Personal life ==
Hart was married September 23, 1914, to Eva Porter, daughter of Robert Porter of the Blanco area of Salinas, Monterey County, California. She was the granddaughter of James Bardin, one of the original settlers in Monterey County. Eva Hart died January 27, 1962, in Palo Alto, California; she had been one of the founders and board members of The Salinas Rescue Mission. A memorial fund was established for the organization at her death.

Their only child, Margaret Hart, graduated with a B.S. in education from Stanford University in 1937. She married IBM executive Gordon Packard in 1960; he died in 1970. In 1976 she married attorney Leighton Homer Surbeck, who had been a law clerk to U.S. Chief Justice William Howard Taft. She served on many boards: Golden Gate University, Eastern Baptist College, Judson College, the First Baptist Church in Menlo Park, California, and American Baptist Seminary of the West in Berkeley, California. Margaret Hart Surbeck inherited her father's collection of Oscilloclasts and other devices. Along with her second husband, Surbeck participated in the research of "the potential of electromagnetic radiation therapy". A research project using "low level radio frequency energy was applied to cancerous mice and the effect measured by tumor growth and health of the specimen was completed at the South Dakota School of Mines. At her death, Margaret Surbeck's will funded INDNJC, health-related research though University of California, San Francisco.

On September 1, 1963, Fred Hart married Dorothy S. Bobby in Santa Cruz, California.

He died at the Capitola Extended Care Hospital. His wife Dorothy survived him; she lived in Santa Cruz at the time of his death in 1975.

== See also ==
- Desiré Dubounet
- Ruth B. Drown
- Hulda Regehr Clark
- Thomas Galen Hieronymus
- Georges Lakhovsky
- Antoine Prioré (inventor of the "Electropoise")
- Royal Raymond Rife
- Hercules Sanche
- George de la Warr
