= Bioelectromagnetic medicine =

Bioelectromagnetic medicine deals with the phenomenon of resonance signaling and discusses how specific frequencies modulate cellular function to restore or maintain health. Such electromagnetic (EM) signals are then called medical information, which are used in health informatics.

== Bioelectromagnetics ==
Bioelectromagnetics refers to the ability to study live cells, tissues, and organisms that produce electromagnetic fields. Bioelectromagnetism is mostly studied via electrophysiological techniques.

Some of the electrophysiological monitoring methods such as electroencephalography (EEG) and electrocardiography (ECG or EKG) measure the electrical activity of the brain and heart via the installation of electrodes placed on the skin. Recorded evoked potential (EP) amplitudes tend to be low, ranging from tens of microvolts for EEG, millivolts for electromyography (EMG), and about 20 millivolts for ECG.

Other electrophysiological monitoring techniques such as evoked spinal cord potential (ESCP), somatosensory evoked potential (SEP) and SSEP (short-latency SEP) could be coupled with ECG, which then present excitatory ECG-triggered SSEP technique. The amplitude of the EP or evoked response is usually interpreted as the severity of the biological entities' response toward the applied electromagnetic field. Evoked potentials are merely acquired when the applied excitation is more than the excitation threshold of the biological entity. In such cases, excitatory input voltages are applied in different modes, by a stimulation rate of 0.1 to 100 Hz, current stimulation amplitudes of 0 to 200 mA and load resistance of 1 kΩ, which gives 0-200 mV amplitude (in case of constant resistance) and 40 mW electrical power. In some cases, stimulation module of ESCP, SEP, and SSEP techniques is similar to pulsed electromagnetic field (PEMF) generators.

== Pulsed electromagnetic field therapy ==
Development of pulsed electromagnetic field (PEMF) therapy has been problematical because of the lack of scientifically-derived, evidence-based knowledge of the mechanism of action. For example, PEMF therapy used by plastic surgeons the management of postsurgical pain and edema, has been criticized for not having a body of evidence for improving physical function and pain relief.

An examination of why few orthopedic surgeons used electric stimulation for treatment of bone fractures, despite evidence of positive outcomes, concluded that high costs and inconsistent results were the principal reasons.

Pulsed radio-frequency fields (PRF) are a subsection of PEMFs, which then divide to thermal and non-thermal, based on the energy that delivers to the biological object. PRF should not be confused with electromagnetic therapy (EMT), which is also known as radionics. EMT is a form of alternative medicine, which is inspired by holistic medicine logic. Producers of EMT devices claim that they can cure people by "balancing" their discordant energies, according to alternative and holistic medicine references.

== Biofeedback ==
The approach of receiving information (feedback) from the body (bio) is named "biofeedback". Psychiatric disorders, anxiety disorders and neurological disorders are diseases that are targeted by biofeedback. In a type of biofeedback, called neurofeedback, the placement of the patient in the circuit of EMG can reduce symptoms of musculoskeletal disorders.

== FDA approved and registered devices ==
FDA provides two different services when it comes to PEMF devices. When a PEMF device is FDA registered, it means that the FDA is aware of the fact that this device is imported into the USA. On the other hand, FDA approval confirms that a PEMF device has health benefits to treat a specific health condition. Since PEMF devices need to be condition-specific, either of PEMF devices that are inspired by holistic medicine or alternative medicine ideas, which treat a wide range of health conditions, will not be completely approved by the FDA.

=== FDA labels ===
The FDA decides which FDA labels to grant to a medical device. There are three main classes of medical devices according to the potential risk that they might have on human health.

Class 1 – Very low-risk devices and drugs. For example, dental floss and bedpans.

Class 2 – Devices with a higher risk than Class 1. For example, condoms and pregnancy tests.

Class 3 – Devices with a very high risk to human health. For example, pacemakers and heart valves.

If the device labeling makes new or remote use of the currently marketed similar devices, the FDA places it into Class 3, which will need premarket approval (PMA) before marketing. Class two medical devices only need to be cleared by the FDA. This means that the FDA will not test them itself. In those instances where a device is substantially equivalent to an existing device, a firm should attempt to obtain 510(k) clearance rather than go for premarket approval. For example, orthofix produces different PEMF devices that decrease markers of inflammation, which has been utilized in clinical studies to treat osteoarthritis, epicondylitis, and rotator cuff tears, but only PHYSIO-STIM I & II MODEL 6000 & 7000 are FDA approved that are used for the treatment of long-bone non-unions fracture. The same story applies to other devices that are produced by Biomove. By this regard, only certain models that are provided by Biomove company, such as Biomove 3000, 5000, are FDA cleared because they are substantially equivalent to the FDA approved device like NeuroMove (NM900 device, Dan Med, Inc).

=== Allowed specific absorption rate ===
According to the FDA's criteria for significant risk investigations of magnetic resonance, the specific absorption rate (SAR) that a medical device is licensed to deliver to the body is limited to certain electrical power during a limited time. The SAR for whole body and head is less than 4 and 3.2 Watt per kilogram, which should not exceed 15 and 10 minutes, respectively. In case that body is exposed to a static magnetic field, the amplitude of the magnetic field should not exceed 4 and 8 tesla for infants and adults, respectively. By this regard, some of the PEMF devices such as MDcure, Aerotel Ltd., (Holon, Israel) and Aerotel Inc. (USA, New York, NY, USA) are categorized as FDA Class-1 therapeutic device since they deliver extremely low-intensity electromagnetic field with nanotesla amplitude (nT; 10^{−9}) at a set of low frequencies (1–100 Hz). Such PEMF devices must not be confused with EMT devices, which are accused of Class I recall.

A device that has either licensed SAR or standard instrumentation does not approve its marketing. FDA only gives PMA certificates or clearance to medical devices that have a mechanism of action beside a diagnostic/therapeutic efficiency.
