= Georges Lakhovsky =

French engineer and writer (1869–1942)

- Born: 17 September 1870; Ilya, Minsk Region, Russian Empire
- Died: 31 August 1942 (aged 71); New York City, U.S.
- Resting place: Passy Cemetery, Paris
- Other name: Georges Lakhovski
- Education: Engineering Institute of Odessa
- Known for: Multiple wave oscillator (An alternative medical device)

Georges Lakhovsky (born Georgei Lakhovsky; Russian: Георгий Лаховский; 17 September 1869 – 31 August 1942) was a Russian-French engineer, author, and inventor.

== Life ==
Lakhovsky's controversial medical treatment invention, the Multiple Wave Oscillator, is described as having been used by him in the treatment of cancer. The main circuit basically consists of concentric rings forming electrical dipole antennas having capacitive gaps opposing each other by 180° (called Lakhovsky antennas). The circuit is fed with high voltage and high frequency impulses from a generator, usually a spark gap Tesla coil or Oudin coil. If set up correctly, the unit is supposed to create a broad band frequency spectrum of low amplitude, covering a much greater range of frequencies, from 1 Hz to 300 GHz, than those of the exciting generator (usually several 100 kHz to a few MHz from a Tesla transformer or several kilohertz from an induction coil). The power of each individual frequency in this broad band noise spectrum is very low. In order to create more harmonics and sub-harmonics, an additional spark gap on the secondary side has been found in some devices, being mounted directly on the antenna, or being mounted in parallel to the secondary coil.

In 1940 Lakhovsky emigrated from Europe to the United States via Portugal. He left Lisbon on 23 November aboard the liner Nyassa, and arrived in New York on 4 December.

== Works ==
- The Secret of Life, London: William Heinemann (Medical Books), Ltd., 1939; Modern edition 2007 ISBN 978-142092995-9.
- L'Origine de la vie: La radiation et les êtres vivants [The Origin of Life: Radiation and Living Beings] (in French). Paris: Gauthier-Villars. 1925. OCLC 806366827.
- Les ondes qui guérissent [The Waves that Heal] (in French). Paris: C.O.L.Y.S.A. 1926. OCLC 771602260.
- La Terre et Nous (The Earth and Us) (in French) 1933; modern edition ISBN 978-29-5429-444-5.
- La civilisation et la folie raciste [Civilization and Racist Madness] (in French). Paris: S.A.C.L. 1939. OCLC 16522791.

== See also ==
- Antoine Prioré – Italian cancer researcher (1912–1983)
- Bioelectromagnetics – Study of electromagnetic fields and biological entity interaction
- Electromagnetic therapy – Therapies using magnetism
- Energy medicine – Pseudoscientific alternative medicine
- Flexner Report – 1910 North American report on medical education
- Hulda Regehr Clark – Canadian naturopath and author (1928–2009)
- Pseudoscience – Unscientific claims presented as scientific
- Radionics – Form of alternative medicine
- Royal Rife – American inventor (1888–1971)
