= The Order of Christian Mystics =

20th-century spiritual order

The Order of Christian Mystics was a 20th-century spiritual order that was promulgated to give to the Western world advanced Christian mysticism based on the Western mystery school tradition.

The order was founded in Philadelphia in 1908 by Harriette Augusta and Frank Homer Curtiss. Its original name was The Order of the Fifteen, but it was later changed to The Order of Christian Mystics. Their intent was to combine Theosophy with traditional Christian doctrine. Their teachings were transmitted through Harriette by the Founder of the Theosophical Society, Helena Petrovna Blavatsky, otherwise simply referred to as The Teacher of the Order.

The teachings of the order were promulgated mainly through a system of correspondence, extensive publishing of books and delivering of lectures at many centres. Their pupils numbered many thousands in over 70 countries. Mainly their works were aimed at the American esoteric fraternity, for it was believed that America would remain the spiritually dominant nation regarding Western mysticism for many years to come.

The spiritual philosophy as espoused by this Order was based on a system of personal regeneration, otherwise called spiritual alchemy, by transmuting the base creative energy, through Divine purity, prayer, devotion, study and meditation. This was put forth in the Western mystical tradition, a system of mysticism suitable for the Western culture and mindset, encompassing a new interpretation on all former teachings given under the names of Rosicrucianism, Gnosticism and the Western mystery school teachings.

The published works of their Teacher, Helena Petrovna Blavatsky, was mainly aimed at making available to the Western world the ancient Teachings of the East. This new effort had as its aim the promulgation of Christian mysticism based on the life and teachings of the Master Jesus and a mystical interpretation of the Bible, especially the works of the New Testament.

Together through Hierarchy, Teacher, Order and inner circle they published 27 bound volumes of mystical teachings running over many editions, answering letters, delivering lectures, demonstrations and services across the USA over a 40-year period. It has only been in recent years (2009) that the combined works of the Order have once more seen the light of day and have been made available to all in the public domain.

Harriette Augusta Curtiss, co-founder of The Order of Christian Mystics and later the Universal Religious Foundation, was born in Philadelphia, Pennsylvania, in 1856. Her parents were John Horace Brown, organizer of the Pennsylvania State Teachers' Association and Emma Brightly Brown. Curtiss received a cultured education and developed into a talented musician and actress. After starring in a number of amateur theatrical productions she had the opportunity to become a professional, but her mother dissuaded her from doing so. She therefore put her writing talents to use for many years, authoring a column for The Philadelphia Inquirer under the pen name "The Bachelor Girl." As the years passed, Curtiss found herself to be a gifted clairvoyant, developing a direct contact with that ascended teacher known as Madame Blavatsky and eventually launched a career in the realm of mysticism.

In 1907 she married Dr Frank Homer Curtiss, and together they began working as occult teachers and writers. In the year of their marriage they founded The Order of the 15, which in 1908 became known as The Order of Christian Mystics. Harriette, who became known within the order as Rahmea, assumed the role of teacher, and her husband took the position of secretary (and was known by his order name of Pyrahmos). They worked together to prepare material for publication, though Harriette was the primary author. Throughout the rest of her life, she issued monthly lessons for students.

The Curtiss' produced more than 27 books and publications. The first was compiled from Harriette's written responses to questions from students and was titled Letters from the Teacher (1909). Her early lessons were combined in The Voice of Isis (1912), which became the order's basic introductory text. Later a more advanced text was published under the title The Message of Aquaria (1921). The Curtiss' wrote several books during World War I, including The War Crisis (1914) or The Philosophy of War, being a philosophical treatise on the mystical causes of war, and The Key to the Universe (1915). In the latter volume they contended that all personal experiences are expressions of one great law based on mathematical principles and that the "unfoldment of the godlike possibilities inherent in each Soul follows, step by step, the same order of events that is followed in the evolution of the Cosmos, and that such steps are symbolized by the first 22 numbers". Realms of the Living Dead: A Brief Description of Life after Death appeared in 1917. In 1919 they published a sequel to The Key to the Universe titled The Key of Destiny. Many more books followed in later years.

During the war the Curtiss' founded the Church of the Wisdom Religion, a less exclusive group than their earlier order. In 1929 after the Curtiss' moved to Washington, D.C., the church was incorporated as the Universal Religious Foundation.

After suffering from a long mystical illness towards the end of her life, Harriette Augusta Curtiss entered transition on the 22nd of September 1932 in Washington, D.C., and followed her Teacher, Madame Blavatsky, into the Higher Realms. She had reached the age of 76. Dr. Frank Homer Curtiss maintained a successful healing practice until his passing in 1946 and implemented a constructive and truly holistic healing practice, side by side with the highest mystical Teachings of the Order. This encompassed specialized dieting, in vogue to this day and radionics, then still in its infancy. Frank Homer Curtiss, many years younger than Harriette, re-married in 1937 to Eleanor Chapman Stevens who helped him to continue his work until his passing. She became the sole heir and executor of his estate and it is assumed the keeper of the archives of the Order at Homers passing. Homer entered transition in 1946 at the age of 71.

== Publications ==
- FH and HA Curtiss, The Voice of Isis, Curtiss Book Co., 1st Ed.
- FH and HA Curtiss, The Message of Aquaria, Curtiss Philosophic Book Co., 7th Ed.
- FH and HA Curtiss, The Inner Radiance, Curtiss Philosophic Book Co., 3rd Ed.
- FH and HA Curtiss, Realms of the Living Dead, Curtiss Philosophic Book Co., 5th Ed.
- FH and HA Curtiss, Coming World Changes, Curtiss Philosophic Book Co., 1st Ed.
- FH and HA Curtiss, The Key to the Universe, Curtiss Philosophic Book Co., 7th Ed.
- FH and HA Curtiss, The Key of Destiny, Curtiss Philosophic Book Co., 3rd Ed.
- FH and HA Curtiss, Letters from the Teacher Volume 1, Curtiss Book Co., 1st Ed.
- FH and HA Curtiss, Letters from the Teacher Volume 2, Curtiss Philosophic Book Co., 1924.
- FH and HA Curtiss, The Truth about Evolution and the Bible, Curtiss Philosophic Book Co., 2nd Ed.
- FH and HA Curtiss, The Philosophy of War, Curtiss Book Co., 1st Ed.
- FH and HA Curtiss, Personal Survival, Curtiss Philosophic Book Co., 1st Ed.
- FH and HA Curtiss, The Pattern Life, Curtiss Philosophic Book Co., 2nd Ed.
- FH and HA Curtiss, Four-Fold Health, Curtiss Philosophic Book Co., 2nd Ed.
- FH and HA Curtiss, Vitamins, Curtiss Philosophic Book Co., 1st Ed.
- FH and HA Curtiss, Why Are We Here?, David McKay Co., 1st Ed.
- FH and HA Curtiss, Reincarnation, Willing Publishing Co., 1949.
- EO Curtiss, For Young Souls, Curtiss Philosophic Book Co., 1st Ed.
- FH and HA Curtiss, Gems of Mysticism, Curtiss Philosophic Book Co., 6th Ed.
- FH and HA Curtiss, The Temple of Silence, Curtiss Philosophic Book Co., 3rd Ed, 1920.
- FH and HA Curtiss, The Divine Mother, Curtiss Philosophic Book Co., 1921
- FH and HA Curtiss, The Soundless Sound, Curtiss Book Co., 1st Ed.
- FH and HA Curtiss, The Mystic Life, Pilgrims Book Services, 1934
- FH and HA Curtiss, The Love of Rabiacca, Curtiss Philosophic Book Co., 1st Ed.
- FH and HA Curtiss, Potent Prayers, Willing Publishing Co., 3rd Ed.
- FH and HA Curtiss, Christian Mystic Hymnal, Curtiss Philosophic Book Co., 1st Ed.
- Jeanette Agnes, The Seventh Seal, John C. Winston Co, 1st Ed.
- Princess Mary Karadja, Towards the Light, Dodd, Mead and Co., 1st Ed.

== Sources ==
- Social Science Volume 8, P Gamma Mu, 1933
- Order of the 15, The New York Times, December 23, 1908
- The Esoteric Quarterly, Summer 2017, Volume 13, Number 1
- Priestess of The Flame, Mount Linden Publishing, 2014 Ed.
- Aquarian Evangelist, The Age of Aquarius as It Dawned In the Mind of Levi Dowling, John Benedict Buescher, p76, 2nd Revised Ed, 2020
