= Kimberly Bailey =

American criminal (died 2008)

- Born: Fallbrook, California, US
- Disappeared: 1999; Mexico
- Status: found 2000
- Died: August 20, 2008 prison
- Other names: Kim Davis, Janet E. Flemming
- Organization(s): Royal Rife Research Society, AstroPulse/Astro pulse, Electromagic, InsiniTech/ Infinitech//Infini Tech, The Rife Society/Rife Society, Rife Instruments, ScalarTronix, Futuretronics, Quantronics, Electrospectrum/Electro Spectrum, The Cancer Cure that Worked, Naturetronics/NatureTronics, Nature Tech, The Last Seed
- Known for: selling alternative health devices and criminal activity
- Television: American Monsters: Abuse of Power (Season 1, Episode 2)
- Successor: James Folsom
- Status: guilty
- Criminal charges: kidnapping, torture, murder and conspiracy in murder-for-hire
- Penalty: life sentence plus 10 years
- Accomplices: James Folsom, John Krueger, Humberto Iribe

Details
- Victims: Richard C Post III
- Date: August 20, 1998
- Website: www.rrrs.org (inactive)

Kimberly Bailey of Fallbrook, California created her own version of a bio-frequency device, first invented by Royal Rife, and sold them as an alternative health treatment similar to radionics, purporting to cure a multitude of diseases. Although Bailey's holistic healing business made her millions, she is better known for being involved in kidnapping, torture, and murder-for-hire crimes.

== Alternative medicine ==
Bailey owned a 33-acre ranch north of San Diego where she grew holistic herbs. Bailey created a bio-active frequency device (also known as a "black box machine") because she thought she could improve on the original Rife design, and she wanted to protest against conventional medicine. Bailey claimed her device, which emitted electromagnetic waves, could cure various diseases in both humans and animals. She applied for a patent under the alias Janet E. Flemming. The product was sold through the mail and advertised on infomercials in the 1990s.

Bailey had several companies including: AstroPulse, The Last Seed, NatureTronics, Nature Tech, and BioSolutions, and used the aliases Kim Davis and Janet Flemming. The companies, which were under the umbrella company of the Royal Rife Research Society, are no longer in business since Bailey and her successor James Folsom were both imprisoned.

Bailey sold her device through her various companies despite it never being submitted for FDA approval. The fact that the device was not approved by the FDA was stated on page 10 of the AstroPulse Model D instruction manual. The manual also refers to the FBI as the "Federal Bureau of Interference" (page 50), solicits testimonials by offering prizes and to pay $250 for "interesting and dynamic progress reports" (page 52), and referral fees of $75-$300 (page 53).

Bailey became paranoid and convinced that someone at her company was stealing from her, so in 1997 she hired private investigator Richard Post to find the culprit. Bailey and Post became romantically involved briefly in 1998.

== Crimes ==
Bailey was investigated but never charged for fraud or selling unapproved medical devices, although her successor, James (Jim) Folsom was sentenced to 59 months in prison.

In 1998, John Krueger, an employee of Richard (Rick) Post who wanted to take over Post's business, lied to Bailey claiming that Post was the person who was stealing from her and he was also involved with other women. This led to Bailey meeting with Krueger and Humberto Iribe to devise a plan for revenge which entailed the kidnapping, torture and eventual murder of Richard Post.

Richard Post was last seen in San Diego on August 20, 1998. It is believed he was lured to Tijuana, Mexico by Bailey, which is where he was abducted by Iribe. According to statements made to authorities by Bailey, Krueger, and Iribe, Post was held captive and tortured for approximately five days before he was murdered. His body has never been recovered.

Subsequently, Bailey was involved in a conspiracy in a murder-for-hire plot to kill several people including Krueger, Iribe, and her gardener. The FBI had Bailey's home under surveillance when they discovered that Bruce Perlowin and his wife, former KGB agent and Russian spy Svetlana Ogorodnikova were staying at the property. Ogorodnikova, who had been convicted of espionage in 1985, was in America illegally. The FBI worked with Ogorodnikova to set up a sting operation to obtain evidence of Post's murder and Bailey's murder-for-hire plot.

In April 2000 Bailey was caught by Mexican authorities trying to leave the country using a fraudulent Canadian passport. She was extradited to USA where she faced trial in 2002. Krueger pleaded guilty and agreed to testify against Bailey. He was sentenced to 12 years in prison and 5 years parole. Bailey was convicted of kidnapping and conspiracy to kidnap, and was sentenced to life in prison plus ten years. The jury did not believe beyond a reasonable doubt that Post had been murdered. Iribe was sentenced to 25 years for his part in the crimes.

In 2008, while in prison, Bailey developed cancer and insisted that she have access to one of her devices for treatment. She died from her cancer because the treatment never worked.

Bailey's crimes have been covered on American Monsters: Abuse of Power and on various podcasts.
