= Alternating electric field therapy =

Type of electromagnetic field therapy

- Other names: Tumor treating fields
- Specialty: Oncology

Alternating electric field therapy, sometimes called tumor treating fields (TTFields), is a type of electromagnetic field therapy using low-intensity, intermediate frequency electrical fields to treat cancer. TTFields disrupt cell division by disrupting dipole alignment and inducing dielectrophoresis of critical molecules and organelles during mitosis. These anti-mitotic effects lead to cell death, slowing cancer growth. A TTField-treatment device manufactured by the Israeli company Novocure is approved in the United States and Europe for the treatment of newly diagnosed and recurrent glioblastoma, malignant pleural mesothelioma (MPM), and is undergoing clinical trials for several other tumor types. Despite earning regulatory approval, the efficacy of this technology remains controversial among medical experts.

== Mechanism ==
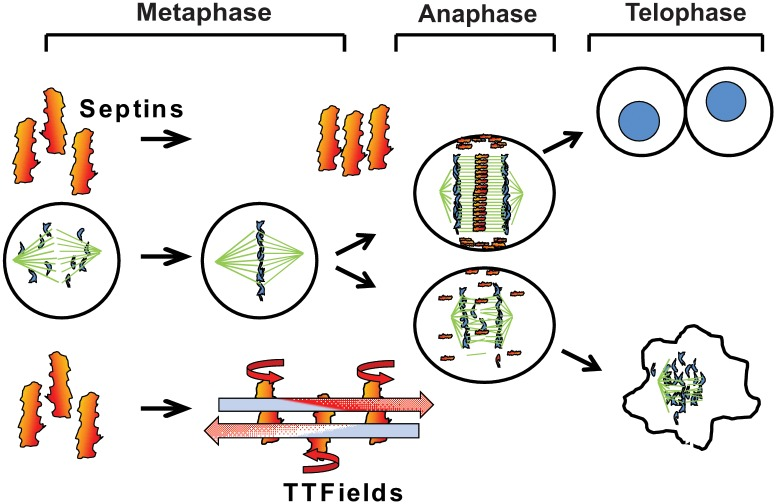
Dipole molecules, such as Septins, become unable to move as needed during mitosis when exposed to TTFields, resulting in cell death.

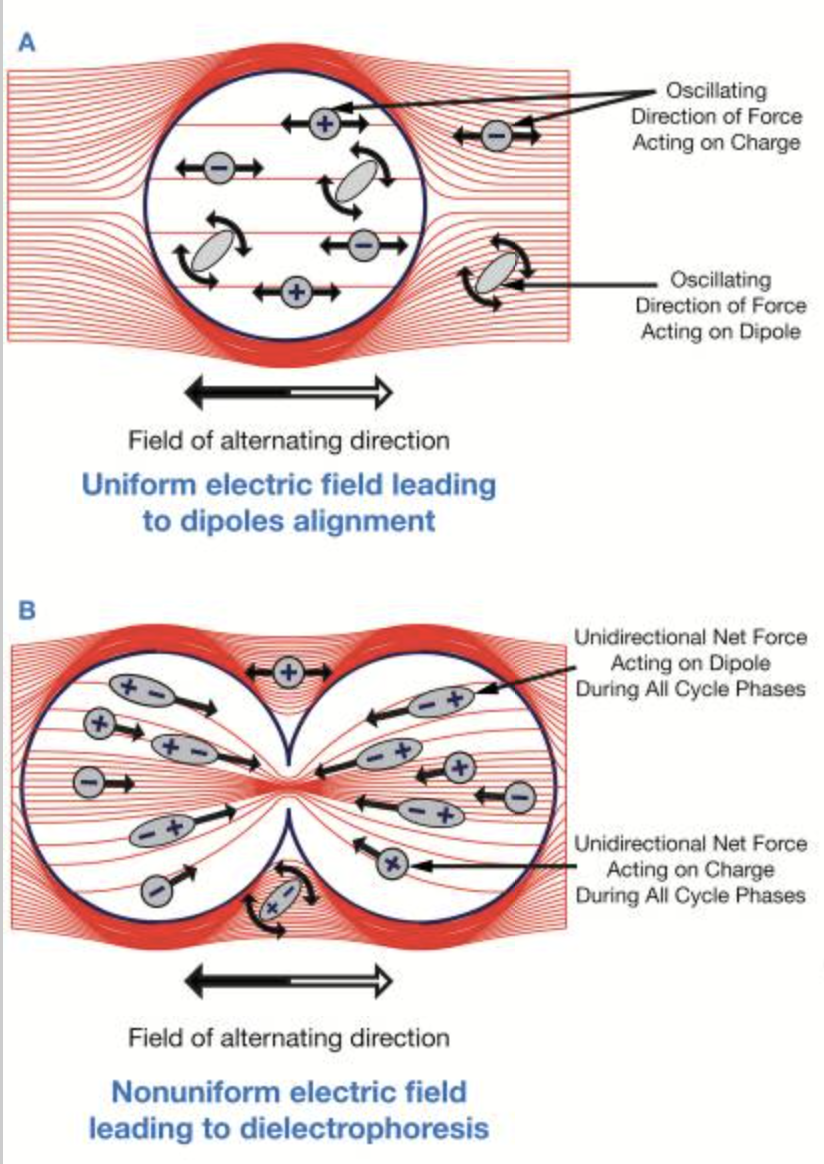
TTFields induce dielectrophoresis in mitotic cells

All living cells contain polar molecules and will respond to changes in electric fields. Alternating electric field therapy, or Tumor Treating Fields (TTFields) use insulated electrodes to apply very-low-intensity, intermediate-frequency alternating electrical fields to a target area containing cancerous cells. Polar molecules play a key role in cell division, making mitosis particularly susceptible to interference from outside electric fields. TTFields disrupt dipole alignment and induce dielectrophoresis during mitosis, killing proliferating cells.

=== Dipole alignment ===
Polar molecules critical to mitosis include α/β-tubulin and the mitotic septin heterotrimer. Tubulin is necessary for mitotic spindle formation during metaphase, while septins stabilize the cell during cytokinesis. When exposed to TTFields, these molecules align their dipole with the electric field, freezing them in one orientation. This prevents tubulin and septin molecules from moving to and binding where they are needed for successful cell division. This results in mitotic catastrophe, initiating cell death through apoptosis. Uneven chromosome splitting can also be a result of TTFields' effect on dipole alignment, resulting in daughter cells with abnormal chromosome numbers.

=== Dielectrophoresis ===
Cells that successfully complete metaphase are later susceptible to TTFields during telophase. At this stage in cell division, the cell takes on an hourglass shape as it prepares to divide in two. This results in a non-uniform electric field within the cell, with high field density at the cell's furrow. This causes polar molecules and organelles to migrate with the electric field toward the furrow. This disrupts the cell's division and leads to cell death.

=== Optimization ===
In principle, this approach could be selective for cancer cells in regions of the body, such as the brain, where the majority of normal cells are non-proliferating. The frequency of the TTField can be adjusted between 100 and 300kHz to target cancer cells and avoid harming healthy cells. Current research supports that cell size is inversely proportional to optimal TTField frequency. TTFields can also be optimized by orienting two transducer arrays perpendicular to each other to maximize the amount of cells that will be affected. Cells divide in different orientations and are most affected by an electric field that is parallel to their direction of division (perpendicular to the mitotic plate). Clinicians determine where to place the transducer arrays to optimize treatment using software that analyzes tumor location and the patient's morphometry.

=== Other biological effects ===
Emerging evidence suggests that alternating electric field therapy disrupts various biological processes, including DNA repair, cell permeability and immunological responses, to elicit therapeutic effects. Greater mechanistic understanding of TTFields may pave the way for new, more effective TTFields-based therapeutic combinations in the future.

== Medical uses ==
=== Recurrent glioblastoma ===
The American National Comprehensive Cancer Network's official guidelines list TTFields as an option for the treatment of recurrent glioblastoma, but note substantial disagreement among the members of the expert panel making this recommendation. High-quality evidence for the efficacy of TTFields in oncology is limited. The first randomized clinical trial evaluating TTFields was published in November, 2014, and evaluated efficacy of this approach in patients with recurrent glioblastoma. This trial was the primary basis for regulatory approval of NovoTTF-100A / Optune in the United States and Europe. In this study, patients with glioblastoma that had recurred after initial conventional therapy were randomized to treatment either with a TTFields device (NovoTTF-100A / Optune) or with their treating physician's choice of standard chemotherapy. Survival or response rate in this trial was approximately 6 months, and was not significantly better in the TTFields group than in the conventional therapy group. The results suggested that TTFields and standard chemotherapy might be equally beneficial to patients in this setting, but with different side-effect profiles. Two earlier clinical studies had suggested a benefit of TTFields treatment in recurrent glioblastoma, but definitive conclusions could not be drawn due to their lack of randomized control-groups.

=== Newly diagnosed glioblastoma ===
Initial results of a Novocure-sponsored, phase-3, randomized clinical trial of TTFields in patients with newly diagnosed glioblastoma were reported in November, 2014, and published in December 2015. Interim analysis showed a statistically significant benefit in median survival for patients treated with TTFields plus conventional therapy (temozolomide, radiation, and surgery) versus patients treated with conventional therapy alone, a result which led the trial's independent data monitoring committee to recommend early study-termination. This was the first large-scale trial in a decade to show a survival benefit for patients with newly diagnosed glioblastoma. On the basis of these results, the FDA approved a modification of the trial protocol, allowing all patients on the trial to be offered TTFields. Potential methodological concerns in this trial included the lack of a "sham" control group, raising the possibility of a placebo effect, and the fact that patients receiving TTFields received more cycles of chemotherapy than control patients. This discrepancy might have been a result of improved health and survival in TTFields-treated patients, allowing for more cycles of chemotherapy, but also could have been due to conscious or unconscious bias on the part of clinical investigators. An expert clinical review called the preliminary results "encouraging".

== Medical device ==
A clinical TTFields device is manufactured by Novocure under the trade name Optune (formerly NovoTTF-100A), and is approved in the United States, Japan, Israel and multiple countries in Europe for the treatment of recurrent glioblastoma. These devices generate electromagnetic waves between 100 and 300 kHz. The devices can be used in conjunction with regular patterns of care for patients, but are only available in certain treatment centers, and require specific training and certification on the part of the prescribing physician. When a TTFields device is used, electrodes resembling a kind of "electric hat" are placed onto a patient's shaved scalp. When not in use, the device's batteries are plugged into a power outlet to be re-charged.

=== Side effects ===
The adverse effects of TTFields include local skin rashes and irritation caused by prolonged electrode use. Compared with other cancer treatment methods, this effect is very minimal and tolerable for the patient. This irritation can be controlled with steroid creams and periodic breaks from treatment.

== Regulatory approval ==
The NovoTTF-100A / Optune device was approved by the U.S. Food and Drug Administration (FDA) in April 2011 for the treatment of patients with recurrent glioblastoma, based on clinical trial evidence suggesting a benefit in this population. Because the evidence for therapeutic efficacy was not deemed conclusive, the device manufacturer was required to conduct additional clinical trials as a condition of device approval. Critics suggested that pleas of cancer patients in the room of the FDA hearing swayed the opinions of many during the related FDA panel, and that approval was granted despite "huge misgivings on several points".

Optune was approved by the FDA for newly diagnosed glioblastoma on Oct. 5, 2015, as a result of randomized phase 3 trial results that reported a 3-month advantage in overall survival and progression-free survival when added to chemotherapy with temozolomide. In the US, Medicare covers treatment, as of February 2020.

== Company ==
Novocure Ltd. (Nasdaq: NVCR) was founded in 2000. As of December 2020, Novocure Ltd. has over 1000 employees and makes hundreds of millions of dollars in annual sales. Israeli Professor Yoram Palti, professor of physiology and biophysics at the Israel Institute of Technology, is the company's founder and chief technology officer. Novocure Ltd. owns 145 patents.

== See also ==
- Angiogenesis inhibitors
- Experimental cancer treatment
- Pulsed electromagnetic field therapy
