= Physical therapy in carpal tunnel syndrome =

Physical Therapy/Occupational Therapy in carpal tunnel syndrome
- Specialty: Occupational/physical therapy

This article is about physical therapy in carpal tunnel syndrome.

Physical therapists and occupational therapists are involved in the assessment and intervention process with clients with carpal tunnel syndrome (CTS). Physical and occupational therapy professionals provide education, symptom management (such as splinting, physical agent modalities, and manual therapy), and recommendations for modifying tasks, equipment, and the environment to prevent or reduce further complications. Multiple evidence-based reviews and practice guidelines have been published to provide therapy providers and the public with information as to when and how conservative care for CTS by a physical or occupational therapist is appropriate.

== Assessment ==
Tinel's sign and Phalen's tests can be used to assess for CTS. They may be administered by the physical therapist (PT) or occupational therapist (OT). Tinel's sign involves tapping at the volar wrist while Phalen's test involves maintaining maximum wrist flexion for 60 seconds. In both tests, a positive sign is indicated by numbness, tingling or pain in the thumb, index and half of the middle finger. The presence of positive Tinel's sign, Phalen sign, Flick sign, or Upper limb neural tension test independently have weak evidence for diagnosing CTS. However, when these provocative tests are combined, they are far more reliable for diagnosing this condition. Following positive signs, the PT or OT may perform manual muscle testing for grip and pinch strength and assess range of motion. Along with all these outcome measure we can use numeric pain rating scale (NPRS) and Boston Carpal Tunnel Syndrome Questionnaire (BCTQ), which consists of two further scales (the symptom severity scale (SSS) and the functional status scale (FSS)).

The clinician may perform a detailed step-by-step breakdown of what's involved in the activity to look at the specific tasks that could be affected by or be contributing to CTS symptoms. For example, the PT or OT may analyze the activity of cooking. They may find, for example, that repetitive lifting of heavy skillets is a contributing factor to the individual's CTS symptoms. They may also observe the environment in which the activity is being performed and identify risk factors and compensatory strategies.

== Intervention ==
Although surgical intervention for CTS by releasing the flexor retinaculum to alleviate median nerve compression is often effective, surgery is primarily recommended to relieve severe or long-term, chronic symptoms. Even with surgery, research has suggested that pain still exists in up to 38% of patients who receive surgery. Research also suggests that patients who focus on manual therapy of the neck, and median nerve combined with stretching have similar outcomes to that of surgery, but with much more progress within the one month mark then post-surgical patients.

PTs and OTs provide a wide range of non-surgical treatments to prevent or reduce symptoms of CTS and support recovery following surgical treatment, which primarily fall within the categories of wrist positioning (also known as splinting), patient education, manual therapy, sensory reeducation, exercises, thermal treatments, workplace alterations, and corticosteroids. A Corticosteroid injection can be used at the Carpal Tunnel Site to reduce inflammation of the synovial tissue. Although Corticosteroids can be beneficial, they shouldn't be used as a long term alternative because they can be harmful if used frequently. These interventions focus on the person's physical abilities, environment, and activities, emphasizing enabling function in self-care activities, leisure, and paid or unpaid work. At the level of the person, therapists can provide education and/or direct intervention for physical symptom treatment and management. At the levels of environment and occupation, PTs and OTs provide education and modifications related to the method of task completion, including equipment and tools used, and the setting in which it is being performed.

PTs and OTs who provide intervention for individuals with CTS often complete residency or fellowship experiences within the specialty area and may also be certified hand therapists (CHT). To become a CHT, an individual must be a physical or occupational therapist with at least 5 years experience, including 2000 hours of therapy pertaining directly to hands, and a certification exam is required.

Ultimately, surgery may be necessary if a patient's condition is severe and they are in danger of complications such as muscle atrophy, irreversible median nerve damage, or severe limited use of the hand. If this is the case, the flexor retinaculum is removed in order to relieve the pressure on the median nerve.

=== Education ===
Effective education is critical for preventing and reducing symptoms associated with CTS. Educational materials are widely available and accessible to patients, but publicly available educational materials are typically poor in quality and include misleading information. PTs and OTs are the primary healthcare professionals who can provide effective and accurate education related to the prevention and treatment of CTS to individual clients or groups of people.

Individuals with CTS or at risk for CTS may benefit from education in the areas outlined below:

- signs & symptoms of CTS
- options for treatment: surgical and/or non surgical interventions
- how to reduce risks & decrease symptoms of CTS
- splint wearing regimen
- body mechanics & exercises
- task adaptation
- adaptive tools
- workplace adaptations

=== Splinting ===
PTs and OTs often use wrist splinting as a form of treatment. Splints may be pre-fabricated or custom-fit. Prefabricated splints are sold in health care supply stores and are an inexpensive option for clients. Prefabricated splints may be used but the fit may not be precise enough for all individuals. In this case, a custom fit splint is required. A OT will fabricate a custom-fit splint by molding thermoplastic material unique to the client's hand, wrist and forearm.

Splints can be based on the front (palmar), back (dorsal) or outer side (pinky) of the arm. According to Muller et al.'s systematic review on interventions for CTS, volar cock-up splints and ulnar gutter splints are similar in their improvement of symptoms and function. Dorsal splints are also recommended for CTS as they reduce pressure placed on the volar wrist.

Splints aim to immobilize the wrist to decrease pressure in the carpal tunnel. Restricting wrist motion eliminates the repetitive movement and tension overload in the carpal tunnel. This gives the tendon sheaths a chance to heal, reducing swelling, which then may decrease the pressure on the median nerve.

Splints also aim to keep the wrist at a certain angle to decrease pressure within the carpal tunnel. Although there has been debate about the best angle for wrist immobilization, the authors of a systematic review on non surgical carpal tunnel treatments conclude that "there is limited evidence that the use of a wrist splint in neutral position is more effective than an extended wrist position of 20 degrees in patients with CTS in the short term."

In another systematic review on interventions for CTS, Muller et al. found that wearing a nocturnal splint as well as wearing a splint during aggravating activities alleviate symptoms of CTS (numbness, pain and tingling) better than no treatment. It follows that decreasing symptoms of CTS improves overall occupational function in activity. Splinting is also suggested in reversible cases of CTS such as pregnancy along with other conservative treatment options.

Based on scientific literature for the treatment of CTS, there is a recent review that concludes that surgical management is a better option along with therapy compared to splinting for CTS treatment. However, surgical treatment for CTS can be expensive compared to conservative treatment. The study also included that 61% of patients with symptoms of CTS preferred therapy instead of any surgical treatment. Based on the literature, there is no treatment that is better than others. Hence, there needs to be more research and investigation that needs to be done to back-up what treatment for CTS is a better option.

=== Other ===
An occupational or physiotherapist working as a hand therapist may be involved in other areas of treatment for the symptoms of CTS depending on their scope of practice. These treatments may include but are not limited to ultrasound, electromagnetic field therapy, magnetic therapy, low level-laser therapy, or nerve gliding exercises. Furthermore, there has been moderate evidence that Myofascial massage therapy, ESWT (extracorporeal shockwave therapy), interferential current, iontophoresis, and continuous shortwave diathermy can help improve function and pain in the short term and midterm. However, more evidence and investigation is needed to establish treatment parameters for these modalities. Manual therapy in CTS can vary from soft tissue mobilizations, bone mobilizations or manipulations, massage therapy, and neurodynamic techniques. CTS does not always have a clear cause, in which manual therapy can help by improving nerve gliding during movement of the wrist, fingers, or elbow and reducing tethering that can occur in the forearm. According to the recent research, ultrasound and carpal bone mobilization has limited evidence. The evidence for nerve gliding exercises/ neural mobilization is unclear but addition of those exercises in conservative treatment may accelerate functional recovery.

== Modification of occupation ==
Modification of a task is about adjusting behaviors and actions that may contribute to the development or exacerbation of CTS. As part of the assessment, the PT or OT will conduct an activity analysis to identify areas where change may be needed. Once a task is analyzed, alternative methods can be negotiated or discussed with the client. As Doheny et al. suggest, tasks can be redesigned to include diversity and thus limit repetitive movements that can aggravate CTS. For example, Keir et al. suggest breaking up the repetitive action of using a computer mouse with other tasks because mouse use was shown to increase carpal tunnel pressure. This study also suggests minimizing wrist extension through appropriate body posture at the workstation that may help to reduce carpal tunnel pressure.

A review of the literature has found evidence supporting the use of exercise and/or rest breaks in reducing musculoskeletal discomfort during computer work. Faucett et al. found that people with CTS were more likely to continue with their current jobs if modifications were made to the tasks. Two of these modifications included limiting repetitive tasks and decreasing work time. PT's and OT's can provide recommendations on job modifications to reduce risk factors by modifying client's work tasks.

=== Modification of equipment ===
A major role of the therapist is to introduce modified equipment and adaptive aids to enable occupational performance despite physical limitations. Modifying equipment and tools can correct positioning of the hand (e.g. keep it in a more neutral position) and reduce the hand force required to complete an action. For example, Dolby Laboratories introduced hand tools that reduced the hand force required, distributed the force over a larger surface area of the hand, and corrected the positioning of the hand through specially shaped handles that did not impinge on the median nerve area of the palm. These tools were designed to reduce risk factors associated with cumulative trauma disorders such as CTS. For example, specialized spring-loaded pliers reduced the force required to cut wire for electronic assembly purposes.

Adaptive aids can be useful in enabling individuals with CTS to participate in their chosen activities. One such adaptation is increasing the diameter of handles so that less grip strength is needed to grasp an object. Any handle can be built up in this way. For example, someone who has CTS may have difficulty holding their toothbrush or utensils while eating. Therapists can easily adapt these tools or purchase already adapted tools for a client. Specific risk factors that can contribute to CTS such as vibration can be reduced by introducing new tools with lower vibration levels as well as anti-vibration gloves.

=== Modification of environment ===
Another important avenue of therapy is adapting the environment to facilitate occupational performance of a particular task. When modifying an environment, often the equipment and tool adaptations are part of that environmental change.

In the management of CTS, workstation modification (i.e., adapting the work environment) is a large part of the intervention. By adjusting the workstation equipment, such as desks, chairs, monitors, and keyboards, the ideal position of the wrist and forearm can be achieved. This can help alleviate symptoms of CTS as well as prevent further damage and strain. For example, there is moderate evidence that a modified ergonomic keyboard is more effective than a regular keyboard at relieving symptoms of CTS. The addition of forearm supports can help to facilitate appropriate posture of the wrist by preventing extension while using a mouse.

Attention should also be given to psychosocial aspects of a work environment, such as job demands and job control, as they may help or hinder return to work and level of functioning within the workplace for those individuals with CTS.

Similar to the work environment, therapists can help adapt the home environment through the introduction of adaptive aids and adjustment of furniture or equipment.

The interventions for CTS mentioned above can be used together as illustrated in a study by Bash and Farber. These authors found that many hand therapists with symptoms of CTS not only wore splints but also engaged in modifying their tasks, tools and environments as part of their own intervention plan. Hand therapists are an example of a population that has been found to have high instances of CTS due to repetitive, stressful movements on the job. The hand therapists in this study used the following intervention strategies and reported symptom relief:

- made ergonomic changes to the work station (modify environment)
- used adaptive scissors and shears (modify tools/equipment)
- reheated splint material to trim edges (modify task)
- changed hand position (modify task)
- used assistive equipment for scar massage (modify tools/equipment).
