= George de la Warr =

English engineer

George Walter de la Warr (19 August 1904 – 31 March 1969) was an English civil engineer and a pioneer in the field of radionics. In 1953, he resigned from his engineering position with Oxfordshire County Council to work within the discredited field of radionics. His devices were denounced by medical experts.

== Career ==
According to Langston Day's 1956 book New Worlds Beyond the Atom, written in collaboration with de la Warr, de la Warr passed the Associate Membership examination of the Institution of Mechanical Engineers by the age of 20 and three years later, passed the examination for the Institution of Civil Engineers. He then held various engineering positions before becoming chief engineering assistant for the Oxfordshire County Council, a position he held for 16 years.

De la Warr was influenced by the devices of Ruth B. Drown and Albert Abrams. De la Warr invented devices that he said could identify symptoms such as "toxins", "fracture", and "secretion imbalance". He also claimed to have invented a camera that could detect and cure diseases by remote control. In June 1960, he was sued in the High Court by Catherine Phillips, a disgruntled former customer who said that her health had been ruined by using the Delawarr Diagnostic Instrument. In particular, she said that the box could not possibly have the benefits that de la Warr claimed for it. De la Warr said that his device operated above the physical plane, and the box was only used as a focus for thought. After ten days of argument, the judge eventually found for de la Warr, but considered the box to be bogus.

He founded Delawarr Laboratories in Oxford where he did his research and built many radionic devices. Delawarr Laboratories closed in 1987. Most of the radionic artifacts have unknown whereabouts. However, the radionic camera was given to Marcel J. Vogel, Psychic Research Inc. in San Jose, California. Vogel and Dan Willis did extensive tests and trials with the camera. Vogel died in 1992. The whereabouts of the camera since then is unknown.

Leslie Weatherhead, who had known de la Warr, had supported his devices.

== Criticism ==
De la Warr's radionic devices have been criticized by health experts as quackery. De la Warr was also notable for making unproven claims such using a photograph of insecticide on his machine to kill pests in a field miles away.

== Patents ==
- French patent number 1,084,318 – "Perfectionnements à la recherche d'une radiation fondamentale"
- UK patent number 741,651 – "Therapeutic apparatus"
- UK patent number 761,976 – "Therapeutic apparatus"

== Publications ==
- Experiments Relating to Increases in Crop Yield by Radionic Stimulation (1955)
- New Worlds Beyond the Atom (1956; written by Langston Day in collaboration with de la Warr)
- Matter in the Making (1966; written by Langston Day in collaboration with de la Warr)
