= Psionics =

Science fiction theme of 1950s and 1960s

Captain Science reading an alien's brain

In American science fiction of the 1950s and 1960s, psionics was a proposed discipline that applied principles of engineering (especially electronics) to the study (and employment) of paranormal or psychic phenomena, such as extrasensory perception, telepathy and psychokinesis. The term is a blend word of psi (in the sense of "psychic phenomena") and the -onics from electronics. The word "psionics" began as, and always remained, a term of art within the science fiction community and—despite the promotional efforts of editor John W. Campbell, Jr.—it never achieved general currency, even among academic parapsychologists. In the years after the term was coined in 1951, it became increasingly evident that no scientific evidence supports the existence of "psionic" abilities.

== Etymology ==
In 1942, two authors—biologist Bertold Wiesner and psychologist Robert Thouless—had introduced the term "psi" (from ψ psi, 23rd letter of the Greek alphabet) to parapsychology in an article published in the British Journal of Psychology. (This Greek character was chosen as apropos since it is the initial letter of the Greek word ψυχή [psyche]—meaning "mind" or "soul".) The intent was that "psi" would represent the "unknown factor" in extrasensory perception and psychokinesis, experiences believed to be unexplained by any known physical or biological mechanisms. In a 1972 book, Thouless insisted that he and Wiesner had coined this usage of the term "psi" prior to its use in science fiction circles, explaining that their intent was to provide a more neutral term than "ESP" that would not suggest a pre-existing theory of mechanism.

The word "psionics" first appeared in print in a novella by science fiction writer Jack Williamson—The Greatest Invention—published in Astounding Science Fiction magazine in 1951. Williamson derived it from the "psion", a fictitious "unit of mental energy" described in the same story. (Only later was the term retroactively described in non-fiction articles in Astounding as a portmanteau of "psychic electronics", by editor John W. Campbell.) The new word was derived by analogy with the earlier term radionics. ("Radionics" combined radio with electronics and was itself devised in the 1940s to refer to the work of early 20th century physician and pseudoscientist Albert Abrams.) The same analogy was subsequently taken up in a number of science-fiction-themed neologisms, notably bionics (bio- + electronics; coined 1960) and cryonics (cryo- + electronics; coined 1967).

== History ==
=== Background ===
In the 1930s, three men were crucial to inciting John W. Campbell's early enthusiasm for a "new science of the mind" construed as "engineering [principles] applied to the mind". The first was mathematician and philosopher Norbert Wiener—known as the "father of cybernetics"—who had befriended Campbell when he was an undergraduate (1928–1931) at MIT. The second was parapsychologist Joseph Banks Rhine, whose parapsychology laboratory at Duke University was already famous for its investigations of "ESP" when Campbell was an undergraduate there (1932–1934). The third was a non-academic: Charles Fort, the author and paranormal popularizer whose 1932 book Wild Talents strongly encouraged credence in the testimony of people who had experienced telepathy and other "anomalous phenomena".

The idea that ordinary people only utilize a small fraction of the (potentially enormous) capabilities of the human brain had become a particular "pet idea" for Campbell by the time he first published his own science fiction writings as a college student. In a 1932 short story he asserted that "no man in all history ever used even half of the thinking part of his brain". He followed up on this notion in a note to another story published five years later:

The total capacity of the mind, even at present, is to all intents and purposes, infinite. Could the full equipment be hooked into a functioning unit, the resulting intelligence should be able to conquer a world without much difficulty.

In 1939, he wrote in an editorial in the magazine Unknown, which he edited:

Is it so strange a thing that this unknown mass [the human brain] should have some unguessed power by which to feel and see beyond, directly, meeting mind to mind in telepathy, sensing direct the truth of things by clairvoyance?

Along with Charles Fort, Campbell believed that there were already many individuals with latent "psi powers" among us unwittingly, and he took this belief a step further in considering development of such powers to be the "next step" in human evolution. Throughout his career, Campbell had sought grounds for a new "scientific psychology" and was instrumental in formulating the brainchild of one of his more imaginative science fiction writers—the "Dianetics" of L. Ron Hubbard. Campbell's enthusiasm for Dianetics—which later morphed into the Church of Scientology—was red hot in 1949 and 1950, but had considerably cooled by 1951, when he saw Hubbard for the last time.

=== The "psi-boom" ===
With Campbell's encouragement, or at his direction, "psionic" abilities began to appear frequently in magazine science fiction stories in the mid-1950s, providing characters with supernormal or supernatural abilities. The first example was Murray Leinster's novella The Psionic Mousetrap published in early 1955. Examples of psychic abilities in fiction, whether attributed to supernatural agencies or otherwise, predated the "psionics" vogue. But the editors of The Encyclopedia of Science Fiction describe and define a post-war "psi-boom" in genre science fiction—"which he [Campbell] engineered"—dating it from the mid-1950s to the early 1960s. They cite James Blish's Jack of Eagles (1952), Theodore Sturgeon's More Than Human (1953), Wilson Tucker's Wild Talent (1954) and Frank M. Robinson's The Power (1956) as examples. Alfred Bester's The Demolished Man (1953) is a pioneering example of a work depicting a society in which people with "psi" abilities are fully integrated. Since the "psi-boom" years coincided with the darkest and most paranoid period of the Cold War, it is natural that many examples of the utility of telepathy in espionage (for example those of Randall Garrett) would be produced. In terms of literary continuity, the editors of The Encyclopedia of Science Fiction point out that "All the psi powers, of course, used to be in the repertoire of powerful magicians, and most are featured in occult romances."

In 1956, Campbell began promoting a psionics device known as the Hieronymus machine. It faced skepticism from scientists who viewed it as pseudoscientific and even as an example of quackery.

Some of the wind was taken out of the sails of psionics in 1957 when Martin Gardner, in the updated edition of his book Fads and Fallacies in the Name of Science, wrote that the study of psionics is "even funnier than Dianetics or Ray Palmer's Shaver stories" and criticized the beliefs and assertions of Campbell as anti-scientific nonsense.

== See also ==
- Extrasensory perception
- List of psychic abilities
- Paranormal
- Psionics (role-playing games)
- Psychotronic harassment
- Psychotronics (parapsychology)
- Radionics
