= Royal Rife =

American inventor (1888–1971)

Royal Raymond Rife
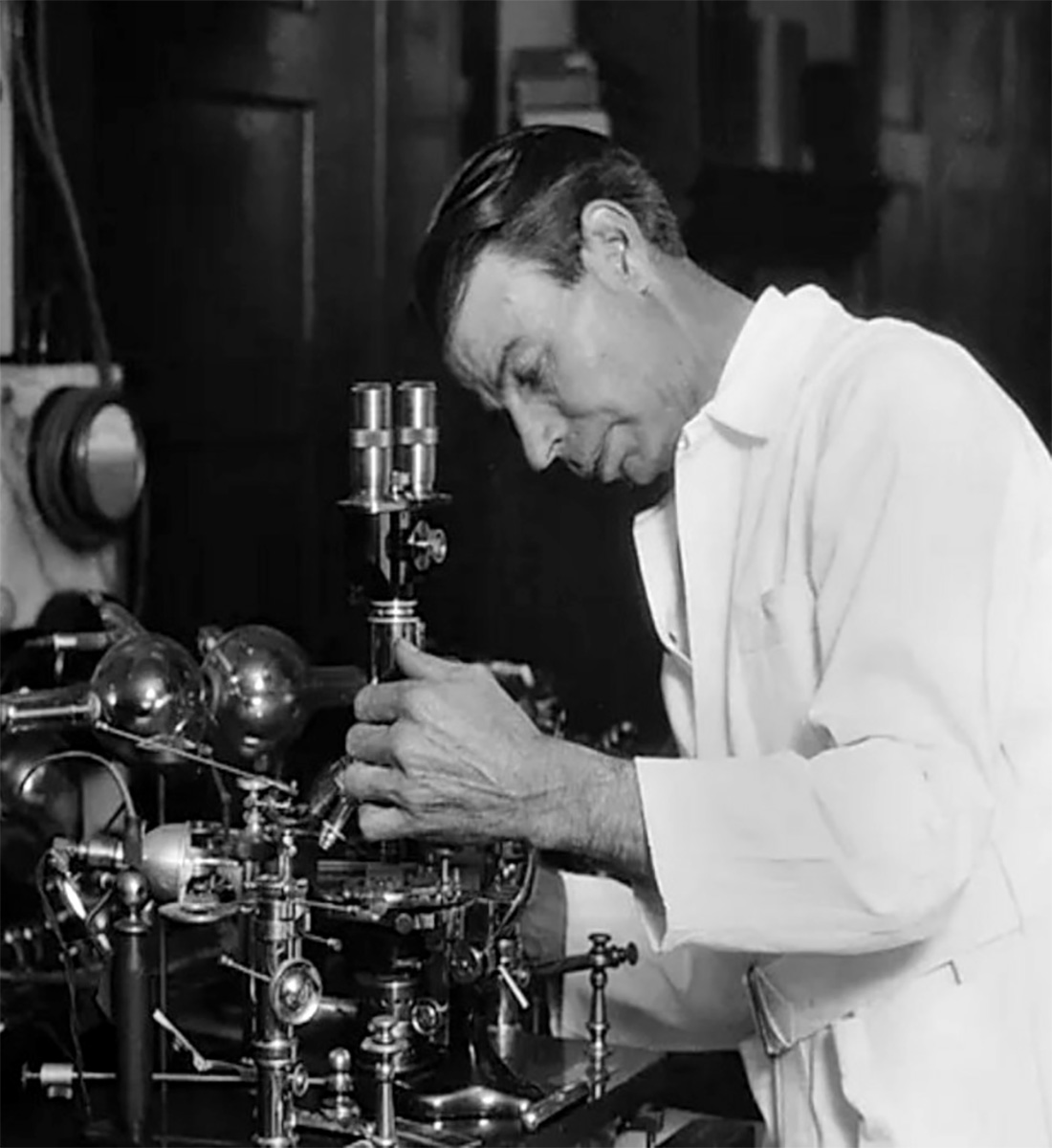
- Born: May 16, 1888; Elkhorn, Nebraska, U.S.
- Died: August 5, 1971 (aged 83); El Cajon, California U.S.
- Occupation: Inventor
- Known for: Microscopes and Rife’s device

Royal Raymond Rife (May 16, 1888 – August 5, 1971) was an American inventor and early exponent of high-magnification time-lapse cine-micrography.

Rife is known for his microscopes, which he claimed could observe live microorganisms with a magnification considered impossible for his time, and for an "oscillating beam ray" invention, which he thought could treat various ailments by "devitalizing disease organisms" using radio waves. Although he came to collaborate with scientists, doctors and inventors of the epoch, and his findings were published in newspapers and scientific journals like the Smithsonian Institution annual report of 1944, they were later rejected by the American Medical Association (AMA), the American Cancer Society (ACS) and mainstream science.

Rife's supporters continue to claim that impulses of electromagnetic frequencies can disable cancerous cells and other microorganisms responsible for diseases. Most of these claims have no scientific research to back them up, and Rife machines are not approved for treatment by any health regulator. Multiple promoters have been convicted of health fraud and sent to prison.

== Life and work ==
Royal Raymond Rife (age 43) in Popular Science Magazine (June 1931)

Little reliable published information exists describing Rife's life and work. In the 1930s, he made several optical compound microscopes and, using a movie camera, took time-lapse microscopy movies of microbes. He also built microscopes that included polarizers. Rife claimed magnifications of 17,000× or more for some of these microscopes.

A report published by the Smithsonian Institution described one of these microscopes as equipped for "transmitted and monochromatic beam dark-field, polarized, and slit-ultra illumination, including also a special device for crystallography". It added that several doctors had attended a demonstration of another of Rife's microscopes and had been impressed by its clarity and high magnification.

A distinctive feature of the microscopes, according to Rife and to other scientists who examined them, was a false-colour effect by which, when a microbe was illuminated by a particular wavelength of polarised monochromatic light, different for each type of microbe, the microbe and only the microbe would emit a distinctive colour of light (turquoise for typhoid bacteria, ruby red for Mycobacterium leprae, etc.), thus taking the place of staining and allowing otherwise difficult organisms to be plainly seen.

Some of the observations Rife claimed to have made with his microscopes are, however, contradicted by modern findings. For instance, he reported that under certain conditions typhoid bacteria changed into a much smaller form, and claimed that most cancerous tumours contained a microbe that had no less than five forms, one of which was indistinguishable from E. coli while another resembled a fungus.

Rife also reported that a 'beam ray' device of his invention could destroy microbial pathogens. Rife claimed to have documented a "Mortal Oscillatory Rate" for various pathogenic organisms, and to be able to destroy the organisms by vibrating them using radio waves of this particular frequency. According to the San Diego Evening Tribune in 1938, Rife stopped short of claiming that he could cure cancer, but did argue that he could "devitalize disease organisms" in living tissue, "with certain exceptions". In a 1931 profile, Rife warned against "medical fakers" who claim to cure disease using "electrical 'vibrations'", stating that his work did not uphold such claims.

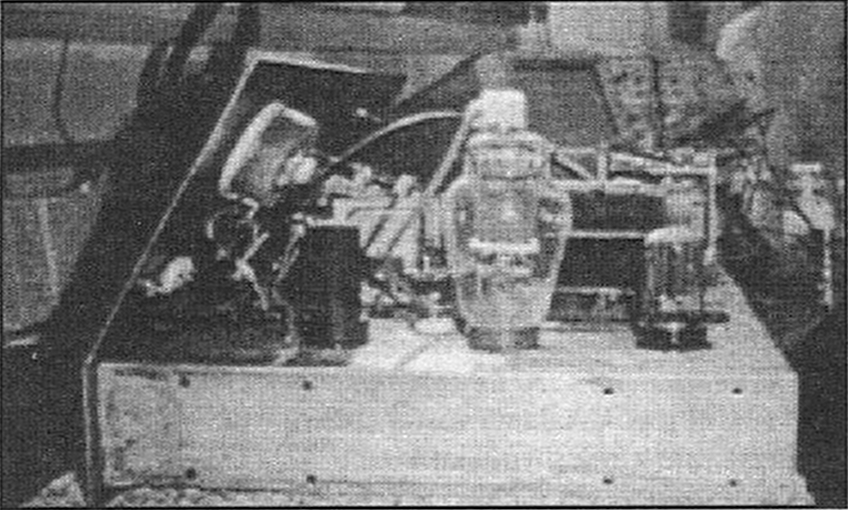
Rife machine (1922)

An obituary in the Daily Californian described his death at the age of 83 on August 5, 1971, stating that he died penniless and embittered by the failure of his devices to garner scientific acceptance. Rife blamed the scientific rejection of his claims on a conspiracy involving the American Medical Association (AMA), the Department of Public Health, and other elements of "organized medicine", which had "brainwashed and intimidated" his colleagues.

== Health fraud after his death ==
Interest in Rife's claims was revived in some alternative medical circles by the 1987 book by Barry Lynes, The Cancer Cure That Worked, which claimed that Rife had succeeded in curing cancer, but that his work was suppressed by a powerful conspiracy headed by the American Medical Association. The American Cancer Society (ACS) describes Lynes' claims as implausible, noting that the book was written "in a style typical of conspiratorial theorists", and that Lynes "... cites names, dates, events and places, giving the appearance of authenticity to a mixture of historical documents and speculations selectively spun into a web far too complex to permit verification by any thing short of an army of investigators with unlimited resources."

After this book's publication, a variety of devices bearing Rife's name were marketed as cures for diverse diseases such as cancer and AIDS. Some used radio waves as in the original experiments, some used other methods such as a pulsed electric current or pulsed electromagnetic fields at the correct frequencies, or what the manufacturers believed to be the correct frequencies. An analysis by Electronics Australia found that one typical 'Rife device' cost AU$105 for a rudimentary circuit that simply produced a tiny pulsed electrical current (at a single fixed frequency of about 40kHz). It consisted of a nine-volt battery, wiring, a switch, a standard 555 timer chip and two short lengths of copper tubing meant to act as handheld electrodes, delivering a current which the author estimated at 1 milliamp at most. Its design was, in fact, almost identical to the "zapper" device promoted by Hulda Clark, rather than having much in common with Rife's original devices. He described this as "the tip of an enormous iceberg", with a wide range of more elaborate devices also on sale from different suppliers, varying widely in design and ranging in price from AU$1,500 to AU$34,000.

Such 'Rife devices' have figured prominently in several cases of health fraud in the U.S., typically centered around the uselessness of the devices and the grandiose claims with which they are marketed. In a 1996 case, the marketers of a 'Rife device' claiming to cure numerous diseases including cancer and AIDS were convicted of felony health fraud. The sentencing judge described them as "target[ing] the most vulnerable people, including those suffering from terminal disease" and providing false hope. In some cases cancer patients who ceased chemotherapy and instead used these devices have died. A Washington State couple Donald and Sharon Brandt, who operated a clandestine health-care clinic from their home in Mount Vernon based on Rife's inventions were convicted for a short imprisonment period. Rife devices are currently classified as a subset of radionics devices, which are generally viewed as pseudomedicine by mainstream experts. In Australia, the use of Rife machines has been blamed for the deaths of cancer patients who might have been cured with conventional therapy. In 2002 John Bryon Krueger, who operated the Royal Rife Research Society, was sentenced to 12 years in prison for his role in a murder and also received a concurrent 30-month sentence for illegally selling Rife devices. In 2009 a U.S. court convicted James Folsom of 26 felony counts for sale of the Rife devices sold as 'NatureTronics', 'AstroPulse', 'BioSolutions', 'Energy Wellness', and 'Global Wellness'.

== Legacy ==
In 1994, the American Cancer Society's journal CA: A Cancer Journal for Clinicians criticized Rife's methods and devices in an article titled "Questionable Methods of Cancer Management: Electronic Devices". The ACS reported that Rife machines were being sold in a "pyramid-like, multilevel marketing scheme". A key component in the marketing of Rife devices has been the claim, initially put forward by Rife himself, that the devices were being suppressed by an establishment conspiracy against cancer "cures". Although 'Rife devices' are not registered by the U.S. Food and Drug Administration and have been linked to deaths among cancer sufferers, The Seattle Times reported that over 300 people attended the 2006 Rife International Health Conference in Seattle, where dozens of unregistered devices were sold.

Cancer Research UK, the world's largest independent cancer research charity, has stated:

"There is no reliable evidence that the Rife machine works as a cure for cancer.... There is also no evidence that it doesn't cause harm.... Many websites promote the Rife machine as a cure for cancer. But no reputable scientific cancer organisations support any of these claims."

A 2000 article in The Sydney Morning Herald warned:

"Cancer sufferers have died after putting their faith in a device with electrical parts worth just $15" (equivalent to $28 in 2025), further reporting that Rife machines are "unanimously condemned as worthless by mainstream scientists and banned in at least two American States."

== See also ==
- Albert Abrams – American doctor
- Electromagnetic therapy (alternative medicine) – Form of alternative medicine
- List of ineffective cancer treatments
- Medical applications of radio frequency – Medical applications of radiating waves
- Pulsed radiofrequency#Therapeutic uses – Radio technique
