= Hieronymus machine =

Several patented radionics devices

A Hieronymus machine is any of the patented radionics devices invented by electrical engineer Thomas Galen Hieronymus (21 November 1895 – 21 February 1988). Hieronymus received a U.S. patent for his invention in 1949, which was described in the patent application title as a device for "detection of emanations from materials and measurement of the volumes thereof".

Skeptics and scientists consider the devices to be an example of pseudoscience and quackery.

== History ==
=== Design and function ===
The original "Radiation Analyzer" consisted of a chamber to hold a sample of material, a glass prism to refract the "eloptic" emanations coming from it, and a copper wire probe on a rotating armature to adjust the angle formed by the prism and the probe. Supposedly, "eloptic" emanations are refracted by the prism at different angles depending on the material. The detected "eloptic" signals were fed to a three-stage vacuum tube RF amplifier and conducted to a flat touch plate surrounded by a copper wire bifilar coil. By stroking the touch plate an operator could supposedly feel a sensation of "tingling" or "stickiness" when the "eloptic" energy was detected. As such, a human nervous system is considered to be necessary to operate a Hieronymus Machine.

Hieronymus subsequently designed solid-state versions of his Analyzers, substituting germanium transistors for crystal prisms and tunable capacitors for the rotating armature. He also designed and built various specialized devices designed for specific functions, including analysis of living organisms and production of homeopathic remedies. The most well-known Hieronymus Machine is the Eloptic Medical Analyzer, which supposedly analyzes and transmits "eloptic energy" to diagnose and treat medical conditions in plants and animals.

The theory of operation on which Hieronymus Machines are based is that all matter emits a kind of "radiation" that is not electromagnetic, but exhibits some of the characteristics of both light and electricity. The quality of this emanation is unique to every kind of matter, and therefore can be utilized for detection and analysis. Hieronymus coined the term "eloptic energy" to describe this radiation (from the words "electrical" and "optical"). All of his machines were designed to detect and manipulate this "eloptic energy". Eloptic emanations have never been detected by instruments designed to measure electromagnetic energies, no other evidence of their existence have been produced, and there is no mathematical theory of an eloptic field, so the theory is considered pseudoscientific and is not accepted by the scientific community.

=== John W. Campbell and Hieronymus machines ===
The inventions of Hieronymus were championed by Astounding Science Fiction editor John W. Campbell in late 1950s and early 1960s editorials. A series of correspondences between the two men show that while Hieronymus was sure that someday his theories of eloptic energy would be proven and accepted by physical scientists, Campbell was convinced that the machines were based on psionics, related to the user's paranormal or ESP powers.

As an example, Campbell believed one could create an eloptic receiver or similar device with the prisms and amplifiers represented by their cardboard or even schematic representations. Through the use of mental powers, such a machine would function as well as its "real" equivalent. In his autobiography, Hieronymus wrote, "I appreciated Mr Campbell's interest in my work, but over the years since then, I have concluded that he set back the acceptance of my work at least a hundred years by his continual emphasis on what he termed the supernatural or 'magic' aspects of a mind-controlled device he built by drawing the schematic of my patented instrument with India ink. The energy flowed over the lines of this drawing because India ink is conducting, but it isn't worth a tinker's damn for serious research or actual treating."

== Scientific reception ==
The claims of Hieronymus about "eloptic" emanations were heavily criticized by the scientific community as having no basis in reality. His machines have been compared to the quack devices of Albert Abrams and have also been described as an example of pseudoscience.
