= Antoine Prioré =

Italian cancer researcher (1912–1983)

Antoine Prioré (or Priore) (April 10, 1912 – May 9, 1983) was an Italian electrical engineer, best known for inventing a controversial electromagnetic device that he claimed could cure cancer. While some medical experts have dismissed his claims as quackery, the results were sufficiently significant to be supported by other experts Like Prof. Raymond Pautrizel, Marcel Rivière, or even Nobel laureate in medicine André Michel Lwoff.

== Career ==
Prioré was born in Trieste, Italy. Prioré received training in electrical engineering and was a radar technician for the Italian Navy. (Perisse, 1984) He was a prisoner of the German Nazi occupation of Bordeaux, France, until he was rescued by Louis Durand police captain and member of the French Resistance in 1944. (Bird, 1984)

Priore worked for 25 years (between 1950 and 1975) in Bordeaux, and built a series of electromagnetic devices producing a strong magnetic field of 600 gauss (60 mT) or more for the purpose of treating cancer and disease.

His last device was funded by the French government with the help of one-time Prime Minister of France Jacques Chaban-Delmas. Prioré also built a large device (M-600) for the purpose of treating people with cancer. Prioré reported to have treated a number of animals with cancer with his device, but it broke down before it could be applied to human patients. Prioré claimed to have cured a number of terminal cancer patients with his earlier devices. (Bird, 1984) Prioré's research attracted the attention of the French media in 1965 who dubbed it "L'affaire Priore".

In 1965, one event exposed possible foul play in Prioré's experimental research involving "English mice." Mice with experimental cancers sent to Prioré from the Chester Beatty Institute in England led to controversy over his research. After Prioré exposed the mice to radiation from his devices, they were sent back to the institute. Scientists from the Institute claimed the mice returned to them were not genuine because they rejected new cancer grafts. One scientist with the institute, Pierette Chateaurenaud-Duprat, retorted the claim stating the mice showed signs of immunity to the cancers they were originally grafted with. Prioré's colleagues supported his research until his death in 1983. Immunologist Raymond Pautrizel and Robert Courier, former secretary of the French Academy of Sciences, published a series of notes on Prioré's research in the proceedings of the French Academy. Pautrizel, an apologist, classified Prioré's methodology as immunological in nature, since animals inoculated with deadly doses of parasites were reportedly healed with Prioré radiation. According to Bird (1984), a supporter, Priore's methodology was also characterized by boosting subjects' immune systems, allowing them to heal themselves of incurable diseases.

Antoine Prioré died on May 9, 1983, of a stroke. (Perisse, 1984) Jean-Michel Graille, a French journalist, met with Raymond Pautrizel and wrote a book on the Priore affair, Dossier Priore.

== Critical reception ==
Prioré was accused of manipulating his scientific data by prominent members of the French Academy of Sciences. French journalists also accused Prioré of not understanding his own technique for treating cancer and disease. Prioré never exposed his exact method, believing others would only steal it for themselves. Members of the French Academy of Sciences and media alike seriously questioned the legitimacy of Prioré's research, with many accusing him of fraud.

The U.S. Office of Naval Research evaluated Prioré's patents. The patents seemed deliberately made unclear, leaving little information to ascertain the mechanical and electromagnetic workings of Prioré's devices. Physicist Pierre Aigrain, the head of the General Delegation for Scientific and Technical Research (DGRST) has written that "the biological effects resulting from the radiation emitted by M Priore's apparatus have no connection with cancer... to speak of a therapeutic apparatus capable of helping the sick is pure romancing."

Prioré's education has also been called into question. For example, Solly Zuckerman has described Prioré as a "self-taught electrical technician."

== See also ==
- Bioelectromagnetics
- Electromagnetic therapy
- Radionics

== References and further reading ==
- Bateman, J. B. (1978) A Biologically Active Combination of Modulated Magnetic and Microwave Fields: The Prioré Machine. Office of Naval Research, London, Report R-5-78, Aug. 16, 1978.
- Bird, Christopher. The Case of Antoine Prioré and His Therapeutic Machine: A Scandal in the Politics of Science. 1984.1988 USPA and Cheniere
- Graille, Jean-Michel (1984). Dossier Priore. Denoël.
- Perisse, Eric. Effects of Electromagnetic Waves and Magnetic Fields on Cancer and Experimental Trypanosomiasis. March 16, 1984. University of Bordeaux.
- Valone, Thomas Bioelectromagnetic Healing: A Rationale for its Use. Integrity Research Inst., 2000. ISBN 0-9641070-5-8
- Bearden, Tom U.S. Office of Naval Research Report on the Priore Machine 16 August 1978.
