= Ruth B. Drown =

American alternative medicine practitioner (1891–1965)

Ruth Beymer Drown
- Born: October 21, 1891; Colorado
- Died: March 13, 1965 (aged 73)
- Occupation: Chiropractor
- Years active: 1922–1964
- Known for: Medical fraud with electrical devices
- Children: Cynthia Chatfield, Homer F. Drown

Ruth Beymer Drown (October 21, 1891 – March 13, 1965) born in Colorado was an American alternative medicine practitioner, chiropractor and proponent of radionics. She invented radio devices which she claimed could cure any patient in the world, just from blood-sampling. Drown was investigated by the California State Bureau of Food and Drug Inspection and charged with grand theft in 1963. Investigators claim her radiotherapy used worthless electrical devices to treat non-existent ailments. Drown died before the case came to trial.

== Early life and education ==
Born in Colorado in 1891, Drown moved to California in 1918 and lived in Hollywood, California.

== Career ==
Drown worked in the electrical assembly department of Southern California Edison Company and made her first radionic machine in 1929. Drown began practicing as a chiropractor in 1922. She was influenced by the devices of Albert Abrams. She was a licensed osteopath and a member of the American Naturopathic Association.

She invented radio devices which she claimed could cure any patient in the world, just from blood-sampling. According to Drown, the Drown Radio Therapy and Drown Radio Vision instruments (also called Homo-Vibra Ray instruments) tuned in to the vibrations of the body, and could locate and identify not only disease, but gauge blood pressure, examine urine, and sample the temperature of the patient. When independently tested her devices and technique were proved ineffective, as she was unable to diagnose any illnesses accurately from provided blood samples of patients.

At the clinic some patients sat on a table putting their feet on footpads made of German silver. The console had a "stick pad" and a quantity of dials which Drown adjusted after placing an electrode on the body of the patient, usually the stomach. When Drown's finger on the pad began to "stick" or "squeak" while turning the dials, then it meant that the "dial settings were beginning to approach the vibration rate of the part or organ of the body that she was supposedly testing". Drowns would then take out glass vials holding a chemical and insert unopened into the well of the desk and continue adjusting the dials. When she determined that she had matched the numbers to the vibrations of the patient she would read off the dial numbers to her assistant who would consult the "rate book" which would give the "normal" vibration rate which was then "fed back into the body to restore health".

Another machine dubbed by the police "the Tunnel of Love" had patients lie down on a slab and inserted into a hollow coil, Drown said that this would "straighten up people who walked lopsided". If a patient did not want to purchase one of the Drown machines for home use, they could call up the clinic who had kept their blood sample on a blotting paper and insert that into the machine, the "blood sample supposedly remained in some kind of continuous communication with the rest of the patient's blood, where he might be, and thus reflected any current illness" Or for a monthly fee of $35 the blood sample would be inserted into the machine on a specified day, then dials would be set to the healing rate and for an hour it would communicate with the patient's blood anywhere in the world. Drown claimed she could take photos of diseased organs using "radio-vision". At the 1966 trial, medical experts examined these photos, one calling it "completely unintelligible".

Drown also claimed that jazz music caused cancer and could be combatted by playing soothing tunes. In one of her books Drown Atlas of Radio Therapy she claimed that patients should not stand over a drain when taking a shower because the patient's magnetism would be washed by the water into the drain and leave the patient "depleted". When taking a bath, someone else should drain the tub water, or the patient should put on a robe and drain the water outside the tub to keep from washing the patient's magnetism out with the water.

In 1949 the Drown devices were tested at the University of Chicago. In one of the tests, Drown said the patient was suffering from cancer of the breast, blind in one eye and her ovaries were not functioning, the patient was actually suffering from tuberculosis. Science writer Martin Gardner noted that "Drown was given blood specimens from ten patients. Her diagnoses of the first three were so erroneous that she did not even attempt the remaining seven." In one test, Drown attempted to use radio waves to stop an anesthetized laboratory animal from bleeding, she failed. The committee stated that the devices were quackery and concluded "her alleged successes rest solely on the noncritical attitude of her followers. Her technic is to find so much trouble in so many organs that usually she can say 'I told you so' when she registers an occasional lucky guess. In these particular tests, even this luck deserted her".

When actor Tyrone Power and his wife were in an auto accident in Italy in the early 1950s, Drown attempted to heal them using short-wave therapy (using a device called "Model 300") with a sample of their blood she claimed to have in her library saved on blotting paper. When they returned to America she sent them a bill.

== Investigation ==
On May 23, 1963, Jackie Metcalf and State Food and Drug Inspector Concetta Jorgensen acted as undercover investigators by taking blood samples to the Drown office on La Brea in Hollywood for analysis. They were charged $50 per diagnosis and were told that the process could treat any patient from anywhere in the world by "tuning in ... with radio waves from the black boxes". Metcalf took three samples on blotting paper claiming that they were from her children. Three days later she "received a diagnosis of chicken pox for all three children and mumps in one as well. the blood samples were actually from a sheep, a turkey and a pig". Metcalf told the staff at the clinic that she (Metcalf) had stomach problems, she was diagnosed "as aluminum poisoning of the stomach and gall bladder. She was advised to throw away all her aluminum kitchen utensils and come back for further treatment". Metcalf purchased a Drown Therapeutic Instrument for $588 so she could treat her family at home, Chatfield instructed her how to set the dials to cure the children.

The clinic at the time of their arrest had treated over 35,000 people and sold the machines to practitioners around the country. "The devices allegedly could diagnose and cure nearly every known affliction from jealousy to cancer, plus a few ailments which medical science had yet to discover".

== Arrests and trials ==
In 1951, Drown was tried on federal charges "of introducing a misbranded device into interstate commerce". An expert witness, Dr. Elmer Belt called the device "perfectly useless ... I couldn't even use it to amuse the children". Drown was fined $1,000 and stopped shipping her devices out of California, "but otherwise continued on business as usual".

Under investigation since April 1963 by investigators from the state food and drug organization, police arrested the two chiropractors, Ruth B. Drown and her daughter Cynthia Chatfield as well as four employees on at the Drown Laboratory offices at 1358 N. La Brea Ave, October 9, 1963. Margaret Lunness and the chiropractors were charged with one count of grand theft and two counts of attempted grand theft. Margaretha Bice, Myrna Ayres and Opal Gamst were charged with two counts of attempted grand theft. In January 1964 the three employees Bice, Ayres and Gamst had their charges dismissed. Drown, Chatfield and Lunness were ordered to appear for trial.

Drown claimed that the police had committed a crime against her by illegally searching and taking her devices, she sought return of six "remote control diagnostic and treatment devices". In November 1963, "the search warrant used in the raid was quashed by a Superior Court judge ... but the jurist refused to return ... machines".

The trial was scheduled for March 23, 1964 in Superior Court. Drown died March 13, 1965.

During the 1966 trial, many of Drown's patients testified, one man was told to reduce the intake of insulin for his son who was diabetic. An epileptic man was told to stop taking his medication prescribed by his doctor. A chiropractor who using one of the Drown machines brought a man for testing which found no cancer in the patient who later died, during a biopsy it was shown that the patient had malignant cancer. Later in the trial, professor of radiology at UCLA School of Medicine, Dr. Moses Greenfield, disassembled a device in open court and explained all it "consisted of was a length of wire linking together two pieces of dissimilar metal ... the function performed by the patient was to complete the otherwise broken circuit ... a small electric current flowed between the two metals .... operating like a simple flashlight". The dials on the machine were found to connected together so it made no difference where the dials were set.

Deputy district attorney John Miner said in his summary to the judge at the completion of the 1966 trial "Quackery can kill, and the use of fraudulent instruments such as these devices in the courtroom is dangerous to human life".

In November 1966 Margaret Lunness and Cynthia Chatfield were convicted of attempted grand theft and grand theft. In March 1967, Lunness was put on probation, and her conviction of attempted grand theft was reduced to a misdemeanor. Chatfield served prison time.

The judge when finding the clinic guilty stated "that the theory of the treatment is no more valid than 'voodoo or witchcraft'".

== Personal life ==
Drown's funeral was held at the Little Church of the Flowers and buried at Forest Lawn in Glendale, California.

== Publications ==
- The Science and Philosophy of the Drown Radio Therapy (1938)
- The Theory and Technique of the Drown Radio Therapy and Radio Vision Instruments (1939)
- Wisdom From Atlantis (1946)

== See also ==
- Fred J. Hart
- Elizabeth Holmes
