= Electropoise =

19th-century medical fraud

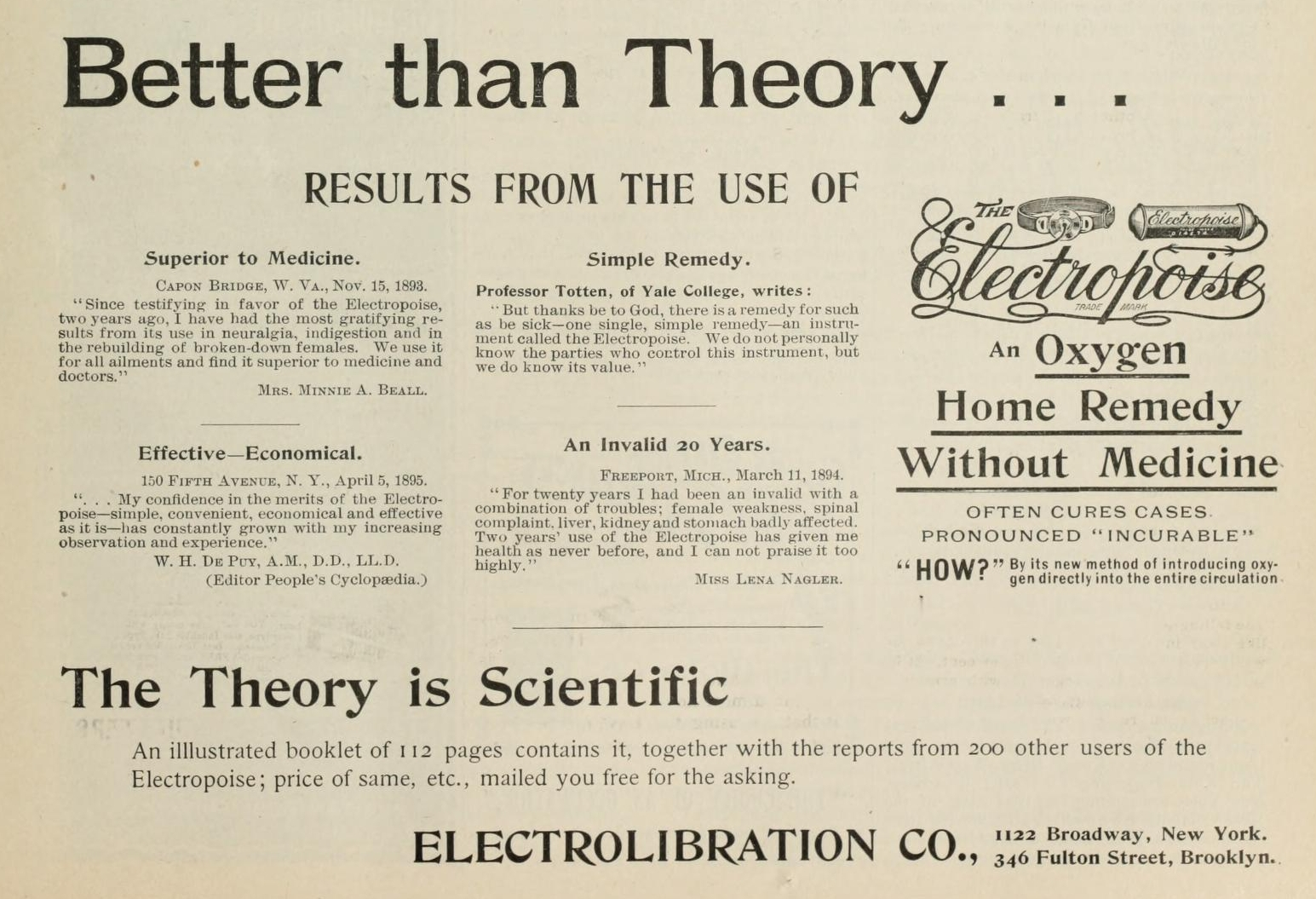
1895 advertisement

The Electropoise was a fake medical instrument patented and sold in the United States of America by Hercules Sanche, who also invented and sold other fake instruments which were later termed as "electroquackery" and included such devices as the "Oxydonor" which were claimed to remedy a range of ailments.

== History ==
The instruments were widely advertised in popular magazines and the company, Electrolibration, opened numerous offices far from their headquarters in Birmingham, Alabama including New York and London. The President of Electropoise, John N. Webb, admitting that he was not a man of science stated that his hands were full handling the business. It was sold for about twenty-five dollars. Other successors like Oxydonor were sold at ten to thirty dollars. Even during its heyday, a period when electricity was viewed with awe, some physicians called attention to the nature of the fraud but their efforts had little impact on the advertisement and sale. A letter to the editor of the Journal of the American Medical Association in 1897 by a physician named George N. Kreider states that "One of the most glaring frauds of this decade has been an appliance known as 'Electropoise,' advertised in Harper's Monthly and other leading publications" and promoted by a W.H. De Puy, editor of the New York Christian Advocate.

N.C. Morse, a physician, tried investigating the instrument and wrote: "I have had it sawed into sections and alas, like the goose that laid the golden egg of fable fame, there is nothing in the carcass!" Another physician named Harding wrote in 1930 that the pricing of such devices helped in selling the remedy which may have had a placebo effect. The advertisement was clever in claiming that it enhanced the body's natural healing ability. The Electropoise, it claimed:

... is a thermal instrument with an electrical force simulating the nervous current, and evidently acting through trophic nerves. When the polarizer is placed in cold water or upon ice, and the plate attached to wrist or ankle or over other parts of the body as may be required, the warmth of the body upon the plate at once brings this thermal influence into action. The effects are a generally distributed and accelerated circulation, with stimulated nutritive function in every tissue. The respiration deepened and more oxygen absorbed. The secretions of stomach, liver, and all the digestive organs are increased...

Elsewhere it claimed:

...a little instrument which enables the system to take on oxygen freely from the atmosphere. This addition of nature's own tonic increases vitality, tones up the nervous system, purifies the blood, and by expelling the morbid matter and diseased tissues restores the body to its normal condition - health

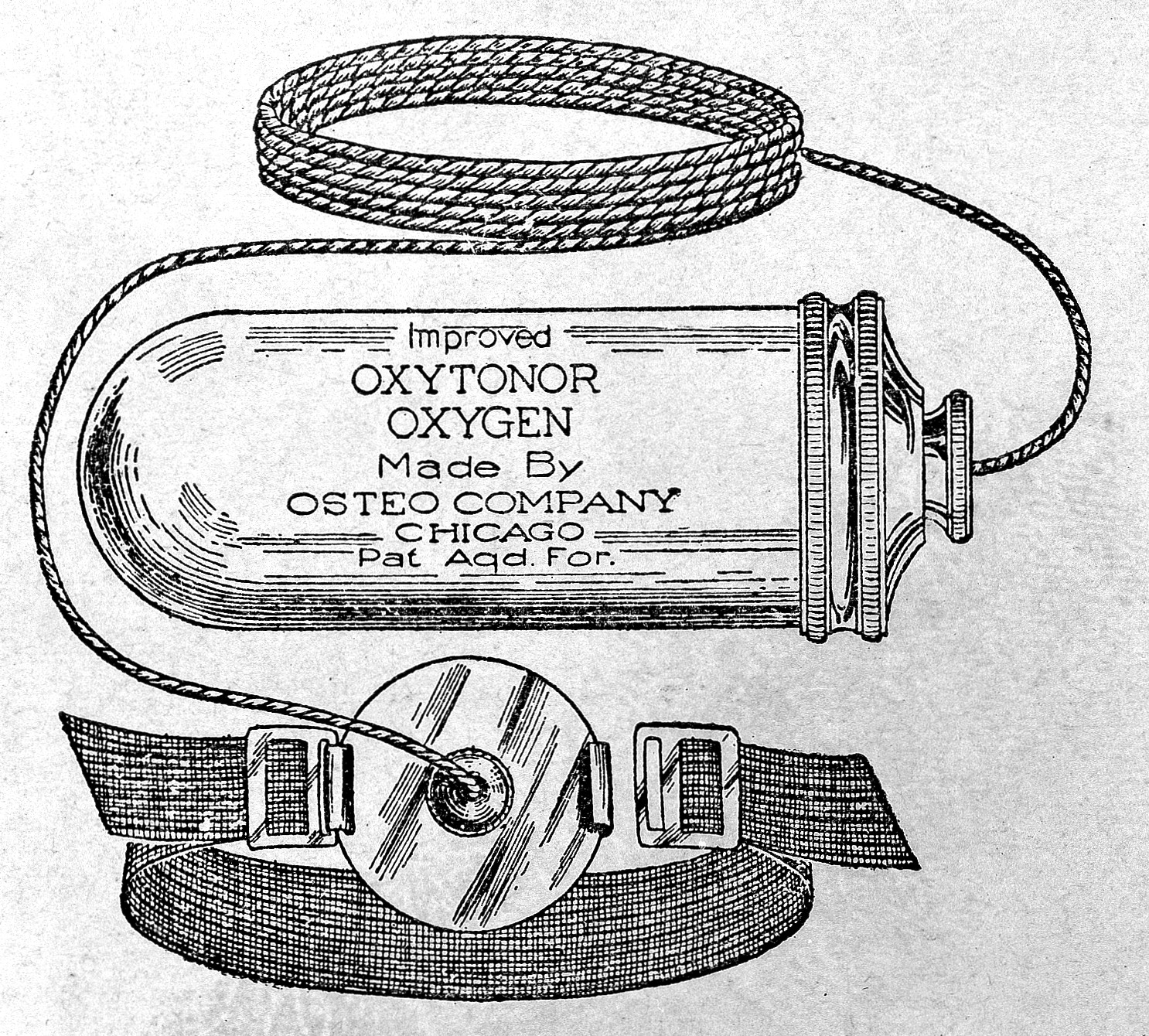
Oxytonor, a competitor

Skeptics pointed out the fraudulent logic used in claims and endorsements of its curative effect stating that it was dangerous use of post hoc ergo propter hoc as the logic.

Sanche was careful in that he never claimed that his device would cure diseases like tuberculosis. Others like E.L. Moses, inventor of Oxypathor, would go to jail for 18 months in 1915 for making false curative claims. The company was not without competition. A device called the Oxygenor was marketed by a rival and Sanche went to court. The court claimed that there was not enough evidence for the value of his invention and therefore that it could not be protected. Justice Shiras and the other judges declared that his theory of "diaduction" (a term he coined) was a mere pretense to allow him to obtain a patent. In Britain the Richardson Electro-Galvanic Belt of Ludgate Hill and the Magneto-Electric Battery Company were competing with Electropoise.

== See also ==
- Pulvermacher's chain
- Radionics
