= Electromagnetic therapy =

Therapies using magnetism

- Other names: Electromagnetic field therapy
- ICD-10-PCS: 6A2
- MeSH: D055909

Electromagnetic therapy or electromagnetic field therapy is therapy involving the use of electromagnetic radiation to alter neuronal activity. This subfield of neurotherapy uses medical devices, such as magnets or electromagnets to treat mental and physical health disorders in patients.

Types include :

- Bioelectromagnetics, the study of how electromagnetic fields interact with and influence biological processes.
- Electrotherapy, the use of electrical or electromagnetic energy in medicine;
- Electromagnetic therapy (alternative medicine), the use of electromagnetic radiation to treat disease. Evidence of efficacy is lacking.
- Pulsed electromagnetic field therapy, or PEMF, the use of weak electromagnetic fields to initiate osteogenesis.
- Alternating electric field therapy, also known as "Tumor Treating Fields", the use of electric fields as an anti-mitotic therapy for cancer patients.
- Transcranial magnetic stimulation (TMS), a non-invasive, widely approved therapy that uses magnetic fields to stimulate specific areas of the brain to treat depression, obsessive-compulsive disorder, and other neurological and psychiatric conditions, especially in patients who do not respond to medication, with strong clinical evidence supporting its effectiveness.
- Extracorporeal magnetotransduction therapy, a non-invasive electromagnetic therapy that uses high-intensity, rapidly oscillating magnetic fields (typically 100–300 kHz frequency and field strengths up to ~80–150 mT) to stimulate cellular activity, particularly for musculoskeletal conditions.

== See also ==
- Magnet therapy, use of static magnetic fields with the aim of treating disease. Evidence of efficacy is lacking.
- Neurotherapy
