= Pulsed radiofrequency =

Radio technique

Pulsed radiofrequency is the technique whereby radio frequency (RF) oscillations are gated at a rate of pulses (cycles) per second (one cycle per second is known as a hertz (Hz)). Radio frequency energies occupy 1.0×10^{4} Hz to 3.0×10^{11} Hz of the electromagnetic spectrum. Radio frequency electromagnetic energy is routinely produced by RF electrical circuits connected to a transducer, usually an antenna.

== Pulsed radio frequency waveforms ==
The figure below shows an example of a generalized pulsed radio frequency waveform as seen with an oscilloscope with an antenna probe. In this example there are 1000 pulses per second (one kilohertz pulse rate) with a gated pulse width of 42 μs. The pulse packet frequency in this example is 27.125 MHz of RF energy. The duty cycle for a pulsed radio frequency is the percent time the RF packet is on, 4.2% for this example ([0.042 ms × 1000 pulses divided by 1000 ms/s] × 100). The pulse packet form can be a square, triangle, sawtooth or sine wave. In several applications of pulse radio frequency, such as radar, times between pulses can be modulated.

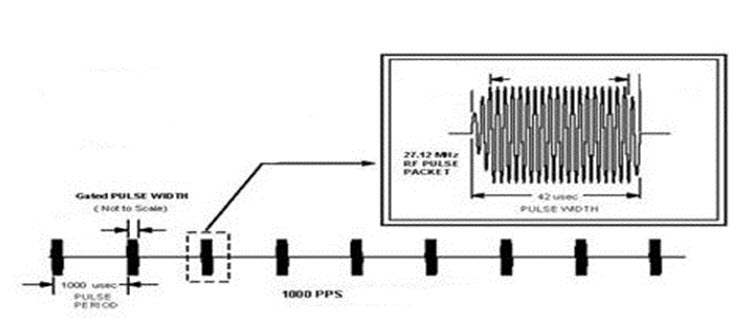
The pulse packet frequency in this example is 27.125 MHz of RF energy.

== Use in radar ==
The best understood and applied use of pulse radio frequency electromagnetic energy is their use in radar. The uses of radar are diverse and applied to military, civilian and space exploration. Radar is based on the reflection or scatter of pulsed radiofrequency waves emitted from a transmitter which are then detected by an antenna which then determines the range, speed, and direction of objects. In most uses the transmitter and detector are located at the same location. Radio frequencies used with radar are from 3 MHz to 300 GHz depending on the type and application.

== Therapeutic uses ==
Pulsed radiofrequency fields are an emerging technology used in the medical field for the treatment of tumors, cardiac arrhythmias, chronic and post-operative pain, bone fractures, and soft tissue wounds. There are two general categories of pulsed radiofrequency field therapies based on their mechanism of action: thermal and non-thermal (athermal).

While thermal radiofrequency ablation for tumors and cardiac arrhythmia has been used for over 25 years, non-thermal pulsed radio frequency is currently being developed for the ablation of cardiac arrhythmias and tumors. The technique uses pulsed radio frequency energy delivered via catheter at frequencies of 300–750 kHz for 30 to 60 seconds. Thermal pulsed radio frequency takes advantage of high current delivered focally by an electrode to ablate the tissue of interest. Generally, the tissue/electrode temperature reaches 60–75 °C, resulting in focal tissue destruction. Thermal-pulse radiofrequency ablation has also been used to lesion peripheral nerves to reduce chronic pain.

Non-thermal therapeutic uses of pulsed radio frequency are currently being used to treat pain and edema, chronic wounds, and bone repair. Pulsed radiofrequency therapy technologies are described by the acronyms EMF (electromagnetic field), PEMF (pulsed electromagnetic fields), PRF (pulsed radiofrequency fields), and PRFE (pulsed radiofrequency energy).

These technologies have varied in terms of their electric and magnetic field energies, pulse length, duty cycle, treatment time, and mode of delivery. Although pulsed radiofrequency has been used for medical treatment purposes for decades, peer-reviewed publications assessing the efficacy and physiological mechanism(s) are now starting to appear, addressing this technology.

Potential effects of non-thermal PEMFs are seen on some human cell types with different sensitivities, while the evidence suggests that frequencies higher than 100 Hz, magnetic flux densities between 1 and 10 mT, and chronic exposure more than 10 days would be more effective in establishing some cellular response.

== Natural sources ==
Natural occurring sources of pulsed radiofrequency exist in the form of stars called pulsars. Pulsars were discovered in 1967 using a radio telescope. These stars are thought to be rapidly spinning neutron stars. These stars have powerful magnetic fields which cause the star to emit strong radio frequencies. Different sizes of pulsars pulse at different rates.
