= Pulsed electromagnetic field therapy =

Attempted medical therapy using electromagnetic fields

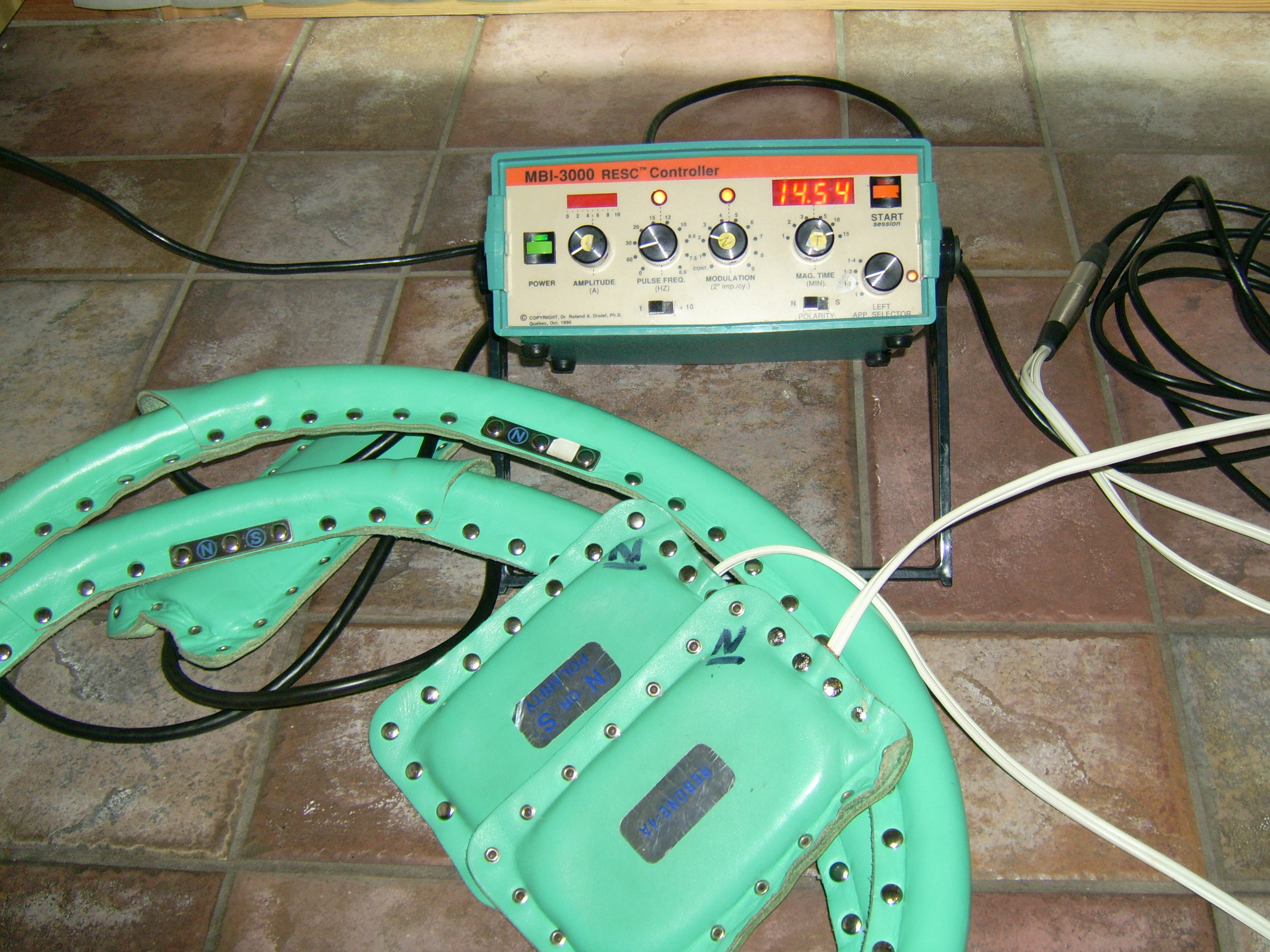
- Drolet's 1990 Rhumart system, a PEMF device
- Other names: Pulsed magnetic therapy, pulse magnetotherapy (PEMF)

Pulsed electromagnetic field therapy (PEMFT, or PEMF therapy), also known as low field magnetic stimulation (LFMS) is the use of electromagnetic fields in an attempt to heal non-union fractures and depression. By 2007, the FDA had cleared several such stimulation devices.

In 2013, the U.S. Food and Drug Administration (FDA) warned a manufacturer for promoting the device for unapproved uses such as cerebral palsy and spinal cord injury.

== Efficacy ==
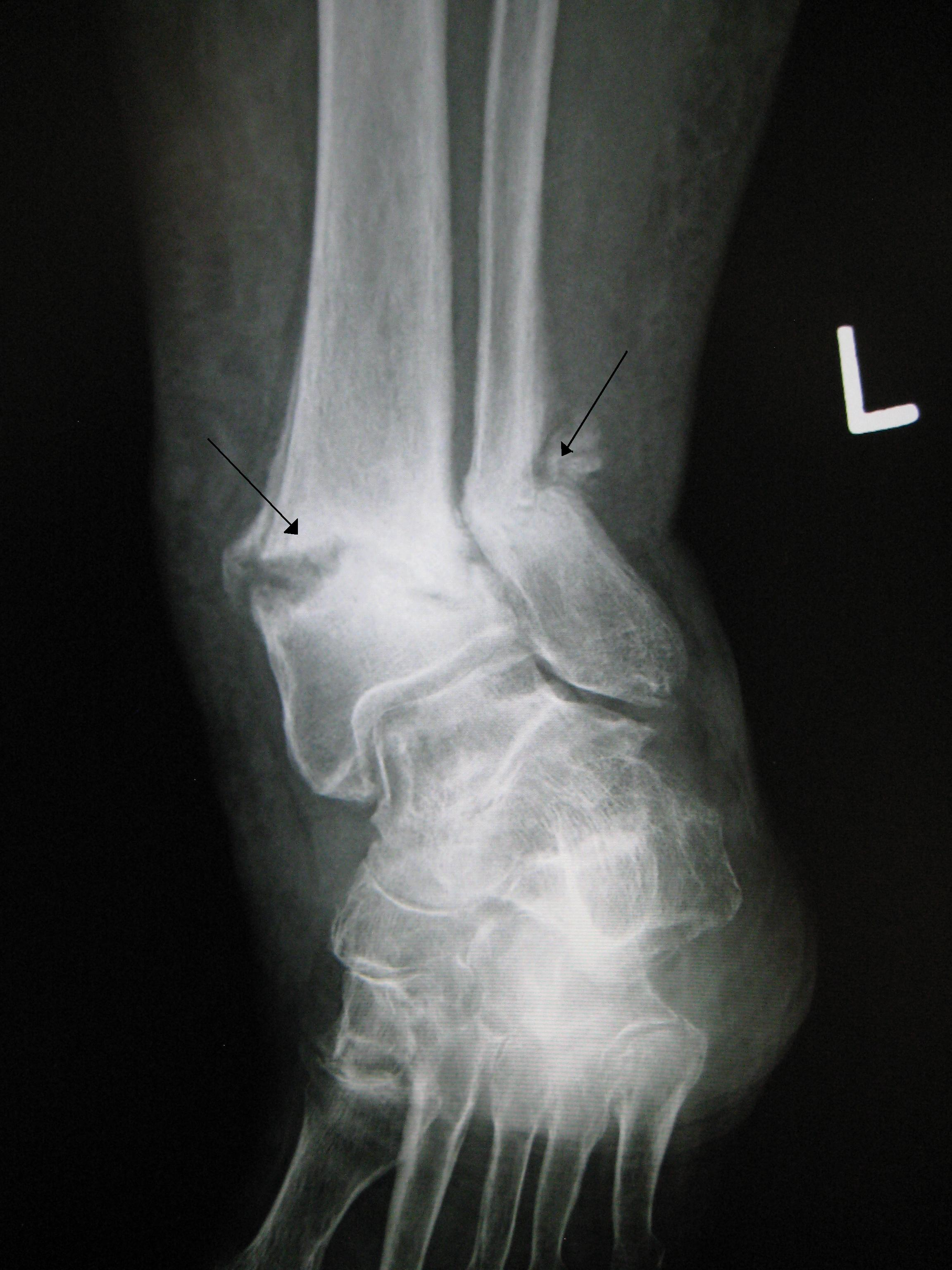
An old fracture with nonunion of the fracture fragments

While PEMF therapy is claimed to offer some benefits in the treatment of fractures, the evidence is inconclusive and is insufficient to inform current clinical practice.

== History ==
Prior to 2000, in parallel with the PEMF research being done in Western Europe, the United States, and Japan, a great deal of scientific work was being done in scientific isolation behind the Iron Curtain, as summarized in a detailed technical report, showing scientific evidence for promising benefits from the use of PEMF for a very wide range of applications including peripheral vascular disease, lung disease, gastrointestinal disease, neurological disease, rheumatic disease, pediatrics, dermatology, surgery, gynecology, oral medicine, otorhinolaryngology, ophthalmology, immunity, inflammation, reproduction, and tumors, based on over 200 referenced scientific papers involving both human and animal studies.

Veterinarians were the first health professionals to use PEMF therapy, usually to attempt to heal broken legs in racehorses. In 2004, a pulsed electromagnetic field system was approved by the FDA as an adjunct to cervical fusion surgery in patients at high risk for non-fusion. On 8/9 September 2020 the FDA recommended to shift PEMF medical devices from the Class 3 category to a Class 2 status. PEMF devices that have been FDA cleared are able to make health claims that require a doctor's prescription for use.

Although claims that electricity might aid bone healing were reported as early as 1841, it was not until the mid-1950s that scientists seriously studied the subject. During the 1970s, Bassett and his team introduced a new approach which attempted to treat delayed fractures, a technique that employed a very specific biphasic low frequency signal to be applied for non-union/delayed fractures. The use of electrical stimulation in the lumbosacral region was first attempted by Alan Dwyer of Australia.

== Wellness devices ==
The original PEMF devices consisted of a Helmholtz coil which generated a magnetic field. The patient's body was placed inside the magnetic field to deliver treatment. Today, the majority of PEMF wellness devices resemble a typical yoga mat in dimensions but are slightly thicker to house several flat spiral coils to produce an even electromagnetic field. A frequency generator is then used to energize the coils to create a pulsed electromagnetic field. A wide variety of professional and consumer PEMF devices are sold and marketed as FDA-registered wellness devices. The majority are manufactured in Germany, Austria and Switzerland and are imported into North America as electric massagers or full body electric yoga mats. They are either placed on a massage table for clinical use or directly on the floor in the home to practice simple yoga postures. The companies that sell and manufacture them as "general wellness products" are not permitted to make medical claims of effectiveness in treating disease.

== See also ==
- Neuromodulation
- Neurostimulation
- Neurotechnology
- Neurotherapy
- Radionics
- Pulsed radiofrequency#Therapeutic uses
- Transcranial magnetic stimulation
