= Hulda Regehr Clark =

Canadian naturopath and author (1928–2009)

- Hulda in the early-to-mid-1990s
- Born: 18 October 1928; Rosthern, Saskatchewan, Canada
- Died: 3 September 2009 (aged 80); Chula Vista, California, U.S.

Hulda Regehr Clark (18 October 1928 – 3 September 2009) was a Canadian naturopath, author, and practitioner of alternative medicine. Clark was notorious for quackery, claiming all human disease was related to parasitic infection, and also claimed to be able to cure all diseases, including cancer and HIV/AIDS, by "zapping" them with electrical devices which she marketed. Clark wrote several books describing her methods and operated clinics in the United States. Following a string of lawsuits and eventual action by the Federal Trade Commission, she relocated to Tijuana, Mexico, where she ran the Century Nutrition clinic.

Clark's claims and devices have been dismissed by authorities, ranging from the United States Federal Trade Commission and Food and Drug Administration to CAM figures such as Andrew Weil, as scientifically unfounded, "bizarre", and potentially fraudulent. Clark died 3 September 2009 from blood and bone cancer.

== Background ==
Clark began her studies in biology at the University of Saskatchewan, Canada, where she was awarded Bachelor of Arts and Master of Arts degrees. After two years of study at McGill University, she attended the University of Minnesota studying biophysics and cell physiology. She received her doctorate degree in 1958 from the University of Minnesota. Her own biographical sketch states her degree was in physiology, but the Graduate School's Register of Ph.D. Degrees conferred by the University of Minnesota, July 1956 – June 1966, states she received a Ph.D. in Zoology in 1958. Her thesis was entitled A Study of the Ion Balance of Crayfish Muscle: evidence for two compartments of cellular potassium.

In 1979, Clark left government-funded research and began private consulting and her own research. From 2002 until her death she operated the Century Nutrition health clinic in Tijuana, Mexico, where her focus was primarily on late-stage cancer patients. Clark and her son Geoff separately owned businesses her patients and others used, including a restaurant, her self-publishing company, and a "self-health" store that sold her inventions. She published several books, including The Cure of All Cancers, The Cure for HIV/AIDS and The Cure For All Diseases. According to civil court records, her books generated over $7 million in sales by 2002, although Clark disputed this figure.

She held a naturopathy degree from the non-accredited and defunct Clayton College of Natural Health, a school lacking accreditation from any accreditation agency recognized by the United States Department of Education.

== Treatment claims ==
According to Clark, all disease is caused by foreign organisms and pollutants that damage the immune system. She asserted that eliminating these organisms from the body using herbal or electrical means while removing pollutants from the diet would cure all diseases.

In her book The Cure For All Cancers, Clark postulated all cancers and many other diseases are caused by the flatworm Fasciolopsis buski. "The adult [fluke], though, stays tightly stuck to our intestine or liver, causing cancer, or uterus, causing endometriosis, or thymus, causing AIDS, or kidney, causing Hodgkin's disease)." "I have found that cancer, HIV, diabetes, endometriosis, Hodgkin's disease, Alzheimer's disease, lupus, MS and "universal allergy syndrome" are examples of fluke disease." However, this worm does not live in the United States or Europe, but mainly in India, parts of China, Vietnam and other east-Asian countries, and only in rural areas where people are eating unboiled food from water plants, or where pigs live close to humans. According to Clark, depression is caused by hookworms. Epilepsy and seizures are caused by swelling in the brain, attracting calcium and heavy metals, the swelling being caused by parasites of the genus Ascaris as well as by malvin, a natural dye found in strawberries, chicken, and eggs.

Clark claimed she could cure all diseases, whereas, she asserted, conventional treatments for diseases, such as cancer and HIV/AIDS, often only aim to relieve symptoms. She was described in the book Denying AIDS as "perhaps the first quack AIDS curer". David Amrein's website contains a disclaimer stating that her treatments are "not prescribed as treatment for medical or psychological conditions" and "...the treatments outlined herein are not intended to be a replacement or substitute for other forms of conventional medical treatment." Nonetheless, Clark advocated for the use of her methods as a substitute for standard medical care:

Does this mean you can cancel your date for surgery, radiation or chemotherapy? YES! After curing your cancer with this recipe it cannot come back ... Remember that oncologists are kind, sensitive, compassionate people. They want the best for you. They have no way of knowing about the true cause and cure of cancer since it has not been published for them.

Regarding the effectiveness of her treatment, Clark wrote, "The method is 100% effective in stopping cancer regardless of the type of cancer or how terminal it may be. It follows that this method must work for you, too, if you are able to carry out the instructions."

== Major themes in her books ==
- Diet Cleanup: Clark said that most foods and supplements were sullied by contaminants such as heavy metals and mycotoxins.
- Homeography: According to Clark, a "new science ... which is the electronic analog of homeopathy." She said an electronic signature of a substance can be transferred into bottles making a "bottle copy" of the original substance and that it can be done indefinitely.
- Liver flush: She advocated detoxification through a "liver flush". She said it removes gallstones and parasites from the liver and bile ducts. This involves fasting, epsom salt laxatives and a mixture of olive oil and grapefruit juice (the latter being known to interact with many prescription drugs).
- Parasites: Clark said people have parasites that cause numerous problems. She described herbal and electronic methods to remove them, such as her Zapper device (see below).
- Syncrometer: A "bioresonance" device developed by Clark and claimed to detect contaminants in substances at an accuracy of one part per quadrillion (ppq).
- Zapper: A device to pulse low voltage direct current (DC) through the body at specific frequencies. Clark said this device kills viruses, bacteria and parasites. In one case, a patient with a cardiac pacemaker suffered arrhythmias as a side effect of her "Zapper".

== Sting operation, flight, arrest, and legal issues ==
=== Indiana ===
In 1993, while Clark lived and practiced in Indiana, a former patient complained to the Indiana attorney general. An investigator for the Indiana Department of Health and a deputy attorney general visited her office incognito as part of a sting operation. Clark proceeded to test the investigator and "told him he had the HIV virus [sic], but said that he did not have cancer." She told the investigator that she could cure his HIV in three minutes, but that he would "get it back" unless he committed to returning for six more appointments. She then ordered blood tests from a laboratory.

Unknown to the investigators, Clark learned of the undercover investigators' status. She then stated everything she had told them had been a "mistake". Two days later, before an arrest warrant could be served, she had vacated the premises and disappeared.

Six years later, in September 1999, Clark was located and arrested in San Diego, California, based on a fugitive warrant from Indiana. According to Clark, this was the first time she learned about the charge. Her lawyer protested the long delay before her arrest, but a prosecutor implied that she fled Indiana "when she learned that she was being investigated by the state," and the local police department had limited resources to devote to finding her. She was returned to Indiana to stand trial, where she was charged with practicing medicine without a license. The charge was later dismissed for failure to provide her with a speedy trial. The judge's verdict did not address the merits of the charges but only the issue of whether the delay had compromised Clark's ability to mount a defense and her right to a speedy trial.

=== Mexico ===
In February 2001, Mexican authorities inspected Clark's Century Nutrition clinic and ordered it shut down, as the clinic had never registered and was operating without a license. In June 2001, the Mexican authorities announced that the clinic would be permitted to reopen, but was prohibited from offering "alternative" treatments. The clinic was also fined 160,000 pesos (about $18,000), and Clark was barred from working in Mexico, even as a consultant; however, the San Diego Union-Tribune reported in 2003 that there was evidence that Clark continued to work at the clinic.

=== Federal Trade Commission and Food and Drug Administration action ===
The Federal Trade Commission brought a complaint against the Dr. Clark Research Foundation because of the foundation's claims about the effectiveness of the Syncrometer, the Super-Zapper Deluxe and "Dr. Clark's New 21 Day Program for Advanced Cancers." In November 2004, the case reached stipulated judgment, wherein the case's judge ordered the foundation's operators to offer refunds to the purchasers of these devices and to refrain from making a number of claims about those devices. The Director of Enforcement at the Food and Drug Administration has stated Clark's devices seem to be "fraudulent".

== Evaluation of claims and criticism ==
Hulda Clark has been criticized because her claims lack scientific validity and consist of anecdotal evidence. Joseph Pizzorno, a prominent naturopath who was founding president of the naturopathic school Bastyr University, evaluated Clark's claims and found that her books mixed patients with conventionally diagnosed cancer with those whose cancer diagnosis was based solely on her use of the "Syncrometer". The patients with medically diagnosed cancer did not respond to Clark's treatment, while those she had diagnosed using the "Syncrometer" were "cured". Pizzorno concluded that Clark's treatments were ineffective and treatments based on Clark's recommendations "pose a substantive public health danger".

The Swiss Study Group for Complementary and Alternative Methods in Cancer (SCAC) issued a strong warning to cancer patients considering Clark's methods:

There is no scientific basis for Hulda Clark's hypotheses and recommendations, including her suggested treatments. The parasite Fasciolopsis buskii does in fact exist, but only in Asian countries, so that an infection in our country is ruled out. Consequently, this parasite does not enter into consideration as a cause of the numerous cases of cancer in the Western countries; at most, it might be one of several causes of liver cancer (and only for this type of cancer) in the Asian countries. As a whole, Clark's thesis cannot be comprehended, nor is it proven. In individual cases, her advice can be very extensive and costly. Hence if patients do not apply her method consistently and their disease continues to progress, they run the risk of attempting to blame themselves for this, rather than Clark's treatment which is ineffective, as viewed at present.

Prominent alternative medicine proponent Andrew Weil has written, "No studies have backed up [Clark's] bizarre claims, and it's unclear whether the cancer patients she's supposedly cured ever had cancer to begin with."

In 2002, the San Diego Union-Tribune reported Clark and her son Geoff operated a restaurant and leased housing for patients at Clark's Tijuana clinic. The article described a couple whose daughter with spinal muscular atrophy was treated for 10 months by Clark at a cost of approximately $30,000 without improvement. Despite the cost and lack of improvement, the couple stated Clark insisted she was close to curing the child, and stopping treatment might endanger her. The patient's mother commented, "People don't understand why we stayed so long, but Hulda Clark did a very good job of preying on us," and Clark, while stating she could not respond to the parents' allegations on grounds of patient confidentiality, denied their statements in general.

== Death ==
Clark died on 3 September 2009 in Chula Vista, California, of multiple myeloma (a blood and bone cancer). In memoriam, Oskar Thorvaldsson of the Self Health Resource Center, recalled that he first learned that she had been diagnosed by a doctor to have died from arthritis and spinal cord injury. A month later, on 6 October, her family published a summary of her death, mentioning that her doctors had diagnosed her with multiple myeloma, a blood and bone cancer, as "the most likely cause".

== Works ==
- The Three Owls Reading Method (1965–67)
- The Cure for All Cancers (1993)
- The Cure For HIV / AIDS (1993)
- The Cure for All Diseases (1995)
- The Cure For All Advanced Cancers (1999)
- Syncrometer Science Laboratory Manual (2000)
- The Prevention of all Cancers (2004)
- The Cure and Prevention of All Cancers (2007)

== See also ==
- Radionics
- List of unproven and disproven cancer treatments
