= Radionics =

Form of alternative medicine

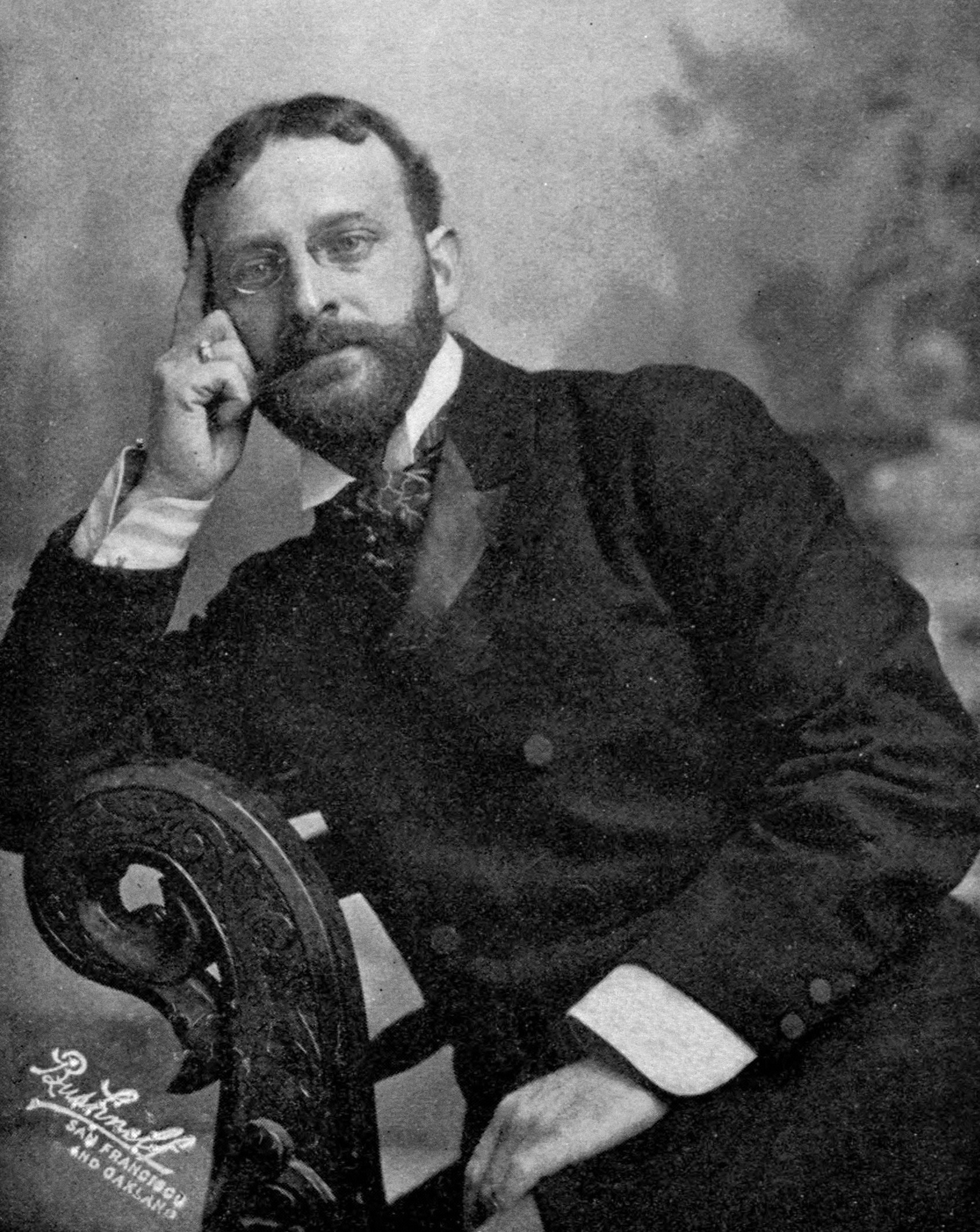
Albert Abrams (1863–1924), Photo c. 1900

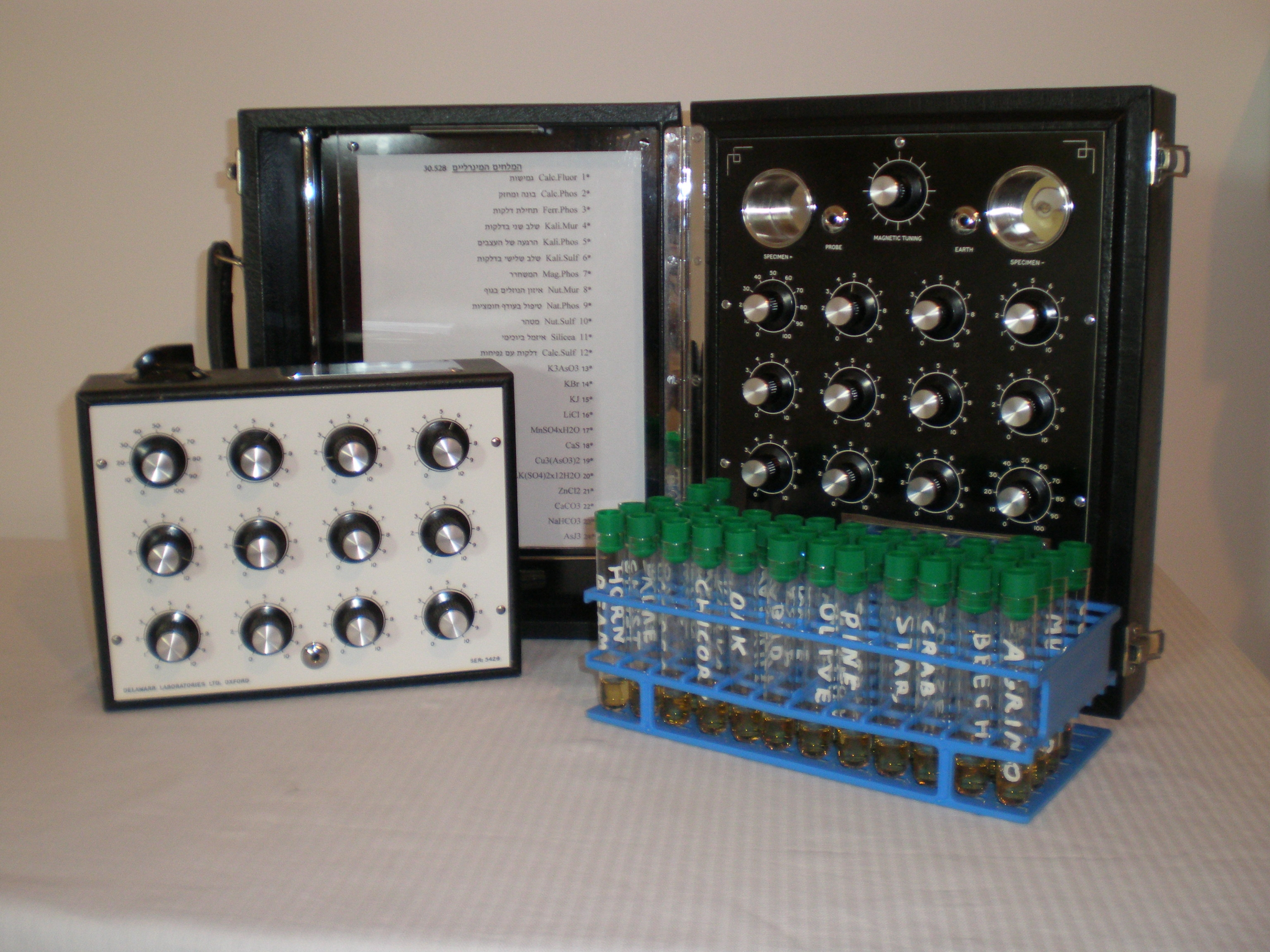
Radionic instruments

Radionics—also called electromagnetic therapy (EMT) and the Abrams method—is a form of alternative medicine that claims that disease can be diagnosed and treated by applying electromagnetic radiation (EMR), such as radio waves, to the body from an electrically powered device. It is similar to magnet therapy, which also applies EMR to the body but uses a magnet that generates a static electromagnetic field.

The concept behind radionics originated with two books published by American physician Albert Abrams in 1909 and 1910. Over the next decade, Abrams became a millionaire by leasing EMT machines, which he designed himself. This so-called treatment contradicts the principles of physics and biology and therefore is widely considered pseudoscientific. The United States Food and Drug Administration does not recognize any legitimate medical use for radionic devices.

Several systematic reviews have shown radionics is no more effective than placebo and falls into the category of pseudoscience.

== History ==
Beginning around 1909, Albert Abrams (1864–1924) began to claim that he could detect "energy frequencies" in his patients' bodies. The idea was that a healthy person will have certain energy frequencies moving through their body that define health, while an unhealthy person will exhibit other, different energy frequencies that define disorders. He said he could cure people by "balancing" their discordant frequencies and claimed that his devices are sensitive enough that he could tell someone's religion by looking at a drop of blood. He developed thirteen devices and became a millionaire leasing his devices, and the American Medical Association described him as the "dean of gadget quacks". His devices were definitively proven useless by an independent investigation commissioned by Scientific American in 1924. He used "frequency" not in its standard meaning, but to describe an imputed energy type, which does not correspond to any property of energy in the scientific sense.

In one form of radionics popularised by Abrams, some blood on a bit of filter paper is attached to a device Abrams called a "dynamizer", which is attached by wires to a string of other devices and then to the forehead of a healthy volunteer, facing west in a dim light. By tapping on his abdomen and searching for areas of "dullness", disease in the donor of the blood is diagnosed by proxy. Handwriting analysis is also used to diagnose disease under this scheme. Having done this, the practitioner may use a special device known as an oscilloclast or any of a range of other devices to broadcast vibrations at the patient in order to attempt to heal them.

Other notable quack devices in radionics have included the Ionaco and the Hieronymus machine.

Some people claim to have the paranormal or parapsychological ability to detect "radiation" within the human body, which they call radiesthesia. According to the theory, all human bodies give off unique or characteristic "radiations" as do all other physical bodies or objects. Such radiations are often termed an "aura". Radiesthesia is cited as the explanation of such phenomena as dowsing by rods and pendulums in order to locate buried substances, diagnose illnesses, and the like. Radiesthesia has been described as a mixture of occultism and pseudoscience by critics.

Modern practitioners conceptualize these devices merely as a focusing aid to the practitioner's proclaimed dowsing abilities, and claim that there is no longer any need for the device to have any demonstrable function. Indeed, Abrams's black boxes had no purpose of their own, being merely obfuscated collections of wires and electronic parts.

Contemporary proponents of radionics or EMT claim that where there is an imbalance of electromagnetic fields or frequencies, within the body, that it causes diseases or other illnesses by disrupting the body's chemical makeup. These practitioners believe that applications of electromagnetic energy from outside the body can correct these imbalances. Like magnet therapy, electromagnetic therapy has been proposed by practitioners of alternative medicine for a variety of purposes, including, according to the American Cancer Society, "ulcers, headaches, burns, chronic pain, nerve disorders, spinal cord injuries, diabetes, gum infections, asthma, bronchitis, arthritis, cerebral palsy, heart disease, and cancer".

Another variant of radionics or EMT is magnetic resonance therapy.

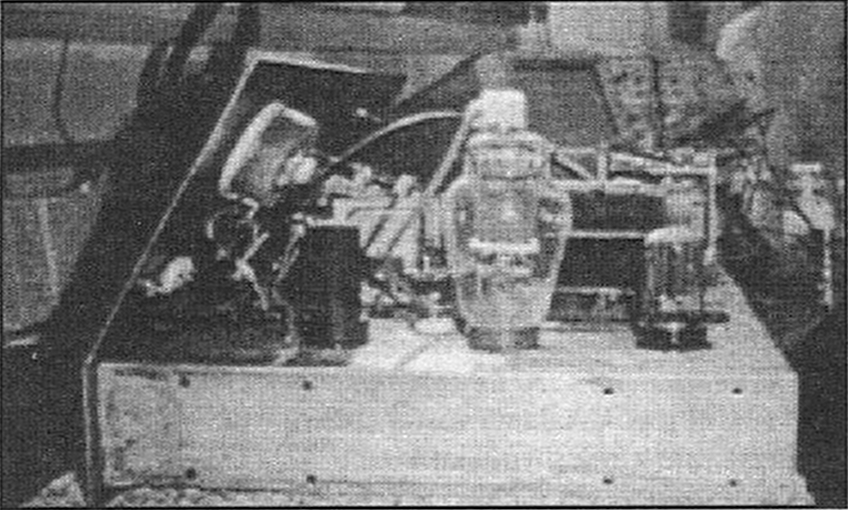
An original Rife machine from 1922

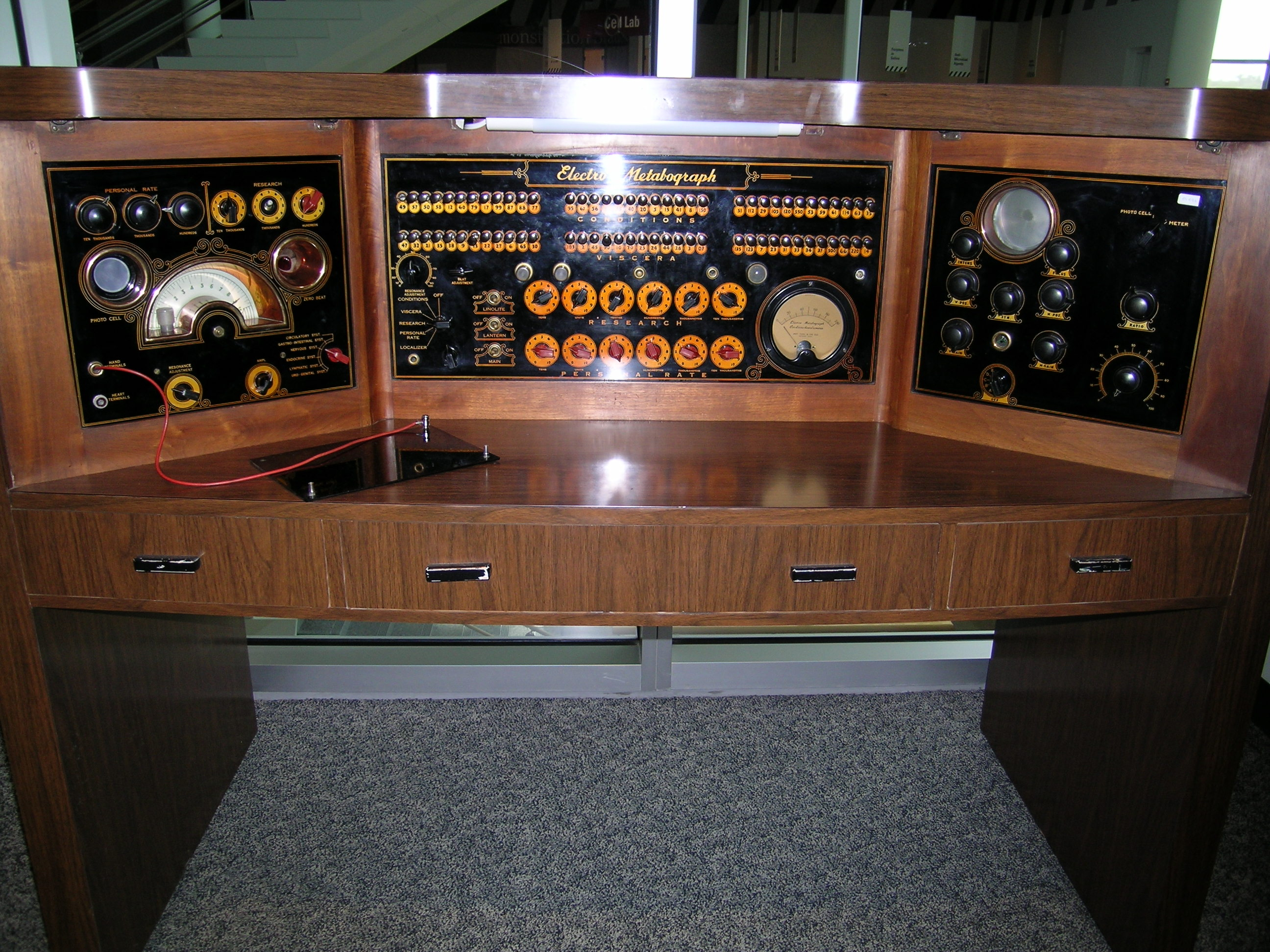
An "Electro-metabograph", an apparatus which supposedly diagnosed and cured diseases by using radio waves

== Scientific assessment ==
The claims for radionic devices contradict the accepted principles of biology and physics. No scientifically verifiable mechanisms of function for these devices has been posited, and they are often described as "magical" in operation. No plausible biophysical basis for the "putative energy fields" has been proposed, and neither the fields themselves nor their purported therapeutic effects have been convincingly demonstrated.

No radionic device has been found efficacious in the diagnosis or treatment of any disease, and the U.S. Food and Drug Administration does not recognize any legitimate medical uses of any such device. According to David Helwig in The Gale Encyclopedia of Alternative Medicine, "most physicians dismiss radionics as quackery".

Internally, a radionic device is very simple and may not even form a functional electrical circuit. The wiring in the analysis device is simply used as a mystical conduit. A radionic device does not use or need electric power, though a power cord may be provided, ostensibly to determine a "base rate" on which the device operates to attempt to heal a subject. Typically, little attempt is made to define or describe what, if anything, is flowing along the wires and being measured. Energy in the physical sense, i.e., energy that can be sensed and measured, is viewed as subordinate to intent and "creative action".

Claims about contemporary EMT devices are similar to those made by the older generation of "radionics" devices, are also not supported by evidence, and are also pseudoscientific. Even though some of the early works in bioelectromagnetics have been applied in clinical medicine, the use of electromagnetic energy in mainstream medicine is completely unrelated to alternative devices or methods that use externally applied electrical forces.

The American Cancer Society says that "relying on electromagnetic treatment alone and avoiding conventional medical care may have serious health consequences". In some cases the devices may be ineffective and harmful.

=== Reviews ===
Several systematic reviews have shown EMT is not a useful therapy:

- In 2009 no significant difference from control was found for management of pain or stiffness for osteoarthritis.
- In 2011 a systematic literature review on the use of pulsed electromagnetic field (PEMT) body mats used in a wide range of conditions found insufficient evidence for them to be recommended and recommended further high‐quality, double‐blind trials.
- In 2014 insufficient for the efficacy of EMT as a therapy for urinary incontinence.
- In 2014 EMT was found to have no difference from control for stimulation of bone growth in acute fractures.
- In 2015 Cochrane Database of Systematic Reviews found no evidence that EMT was useful in healing pressure ulcers or venous stasis ulcers.
- A 2016 guideline, in addition to reviews in 2016, 2013 and 2022, did not find EMT useful for various forms of pain.

== EMT devices ==
The FDA has banned some commercially available EMT devices. In 2008 the VIBE machine from Vibe Technologies had a Class I recall that was completed in 2012.

Other ineffectual EMT therapy devices that have been marketed include:

- "BioResonance Tumor Therapy", developed by Martin Keymer and purported to stimulate the P53 gene to cure cancer.
- "Cell Com System", a device created by Hugo Nielsen that is used on hands and feet to regulate communications between cells in the body.
- "Rife machine", a device created by Royal Rife, which is also known as frequency therapy or frequency generator and marketed as treating cancer.
- "Zapping Machine", a device created by Hulda Regehr Clark, claimed to cure cancer by using low-level electrical current to kill parasites within the body that are supposed to cause cancer.
- "EMP Pad", a device manufactured by EMPPad, advertised by Noel Edmonds, that is claimed to slow ageing, reduce pain, lift depression and stress and tackles cancer.
- "UVLrx", a device manufactured by UVLrx Therapeutics that provides ultraviolet treatment of blood to treat HIV/AIDS, Hepatitis C, Dengue fever and Lyme disease, as well as many other conditions.
- "ReBuilder", a device manufactured by Rebuilder, is claimed to reverse neuropathy (nerve damage) by using tiny electrical signals to wake up nerves.
- "Electro Physiological Feedback Xrroid (EPFX)", a device manufactured by Desiré Dubounet that is claimed to cure cancer, as well as other serious conditions by sending electromagnetic frequencies into the body.

== Notable practitioners ==
- Albert Abrams
- Kimberly Bailey
- Hulda Regehr Clark
- Ruth B. Drown
- Desiré Dubounet
- Thomas Galen Hieronymus
- Georges Lakhovsky
- Antoine Prioré
- Royal Raymond Rife
- Hercules Sanche
- George de la Warr
- H. A. Morton Whitby

== See also ==
- Biophoton – a term used by EMT proponents
- Electropoise
- Neuromodulation
- Neurostimulation
- Psionics
- Pulsed electromagnetic field therapy
