= Kent Holtorf =

American physician

- Born: June 23, 1964 (age 62)
- Education: Postgraduate
- Alma mater: University of California at Los Angeles, St. Louis University School of Medicine
- Occupation: Medical Doctor
- Years active: 17
- Employer: Holtorf Medical Group

Kent Holtorf (born 1964) is an American physician and entrepreneur practicing in Los Angeles, California. He is a board examiner of the American Board of Anti-Aging Medicine (ABAAM), which is not recognized by established medical organizations. He is the founder and medical director of Holtorf Medical Group, a practice with five centers that offer treatment for conditions including fibromyalgia, adrenal fatigue (a non-existent condition), complex endocrine dysfunction, hypothyroidism, age management, chronic fatigue syndrome, low libido, chronic Lyme disease, migraines, PMS, perimenopause and menopause. His practice focuses on alternative therapies that are not recognised as effective. He has been criticized in the media for his controversial views on topics like bioidentical hormone replacement therapy and vaccines.

== Professional status and publications ==
Holtorf is a graduate of the University of California at Los Angeles. He is also a graduate of the St. Louis University School of Medicine, where he received his doctorate of medicine then returned to UCLA for residency training. He has maintained a clinical practice since 1994 and is a former medical director of the Fibromyalgia and Fatigue Centers, Inc. (FFC). Holtorf has published a number of endocrine reviews on complex topics in peer-reviewed journals on controversial diseases and treatments. He is a guest editor and peer-reviewer for a number of medical journals including Endocrine, is the current AOL Health Expert in Endocrinology, and is a diplomate and board examiner of the American Board of Anti-Aging Medicine (ABAAM). He is a founding member of The Bioidentical Hormone Initiative (BHI), and a founder and director of the National Academy of Hypothyroidism (NAH). In 2001, Holtorf established the Holtorf Medical Group.

== Controversy ==
Holtorf has been the subject of criticism online and in the media for several years for his promotion of controversial diagnostic methods. He has been an advocate of bioidentical hormones, which has been labeled as quackery. He published an extensive review on the safety and efficacy of bioidentical hormones in the peer-reviewed journal Post Graduate Medicine. The review concluded, “Physiological data and clinical outcomes demonstrate that bioidentical hormones are associated with lower risks, including the risk of breast cancer and cardiovascular disease, and are more efficacious than their synthetic and animal derived counterparts. Until evidence is found to the contrary, bioidentical hormones remain the preferred method of HRT. Further randomized controlled trials are needed to delineate these differences more clearly.” The conclusions were contrary to mainstream opinions on the use of bioidentical hormones. Additionally, many argue that the extensive use of compounded bioidentical hormones is risky because they can be inconsistent and unstable and are not always subject to FDA oversight.

Holtorf has also taken an unpopular stance that children are over vaccinated and that vaccines may be associated with autism. Televised appearances and interviews have put Holtorf's views front and center and invited criticism and debate. Among them, his 2009 appearance on Fox News in regards to the H1N1 vaccine, in which Holtorf plainly states he "definitely would not" administer the controversial vaccine to his own children, is one of the most highly deliberated. Holtorf likewise links high levels of vaccine adjuncts, such as mercury, to some cases of autism development in children during the interview and is questionably identified on the program as an infectious disease expert. This view is contrary to the position statements of agencies such as the Centers for Disease Control and the Institute of Medicine, and societies such as the American Academy of Pediatrics, who state that there is no credible evidence that vaccines have any link to autism.

== Diagnosis and treatment of hypothyroidism ==
Holtorf states that the standard thyroid tests which are typically relied upon by primary care and specialist physicians to diagnosis hypothyroidism (low thyroid) and determine dosage are insufficient because they focus on TSH levels as an indicator of thyroid function and miss a large percentage of people with low thyroid. This is discussed extensively on the website of his nonprofit organization the National Academy of Hypothyroidism. Instead, Holtorf advocates labs and diagnostics which look at all thyroid hormone levels, with a particular emphasis on free T3, triiodothyronine, the active hormone both produced by the thyroid and converted from T4, levothyroxine, and reverse T3, a metabolite of T4 conversion usually created during times of stress or trauma. This is contrary to position statements by societies such as the American Thyroid Association and American Association of Clinical Endocrinologist. Holtorf condones treating hypothyroidism with compounded combinations of bioidentical thyroid hormones.

== Diagnosis and treatment of CFS and fibromyalgia ==
Chronic fatigue syndrome (CFS) and fibromyalgia are two separate disorders that share many overlapping symptoms and are often cross-diagnosed. FDA approved therapies for the treatment of fibromyalgia include Cymbalta (duloxetine hydrochloride), Lyrica (pregabalin), and Savella (milnacipran HCL); while there are no FDA approved medications for the treatment of chronic fatigue syndrome. Other medications that are commonly used include tryicylcic antidepressants, SSRI antidepressants, Nonsteroidal anti-inflammatory drugs (NSAIDs) and muscle relaxants. In contrast, Dr Holtorf advocates a controversial six step plan that involves the treatment of hormone imbalances, mitochondrial dysfunction, sleep disturbances, and chronic infections.

== Diagnosis and treatment of Lyme disease ==
The Infectious Disease Society of America states that Lyme disease is easily treated with a few weeks of antibiotics and that chronic Lyme disease does not exist. Their position is that standard blood tests are an accurate means of determining the presence of Lyme disease.

== Weight loss ==
Holtorf maintains a controversial stance that weight loss is not an issue of diet and exercise, citing causes for the inability to lose weight as leptin resistance, undiagnosed hypothyroidism, environmental toxins, hypometabolism and dysfunctional weight set-point.

Leptin resistance is described as a condition in which overweight individuals are unable to respond to the hormone’s signals appropriately, leading to a starvation response in the body as well as hypothyroid symptoms at the cellular level where they are more difficult to detect. Holtorf treats leptin resistance in patients with a class of medications that are typically reserved for controlling blood sugar levels in diabetics.

A suppressed or "wrecked" metabolism is another cause of obesity commonly cited by Holtorf. Holtorf claims the metabolism, when subjected to repeated or overzealous dieting and exercise, will regulate itself by repressing thyroid hormone levels in the body, resulting in a hypothyroid state. Even the return to normal intake of food or levels of exercise will not be substantial enough to return the metabolism to its previous state. According to his website, holtorfmed.com, this leads to a permanently or chronically suppressed metabolism and Holtorf issues metabolic testing for patients exhibiting metabolism suppression, as well as labs denoting thyroid and other hormone levels.

Set-Point malfunction is another theory proposed and supported by Holtorf, which suggests that the body is programmed to return to a set weight and that this point can be altered by numerous medications, resulting in weight gain. Holtorf prescribes naltrexone, an opioid receptor blocker, used most often to treat opiate addiction, and bupropion (Wellbutrin), a common antidepressant, to reduce the body's set-point.
