= List of questionable diagnostic tests =

This is a list of medical diagnostic tests that are considered questionable, unverified or refuted.

- Applied kinesiology, including the Bi-Digital O Ring Test
- Barnes Basal Temperature Test
- Breast thermography
- Electro Physiological Feedback Xrroid (EPFX)
- Electrodermal diagnostic devices (e.g. Vega machines, E-meters)
- Genetic tests for "reward deficiency syndrome"
- Hair analysis
- IgG antibody testing for food intolerances and food allergies
- Live blood analysis
- Myers–Briggs Type Indicator (MBTI)
- Pendulum dowsing
- Proove Opioid Risk test (POR)
- Provoked urine testing for heavy metal toxicity
- Radionics
- SPECT scans for diagnosing psychological disorders
- Unvalidated Lyme disease testing, often used to diagnose so-called chronic Lyme disease
- Unvalidated mycotoxin tests

== See also ==
- List of topics characterized as pseudoscience
- Quackery
- List of diagnoses characterized as pseudoscience
