= The Quiet Epidemic =

2008 film about chronic Lyme disease

- Directed by: Lindsay Keys, Winslow Crane-Murdoch
- Produced by: Chris Hegedus, Lindsay Keys, Daria Lombroso
- Distributed by: First Run Features
- Release date: 2022
- Running time: 112 minutes
- Country: United States
- Language: English

The Quiet Epidemic is a 2022 documentary film focusing on chronic Lyme disease, a pseudoscientific diagnosis promoted by an antiscience movement. The film was directed by Winslow Crane-Murdoch and Lindsay Keys. It premiered at the 2022 Hot Docs Canadian International Documentary Festival.

== See also ==
- Under Our Skin
