= Under Our Skin =

2008 film about chronic Lyme disease

- Theatrical poster
- Directed by: Andy Abrahams Wilson
- Produced by: Andrew Abrahams
- Distributed by: Shadow Distribution
- Release dates: April 2008 (Tribeca); June 19, 2009 (United States)
- Running time: 103 minutes
- Country: United States
- Language: English

Under Our Skin: The Untold Story of Lyme Disease is a 2008 film advocating for the existence of "chronic Lyme disease", a controversial and unrecognized diagnosis. The film was directed by Andy Abrahams Wilson, who became interested in the subject after his sister claimed to be afflicted by "chronic Lyme." The film had its theatrical premiere on June 19, 2009 at the IFC Center in New York City.

== Synopsis ==
The film argues that persistent infection with Lyme disease is responsible for a variety of debilitating symptoms. It presents advocates of the position, including "chronic Lyme" pressure group International Lyme and Associated Diseases Society (ILADS). This position is rejected by major medical bodies including the Infectious Diseases Society of America and the American Academy of Neurology, who do not recognize "chronic" Lyme disease as a legitimate diagnosis.

The film follows six individuals, including major league ball player Ben Petrick who report chronic symptoms, which they attribute to persistent Lyme infection. The majority of the film is devoted to the storyline of these patients and their reported recovery. At the same time, the film presents advocates of long-term therapies for chronic Lyme disease and briefly presents the position of the Infectious Diseases Society of America (IDSA).

The second half of the film focuses primarily on state medical board investigations of Joseph Jemsek and Ray Jones, two physicians who prescribe long-term antibiotics for chronic Lyme disease, a practice generally recognized to be dangerous and without provable benefit. Jemsek was investigated based on the complaints of 10 patients who described "nightmarish experiences" as a result of his treatment; he was supported by a number of patients and advocacy organizations. The board found that Jemsek had departed from standard medical practice and had failed to inform patients that his treatments were unorthodox; his medical license was suspended with stay, allowing him to continue practicing medicine. Facing a lawsuit from an insurance company, Jemsek declared bankruptcy and closed his medical practice.

The final act of the film focuses on Connecticut Attorney General Richard Blumenthal's antitrust investigation of the IDSA Lyme disease guidelines. Blumenthal issued a press release in May 2008 stating that his investigation "uncovered serious flaws" in the development of the IDSA guidelines, although Blumenthal declined to file any charges. Under pressure of mounting legal fees, the IDSA agreed to submit its Lyme disease guidelines to an independent review, which supported the scientific validity of the IDSA guidelines. The expert panel's review was published in 2010, with the independent doctors and scientists in the panel unanimously endorsing the guidelines, stating "No changes or revisions to the 2006 Lyme guidelines are necessary at this time," and concluding long-term antibiotic treatments are unproven and potentially dangerous. The case was described in Forbes as "intimidation" of the medical community by the Attorney General, and in JAMA as an example of "elected officials advocating for health policies against the weight of scientific evidence."

The film concludes with vignettes of two patients discussing their claimed recoveries.

== Critical reception ==
The New York Times described the film as a "polemic" and "inflammatory." Variety wrote that the film "sides with those advocating unconventional treatments, [but] gives gatekeepers from Infectious Diseases of America [sic, actually Infectious Diseases Society of America] their say." The Baltimore Sun described it as "full of suspicions, assertions, and anecdotes; it’s low on science and objectivity".

According to review aggregation site Rotten Tomatoes, as of December 2019, the film has received 26 positive reviews and 6 negative reviews for a score of 81% positive reviews from the site's approved critics; the average rating is 6.7/10. The critical consensus reads: "A scathing indictment of the American medical system, Under Our Skin is timely, frightening stuff." On Metacritic, it has a rating of 63/100 based on 13 reviews, which the site categorizes as "generally favorable reviews".

== Awards and honors ==
- Finalist, Audience Choice Award, Tribeca Film Festival
- Winner, Best Documentary, Sonoma International Film Festival 2009

== See also ==
- The Quiet Epidemic
