= Stimulation =

Providing something that rouses the recipient to activity

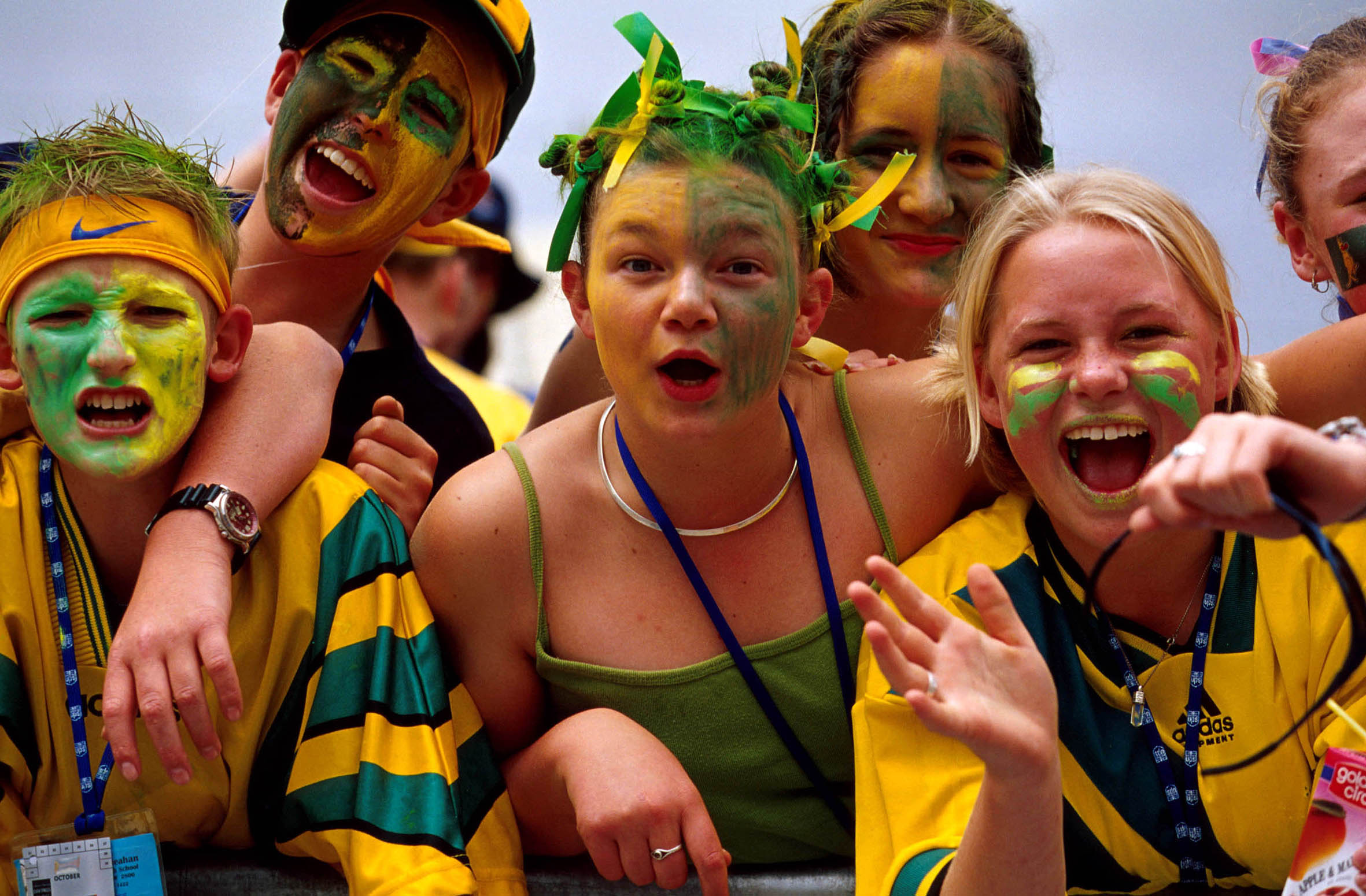
Excited audience members in Australia

Stimulation is the encouragement of development or the cause of activity in general. For example, "The press provides stimulation of political discourse." An engaging activity can be described as "stimulating", regardless of its physical effects on senses. Stimulate means to act as a stimulus to; stimulus means something that rouses the recipient to activity; stimuli is the plural of stimulus.

A particular use of the term is physiological stimulation, which refers to sensory excitation, the action of various agents or forms of energy (stimuli) on receptors that generate impulses that travel through nerves to the brain (afferents). There are sensory receptors on or near the surface of the body, such as photoreceptors in the retina of the eye, hair cells in the cochlea of the ear, touch receptors in the skin and chemical receptors in the mouth and nasal cavity. There are also sensory receptors in the muscles, joints, digestive tract, and membranes around organs such as the brain, the abdominal cavity, the bladder and the prostate (providing one source of sexual stimulation). Stimulation to the external or internal senses may evoke involuntary activity or guide intentions in action. Such emotional or motivating stimulation typically is also experienced subjectively (enters awareness, is in consciousness). Perception can be regarded as conceptualised stimulation, used in reasoning and intending, for example. When bodily stimulation is perceived, it is traditionally called a sensation, such as a kind of touch or a taste or smell, or a painful or pleasurable sensation. This can be thought of as psychological stimulation, which is a stimulus affecting a person's thinking or feeling processes.

== Overview ==
Stimulation, in general, refers to how organisms perceive incoming stimuli. As such it is part of the stimulus-response mechanism. Simple organisms broadly react in three ways to stimulation: too little stimulation causes them to stagnate, too much to die from stress or inability to adapt, and a medium amount causes them to adapt and grow as they overcome it. Similar categories or effects are noted with psychological stress with people. Thus, stimulation may be described as how external events provoke a response by an individual in the attempt to cope.

== Over-stimulation ==
It is possible to become habituated to a particular degree of stimulation, then find it uncomfortable to depart from that level of stimulation. This can be especially acute on social media platforms that use algorithms to maximize screen time. One can become used to intense stimuli or a fast-paced life and suffer withdrawal symptoms when they are removed. Stress, unhappiness, or anxiety may result from an unaccustomed level of stimulation.

Ongoing, long-term stimulation can prove harmful, and a more relaxed and less stimulated life may be beneficial despite possible initial discomfort or stress from the change. See also Sensory overload and Burnout.

Chiropractor James Wilson has hypothesized that long-term overstimulation can result eventually in a phenomenon called adrenal fatigue, but there is no evidence that such a condition exists.

== See also ==
- Psychomotor agitation
- Stress management
