= List of diagnoses characterized as pseudoscience =

Pseudomedical diagnosis
- Risks: Nocebo

Many proposed diseases and diagnoses are rejected by mainstream medical consensus and are associated with pseudoscience due to a lack of scientific evidence for their existence, proposed mechanism or action, or manifestation that cannot be explained by something else.

== Definition ==
Pseudoscientific diseases are not defined using objective criteria. Such diseases cannot achieve, and perhaps do not seek, medical recognition. Pseudoscience rejects empirical methodology.

Other conditions may be rejected or contested by orthodox medicine, but are not necessarily associated with pseudoscience. Diagnostic criteria for some of these conditions may be vague, over-inclusive, or otherwise ill-defined. Although the evidence for the disease may be contested or lacking, the justification for these diagnoses is nevertheless empirical and therefore amenable to scientific investigation, at least in theory.

In some cases, patients are exhibiting genuine signs and symptoms but the explanation or diagnosis for their distress is disputed or inaccurate.

Examples of conditions that are not necessarily pseudoscientific include:

- Conditions determined to be somatic in nature, including mass psychogenic illnesses.
- Medicalized conditions that are not pathogenic in nature, such as aging, childbirth, pregnancy, sexual addiction, baldness, jet lag, and halitosis.
- Conditions that are not widely recognized, about which there is an ongoing debate within the scientific and medical literature.
- Functional disorders are a set of conditions that cannot be explained by structural or biochemical abnormalities. These raise challenges around diagnosis and treatment, with debate around whether they are psychogenic. They often present with non-specific symptoms that are consistent with multiple causes.

== Medical ==
- Adrenal fatigue or hypoadrenia is a diagnosis described as a state in which the adrenal glands are exhausted and unable to produce adequate quantities of hormones, primarily the glucocorticoid cortisol, due to chronic stress or infections. Adrenal fatigue should not be confused with a number of actual forms of adrenal dysfunction such as adrenal insufficiency or Addison's disease. The term "adrenal fatigue", which was invented in 1998 by James Wilson, a chiropractor, may be applied to a collection of mostly nonspecific symptoms. There is no scientific evidence supporting the concept of adrenal fatigue and it is not recognized as a diagnosis by any scientific or medical community. A systematic review found no evidence for the term adrenal fatigue, confirming the consensus among endocrinological societies that it is a myth.
- Autistic enterocolitis is a nonexistent medical condition proposed in 1998 by now-discredited British gastroenterologist Andrew Wakefield, who suggested a link between a number of common clinical symptoms and signs which he contended were distinctive to autism. The existence of such an enterocolitis has been dismissed by experts as having "not been established". Wakefield's fraudulent report, which was retracted in 2010, suppressed negative findings and used inadequate controls. Multiple attempts to replicate his results have been unsuccessful. Reviews in the medical literature have found no link between autism and bowel disease.
- Candida hypersensitivity is the spuriously claimed chronic yeast infections responsible for many common disorders and non-specific symptoms, such as fatigue, weight gain, constipation, dizziness, muscle and joint pain, and asthma. The notion has been strongly disabused by the American Academy of Allergy, Asthma, and Immunology.
- Chronic Lyme disease is a generally rejected diagnosis that encompasses "a broad array of illnesses or symptom complexes for which there is no reproducible or convincing scientific evidence of any relationship to Borrelia burgdorferi infection." This is different from Lyme disease, which is a known medical condition. Despite numerous studies, there is no clinical evidence that "chronic" Lyme disease is caused by a persistent infection. It is distinct from post-treatment Lyme disease syndrome, a set of lingering symptoms which may persist after successful treatment of infection with Lyme spirochetes. The symptoms of "chronic Lyme" are generic and non-specific "symptoms of life".
- Electromagnetic hypersensitivity is a reported sensitivity to electric and magnetic fields or electromagnetic radiation of various frequencies at exposure levels well below established safety standards. Symptoms are inconsistent, but can include headache, fatigue, difficulty sleeping, as well as similar non-specific indications. Provocation studies find that the discomfort of sufferers is unrelated to hidden sources of radiation, and "no scientific basis currently exists for a connection between EHS and exposure to [electromagnetic fields]."
- Excited delirium, originally identified by pathologist Charles Wetli to account for the deaths of nineteen Black prostitutes due to "sexual excitement" while under the influence of cocaine; the women later turned out to be victims of a serial killer. The condition is primarily found in people under police restraint, especially after being tasered, and, while it is not in the ICD-10 or DSM-5, it is promoted by a number of doctors, many of whom are on the payroll of Axon, the manufacturer of the Taser.
- Leaky gut syndrome is an alleged condition caused by the passage of harmful substances outward through the gut wall. Alternative medicine proponents claim it is the cause of many conditions including multiple sclerosis and autism, a claim which has been called pseudoscientific. According to the UK National Health Service, the theory is vague and unproven. Some skeptics and scientists say that the marketing of treatments for leaky gut syndrome is either misguided or an instance of deliberate health fraud.
- Morgellons is a self-diagnosed, unexplained skin condition in which individuals have sores that they believe contain some kind of fibers. Morgellons is poorly characterized but the general medical consensus is that it is a form of delusional parasitosis. An attempt to link Morgellons to the cause of Lyme disease has been attacked by Steven Salzberg as "dangerous pseudoscience".
- Multiple chemical sensitivity is an unrecognized controversial diagnosis characterized by chronic symptoms attributed to exposure to low levels of commonly used chemicals. Symptoms are typically vague and non-specific. They may include fatigue, headaches, nausea, and dizziness.
- Rope worms
- Shoenfeld's syndrome, a hypothesised autoimmune disorder proposed by Israeli immunologist Yehuda Shoenfeld. There is a lack of reproducible evidence for this syndrome, refuting its existence. In addition, supporting data from animal models are flawed.
- Traditional Chinese medicine diagnoses, such as imbalances in yin and yang and blockages in the flow of qi
- "Vaccine overload", a non-medical term for the notion that giving many vaccines at once may overwhelm or weaken a child's immature immune system and lead to adverse effects, is strongly contradicted by scientific evidence.
- Vertebral subluxation is a chiropractic diagnosis that involves a site of impaired flow of innate or a spinal lesion that is postulated to cause neuromusculoskeletal or visceral dysfunction. Scientific consensus does not support the existence of chiropractic's vertebral subluxation.
- Wilson's syndrome (not to be confused with Wilson's disease) is an alternative medicine concept, not recognized as a legitimate diagnosis in evidence-based medicine. Its supporters describe Wilson's syndrome as a mix of common and non-specific symptoms which they attribute to low body temperature and impaired conversion of thyroxine (T4) to triiodothyronine (T3), despite normal thyroid function tests. The American Thyroid Association (ATA) says Wilson's syndrome is at odds with established knowledge of thyroid function, has vague diagnostic criteria, and lacks supporting scientific evidence. The ATA further raised concern that the proposed treatments were potentially harmful.
- Wind turbine syndrome is a proposed connection between adverse health effects and proximity to wind turbines. Proponents have claimed that these effects include death, cancer, and congenital abnormality. The distribution of recorded events, however, correlates with media coverage of wind farm syndrome itself, and not with the presence or absence of wind farms. Reviews of the scientific literature have consistently found no reason to believe that wind turbines are harmful to health.

== Psychological ==
- Autogynephilia is a proposed paraphilic disorder in which a man has erotic interest in the idea of himself in the form of a woman. Autogynephilia is not recognized by any major medical organization and has been criticised as a form of medical transphobia.
- Drapetomania was a supposed mental illness that, in 1851, American physician Samuel A. Cartwright hypothesized as the cause of enslaved Africans fleeing captivity. This hypothesis centered around the belief that slavery was such an improvement upon the lives of slaves that only those suffering from some form of mental illness would wish to escape. As treatment Cartwright recommended "whipping the devil out of them" both as a punishment and as a preventative measure.
- Female hysteria was once a common medical diagnosis for women, which was described as exhibiting a wide array of symptoms, including anxiety, shortness of breath, fainting, nervousness, sexual desire, insomnia, fluid retention, heaviness in the abdomen, irritability, loss of appetite for food or sex, (paradoxically) sexually forward behaviour, and a "tendency to cause trouble for others". It is no longer recognized by medical authorities as a medical disorder.
- Parental alienation syndrome, also routinely referred to as parental alienation is a proposed mental health disorder in which a child expresses hostility or aversion to a parent as an effect of the manipulation of another parent. Given an absence of research-based support for its existence, parental alienation syndrome is not recognized as a mental health disorder by the American Psychiatric Association, American Psychological Association, American Medical Association or World Health Organization. Despite the fact it is frequently referenced as a defense strategy in family courts where parents, disproportionately fathers, are accused of domestic violence or coercive control, it does not meet the scientific standards demanded by legal tests such as the Frye test and Daubert standard for admissibility in the United States legal system.
- Pathological demand avoidance is a proposed disorder characterised by avoidance of everyday demands. It was proposed by British psychologist Elizabeth Newsom in 1983 for children who did not then meet the criteria for autism and which she felt shared certain other characteristics, such as an interest in pretend play. Largely ignored until recently, especially outside the UK, it's seen a surge in interest from parents due to social media. According to one paper, there is insufficient evidence to support it as an independent diagnosis. Alternative diagnoses to PDA include ADHD, generalised anxiety disorder, autism spectrum condition, attachment disorder, and oppositional defiance disorder; in some cases, autism is diagnosed, "with PDA profile."
- Rapid-onset gender dysphoria is a proposed condition in which someone develops gender dysphoria due to social contagion. The term originates from a 2018 study which surveyed parents of transgender people from anti-transgender internet forums. While the American Psychological Association and the American Psychiatric Association cosigned a statement with 120 other medical organizations calling for rapid-onset gender dysphoria to not be used in clinical settings, the term is still used by anti-trans groups.
- Reward deficiency syndrome (RDS) is a term that has been applied to a wide variety of addictive, obsessive and compulsive behaviors including substance and process addictions, and personality and spectrum disorders. There is no consistent evidence to validate any such syndrome. "Reward deficiency syndrome" is not a medically recognized disorder. The diagnostic validity of RDS has not been recognized by the American Psychiatric Association in its diagnostic manual, the DSM.
- Sluggish schizophrenia is a proposed form of slow-onset schizophrenia that political dissenters were institutionalised for in communist countries. It was diagnosed in people with no hallucinations or delusions under the assumption that they would appear later.
- Stendhal syndrome is a proposed condition in which someone experiences rapid heartbeat, fainting, confusion, and even hallucinations when exposed to works of beauty.
- Stockholm syndrome is a proposed condition in which a hostage develops an emotional bond with their kidnapper while in captivity. Stockholm syndrome is considered a contested illness and is not recognized in the DSM.

== See also ==
- List of topics characterized as pseudoscience § Health and medicine
- List of questionable diagnostic tests
- List of fictional diseases
- Culture-bound syndrome
- Medically unexplained physical symptoms
- Quackery
