= Cortisol cocktail =

Beverage promoted for stress relief

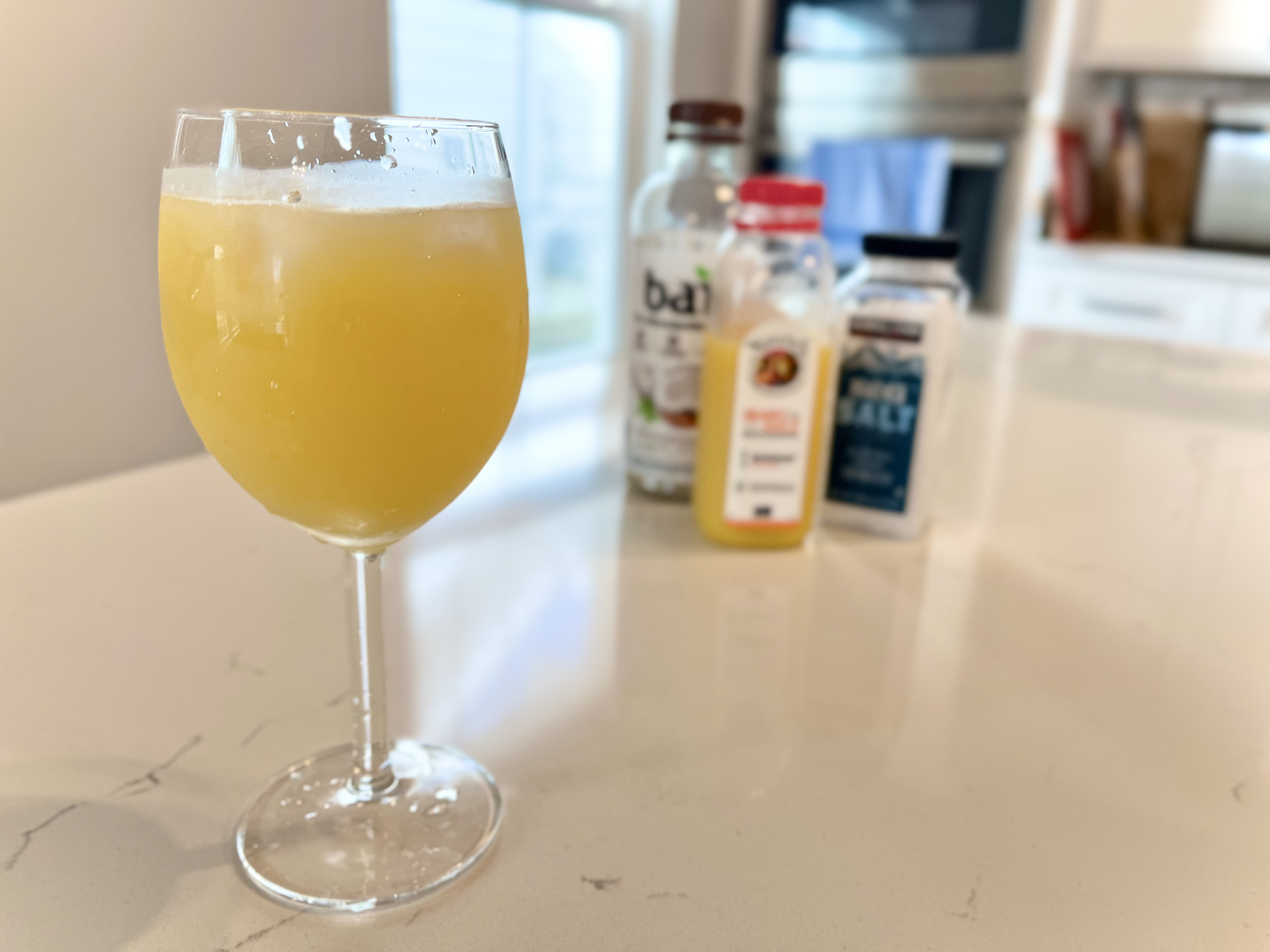
Cortisol cocktail

The cortisol cocktail (also known as an adrenal cocktail) is a drink popularized on social media, typically promoted for stress relief and to combat the pseudoscientific concept of adrenal fatigue. The drink became viral on TikTok in 2023, and proponents purported the drink could lower levels of the stress hormone cortisol, as well as restoring energy and relieving tension. There is a lack of evidence to support these claims. Despite being called a cocktail, it is non-alcoholic.

== Ingredients ==
Recipes for the cortisol cocktail generally include:

- Fruit juice (commonly orange and variably with lemon juice)
- Coconut water
- Salt
- Magnesium powder (optional)
- Cream of tartar (optional)
- Sparkling water (optional)

Proponents claim that the vitamin C from fruit juice, potassium from coconut water, and sodium from sea salt help to replenish nutrients supposedly lost due to stress, thereby addressing "adrenal fatigue."

== Scientific consensus ==
"Adrenal fatigue" is not a recognized medical condition amongst medical experts, as the adrenal glands do not lose their ability to secrete hormones in healthy individuals due to stress. While a rare condition called adrenal insufficiency (when the body doesn't produce enough cortisol) does exist, it is typically caused by autoimmune disorders or pituitary gland problems, not by a stressful lifestyle. It is diagnosed by measuring blood cortisol levels. There are no scientific studies supporting the claims that cortisol cocktails eliminate fatigue or stress.

While potassium, sodium, and vitamin C are essential nutrients, a balanced diet typically provides sufficient amounts. Many common fruits and vegetables, such as citrus fruits, mangoes, broccoli, bananas, avocados, and sweet potatoes, are rich in these nutrients. Most people already consume adequate sodium.

Occasional consumption of a cortisol cocktail is generally not harmful. However, it may be high in sodium or sugar which may cause health issues in excess. For instance, people with diabetes mellitus should be aware of the sugar content that comes from the juice.
