= Wilson's temperature syndrome =

Contested form of thyroid deficiency in alternative medicine circles

Pseudomedical diagnosis
- Risks: Nocebo

Wilson's temperature syndrome, also called Wilson's syndrome, Wilson's thyroid syndrome or WTS, is a term used in alternative medicine to improperly attribute various common and non-specific symptoms to abnormally low body temperature and impaired conversion of thyroxine (T4) to triiodothyronine (T3), despite normal thyroid function tests. E. Denis Wilson, a physician who invented the concept and named it after himself, treated these symptoms with sustained-release triiodothyronine (SR-T3) until one of his patients died and he was banned from prescribing this treatment any longer.

Wilson's syndrome is not an actual medical condition, and medical expert groups have warned against it as a potentially dangerous misunderstanding of physiology. The American Thyroid Association (ATA) released an official statement asserting that Wilson's syndrome is at odds with established knowledge of thyroid function and describing the diagnostic criteria for Wilson's syndrome as "imprecise" and "non-specific".

After one of Wilson's patients died from his treatment in 1988, Florida State Medical Board members described Wilson's temperature syndrome as a "phony syndrome" and as a scam that fleeced patients and healthcare insurers during disciplinary action against Wilson, whose medical license was suspended for six months.

== Origin and claims ==
The term Wilson’s syndrome was coined in 1990 by E. Denis Wilson, a physician practicing in Longwood, Florida. He claimed that fatigue, headaches, PMS, hair loss, irritability, fluid retention, depression, decreased memory, low sex drive, unhealthy nails, and easy weight gain were manifestation of this eponymous syndrome. Wilson claims that it is one of "the most common of all chronic ailments and probably takes a greater toll on society than any other medical condition."

He claimed that low thyroid symptoms and low body temperatures in the presence of normal thyroid function tests are common. To distinguish his alternative concept from conventional, evidence-based hypothyroidism, he named his concept Wilson's (temperature) syndrome. The main diagnostic sign is an oral body temperature that averages well below 37.0 °C (98.6 °F). This overlaps with normal body temperature, which is usually within the range of 36.5–37.5 °C (97.7–99.5 °F). Wilson says that his diagnosis is confirmed if the patient responds to treatment with slow-release T3 (SR-T3).

== Patient death and medical license suspension ==
In 1988, one of Wilson’s patients died at the age of 50 from an arrhythmia and heart attack after ingesting excessive amounts of oral thyroid hormone.

Four years later, in 1992, the Florida Board of Medicine took disciplinary action against Wilson, accusing him of "fleecing" patients with a "phony diagnosis" and dangerous treatments. The Board of Medicine and Wilson settled the disciplinary action, agreeing to a 6-month suspension of Wilson's medical license, after which Wilson would need to attend 100 hours of continuing medical education, submit to psychological testing, and pay a $10,000 fine before resuming practice. Wilson also agreed not to prescribe thyroid medication to anyone unless the Board of Medicine determined that the medical community had accepted Wilson's concept and treatment as valid.

== See also ==
- Broda Otto Barnes, another physician who made similar claims
