= Endocrine (journal) =

- Discipline: Endocrinology
- Language: English

Publication details
- Former name(s): Endocrine Journal
- History: 1993-present
- Publisher: Springer Science+Business Media
- Frequency: 9/year
- Impact factor: 3.878 (2014)

Standard abbreviations
- ISO 4: Endocrine

Indexing
- ISSN: 1355-008X (print); 1559-0100 (web)
- OCLC no.: 750583395

Links
- Journal homepage; Online archive

Endocrine (subtitle: International Journal of Basic and Clinical Endocrinology) is a peer-reviewed medical journal covering endocrinology. It was established in 1993 as the Endocrine Journal, and obtained its current name the following year. The editor-in-chief is Sebastiano Filetti (Sapienza University of Rome). According to the Journal Citation Reports, the journal has a 2014 impact factor of 3.878.
