= Quackery =

Promotion of fraudulent or ignorant medical practices

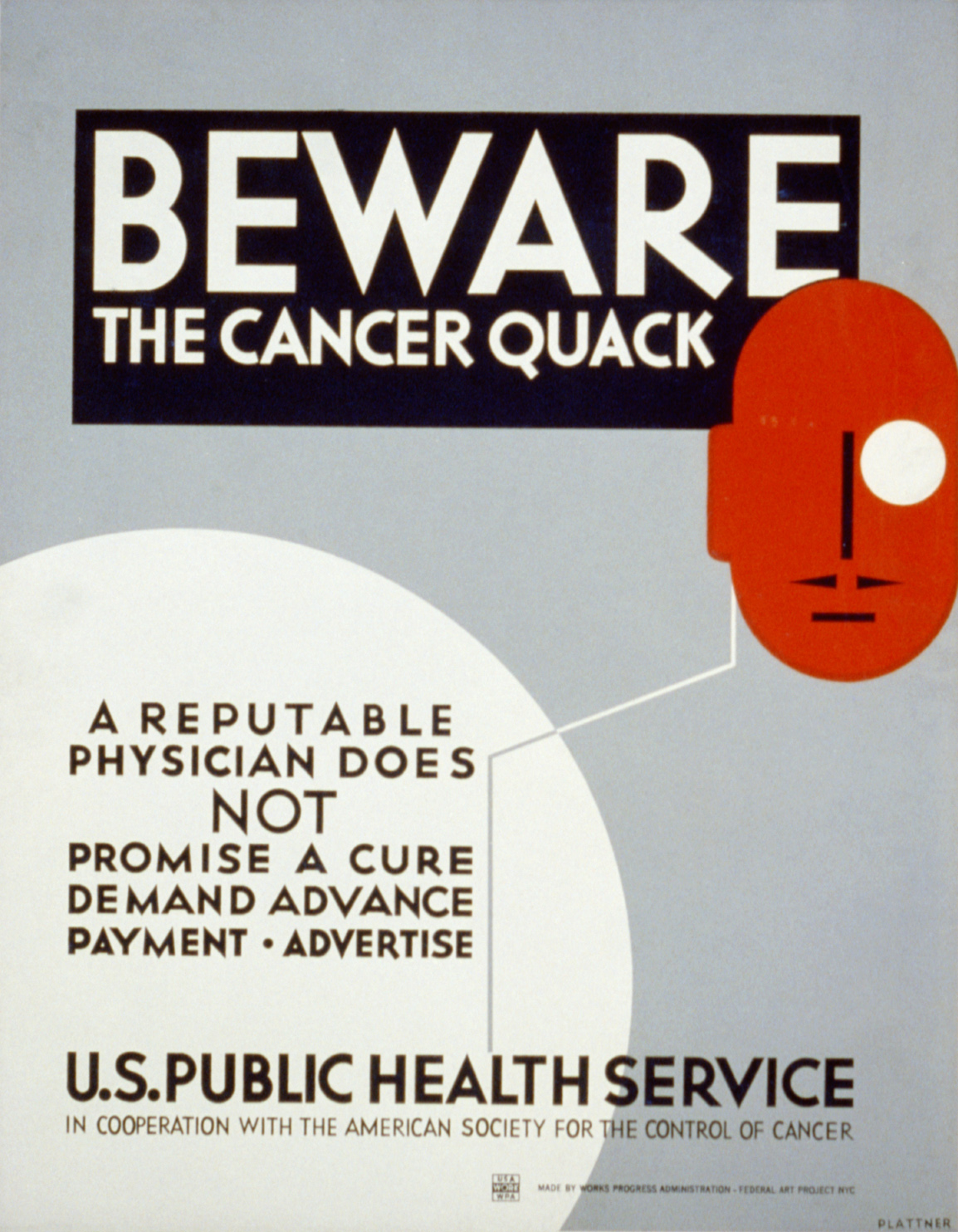
WPA poster, 1936–38

Quackery, often synonymous with health fraud, is the promotion of fraudulent or ignorant medical practices. A quack is a "fraudulent or ignorant pretender to medical skill" or "a person who pretends, professionally or publicly, to have skill, knowledge, qualification or credentials they do not possess; a charlatan or snake oil salesman". The term quack is a clipped form of the archaic term quacksalver, derived from Dutch: kwakzalver a "hawker of salve" or rather somebody who boasted about their salves, more commonly known as ointments. In the Middle Ages the term quack meant "shouting". The quacksalvers sold their wares at markets by shouting to gain attention.

Common elements of general quackery include questionable diagnoses using questionable diagnostic tests, as well as untested or refuted treatments, especially for serious diseases such as cancer. Quackery is often described as "health fraud" with the salient characteristic of aggressive promotion.

== Definition ==
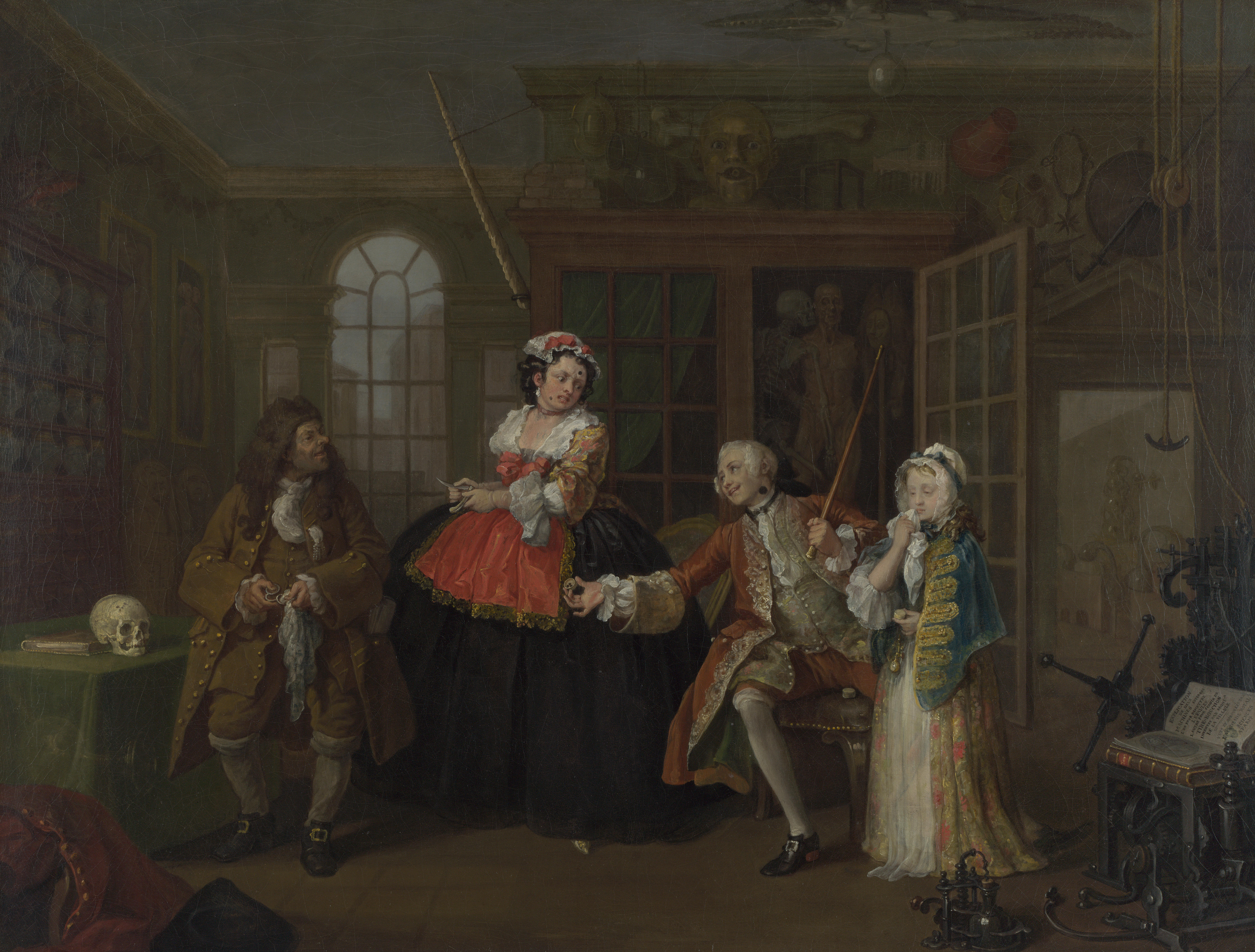
William Hogarth's The Inspection, the third canvas in his Marriage à-la-mode (The Visit to the Quack Doctor)

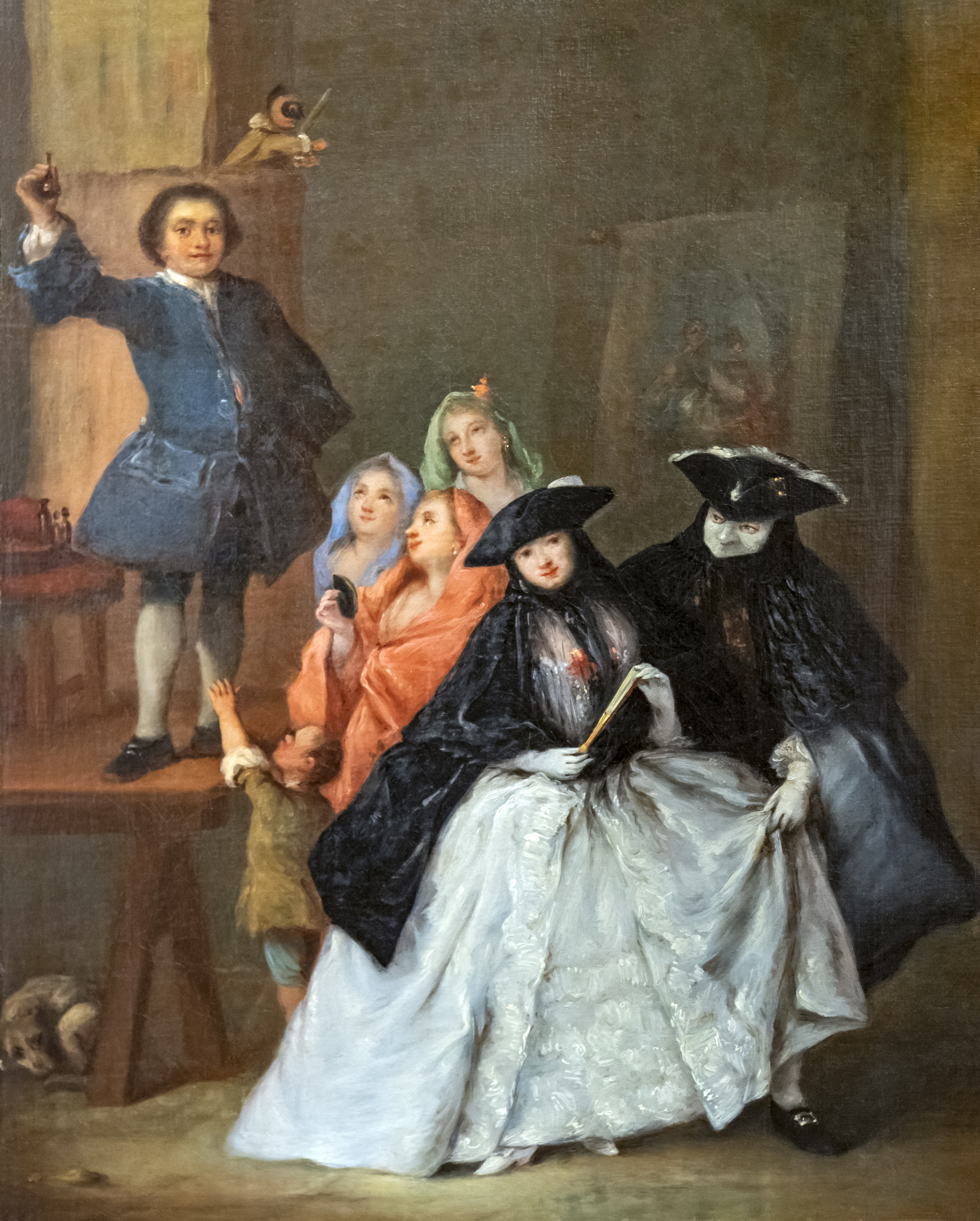
Pietro Longhi's The Charlatan (1757)

Psychiatrist and author Stephen Barrett of Quackwatch defines quackery as "the promotion of unsubstantiated methods that lack a scientifically plausible rationale" and more broadly as:

"anything involving overpromotion in the field of health." This definition would include questionable ideas as well as questionable products and services, regardless of the sincerity of their promoters. In line with this definition, the word "fraud" would be reserved only for situations in which deliberate deception is involved.

In addition to the ethical problems of promising benefits that are not likely to occur, quackery might cause people to forego treatments that are more likely to help them, in favor of ineffective treatments given by the "quack".

American pediatrician Paul Offit has proposed four ways in which alternative medicine "becomes quackery":

1. "by recommending against conventional therapies that are helpful."
2. "by promoting potentially harmful therapies without adequate warning."
3. "by draining patients' bank accounts ..."
4. "by promoting magical thinking ..."

Since it is difficult to distinguish between those who knowingly promote unproven medical therapies and those who are mistaken as to their effectiveness, United States courts have ruled in defamation cases that accusing someone of quackery or calling a practitioner a quack is not equivalent to accusing that person of committing medical fraud. However, the FDA makes little distinction between the two. To be considered a fraud, it is not strictly necessary for one to know they are misrepresenting the benefits or risks of the services offered.

== Quacksalver ==
Unproven, usually ineffective, and sometimes dangerous medicines and treatments have been peddled throughout human history. Theatrical performances were sometimes given to enhance the credibility of purported medicines. Grandiose claims were made for what could be humble materials indeed: for example, in the mid-19th century revalenta arabica was advertised as having extraordinary restorative virtues as an empirical diet for invalids; despite its impressive name and many glowing testimonials it was in truth only ordinary lentil flour, sold to the gullible at many times the true cost.

Even where no fraud was intended, quack remedies often contained no effective ingredients whatsoever. Some remedies contained substances such as opium, alcohol and honey, which would have given symptomatic relief but had no curative properties. Some would have addictive qualities to entice the buyer to return. The few effective remedies sold by quacks included emetics, laxatives and diuretics. Some ingredients did have medicinal effects: mercury, silver and arsenic compounds may have helped some infections and infestations; willow bark contains salicylic acid, chemically closely related to aspirin; and the quinine contained in Jesuit's bark was an effective treatment for malaria and other fevers. However, knowledge of appropriate uses and dosages was limited.

== Criticism of quackery in academia ==
The evidence-based medicine community has criticized the infiltration of alternative medicine into mainstream academic medicine, education, and publications, accusing institutions of "diverting research time, money, and other resources from more fruitful lines of investigation in order to pursue a theory that has no basis in biology."

For example, David Gorski criticized Brian M. Berman, founder of the University of Maryland Center for Integrative Medicine, for writing that "There [is] evidence that both real acupuncture and sham acupuncture [are] more effective than no treatment and that acupuncture can be a useful supplement to other forms of conventional therapy for low back pain." He also castigated editors and peer reviewers at the New England Journal of Medicine for allowing it to be published, since it effectively recommended deliberately misleading patients in order to achieve a known placebo effect.

== History in Europe and the United States ==
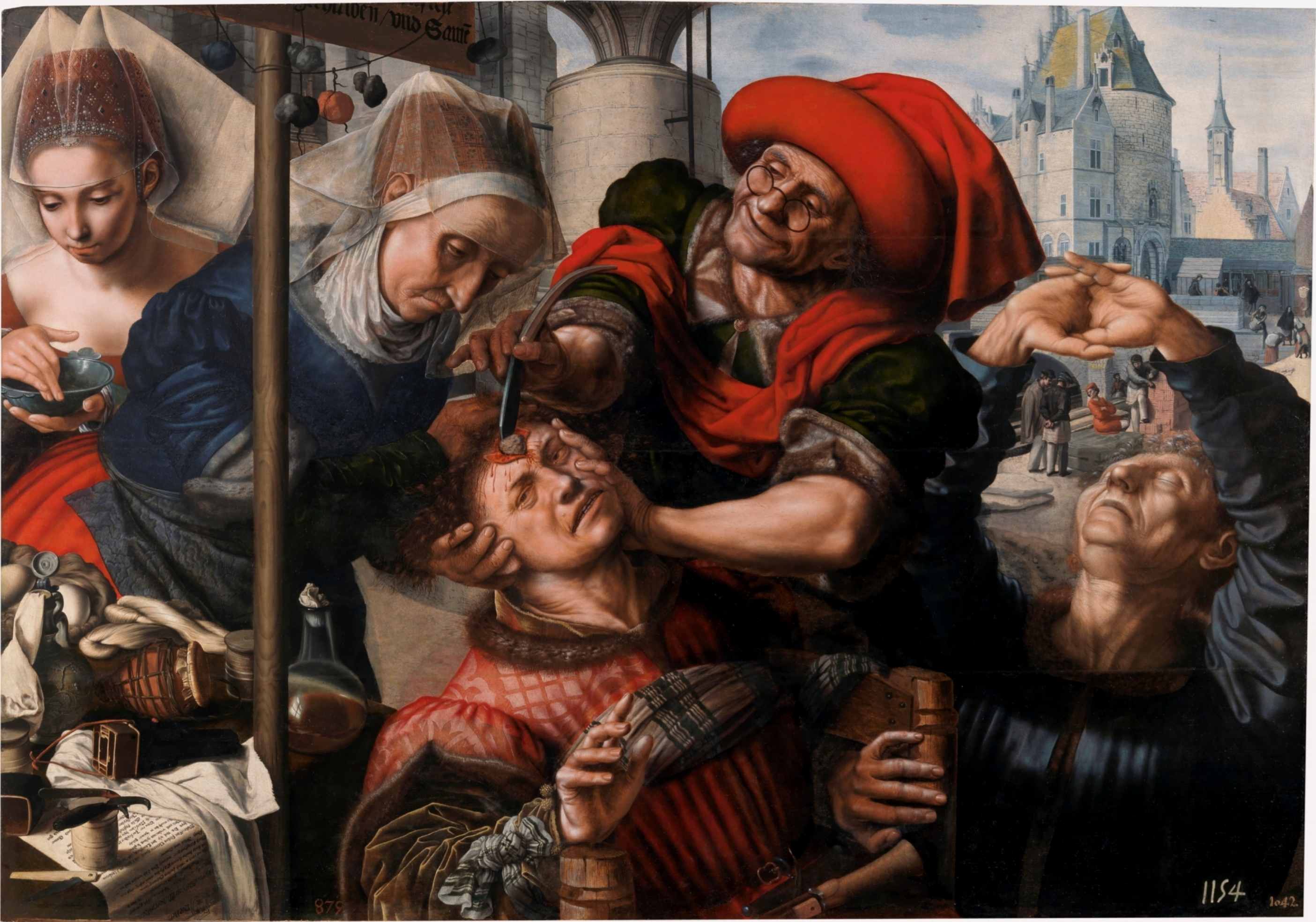
The Surgeon by Jan Sanders van Hemessen (1555)

With little understanding of the causes and mechanisms of illnesses, widely marketed "cures" (as opposed to locally produced and locally used remedies), often referred to as patent medicines, first came to prominence during the 17th and 18th centuries in Britain and the British colonies, including those in North America. Daffy's Elixir and Turlington's Balsam were among the first products that used branding (e.g. using highly distinctive containers) and mass marketing to create and maintain markets. A similar process occurred in other countries of Europe around the same time, for example with the marketing of Eau de Cologne as a cure-all medicine by Johann Maria Farina and his imitators. Patent medicines often contained alcohol or opium, which, while presumably not curing the diseases for which they were sold as a remedy, did make the imbibers feel better and confusedly appreciative of the product.

The number of internationally marketed quack medicines increased in the later 18th century; the majority of them originated in Britain and were exported throughout the British Empire. By 1830, British parliamentary records list over 1,300 different "proprietary medicines", the majority of which were "quack" cures by modern standards.

A Dutch organisation that opposes quackery, Vereniging tegen de Kwakzalverij (VtdK), was founded in 1881, making it the oldest organisation of this kind in the world. It has published its magazine Nederlands Tijdschrift tegen de Kwakzalverij (Dutch Magazine against Quackery) ever since. In these early years the VtdK played a part in the professionalisation of medicine. Its efforts in the public debate helped to make the Netherlands one of the first countries with governmental drug regulation.

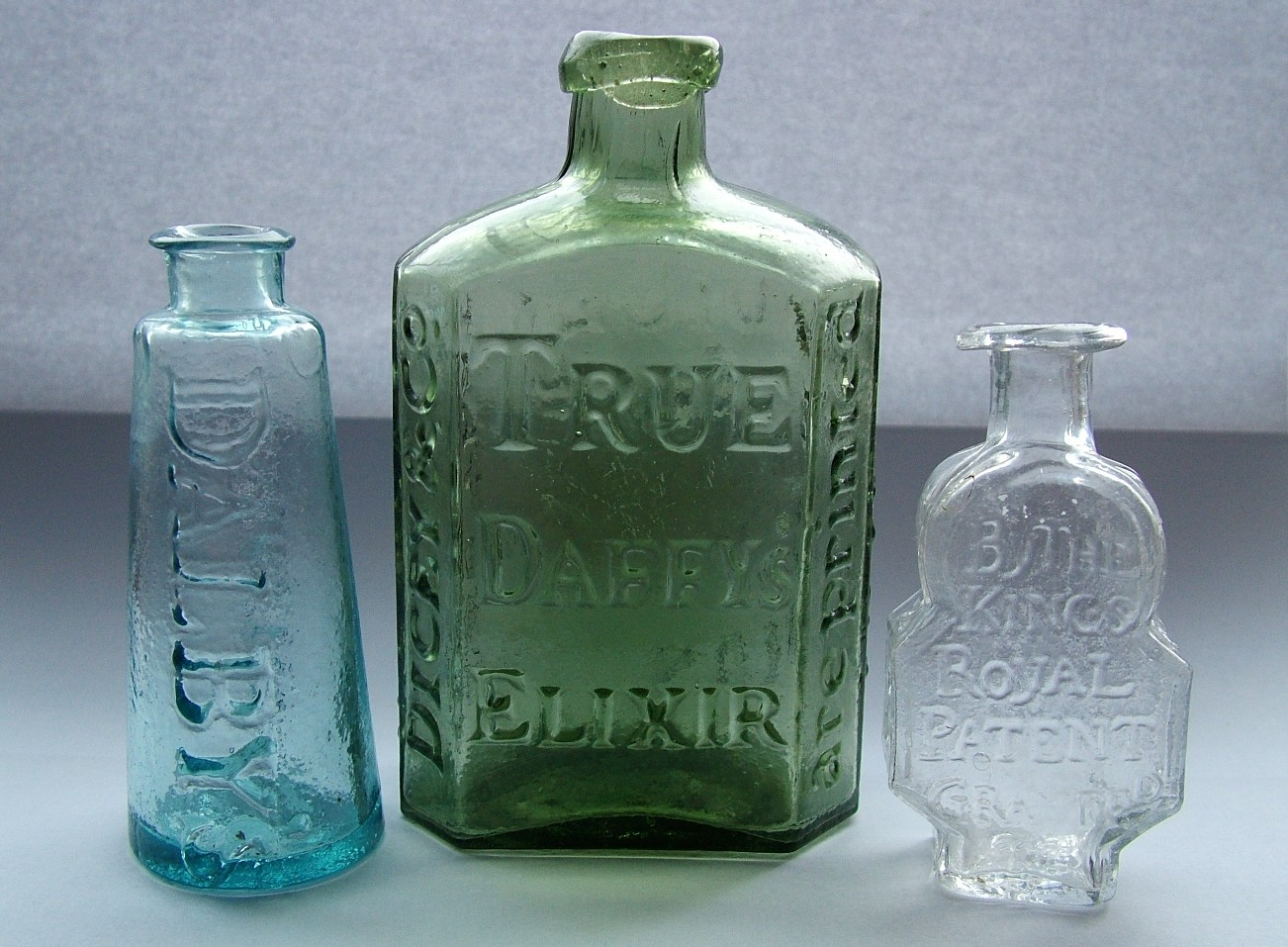
Dalby's Carminative, Daffy's Elixir and Turlington's Balsam of Life bottles dating to the late 18th and early 19th centuries. These "typical" patent or quack medicines were marketed in very different, and highly distinctive, bottles. Each brand retained the same basic appearance for more than 100 years.

In 1909, in an attempt to stop the sale of quack medicines, the British Medical Association published Secret Remedies, What They Cost And What They Contain. (Note: The British Medical Association estimated that, based on ad valorem tax revenues from patent medicines for the fiscal year ending 31 March 1908, the British public spent about £2.42 million on patent medicines. This is equivalent to about £182 million ($250 million) in 2014.) This publication was originally a series of articles published in the British Medical Journal between 1904 and 1909. The publication was composed of 20 chapters, organising the work by sections according to the ailments the medicines claimed to treat. Each remedy was tested thoroughly, the preface stated: "Of the accuracy of the analytical data there can be no question; the investigation has been carried out with great care by a skilled analytical chemist." The book did lead to the end of some of the quack cures, but some survived the book by several decades. For example, Beecham's Pills, which according to the British Medical Association contained in 1909 only aloes, ginger and soap, but claimed to cure 31 medical conditions, were sold until 1998. The failure of the medical establishment to stop quackery was rooted in the difficulty of defining what precisely distinguished real medicine, and in the appeals that quackery held out to consumers.

British patent medicines lost their dominance in the United States when they were denied access to the Thirteen Colonies markets during the American Revolution, and lost further ground for the same reason during the War of 1812. From the early 19th century "home-grown" American brands started to fill the gap, reaching their peak in the years after the American Civil War. British medicines never regained their previous dominance in North America, and the subsequent era of mass marketing of American patent medicines is usually considered to have been a "golden age" of quackery in the United States. This was mirrored by similar growth in marketing of quack medicines elsewhere in the world.

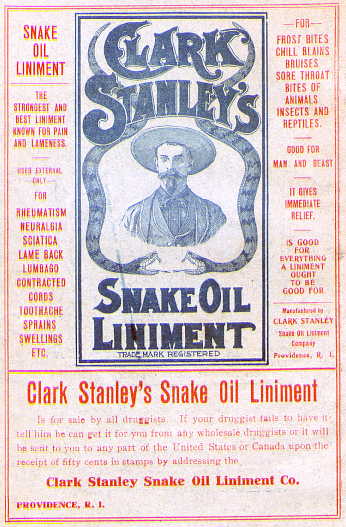
Clark Stanley's Snake Oil

In the United States, false medicines in this era were often denoted by the slang term snake oil, a reference to sales pitches for the false medicines that claimed exotic ingredients provided the supposed benefits. Those who sold them were called "snake oil salesmen", and usually sold their medicines with a fervent pitch similar to a fire and brimstone religious sermon. They often accompanied other theatrical and entertainment productions that traveled as a road show from town to town, leaving quickly before the falseness of their medicine was discovered. Not all quacks were restricted to such small-time businesses however, and a number, especially in the United States, became enormously wealthy through national and international sales of their products.

In 1875, the Pacific Medical and Surgical Journal complained:

If Satan has ever succeeded in compressing a greater amount of concentrated mendacity into one set of human bodies above every other description, it is in the advertising quacks. The coolness and deliberation with which they announce the most glaring falsehoods are really appalling. A recent arrival in San Francisco, whose name might indicate that he had his origin in the Pontine marshes of Europe, announces himself as the "Late examining physician of the Massachusetts Infirmary, Boston." This fellow has the impudence to publish that his charge to physicians in their own cases is $5.00! Another genius in Philadelphia, of the bogus diploma breed, who claims to have founded a new system of practice and who calls himself a "Professor," advertises two elixers of his own make, one of which is for "all male diseases" and the other for "all female diseases"! In the list of preparations which this wretch advertises for sale as the result of his own labors and discoveries, is ozone!

— Pacific Medical and Surgical Journal Reprinted in the Boston Medical And Surgical Journal, vol. 91, p. 373

One among many examples is William Radam, a German immigrant to the US, who, in the 1880s, started to sell his "Microbe Killer" throughout the United States and, soon afterwards, in Britain and throughout the British colonies. His concoction was widely advertised as being able to "cure all diseases", and this phrase was even embossed on the glass bottles the medicine was sold in. In fact, Radam's medicine was a therapeutically useless (and in large quantities actively poisonous) dilute solution of sulfuric acid, coloured with a little red wine. Radam's publicity material, particularly his books, provide an insight into the role that pseudoscience played in the development and marketing of "quack" medicines towards the end of the 19th century.

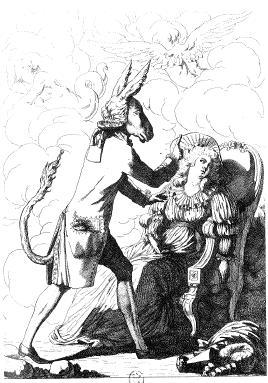
Cartoon depicting a quack doctor using hypnotism (1780, France)

Advertising claims similar to those of Radam can be found throughout the 18th, 19th, 20th and 21st centuries. "Dr." Sibley, an English patent medicine seller of the late 18th and early 19th centuries, even went so far as to claim that his Reanimating Solar Tincture would, as the name implies, "restore life in the event of sudden death". Another English quack, "Dr. Solomon" claimed that his Cordial Balm of Gilead cured almost anything, but was particularly effective against all venereal complaints, from gonorrhea to onanism. Although it was basically just brandy flavoured with herbs, the price of a bottle was a half guinea (£sd system) in 1800, (Note: The price of a bottle of Cordial Balm of Gilead was 33 shillings in the period of the Napoleonic wars, equivalent to over £92 ($126) in 2014.) equivalent to over £28 ($38) in 2014.

Not all patent medicines were without merit. Turlingtons Balsam of Life, first marketed in the mid-18th century, did have genuinely beneficial properties. This medicine continued to be sold under the original name into the early 20th century, and can still be found in the British and American pharmacopoeias as "Compound tincture of benzoin". In these cases, the treatments likely lacked empirical support when they were introduced to the market, and their benefits were simply a convenient coincidence discovered after the fact.

The end of the road for the quack medicines now considered grossly fraudulent in the nations of North America and Europe came in the early 20th century. 21 February 1906 saw the passage into law of the Pure Food and Drug Act in the United States. This was the result of decades of campaigning by both government departments and the medical establishment, supported by a number of publishers and journalists (one of the most effective was Samuel Hopkins Adams, who wrote "The Great American Fraud" series in Collier's in 1905). This American Act was followed three years later by similar legislation in Britain and in other European nations. Between them, these laws began to remove the more outrageously dangerous contents from patent and proprietary medicines, and to force quack medicine proprietors to stop making some of their more blatantly dishonest claims. The Act, however, left advertising and claims of effectiveness unregulated as the Supreme Court interpreted it to mean only that ingredients on labels had to be accurate. Language in the 1912 Sherley Amendment, meant to close this loophole, was limited to regulating claims that were false and fraudulent, creating the need to show intent. Throughout the early 20th century, the American Medical Association collected material on medical quackery, and one of their members and medical editors in particular, Arthur J. Cramp, devoted his career to criticizing such products. The AMA's Department of Investigation closed in 1975, but their only archive open to non-members remains, the American Medical Association Health Fraud and Alternative Medicine Collection.

"Medical quackery and promotion of nostrums and worthless drugs were among the most prominent abuses that led to formal self-regulation in business and, in turn, to the creation of the Better Business Bureau."

== Contemporary culture ==
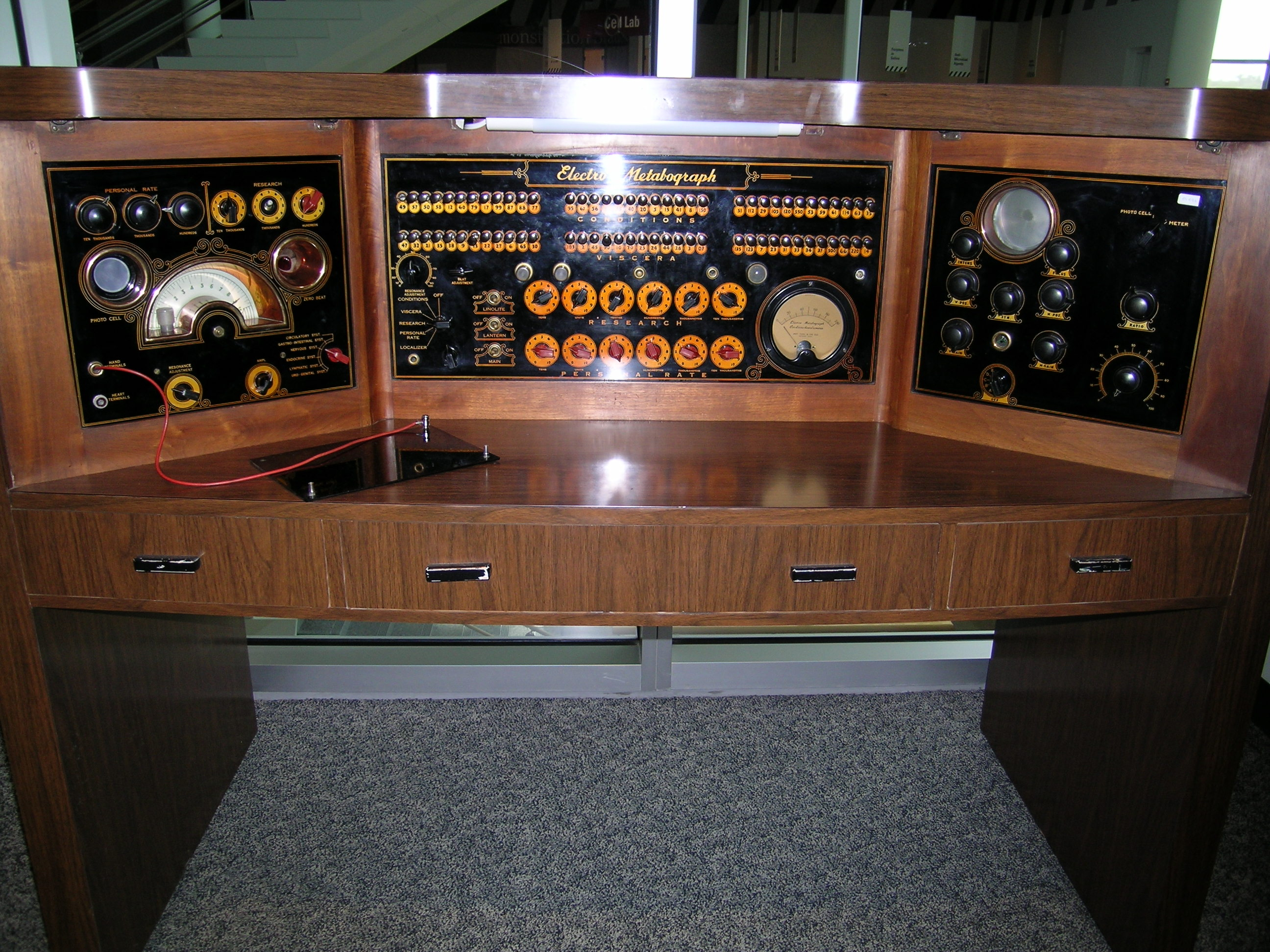
Electro-metabograph machine on display in the "Quackery Hall of Fame" in the Science Museum of Minnesota, St. Paul, Minnesota, US

Quackery is the "promotion of false and unproven health schemes for a profit. It is rooted in the traditions of the marketplace", with "commercialism overwhelming professionalism in the marketing of alternative medicine". Quackery is most often used to denote the peddling of the "cure-alls" described above. Quackery is an ongoing problem that can be found in any culture and in every medical tradition. Unlike other advertising mediums, rapid advancements in communication through the Internet have opened doors for an unregulated market of quack cures and marketing campaigns rivaling the early 20th century. Most people with an e-mail account have experienced the marketing tactics of spamming – in which modern forms of quackery are touted as miraculous remedies for "weight loss" and "sexual enhancement", as well as outlets for medicines of unknown quality.

=== India ===
In 2008, the Hindustan Times reported that some officials and doctors estimated that there were more than 40,000 quacks practicing in Delhi, following outrage over a "multi-state racket where unqualified doctors conducted hundreds of illegal kidney transplants for huge profits." The president of the Indian Medical Association (IMA) in 2008 criticized the central government for failing to address the problem of quackery and for not framing any laws against it.

In 2017, IMA again asked for an antiquackery law with stringent action against those practicing without a license. As of 2024, the government of India is yet to pass an anti-quackery law.

==== Ministry of Ayush ====
In 2014, the Government of India formed a Ministry of AYUSH that includes the seven traditional systems of healthcare. The Ministry of Ayush (expanded from Ayurveda, Yoga, Naturopathy, Unani, Siddha, Sowa-Rigpa and Homoeopathy), is purposed with developing education, research and propagation of indigenous alternative medicine systems in India. The ministry has faced significant criticism for funding systems that lack biological plausibility and are either untested or conclusively proven as ineffective. Quality of research has been poor, and drugs have been launched without any rigorous pharmacological studies and meaningful clinical trials on Ayurveda or other alternative healthcare systems.

There is no credible efficacy or scientific basis of any of these forms of treatment. A strong consensus prevails among the scientific community that homeopathy is a pseudo-scientific, unethical and implausible line of treatment. Ayurveda is deemed to be pseudoscientific. Much of the research on postural yoga has taken the form of preliminary studies or clinical trials of low methodological quality; there is no conclusive therapeutic effect except in back pain. Naturopathy is considered to be a form of pseudo-scientific quackery, ineffective and possibly harmful, with a plethora of ethical concerns about the very practice.

Unani lacks biological plausibility and is considered to be pseudo-scientific quackery, as well.

=== United States ===
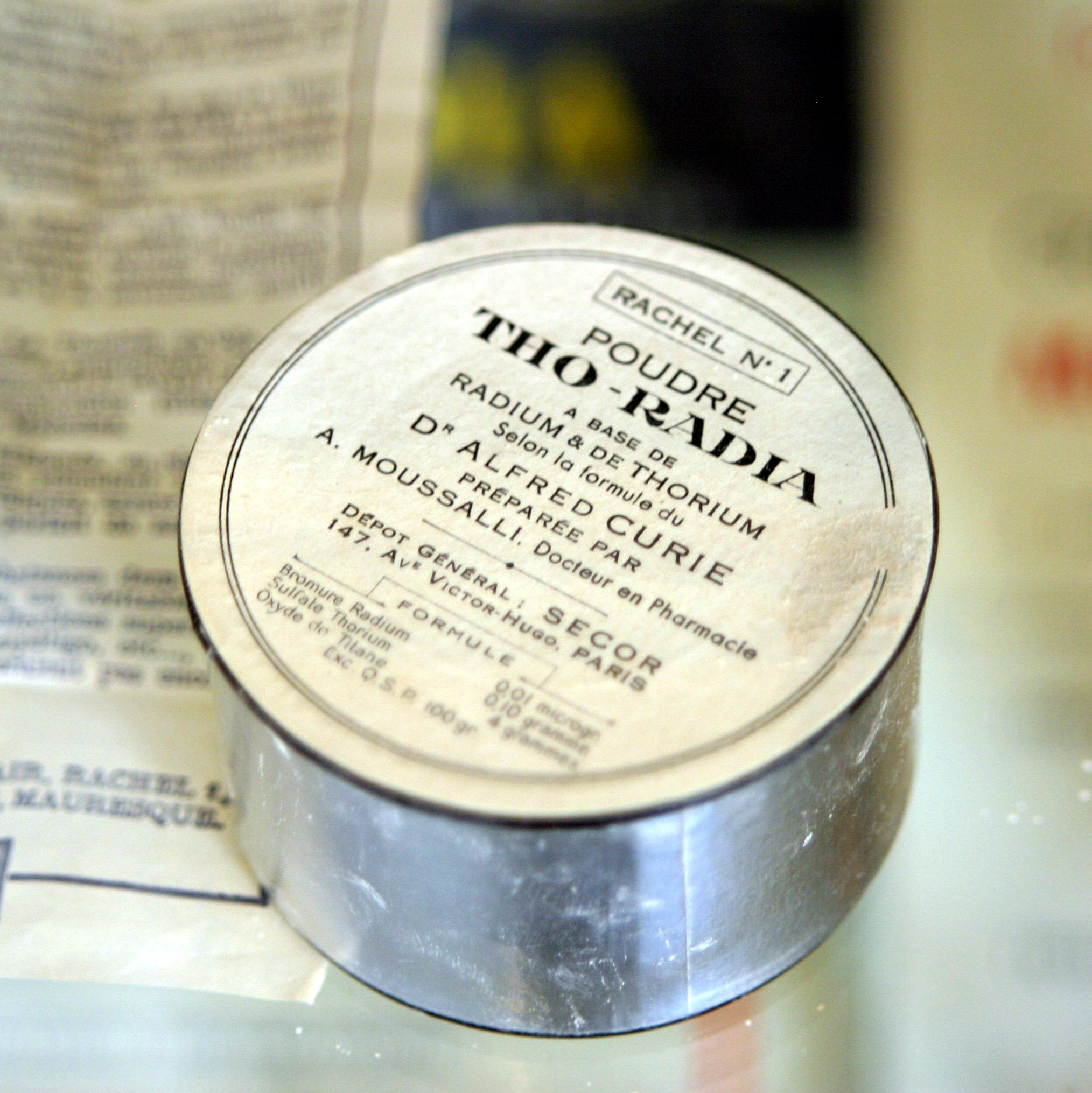
"Tho-radia powder" box, an example of radioactive quackery

While quackery is often aimed at the aged or chronically ill, it can be aimed at all age groups, including teens, and the FDA has mentioned some areas where potential quackery may be a problem: breast developers, weight loss, steroids and growth hormones, tanning and tanning pills, hair removal and growth, and look-alike drugs.

In 1992, the president of The National Council Against Health Fraud, William T. Jarvis, wrote in Clinical Chemistry that:

The U.S. Congress determined quackery to be the most harmful consumer fraud against elderly people. Americans waste $27 billion annually on questionable health care, exceeding the amount spent on biomedical research. Quackery is characterized by the promotion of false and unproven health schemes for profit and does not necessarily involve imposture, fraud, or greed. The real issues in the war against quackery are the principles, including scientific rationale, encoded into consumer protection laws, primarily the U.S. Food, Drug, and Cosmetic Act. More such laws are badly needed. Regulators are failing the public by enforcing laws inadequately, applying double standards, and accrediting pseudomedicine. Non-scientific health care (e.g., acupuncture, ayurvedic medicine, chiropractic, homeopathy, naturopathy) is licensed by individual states. Practitioners use unscientific practices and deception on a public who, lacking complex health-care knowledge, must rely upon the trustworthiness of providers. Quackery not only harms people, it undermines the scientific enterprise and should be actively opposed by every scientist.

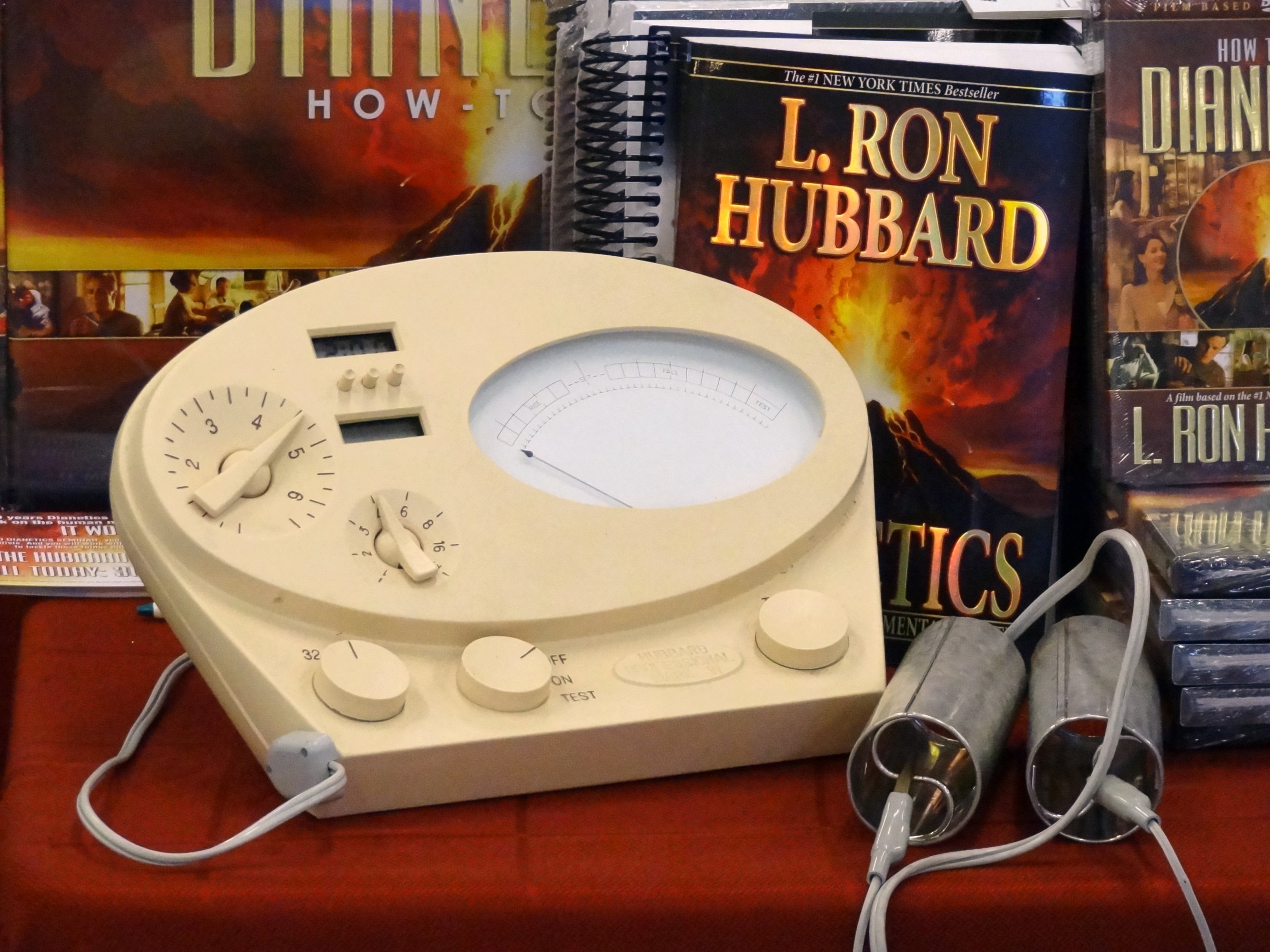
Scientology's E-Meter, a quack device for measuring 'engrams'

For those in the practice of any medicine, to allege quackery is to level a serious objection to a particular form of practice. Most developed countries have a governmental agency, such as the Food and Drug Administration (FDA) in the US, whose purpose is to monitor and regulate the safety of medications as well as the claims made by the manufacturers of new and existing products, including drugs and nutritional supplements or vitamins. The Federal Trade Commission (FTC) participates in some of these efforts. To better address less regulated products, in 2000, US President Clinton signed Executive Order 13147 that created the White House Commission on Complementary and Alternative Medicine. In 2002, the commission's final report made several suggestions regarding education, research, implementation, and reimbursement as ways to evaluate the risks and benefits of each. As a direct result, more public dollars have been allocated for research into some of these methods.

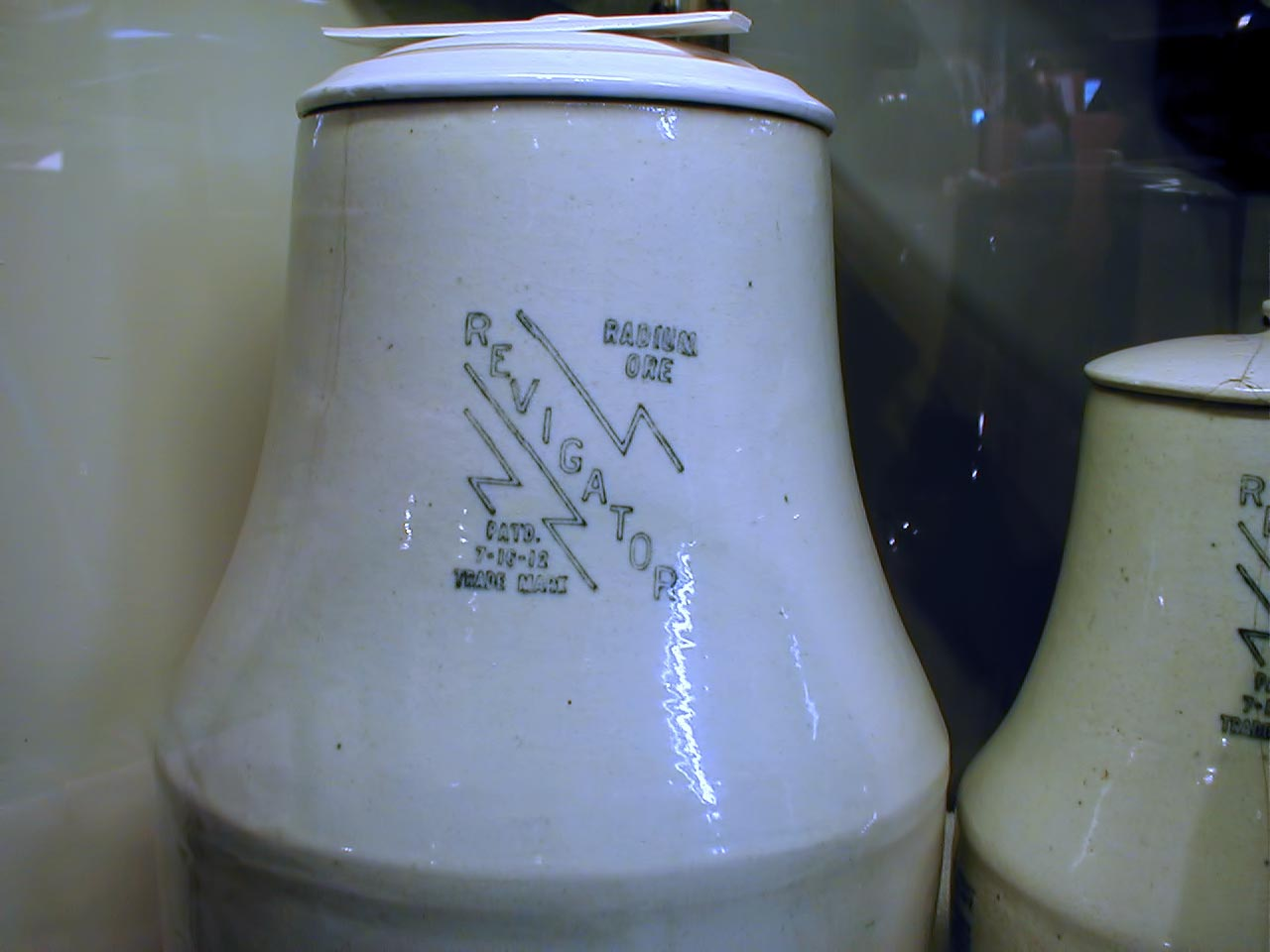
The 1929 Revigator (sometimes misspelled Revigorator) was a pottery crock lined with radioactive ore that emitted radon.

Individuals and non-governmental agencies are active in attempts to expose quackery. According to John C. Norcross et al. less is consensus about ineffective "compared to effective procedures" but identifying both "pseudoscientific, unvalidated, or 'quack' psychotherapies" and "assessment measures of questionable validity on psycho-metric grounds" was pursued by various authors. The evidence-based practice (EBP) movement in mental health emphasizes the consensus in psychology that psychological practice should rely on empirical research. There are also "anti-quackery" websites, such as Quackwatch, that help consumers evaluate claims. Quackwatch's information is relevant to both consumers and medical professionals.

== Presence and acceptance ==
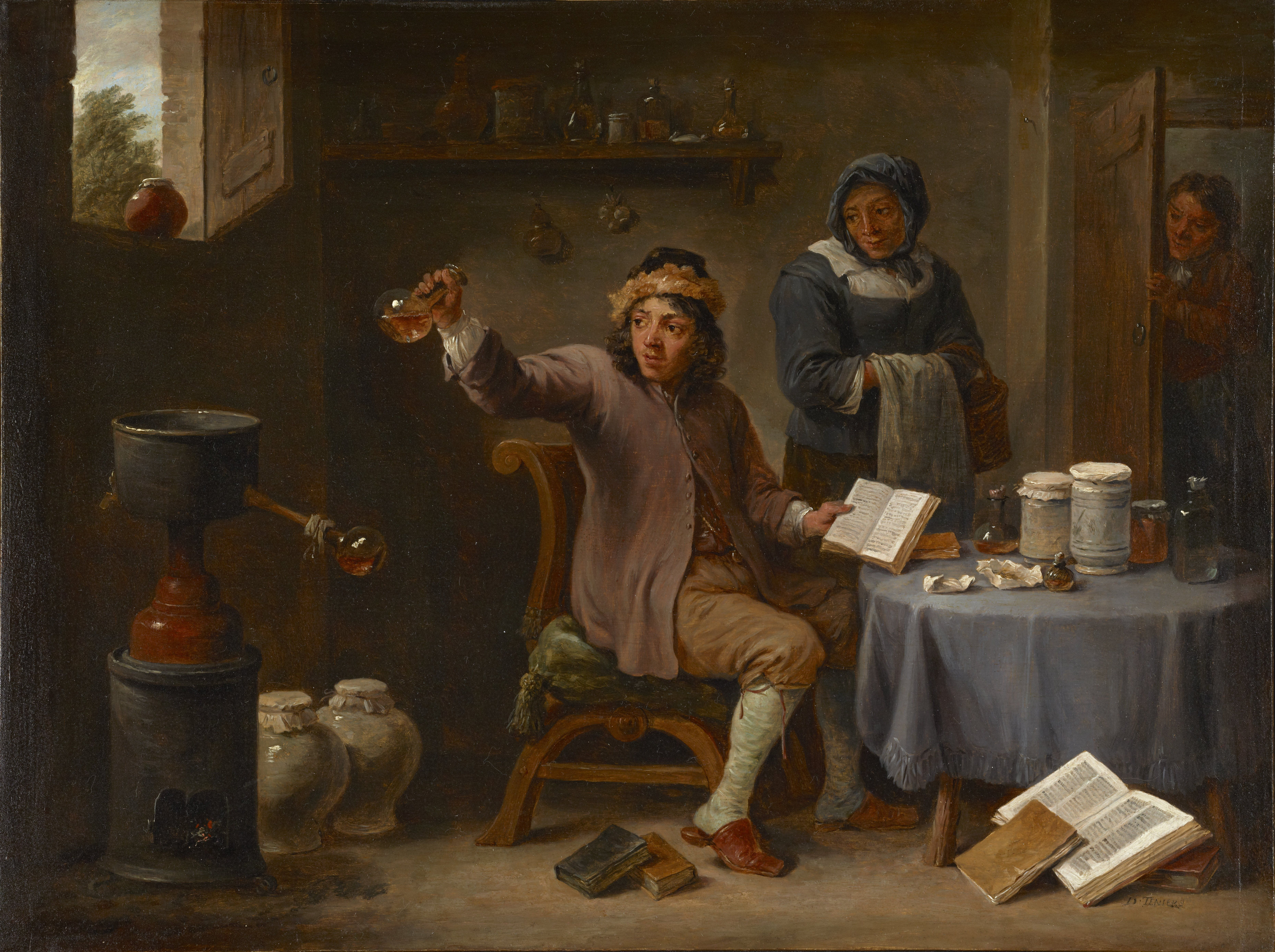
The pee looker (Piskijker), David Teniers the Younger (1660)

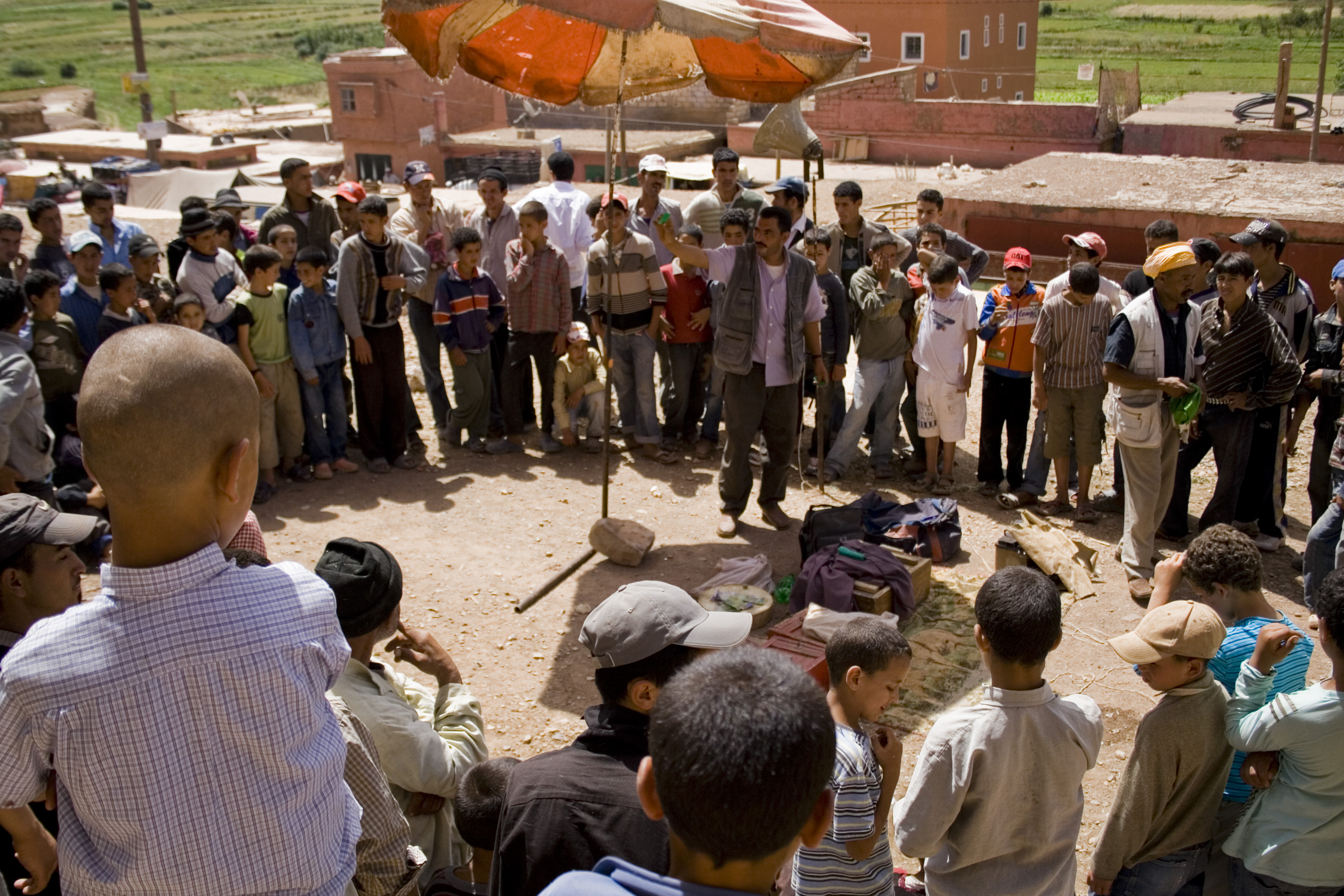
A quack selling cards with a verse from the Quran which is supposed to protect the wearer from snakebites. Tabant, Aït Bouguemez valley, Central Morocco (2009).

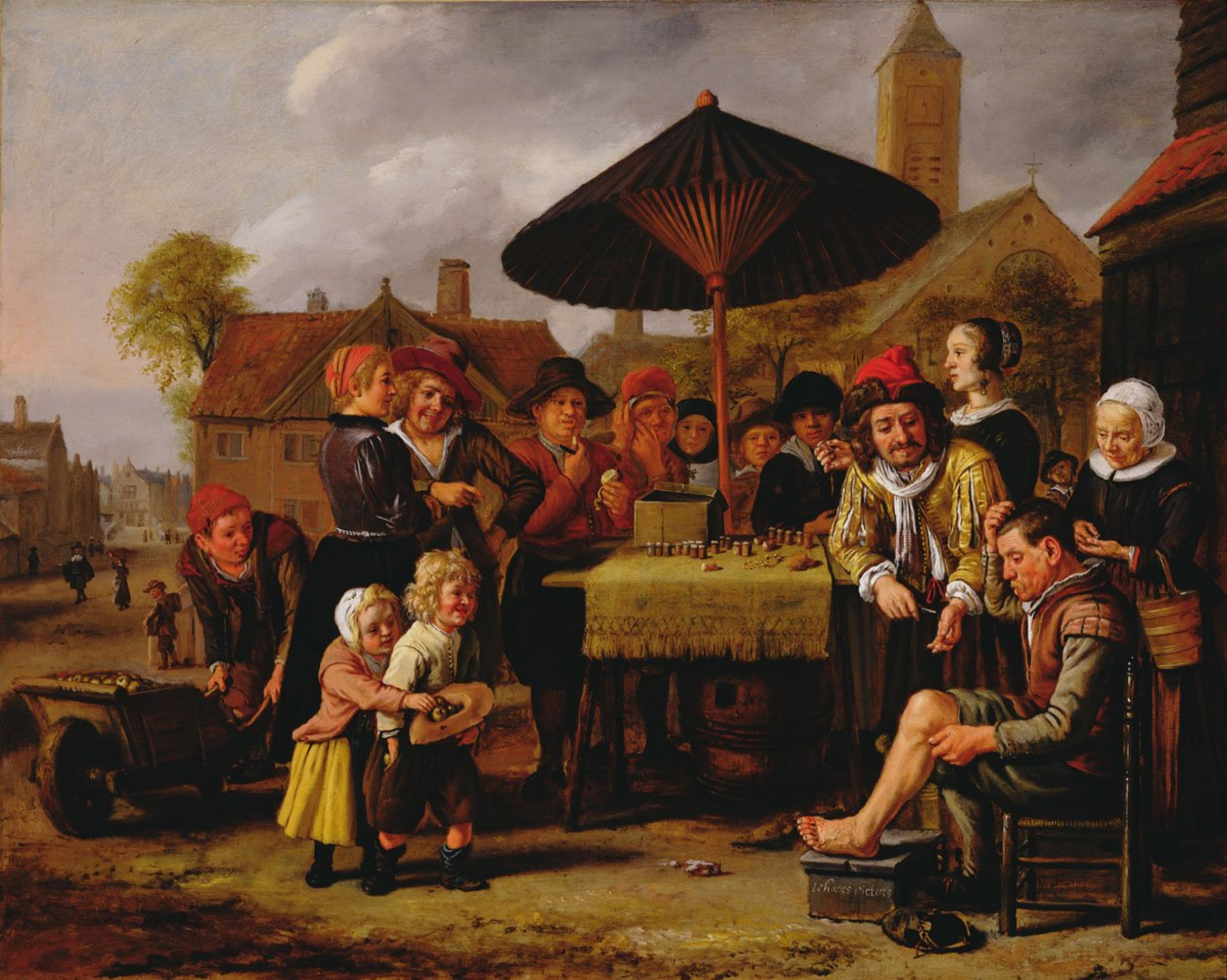
The Quack Doctor, Jan Victors (c. 1635)

There have been several suggested reasons why quackery is accepted by patients in spite of its lack of effectiveness:

Ignorance
Those who perpetuate quackery may do so to take advantage of ignorance about conventional medical treatments versus alternative treatments, or may themselves be ignorant regarding their own claims. Mainstream medicine has produced many remarkable advances, so people may tend to also believe groundless claims.
Placebo effect
Medicines or treatments known to have no pharmacological effect on a disease can still affect a person's perception of their illness, and this belief in its turn does indeed sometimes have a therapeutic effect, causing the patient's condition to improve. This is not to say that no real cure of biological illness is effected – "though we might describe a placebo effect as being 'all in the mind', we now know that there is a genuine neurobiological basis to this phenomenon." People report reduced pain, increased well-being, improvement, or even total alleviation of symptoms. For some, the presence of a caring practitioner and the dispensation of medicine is curative in itself.
Regression fallacy
Lack of understanding that health conditions change with no treatment and attributing changes in ailments to a given therapy.
Confirmation bias
The tendency to search for, interpret, or prioritize information in a way that confirms one's beliefs or hypotheses. It is a type of cognitive bias and a systematic error of inductive reasoning.
Distrust of conventional medicine
Many people, for various reasons, have a distrust of conventional medicine, or of the regulating organizations such as the FDA, or the major drug corporations. For example, "CAM may represent a response to disenfranchisement [discrimination] in conventional medical settings and resulting distrust".
Conspiracy theories
Anti-quackery activists ("quackbusters") are often falsely accused of being part of a huge "conspiracy" to suppress "unconventional" and/or "natural" therapies, as well as those who promote them. It is alleged that this conspiracy is backed and funded by the pharmaceutical industry and the established medical care system – represented by the AMA, FDA, ADA, CDC, WHO, etc. – for the purpose of preserving their power and increasing their profits. This idea is often held by people with antiscience views.
Fear of side effects
A great variety of pharmaceutical medications can have very distressing side effects, and many people fear surgery and its consequences, so they may opt to shy away from these mainstream treatments.
Cost
There are some people who simply cannot afford conventional treatment, and seek out a cheaper alternative. Nonconventional practitioners can often dispense treatment at a much lower cost. This is compounded by reduced access to healthcare.
Desperation
People with a serious or terminal disease, or who have been told by their practitioner that their condition is "untreatable", may react by seeking out treatment, disregarding the lack of scientific proof for its effectiveness, or even the existence of evidence that the method is ineffective or even dangerous. Despair may be exacerbated by the lack of palliative non-curative end-of-life care. Between 2012 and 2018 appeals on UK crowdfunding sites for cancer treatment with an alternative health element have raised £8 million. This is described as "a new and lucrative revenue stream for cranks, charlatans, and conmen who prey on the vulnerable."
Pride
Once people have endorsed or defended a cure, or invested time and money in it, they may be reluctant or embarrassed to admit its ineffectiveness and therefore recommend a treatment that does not work. This is a manifestation of the sunk cost fallacy.
Fraud
Some practitioners, fully aware of the ineffectiveness of their medicine, may intentionally produce fraudulent scientific studies, for example, thereby confusing any potential consumers as to the effectiveness of the medical treatment.

== Deceased persons accused of quackery ==
- Thomas Allinson (1858–1918), founder of naturopathy. His views often brought him into conflict with the Royal College of Physicians of Edinburgh and the General Medical Council, particularly his opposition to doctors' frequent use of drugs, his opposition to vaccination and his self-promotion in the press. His views and publication of them led to him being labeled a quack and being struck off by the General Medical Council for infamous conduct in a professional respect.
- Lovisa Åhrberg (1801–1881), the first Swedish female doctor. Åhrberg was met with strong resistance from male doctors and was accused of quackery. During the formal examination, she was acquitted of all charges and allowed to practice medicine in Stockholm even though it was forbidden for women in the 1820s. She later received a medal for her work.
- Johanna Brandt (1876–1964), a South African naturopath who advocated the "Grape Cure" as a cure for cancer.
- John R. Brinkley (1885–1942), a nonphysician and xenotransplant specialist in Kansas, US, who claimed to have discovered a method of effectively transplanting the testicles of goats into aging men. After state authorities took steps to shut down his practice, he retaliated by entering politics in 1930 and unsuccessfully running for the office of Governor of Kansas.
- Hulda Regehr Clark (1928–2009), was a controversial naturopath, author, and practitioner of alternative medicine who claimed to be able to cure all diseases and advocated methods that have no scientific validity.
- Max Gerson (1881–1959), was a German-born American physician who developed a dietary-based alternative cancer treatment that he claimed could cure cancer and most chronic, degenerative diseases. His treatment was called The Gerson Therapy. Most notably, Gerson Therapy was used, unsuccessfully, to treat Jessica Ainscough and Garry Winogrand. According to Quackwatch, Gerson Institute claims of cure are based not on actual documentation of survival, but on "a combination of the doctor's estimate that the departing patient has a 'reasonable chance of surviving', plus feelings that the Institute staff have about the status of people who call in". The American Cancer Society reports that "[t]here is no reliable scientific evidence that Gerson therapy is effective ..."

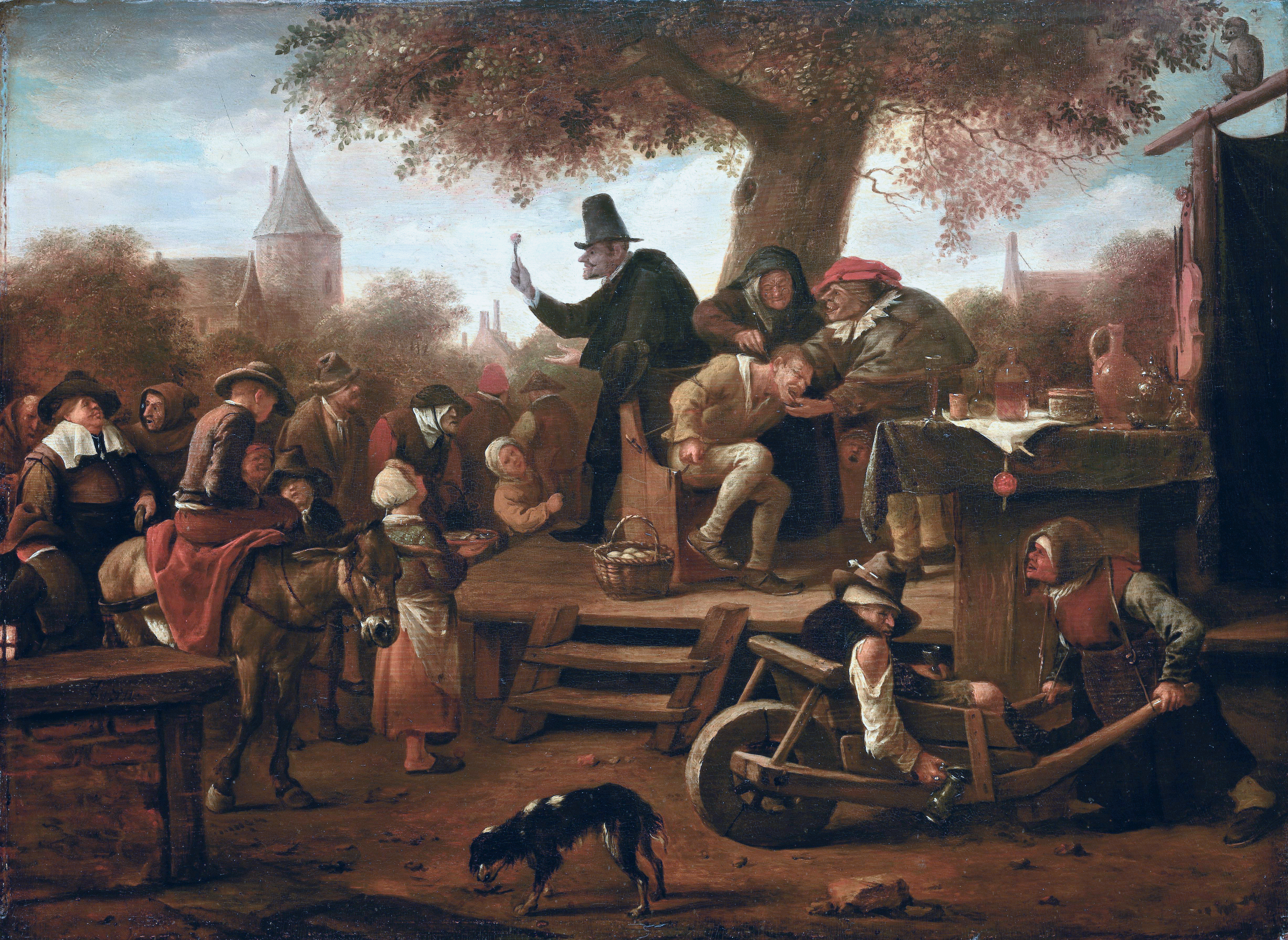
The quack, Jan Steen (c. 1650–60)

- Samuel Hahnemann (1755–1843), founder of homeopathy. Hahnemann believed that all diseases were caused by "miasms", which he defined as irregularities in the patient's vital force. He also said that illnesses could be treated by substances that in a healthy person produced similar symptoms to the illness, in extremely low concentrations, with the therapeutic effect increasing with dilution and repeated shaking.
- Lawrence B. Hamlin (in 1916), was fined under the 1906 US Pure Food and Drug Act for advertising that his Wizard Oil could kill cancer.
- L. Ron Hubbard (1911–1986), creator of Dianetics and Scientology, has been described by government agencies, the media, psychiatric organizations, and critics as a quack, fraud, and promoter of pseudoscience. In the 1960s, the Food and Drug Administration raided Scientology offices and seized E-meters, later barring Hubbard from making medical claims about the device.
- Linda Hazzard (1867–1938), was a self-declared doctor and fasting specialist, which she advertised as a panacea for every medical ailment. Up to 40 patients may have died of starvation in her "sanitarium" in Olalla, Washington, US. Imprisoned for one death in 1912, Hazzard was paroled in 1915 and continued to practice medicine without a license in New Zealand (1915–1920) and Washington, US (1920–1935). Died in 1938 while attempting a fasting to cure herself.
- William Donald Kelley (1925–2005), was an orthodontist and a follower of Max Gerson who developed his own alternative cancer treatment called Nonspecific Metabolic Therapy. This treatment is based on the unsubstantiated belief that "wrong foods [cause] malignancy to grow, while proper foods [allow] natural body defenses to work". It involves, specifically, treatment with pancreatic enzymes, 50 daily vitamins and minerals (including laetrile), frequent body shampoos, coffee enemas, and a specific diet. According to Quackwatch, "not only is his therapy ineffective, but people with cancer who take it die more quickly and have a worse quality of life than those having standard treatment, and can develop serious or fatal side-effects. Kelley's most famous patient was actor Steve McQueen.
- John Harvey Kellogg (1852–1943), was a medical doctor in Battle Creek, Michigan, US, who ran a sanitarium using holistic methods, with a particular focus on nutrition, enemas and exercise. Kellogg was an advocate of vegetarianism and invented the corn flake breakfast cereal with his brother, Will Keith Kellogg.
- John St. John Long (1798–1834) was an Irish artist who claimed to be able to cure tuberculosis by causing a sore or wound on the back of the patient, out of which the disease would exit. He was tried twice for manslaughter of his patients who died under this treatment.
- Franz Anton Mesmer (1734–1815), was a German physician and astrologist, who invented what he called magnétisme animal.
- Theodor Morell (1886–1948), a German physician best known as Adolf Hitler's personal doctor. Morell administered approximately 74 substances, in 28 different mixtures to Hitler, including heroin, cocaine, Doktor Koster's Antigaspills, potassium bromide, papaverine, testosterone, vitamins and animal enzymes. Despite Hitler's dependence on Morell, and his recommendations of him to other Nazi leaders, Hermann Göring, Heinrich Himmler, Albert Speer and others quietly dismissed Morell as a quack.
- Daniel David Palmer (1845–1913), was a grocery store owner that claimed to have healed a janitor of deafness after adjusting the alignment of his back. He founded the field of chiropractic based on the principle that all disease and ailments could be fixed by adjusting the alignment of someone's back. His hypothesis was disregarded by medical professionals at the time and despite a considerable following has yet to be scientifically proven. Palmer established a magnetic healing facility in Davenport, Iowa, styling himself 'doctor'. Not everyone was convinced, as a local paper in 1894 wrote about him: "A crank on magnetism has a crazy notion that he can cure the sick and crippled with his magnetic hands. His victims are the weak-minded, ignorant and superstitious, those foolish people who have been sick for years and have become tired of the regular physician and want health by the short-cut method … he has certainly profited by the ignorance of his victims … His increase in business shows what can be done in Davenport, even by a quack."
- Louis Pasteur (1822–1895), was a French chemist best known for his remarkable breakthroughs in microbiology. His experiments confirmed the germ theory of disease, also reducing mortality from puerperal fever (childbed), and he created the first vaccine for rabies. He is best known to the general public for showing how to stop milk and wine from going sour – this process came to be called pasteurization. His hypotheses initially met with much hostility, and he was accused of quackery on multiple occasions. However, he is now regarded as one of the three main founders of microbiology, together with Ferdinand Cohn and Robert Koch.
- Linus Pauling (1901–1994), a Nobel Prize winner in chemistry, Pauling spent much of his later career arguing for the treatment of somatic and psychological diseases with orthomolecular medicine. Among his claims were that the common cold could be cured with massive doses of vitamin C. Together with Ewan Cameron he wrote the 1979 book Cancer and Vitamin C, which was again more popular with the public than the medical profession, which continued to regard claims about the effectiveness of vitamin C in treating or preventing cancer as quackery. A biographer has discussed how controversial his views on megadoses of Vitamin C have been and that he was "still being called a 'fraud' and a 'quack' by opponents of his 'orthomolecular medicine'".
- Doctor John Henry Pinkard (1866–1934) was a Roanoke, Virginia businessman and "Yarb Doctor" or "Herb Doctor" who concocted quack medicines that he sold and distributed in violation of the Food and Drugs Act and the earlier Pure Food and Drug Act. He was also known as a "clairvoyant, herb doctor and spiritualist." Some of Pinkard's Sanguinaria Compound, made from bloodroot or bloodwort, was seized by federal officials in 1931. "Analysis by this department of a sample of the article showed that it consisted essentially of extracts of plant drugs including sanguinaria, sugar, alcohol, and water. It was alleged in the information that the article was misbranded in that certain statements, designs, and devices regarding the therapeutic and curative effects of the article, appearing on the bottle label, falsely and fraudulently represented that it would be effective as a treatment, remedy, and cure for pneumonia, coughs, weak lungs, asthma, kidney, liver, bladder, or any stomach troubles, and effective as a great blood and nerve tonic." He pleaded guilty and was fined.
- Wilhelm Reich (1897–1957), Austrian-American Psychoanalyst. Claimed that he had discovered a primordial cosmic energy called Orgone. He developed several devices, including the Cloudbuster and the Orgone Accumulator, that he believed could use orgone to manipulate the weather, battle space aliens and cure diseases, including cancer. After an investigation, the US Food and Drug Administration concluded that they were dealing with a "fraud of the first magnitude". On 10 February 1954, the US Attorney for Maine filed a complaint seeking a permanent injunction under Sections 301 and 302 of the Federal Food, Drug, and Cosmetic Act, to prevent interstate shipment of orgone accumulators and to ban some of Reich's writing promoting and advertising the devices. Reich refused to appear in court, arguing that no court was in a position to evaluate his work. Reich was arrested for contempt of court, and convicted to two years in jail, a US$10,000 fine, and his Orgone Accumulators and work on Orgone were ordered to be destroyed. On 23 August 1956, six tons of his books, journals, and papers were burned in the 25th Street public incinerator in New York. On 12 March 1957, he was sent to Danbury Federal Prison, where Richard C. Hubbard, a psychiatrist who admired Reich, examined him, recording paranoia manifested by delusions of grandiosity, persecution, and ideas of reference. Nine months later, on 18 November 1957, Reich died of a heart attack while he was in the federal penitentiary in Lewisburg, Pennsylvania.
- William Herbert Sheldon (1898–1977), who created the theory of somatotypes corresponding to intelligence.

== Quackery on the Internet ==
As technology has evolved, particularly with the advent and wide adoption of the Internet, it has increasingly become a source of quackery. For example, writing in The New York Times Magazine, Virginia Heffernan criticized WebMD for biasing readers toward drugs that are sold by the site's pharmaceutical sponsors, even when they are unnecessary. She wrote that WebMD "has become permeated with pseudomedicine and subtle misinformation."

== See also ==
- Confidence trick
- Crystal healing
- Detoxification foot baths
- Health care fraud
- List of topics characterized as pseudoscience
- Medical error
- Medicines and Healthcare products Regulatory Agency
- Osteopathy
- Psychic
- Quackdown
- Snake oil

== Works cited ==
- Carroll, 2003. "The Skeptics Dictionary". New York: Wiley.
- Della Sala, 1999. Mind Myths: Exploring Popular Assumptions about the Mind and Brain. New York: Wiley.
- Eisner, 2000. The Death of Psychotherapy; From Freud to Alien Abductions. Westport, CT: Praegner.
- Lilienfeld, SO., Lynn, SJ., Lohr, JM. 2003. Science and Pseudoscience in Clinical Psychology. New York: Guildford
- Norcross JC; Garofalo A.; Koocher G. (2006). "Discredited Psychological Treatments and Tests; A Delphi Poll". Professional Psychology: Research and Practice. 37 (5): 515–522. doi:10.1037/0735-7028.37.5.515. S2CID 35414392.
