= International Lyme and Associated Diseases Society =

Alternative medicine society

The International Lyme and Associated Diseases Society (ILADS) is a non-profit advocacy group which advocates for greater acceptance of the controversial and unrecognized diagnosis "chronic Lyme disease". ILADS was formed by advocates for the recognition of "chronic Lyme disease" including physicians, patients and laboratory personnel, and has published alternative treatment guidelines and diagnostic criteria due to the disagreement with mainstream consensus medical views on Lyme disease. The diagnostic and treatment approaches advocated by ILADS are not based on good evidence, and run counter to best practice as exemplified by the recommendations of the Infectious Diseases Society of America.

ILADS sustains misinformation on the fake condition known as "chronic Lyme disease", including advocating for long-term antibiotic treatment. The existence of persistent borrelia infection is not supported by high quality clinical evidence, and the use of long term antibiotics is dangerous and contradicted. Major US medical authorities, including the Infectious Diseases Society of America, the American Academy of Neurology, and the National Institutes of Health, are careful to distinguish the diagnosis and treatment of "patients who have had well-documented Lyme disease and who remain symptomatic for many months to years after completion of appropriate antibiotic therapy" from patients who have not had well-documented Lyme disease; the consensus accepts the existence of post–Lyme disease symptoms in a minority of patients who have had Lyme. The consensus rejects long-term antibiotic treatment even for these patients, as entailing too much risk and lacking sufficient efficacy to subject patients to the risks. The consensus calls for more research into understanding the pathologies that afflict patients with post-Lyme syndrome and into better treatments.

A 2004 article in the Pediatric Infectious Disease Journal on the prevalence of inaccurate online information about Lyme disease cited the ILADS website as a source of such inaccurate material.

False chronic Lyme disease diagnoses are frequently justified due to non-specific symptoms. However, a questionnaire of non-specific symptoms based on an ILADS symptom checklist was found to be not useful for distinguishing patients with post-Lyme symptoms from those with other conditions.

ILADS has also promoted Morgellons, another supposed condition unsupported by medical science. Morgellons—which is generally considered a form of delusional parasitosis by mainstream doctors—involves a belief that fibers are being produced by the skin. Among the top promoters of Morgellons is former ILADS president Raphael Stricker, who claims that chronic Lyme disease is causing the fibers to grow. In 2015, The Atlantic reported that Stricker treats people who believe they have Morgellons with long-term antibiotics.
