= Kenneth Blum =

American scientist

Kenneth Blum (born August 8, 1939) is an American scientist who has studied neuropsychopharmacology and genetics. Until 1995 he was a professor of pharmacology at the University of Texas Health Science Center at San Antonio.

== Career ==
Blum collaborated on a study that found a correlation between an allele in the dopamine D2 receptor and alcoholism in a post-mortem study of brain tissue from 35 alcoholics and 35 non-alcoholics. Blum believed his work to be of broader scope, calling this gene a "reward gene" which covers other addictive behaviors including drug addiction, smoking, overeating, and pathological gambling.

Blum originated the concept of "reward deficiency syndrome" (RDS) in 1996. The term has been applied to a wide variety of addictive, obsessive and compulsive behaviors including substance and process addictions, personality and spectrum disorders. There is no consistent evidence to validate any such syndrome. "Reward deficiency syndrome" is not a medically recognized disorder:

Blum is the editor-in-chief of Journal of Reward Deficiency Syndrome and Addiction Science and founded the company that publishes it, United Scientific Group. Blum was also editor-in-chief of OMICS Publication Group's Journal of Addiction Research & Therapy (JART) from 2013 to 2015. Both United Scientific Group and OMICS Group are featured on Beall's list and are widely regarded as predatory open-access publishers.

Blum has received patents for the use of dietary supplements to treat RDS. Blum licenses these patents through his company Synaptamine, Inc., which is incorporated in Austin, Texas. Supplements marketed in this way include Synaptamine, SyntaptaGenX, and Synaptose. Synaptamine has been licensed to LaVita RDS, a company based in Lehi, Utah, of which Blum was the chief scientific officer. Synaptamine was subsequently marketed by Sanus Biotech, a company based in Austin, Texas. SynaptaGenX is licensed to NuPathways Inc., for whom Blum acts as chief neuroscience advisor.

Blum markets a genetic test, the Genetic Addiction Risk Score (GARS), through his company IGENE LLC in partnership with Dominion Diagnostics, through LifeGen, Inc., where he is chairman of the board and chief scientific officer, and via Geneus Health for whom he also acts chief scientific officer and chairman. It is claimed that GARS assesses the genetic predisposition toward RDS.

Until 2008 he was chief scientific officer of Salugen Inc., another direct-to-consumer genetics testing company. After Blum's departure, Salugen continued under the leadership of Brian Meshkin, latterly CEO of Prove Biosciences, until its demise a year later. Blum is Scientific Director of the PATH foundation.

== Publications ==
- Blum, K., Gaskill, H., DeLallo, L., Briggs, A. H., & Hall, W. (1985). Methionine enkephalin as a possible neuromodulator of regional cerebral blood flow. Experientia, 41(7), 932–933. https://doi.org/10.1007/BF01970019
- Blum, Kenneth; Noble, Ernest; Peter J. Sheridan; Anne Montgomery; Terry Ritchie; Pudur Jagadeeswaran; Harou Nogami; Arthur H. Briggs; Jay B. Cohn (April 18, 1990). "Allelic Association of Human Dopamine D2 Receptor Gene in Alcoholism". Journal of the American Medical Association. 263 (15): 2055–60. doi:10.1001/jama.1990.03440150063027. ISSN 1538-3598. PMID 1969501.
- Blum, Kenneth; Payne, James E (1991). Alcohol and the Addictive Brain. New York: The Free Press. ISBN 0-02-903701-8.
- Blum, K.; Sheridan, P. J.; Wood, R. C.; Braverman, E. R.; Chen, T J H.; Phd, J G Cull; Comings, D. E. (1996). "The D2 Dopamine Receptor Gene as a Determinant of Reward Deficiency Syndrome". Journal of the Royal Society of Medicine. 89 (7): 396–400. doi:10.1177/014107689608900711. PMC 1295855. PMID 8774539.
- Blum, Kenneth G.; Cull, John R.; Braverman, Eric E.; Comings, David (1996). "Reward Deficiency Syndrome". American Scientist. 84 (2): 132. Bibcode:1996AmSci..84..132B.
- Blum, Kenneth; Braverman, Eric R; Holder, Jay M; Lubar, Joel F; Monastra, Vincent J; Miller, David; Comings, David E (November 2000). "Reward Deficiency Syndrome: A Biogenetic Model for the Diagnosis and Treatment of impulsive, Addictive, and Compulsive Behaviors". Journal of Psychoactive Drugs. 32 (Supplement): i–iv, 1–112. doi:10.1080/02791072.2000.10736099. ISSN 0279-1072. PMID 11280926. S2CID 22497665.
- Blum, K., Febo, M., Fried, L., Li, M., Dushaj, K., Braverman, E. R., McLaughlin, T., Steinberg, B., & Badgaiyan, R. D. (2017). Hypothesizing that neuropharmacological and neuroimaging studies of glutaminergic-dopaminergic optimization complex (KB220Z) are associated with “Dopamine Homeostasis” in Reward Deficiency Syndrome (RDS). Substance Use & Misuse, 52(4), 535–547. doi: 10.1080/10826084.2016.1244551
- Blum, K., Gondré-Lewis, M. C., Baron, D., Thanos, P. K., Braverman, E. R., Neary, J., Elman, I., & Badgaiyan, R. D. (2018). Introducing precision addiction management of reward deficiency syndrome, the construct that underpins all addictive behaviors. Frontiers in Psychiatry, 9. https://doi.org/10.3389/fpsyt.2018.00548
- Blum, K., Febo, M., Mclaughlin, T., Cronjé, F. J., Han, D., & Gold, M. S. (2014). Hatching the behavioral addiction egg: Reward Deficiency Solution System (RDSS)™ as a function of dopaminergic neurogenetics and brain functional connectivity linking all addictions under a common rubric. Journal of Behavioral Addictions, 3(3), 149–156. https://doi.org/10.1556/jba.3.2014.019
- Blum, K., Febo, M., Thanos, P. K., Baron, D., Fratantonio, J., & Gold, M. (2015). Clinically combating reward deficiency syndrome (RDS) with dopamine agonist therapy as a paradigm shift: Dopamine for dinner? Molecular Neurobiology, 52(3), 1862–1869.
- Blum, K., Chen, A. L. C., Giordano, J., Borsten, J., Chen, T. J. H., Hauser, M., Simpatico, T., Femino, J., Braverman, E. R., & Barh, D. (2012). The addictive brain: All roads lead to dopamine. Journal of Psychoactive Drugs, 44(2), 134–143. https://doi.org/10.1080/02791072.2012.685407
