= Broda Otto Barnes =

American physician (1906–1988)

- Born: April 14, 1906; Missouri
- Died: November 1, 1988 (aged 82); Bend, Oregon
- Education: University of Denver BS; Western Reserve University MS; University of Chicago PhD (1931); Rush Medical College MD (1937)
- Occupation: Physician
- Employer: University of Illinois Research Hospital
- Known for: Hypothyroidism
- Spouse: Charlotte Edna Webster (1904-1980) (m. 1932–1980) 1st wife Helen Tucker Morgan (1905-2002) (m. 1981–1988) 2nd wife

Broda Otto Barnes (14 April 1906 – 1 November 1988) was an American physician and professor of medicine who studied endocrine dysfunction, particularly hypothyroidism. In the 1970s, Barnes published several books arguing that hypothyroidism was underdiagnosed in the U.S. and was responsible for a wide range of health problems. Barnes' views on the prevalence of hypothyroidism were never widely accepted by the medical community and run counter to its current understanding of thyroid function, but they have been embraced by some elements of the alternative medicine community.

== Biography ==
Barnes was born on April 14, 1906, in a log cabin in Missouri, the son of Addie and Robert B. Barnes. Barnes studied chemistry at the University of Denver, and became an instructor of physiological chemistry at Western Reserve University for two years, receiving his M.S. in 1930. Barnes received his Ph.D. from the University of Chicago in 1931 and taught physiology there from 1931 to 1936. He completed his M.D. in 1937 at Rush Medical College, and for two years he was an assistant professor of medicine at the University of Illinois. He was named chairman of the Health Education Department at the University of Denver. He became professor affiliate in the department of physiology at Colorado State University from 1963 to 1968. On 13 September 1981 he married Helen Tucker Morgan (1905–2002) in California. She was his second wife.

In 1984, Barnes established a not-for-profit foundation, the Broda O. Barnes Research Foundation, to continue to advocate his arguments about hypothyroidism. Barnes and his wife also established a program of interest-free student loans to aid "worthy and needy chemistry students" at the University of Denver. The University of Chicago library retains a collection of memorabilia, consisting largely of photographs related to Barnes' time there.

He died on 1 November 1988 in Bend, Oregon.

== Hypothyroidism perspective ==
Barnes developed and promoted a diagnostic test for thyroid function that became known as the "Barnes Basal Temperature Test". This test is performed by placing a thermometer in the armpit for 10 minutes immediately upon waking (for premenopausal women, the test is performed on the 2nd and 3rd day of menstruation). Barnes considered a measurement of 97.8 °F (36.6 °C) or below to be highly indicative of hypothyroidism, especially when hypothyroid symptoms are present. Barnes believed that a reading over 98.2 °F (36.8 °C) was indicative of hyperthyroidism, unless a patient had advanced arthritis, which he claimed would falsely elevate the temperature due to muscle contractions.

The details of the test were published in the Journal of the American Medical Association (JAMA) in August 1942. The test has never been adopted by the medical profession; however, it was subsequently promoted by Barnes in a series of books, and is currently advocated by some alternative medicine practitioners. In modern medical practice, the most accurate means of assessing thyroid function is through specific biochemical tests which measure blood levels of thyroid gland hormones and regulators. In his books, Barnes argued that hypothyroidism affected more than 40% of the American population, significantly higher than the prevalence of approximately 5% reported in the peer-reviewed medical literature. Barnes believed that many common diseases, including heart disease, cancer, depression, arthritis, diabetes, the common cold, tonsillitis, ear infections, apparent laziness in children, various menstrual disorders, and skin disorders, were all caused or exacerbated by hypothyroidism.

=== Treatment ===
Barnes treated hypothyroidism by prescribing patients a daily dose of thyroid hormone. He recommended starting with a small dose, and then slowly increasing the dosage in monthly intervals until symptoms resolved and waking body temperature was between 97.8F and 98.2F. He also recommended never surpassing 3 grains of desiccated thyroid. For most patients, he recommended continuing thyroid medication for life at that optimal dose, though some could be slowly weaned off. Barnes used a desiccated thyroid extract, Armour Thyroid, almost exclusively, based on his anecdotal observation that it was superior to synthetic hormones.

During his years of practice, Barnes also began to believe that virtually all his hypothyroid patients had concomitant undiagnosed adrenal insufficiency. Based on this speculation, he routinely prescribed an accompanying dose of the synthetic corticosteroid prednisone. Barnes argued that it was mandatory to give prednisone to patients with a systolic blood pressure below 100.

== Pregnancy test research ==
In 1932, W. Fleischmann and S. Kann reported in a German gestational physiology journal that female bitterings, small carp-like fish, "show an enlargement of the ovipositor following injection of an estrogenic preparation".

Since human pregnancy urine contains estrogen, Drs. Aaron E. Kanter, Carl P. Bauer and Arthur H. Klawans of the University of Chicago added a teaspoon of urine from a pregnant woman to a bowl in which a bitterling was swimming. This experiment produced ovipositor lengthening, as expected by reasoning from the earlier results of Fleischmann. In 1935, Time magazine nationally reported their announcement of this potentially useful new test for human pregnancy, which was then currently determined by rabbit and mouse tests. But subsequent to the announcement, Kanter et al., found that urine from non-pregnant women or men had the same effect.

Barnes was the principal investigator, with obstetricians Kanter and Klawans, in an experiment reported in 1936. They sought to determine the source organ of whatever non-pregnant urine substance was causing the same bitterling ovipositor response as Fleischmann's estrogenic preparation. Barnes, et al., extracted juice from 14 different organs of seven species (including both genders of humans) and exposed bitterlings to them. The organ they found responsible was the adrenal cortex. The Barnes, et al., 1936, publication in Science was also reported in Time.

In 1938, Fleischmann and Kann determined that in addition to estrogen, a specific adrenal hormone, corticosterone, could cause the observed bitterling ovipositor reaction. This additional non-pregnant hormone reaction made the bitterling test not useful for its originally announced purpose, though it did open the door to an investigation of why corticosterone is significant in urine.

== Books ==
- Barnes, Broda Otto (1976). Hypothyroidism: The Unsuspected Illness. HarperCollins. ISBN 978-0-690-01029-9.
- Barnes, Broda Otto (1989). Hope for Hypoglycemia: It's Not Your Mind, It's Your Liver. Fries Communications. ISBN 978-0-913730-26-3.
- Barnes, Broda Otto; Charlotte W. Barnes (1976). Solved: The Riddle of Heart Attacks. Robinson Press. ISBN 978-0-913730-27-0.
- Barnes, Broda Otto; Charlotte W. Barnes (1972). Heart Attack Rareness in Thyroid-treated Patients. Springfield, Ill.: Thomas. ISBN 978-0-398-02519-9.

== See also ==
- Wilson's temperature syndrome, similar claims about hypothyroidism
