= Chronic Lyme disease =

Belief that symptoms are caused by an unproven infection

Pseudomedical diagnosis
- Risks: Nocebo
- Treatment risks: Dangers of long-term antibiotic therapy, delaying appropriate care
- Legality: Some jurisdictions have legislated to protect doctors offering worthless and potentially dangerous treatments

Chronic Lyme disease (CLD) is the name used by some people with non-specific symptoms, such as fatigue, muscle pain, and cognitive dysfunction to refer to their condition, even if there is no evidence that they had Lyme disease. Both the label and the belief that these people's symptoms are caused by this particular infection are generally rejected by medical professionals. Chronic Lyme disease is distinct from post-treatment Lyme disease syndrome, a set of lingering symptoms which may persist after successful antibiotic treatment of infection with Lyme-causing Borrelia bacteria, and which may have similar symptoms to those associated with CLD.

Despite numerous studies, there is no evidence that symptoms associated with CLD are caused by any persistent infection. The symptoms attributed to chronic Lyme are in many cases likely due to fibromyalgia or myalgic encephalomyelitis. Fibromyalgia can be triggered by an infection, and antibiotics are not a safe or effective treatment for post-infectious fibromyalgia. Fatigue, joint and muscle pain are also experienced by a minority of people following antibiotic treatment for Lyme disease.

A number of alternative health products are promoted for chronic Lyme disease, of which possibly the most controversial and harmful is long-term antibiotic therapy, particularly intravenous antibiotics. Recognised authorities advise against long-term antibiotic treatment for Lyme disease, even where some symptoms persist post-treatment.

In the United States, after disciplinary proceedings by state medical licensing boards, a subculture of "Lyme literate" physicians has successfully lobbied for specific legal protections, exempting them from the standard of care and science-based treatment guidelines. Such legislation has been criticised as an example of "legislative alchemy", the process whereby pseudomedicine is legislated into practice. Some doctors view the promotion of chronic Lyme disease as an example of health fraud.

== Description and background ==
Chronic Lyme disease is distinct from untreated late-stage Lyme disease, which can cause arthritis, peripheral neuropathy and/or encephalomyelitis. Chronic Lyme disease is also distinct from post-treatment Lyme disease syndrome (PTLDS) when symptoms linger after standard antibiotic treatments. PTLDS is estimated to occur in less than 5% of people who had Lyme disease and were treated. In contrast to these recognized medical conditions, the promotion of chronic Lyme disease has been accused of being health fraud. In many cases there is no objective evidence that people who believe they have chronic Lyme have ever been infected with Lyme disease: standard diagnostic tests for infection are often negative.

While it is undisputed that people can have severe symptoms of an illness, the cause and appropriate treatment promoted by "chronic Lyme" advocates are controversial. The symptoms are similar to those of fibromyalgia or chronic fatigue syndrome. Fibromyalgia can be triggered by an infection, and then persist when the infection is completely removed from the body. A few doctors attribute these symptoms to persistent infection with Borrelia, or co-infections with other tick-borne pathogens, such as Ehrlichia and Babesia. Some conclude that the initial infection may cause an autoimmune reaction that continues to cause serious symptoms even after the bacteria have been eliminated by antibiotics.

A review looked at several animal studies that found the persistence of live but disabled spirochetes following treatment of B. burgdorferi infection with antibiotics. The authors noted that none of the lingering spirochetes were associated with inflamed tissues and criticized the studies for not having adequately considered the different pharmacodynamics and pharmacokinetics of the antibiotics used to treat the animals in the trials versus what would be expected to be used to treat humans. The authors concluded, "There is no scientific evidence to support the hypothesis that such spirochetes, should they exist in humans, are the cause of post-Lyme disease syndrome."

Major U.S. medical authorities, including the Infectious Diseases Society of America, the American Academy of Neurology, and the National Institutes of Health, have stated there is no convincing evidence that Borrelia is involved in the various symptoms classed as CLD, and particularly advise against long-term antibiotic treatment as it is ineffective and potentially harmful. Prolonged antibiotic therapy presents significant risks and can have dangerous, even deadly, side effects. Randomized placebo-controlled studies have shown that antibiotics offer no sustained benefit in people with chronic Lyme, with evidence of both placebo effects and significant adverse effects from such treatment. Many people who believe that they have chronic Lyme have fibromyalgia. Fibromyalgia can be difficult to treat, and antibiotics do not work at all for fibromyalgia. A pressure group called the International Lyme and Associated Diseases Society (ILADS) says that the persistence of B. burgdorferi may be responsible for manifestations of chronic Lyme disease symptoms.

Chronic Lyme disease diagnoses are frequently justified due to non-specific symptoms that are common in the population. Consistent with this observation, a study found that a questionnaire of non-specific symptoms based on an ILADS symptom checklist could not distinguish between patients with possible post-Lyme symptoms and those with other conditions.

While many people who receive CLD diagnoses have unexplained symptoms (including chronic fatigue and fibromyalgia), others have well-defined diagnoses. Cases of cancer, a brain tumor, ALS, lupus, multiple sclerosis, a thyroid disorder, and mental disorders have each been misdiagnosed as CLD. Scientists from the Centers for Disease Control and Prevention (CDC) also documented life-threatening infections caused by unnecessary treatment with intravenous antibiotics and immunoglobulins. An adolescent girl and a woman were hospitalized for septic shock, with the woman eventually dying. Other patients developed Staphylococcus aureus and intractable C. difficile.

== Identity ==
Among people who self-identify as having chronic Lyme, the idea of chronic Lyme can function as a type of social identity. In this sense, the goal of the label is not to identify particular objective facts that differentiate one medical condition from another; instead, the main goal is to validate the real suffering experienced by people living with an invisible illness and to provide social support for them as they cope with it. To some patients, receiving a CLD diagnosis can provide a sense of relief and optimism for the future. They may also become dedicated to fighting for recognition of CLD.

== Discredited beliefs ==
Patients who receive a false chronic Lyme diagnosis are frequently told that they have other diagnoses that are not scientifically recognized. Infections may be diagnosed even without compatible symptom history, exposure in an endemic area, or credible positive test results. Some inappropriately diagnosed "co-infections" may be based on known tick-borne infections, such as Babesiosis or anaplasmosis. Others, like bartonellosis or mycoplasmosis, have not been shown to be tick-borne or commonly comorbid with chronic Lyme disease. Some may be told that they are being poisoned by mold. NIH physician Adriana Marques has noted that patients may also be told that they have "metabolic and hormonal imbalances, immune dysfunction, heavy metal toxicity, allergies, damage by toxins, mitochondrial dysfunction and enzyme deficiencies".

CLD advocates have also attempted to link Lyme disease to so-called Morgellons disease, another condition unrecognized by medical science. Morgellons—which is generally considered a form of delusional parasitosis—involves a persistent and pathologic belief that the skin is producing fibers. Among the top promoters of Morgellons is former ILADS president Raphael Stricker, who claims that CLD is causing the fibers to grow. In 2015, The Atlantic reported that Stricker treats people who believe they have Morgellons with long-term antibiotics.

A belief in one’s chronic Lyme disease is often reinforced by fallacious reasoning. For example, if a patient either feels better or feels worse after a treatment, it may be wrongly interpreted as evidence both that the diagnosis is appropriate and that the treatment is working. In the chronic Lyme world, a patient with worsening symptoms may be told that they are "herxing". The "herxing" claims are based on a real phenomenon called the Jarisch–Herxheimer reaction but often do not resemble it. True Jarisch–Herxheimer reactions are generally transient, mild, and found only within the first 24 hours of beginning antibiotics. In online Lyme groups, patients have claimed to "herx" long after initial antibiotic treatment for durations that can last weeks. A mistaken belief that a treatment is working can cause patients to ignore serious drug side effects of antibiotics or prevent diagnosis and treatment of other true causes of worsening symptoms.

If a patient improves while on treatment, experts warn that this also should not be interpreted as evidence of Lyme infection and that the treatment is working. Randomized controlled trials found that close to 40% of people with post-Lyme symptoms felt better while on placebo. An assumption that a treatment works can be reinforced because antibiotics can have anti-inflammatory effects, and many conditions naturally improve over time.

== Political actions ==
While there is general agreement on the optimal treatment for Lyme disease, the existence of chronic Lyme is generally rejected because there is no evidence of its existence. Even among those who believe in it, there is no consensus over its prevalence, symptoms, diagnostic criteria, or treatment. The evidence-based perspective is exemplified by a 2007 review in The New England Journal of Medicine, which noted the diagnosis of chronic Lyme disease is used by a few physicians despite a lack of "reproducible or convincing scientific evidence", leading the authors to describe this diagnosis as "the latest in a series of syndromes that have been postulated in an attempt to attribute medically unexplained symptoms to particular infections." Medical authorities agree with this viewpoint: the Infectious Diseases Society of America (IDSA), the American Academy of Neurology, CDC, and the National Institutes of Health (NIH), advise against long-term antibiotic treatment for people who identify as having chronic Lyme disease, given the lack of supporting evidence and the potential for harmful side-effects including toxicities.

A minority, primarily not medical practitioners, holds that chronic Lyme disease is responsible for a range of unexplained symptoms, sometimes in people without any evidence of past infection. This viewpoint is promoted by many who have been told they have the condition by people who lack experience in science or medicine. Groups, advocates, and the small number of physicians who support the concept of chronic Lyme disease have organized to lobby for recognition of this diagnosis, as well as to argue for insurance coverage of long-term antibiotic therapy, which most insurers deny, as it is at odds with the guidelines of major medical organizations.

Paul G. Auwaerter, director of infectious disease at Johns Hopkins School of Medicine, cited the political controversy and high emotions as contributing to a "poisonous atmosphere" around Lyme disease, which he believes has led to doctors trying to avoid having Lyme patients in their practices.

=== IDSA lawsuit ===
In 2006, Richard Blumenthal, the Connecticut Attorney General, opened an antitrust investigation against the IDSA, accusing the IDSA Lyme disease panel of undisclosed conflicts of interest and of unduly dismissing alternative therapies and chronic Lyme disease. The investigation was closed on May 1, 2008, without charges when the IDSA agreed to submit to a review of its guidelines by a panel of independent scientists and physicians which would occur on July 30, 2009, citing mounting legal costs and the difficulty of presenting scientific arguments in a legal setting.

According to the agreement with Blumenthal, the IDSA Lyme disease guidelines remained in place and unchallenged. A Forbes piece described Blumenthal's investigation as "intimidation" of scientists by an elected official with close ties to Lyme advocacy groups. The Journal of the American Medical Association described the decision as an example of the "politicization of health policy" that went against the weight of scientific evidence and may have a chilling effect on future decisions by medical associations.

The expert panel's review was published in 2010, with the independent doctors and scientists in the panel unanimously endorsing the guidelines, stating "No changes or revisions to the 2006 Lyme guidelines are necessary at this time", and concluding long-term antibiotic treatments are unproven and potentially dangerous. The IDSA welcomed the final report, stating that "Our number one concern is the patients we treat, and we're glad patients and their physicians now have additional reassurance that the guidelines are medically sound."

=== Legal mandates to cover unproven treatments ===
The state of Connecticut, meanwhile, enacted a law on June 18, 2009, "to allow a licensed physician to prescribe, administer or dispense long-term antibiotics for a therapeutic purpose to a patient clinically diagnosed with Lyme disease." The states of Rhode Island, California, Massachusetts, New Hampshire, Vermont, New York, Maine, and Iowa have similar laws.

Massachusetts (2016) and Rhode Island (2003) have laws mandating insurance coverage for long-term antibiotic therapy for Lyme disease when deemed medically necessary by a physician. In 1999 Connecticut had passed a similar, though somewhat more restrictive law.

== Harassment of researchers ==
Some promoters of belief in CLD have harassed mainstream scientists and made false accusations. In 2001, The New York Times Magazine reported that Allen Steere, chief of immunology and rheumatology at Tufts Medical Center and a co-discoverer and leading expert on Lyme disease, had been harassed, stalked, and threatened by patients and patient advocacy groups angry at his refusal to substantiate their diagnoses of "chronic" Lyme disease and endorse long-term antibiotic therapy. Because this intimidation included death threats, Steere was assigned security guards.

== Media ==
A 2004 study in The Pediatric Infectious Disease Journal stated nine of nineteen Internet websites surveyed contained what were described as major inaccuracies. Websites described as providing inaccurate information included several with the word "lyme" in their domain name (e.g., lymenet.org), as well as the website of the International Lyme and Associated Diseases Society. A 2007 article in The New England Journal of Medicine argued media coverage of chronic Lyme disease ignored scientific evidence in favor of anecdotes and testimonials:

The media frequently disregard complex scientific data in favor of testimonials about patients suffering from purported chronic Lyme disease and may even question the competence of clinicians who are reluctant to diagnose chronic Lyme disease ... [contributing] to a great deal of public confusion with little appreciation of the serious harm caused to many patients who have received a misdiagnosis and have been inappropriately treated.

The 2008 documentary film Under Our Skin: The Untold Story of Lyme Disease is by a director whose sister self-identified with the condition. A columnist for Entertainment Weekly wrote of the film:

[Under Our Skin] embraces, with bits and pieces of skimpy evidence and a whole lot more paranoid leftist fervor, the notion that "chronic Lyme disease" is a condition that the medical establishment is locked in a conspiracy to deny the existence of. The filmmakers actually bungle what should have been their real subject (that the belief in chronic Lyme disease has become something of a cult, one that can ruin the lives of the people who think they have it).

== See also ==
- List of diagnoses characterized as pseudoscience
