= Adrenal fatigue =

Alternative diagnosis of adrenal gland exhaustion

Adrenal fatigue is a pseudoscientific term used by alternative medicine providers to suggest that the adrenal glands are exhausted and unable to produce adequate quantities of hormones, primarily cortisol, due to chronic stress or infections. There is no scientific basis for the existence of adrenal fatigue, and the term should not be confused with a number of actual forms of adrenal dysfunction such as adrenal insufficiency or Addison's disease.

== Definition ==
Neither the condition nor the symptoms have any stable or recognized definition.

== History ==
The term "adrenal fatigue" was invented in 1998 by chiropractor James Wilson and applied to a collection of mostly non-specific symptoms.

== Lack of evidence ==
A systematic review found no evidence for the condition, supporting the consensus among mainstream endocrinologists that it is a myth. There is no evidence supporting the concept of adrenal fatigue, and it is not a valid diagnosis recognized by the scientific or medical communities.

== Tests ==
Blood or salivary testing is sometimes offered, but there is no evidence that adrenal fatigue exists, or that it can be tested for.

== Diagnosis ==
Adrenal fatigue is not an accepted medical diagnosis.

== Dietary supplements ==
The concept of adrenal fatigue has given rise to an industry of dietary supplements marketed to treat the supposed condition. These supplements are largely unregulated in the U.S.; they are ineffective and costly; and they in some cases may be dangerous. The cortisol cocktail, a drink containing fruit juice, coconut water and salt, was popularised on social media in 2023 as a treatment for adrenal fatigue.

== See also ==
- Adrenal insufficiency
- Hypocortisolism
- List of topics characterized as pseudoscience
