= DNA teleportation =

Fringe hypothesis

DNA teleportation is a pseudoscientific claim which suggests that DNA can produce electromagnetic signals (EMS) that are measurable when highly diluted in water. The claim suggests these signals can allegedly be recorded, transmitted electronically and re-emitted on another distant pure water sample, where the DNA can replicate through polymerase chain reaction, despite the absence of the original DNA in the new water sample. The idea was introduced by the Nobel laureate Luc Montagnier in 2009. It is similar in principle to water memory, a similar pseudoscientific claim popularised by Jacques Benveniste in 1988.

No independent research has been conducted to support the claim and to this day, there is no known or plausible scientific mechanism by which it might work.

== Electromagnetic signals from DNA ==
=== Bacterial DNA ===
In 2009, Montagnier and his collaborators published a paper titled "Electromagnetic signals are produced by aqueous nanostructures derived from bacterial DNA sequences" in which they reported that bacterial DNA can produce an electromagnetic signal (EMS) that is transferred through the cell culture medium. In a medium of T lymphocytes (a type of white blood cell), they cultured bacterial DNA from Mycoplasma pirum and Escherichia coli. After filtering to remove all the bacteria, polymerase chain reaction was performed, which demonstrated the absence of remaining DNA. The solution was then incubated for two or three weeks, after which the presence of bacterial DNA was again detected. After serial dilution, they tested for electromagnetic radiation using a Fourier analysis technique developed by Jacques Benveniste and his team in 1996. They detected electromagnetic frequencies only at high dilutions, ranging from 10^{−5} to 10^{−12}.

=== Viral DNA ===
In the same year, the team reported similar EMS from the DNA of HIV under high dilution of the culture medium. They used the HIV1 strain as their prototype – it was the discovery of this virus that led to Montagnier sharing the 2008 Nobel Prize in Physiology or Medicine. CEM cells (leukemia T-cells) were used to culture the HIV but no EMS was detected at any level of dilution. However, testing blood samples from HIV-infected patients (including those with symptoms of AIDS, those who have undergone antiretroviral therapy (ART), and untreated individuals) showed detectable EMS from ART-treated patients with undetectable viral loads at plasma dilution levels between 10^{−4} and 10^{−8}.

In 2015, Montagnier's team published another finding similar to the original one, but using bacterial and viral DNA. Here they claim that the electromagnetic waves could be explained in terms of an unspecified quantum effect.

== The DNA transduction experiment ==
The experiment was first made in July 2005, and was repeated and filmed for a TV documentary in 2013, released on the French channel France 5 on 5 July 2014. The online journal Ouvertures detailed the test protocol through interviews with Montagnier.

Montagnier's experiment can be summarised as follows:

1. A known water sample with 2 ng/ml of 104 bases DNA from an HIV infected patient is diluted by 10 into water and agitated for 15 seconds. After filtration to remove the DNA, the dilution and agitation steps are repeated 10 times, reaching high dilution levels of 10^{−10}.
2. The highly diluted sample emits electromagnetic signals (EMS) of low frequencies.
3. This EMS is recorded by a microphone coil and saved as a 6-second WAV file at the lab in Paris.
4. The WAV file is emailed to a partner team at the university of Benevento in Italy.
5. The Italian team emits with a coil for 1 hour the EMS of the WAV file on a sample of distilled water in a sealed metal tube.
6. The water sample is then placed in a polymerase chain reaction (PCR) machine.
7. The PCR machine in Italy produces DNA, 98% identical to the initial DNA in Paris.

== Interpretation ==
It is proposed by Montagnier that some molecules interact through electromagnetic waves instead of direct contact. These waves could be trapped into coherence domains formed by water molecules vacuum spheres at quantum scales. These structures would keep the signal in the absence of the original molecule. During the PCR step of the experiment, this remaining signal could have contained the necessary information for the initial DNA to be reconstructed.

The principle is similar to Benveniste's experiment from 1997 where EMS was recorded from ovalbumine at the Northwestern University Medical School of Chicago, and transmitted through email to Benveniste's Digital Biology Laboratory in Clamart, France. After emitting the signal on pure water for 20 minutes, the water could cause an allergic shock on an isolated Guinea-pig heart allergic to ovalbumine. In both experiments the EMS reproduces the properties of the original molecules in their absence.

== Responses and criticisms ==
The 2009 publications were immediately followed by scientific comments and criticisms of the credibility of the purported phenomenon, as well as the authenticity of the research. According to chemist Jeff Reimers of the University of Sydney, Australia, "If the results are correct, these would be the most significant experiments performed in the past 90 years, demanding re-evaluation of the whole conceptual framework of modern chemistry."

The credibility of the peer-review system of the journal Interdisciplinary Sciences: Computational Life Sciences, in which the 2009 papers were published, was questioned. It was a new journal of which Montagnier is chairman of the editorial board. Gary Schuster, at Georgia Institute of Technology in Atlanta, compared it to pathological science. Paul Myers at the University of Minnesota Morris also described it as "pathological science." He described the paper as "one of the more unprofessional write-ups I've ever run across" and criticized the publication process as having an "unbelievable" turnaround time: "another suspicious sign are the dates. This paper was submitted on 03 January 2009, revised on 05 January 2009, and accepted on 06 January 2009", leading him to ask: "Who reviewed this, the author's mother? Maybe someone even closer. Guess who the chairman of the editorial board is: Luc Montagnier... This is the same nonsense and the same apparatus that Benveniste was peddling." The influence of Benveniste can also be inferred from one of the co-authors, Jamal Aïssa, who was Benveniste's collaborator in the research in which they claim that water memory can be transported through the internet. (It was for this research that Benveniste received his second Ig Nobel Prize in 1998.)

Philip Ball wrote an analysis about Montagnier's work in Chemistry World, stating "It looks like one of the most astonishing discoveries in a century, yet it was almost entirely ignored." He claims this experiment was never replicated and that the work was "ignored for good reason, namely that it's utterly implausible".

On 28 June 2010, Montagnier spoke at the Lindau Nobel Laureate Meeting in Germany, "where 60 Nobel prize winners had gathered, along with 700 other scientists, to discuss the latest breakthroughs in medicine, chemistry and physics." He "presented a new method for detecting viral infections that bore close parallels to the basic tenets of homeopathy. Although fellow Nobel prize winners – who view homeopathy as quackery – were left openly shaking their heads, Montagnier's comments were rapidly embraced by homeopaths eager for greater credibility. Cristal Sumner, of the British Homeopathic Association, said Montagnier's work gave homeopathy 'a true scientific ethos'."

Montagnier was also questioned about his beliefs on homeopathy, to which he replied: "I can't say that homeopathy is right in everything. What I can say now is that the high dilutions are right. High dilutions of something are not nothing. They are water structures which mimic the original molecules. We find that with DNA, we cannot work at the extremely high dilutions used in homeopathy; we cannot go further than a 10^{−18} dilution, or we lose the signal. But even at 10^{−18}, you can calculate that there is not a single molecule of DNA left. And yet we detect a signal."

== See also ==
- Homeopathy
- Pseudoscience
- Junk science
- Masaru Emoto
- Water Memory
