= Benveniste affair =

1988 scientific controversy involving homeopathy

The Benveniste affair (French: [bɛ̃venist]) was a major international controversy in 1988, when Jacques Benveniste published a paper in the prestigious scientific journal Nature describing the action of very high dilutions of anti-IgE antibody on the degranulation of human basophils, findings that seemed to support the concept of homeopathy. As a condition for publication, Nature asked for the results to be replicated by independent laboratories. The controversial paper published in Nature was eventually co-authored by four laboratories worldwide, in Canada, Italy, Israel, and France.

After the article was published, a follow-up investigation was set up by a team including physicist and Nature editor John Maddox, illusionist and well-known skeptic James Randi, as well as fraud expert Walter W. Stewart, who had recently raised suspicion of the work of Nobel laureate David Baltimore. With the cooperation of Benveniste's own team, the group failed to replicate the original results, and subsequent investigations did not support Benveniste's findings. Benveniste refused to retract his controversial article, and he explained (notably in letters to Nature) that the protocol used in these investigations was not identical to his own. However, his reputation was damaged, so he began to fund his research himself, as his external sources of funding were withdrawn.

== Nature publication and investigation ==
Jacques Benveniste, a French immunologist, published a paper in the prestigious scientific journal Nature describing the action of very high dilutions of anti-IgE antibody on the degranulation of human basophils. Biologists were puzzled by Benveniste's results, as only molecules of water, and no molecules of the original antibody remained in these high dilutions. Benveniste concluded that the configuration of molecules in water was biologically active; a journalist coined the term water memory for this hypothesis. Much later, in the 1990s, Benveniste also asserted that this "memory" could be digitized, transmitted, and reinserted into another sample of water, which would then contain the same active qualities as the first sample.

=== Unusual disclaimer ===
Following replication, the article was then published in Nature, which printed an editorial titled "When to believe the unbelievable" in the same issue of the journal and attached the following disclaimer to the article: "Editorial reservation: Readers of this article may share the incredulity of the many referees. ... There is no physical basis for such an activity. ... Nature has therefore arranged for independent investigators to observe repetitions of the experiments." The last time such a disclaimer had been added was in 1974 to an article on Uri Geller.

=== Critical investigation ===
A week after publication of the article, Nature sent a team of three investigators to Benveniste's lab to attempt to replicate his results under controlled conditions. The team consisted of Nature editor and physicist Sir John Maddox, American scientific fraud investigator and chemist Walter W. Stewart, and skeptic and former magician James Randi.

The team pored over the laboratory's records and oversaw seven attempts to replicate Benveniste's study. Three of the first four attempts turned out somewhat favorable to Benveniste; however, the Nature team was not satisfied with the rigor of the methodology. Benveniste invited them to design a double blind procedure, which they did, and conducted three more attempts. The samples were randomized, and Randi wrapped the codes which identified the samples in tinfoil before fixing it on to the ceiling with adhesive tape. Before fully revealing the results, the team asked if there were any complaints about the procedure, but none were brought up. These stricter attempts turned out negative for Benveniste. In response to Benveniste's refusal to withdraw his claims, the team published in the July 1988 edition of Nature. Since multiple readings of the samples were closer than statistically expected for the non-double blind tests, the team argued that unintentional bias was the culprit.

In the same issue of the journal Nature, and in subsequent commentary, Benveniste denied all the claims and stated that such "Salem witchhunts or McCarthy-like prosecutions will kill science."

=== After Dark ===
On 3 September 1988 Channel 4 broadcast an After Dark television discussion featuring Benveniste, James Randi and Walter W. Stewart among others (including Jonathan Miller), reviewed the following week by Sean French in the New Statesman.

== Attempts to replicate Benveniste's results ==
=== Academy of Sciences ===
In 1991, Benveniste found the French Academy of Sciences willing to publish his latest results, obtained under the supervision of Alfred Spira, a statistician, in its weekly Proceedings. Eric Fottorino writing in Le Monde relates how the remorseful Academy of Science noticed that an earlier edition contained a study critical of the memory of water. Seizing on this opportunity, the Academy ordered the printing to stop and the already printed copies destroyed, so that it could print a revised edition, in which Benveniste's article was labeled a mere "right of reply"—downgraded from the status of an article. The study is a replication of early high dilution experiments, in collaboration with Inserm U292.

Although the new findings fell substantially short of confirming the patterns previously claimed by Benveniste, writer Yves Lignon quotes study co-author and statistician Alfred Spira, who said that "the transmission of information persisted at high dilution", and acknowledged that a "weakness in the experimental procedure was possible".

=== Ovelgonne et al. ===
A group of Dutch researchers reported their failure to duplicate the results in Experientia in 1992:

In fact, in our hands no effect of extreme dilutions was shown at all. We conclude that the effect of extreme dilutions of anti-IgE, reported by Davenas et al., needs further clarification and that in this process the reproducibility of results between experimenters should be carefully determined.

=== Hirst et al. ===
A group of English researchers reported another failure to duplicate the results in Nature in 1993:

Following as closely as possible the methods of the original study, we can find no evidence for any periodic or polynomial change of degranulation as a function of anti-IgE dilution.

However, Benveniste in a 1994 letter to Nature argued that the study neglected to faithfully follow his methods. The study has also been criticized on the grounds that its results were more favourable to Benveniste's claims than the study authors acknowledged in their conclusion.

=== Josephson and the APS ===
After the Nature controversy, Benveniste gained the public support of Brian Josephson, a Nobel laureate physicist with a reputation for openness to paranormal claims. Experiments continued along the same basic lines, culminating with a 1997 paper claiming the effect could be transmitted over phone lines. This was followed by two additional papers in 1999 and another, in the controversial non-peer reviewed Medical Hypotheses, on remote-transmission in 2000 by which time it was claimed that it could also be sent over the Internet.

Time magazine reported in 1999 that, in response to skepticism from physicist Robert Park, Josephson had challenged the American Physical Society (APS) to oversee a replication by Benveniste. This challenge was to be "a randomized double-blind test", of his claimed ability to transfer the characteristics of homeopathically altered solutions over the Internet:

[Benveniste's] latest theory, and the cause of the current flap, is that the "memory" of water in a homeopathic solution has an electromagnetic "signature." This signature, he says, can be captured by a copper coil, digitized and transmitted by wire--or, for extra flourish, over the Internet--to a container of ordinary water, converting it to a homeopathic solution.

The APS accepted the challenge and offered to cover the costs of the test. When he heard of this, Randi offered to throw in the long-standing $1 million prize for any positive demonstration of the paranormal, to which Benveniste replied: "Fine to us". Randi later noted that Benveniste and Josephson did not follow up on their challenge, mocking their silence on the topic as if they were missing persons.

=== Ennis et al. ===
An article published in Inflammation Research in 2004 brought new media attention to the issue with this claim:

In 3 different types of experiment, it has been shown that high dilutions of histamine may indeed exert an effect on basophil activity. This activity observed by staining basophils with alcian blue was confirmed by flow cytometry. Inhibition by histamine was reversed by anti-H2 and was not observed with histidine these results being in favour of the specificity of this effect. We are however unable to explain our findings and are reporting them to encourage others to investigate this phenomenon.

Following up on a study they had published in 1999 in the same journal, the researchers concluded that an effect did exist. Some of the researchers had not been involved in homeopathic research before, while others had, such as former Benveniste collaborator Philippe Belon, research director at the homeopathic company Boiron. It was Madeleine Ennis who received the most attention in the media. Ennis led the activities at the British lab, with other labs in Europe, running a variation of Benveniste's water memory experiments. Ennis states that she began the research as a skeptic, but concluded that the "results compel me to suspend my disbelief and start searching for rational explanations for our findings."

=== BBC Horizon ===
In 2002 BBC Horizon broadcast its failed attempt to win James Randi's $1 million prize to prove that a highly diluted substance could still have an effect. Prominent spokespersons on both sides of the debate were interviewed, including Benveniste.

A report was published in 2005 in the statistics magazine Significance by the statistician Martin Bland, professor at the University of York.

=== Further study ===
With the support of Brian Josephson, the experiments continued, culminating in a 1997 paper claiming a water memory effect could be transmitted over phone lines. This culminated in two additional papers in 1999 and another on remote-transmission in 2000.

Intrigued by Benveniste's claims that biological interactions could be digitized, the US Defense Advanced Research Projects Agency (DARPA) asked Wayne Jonas, homeopath and then director of the US National Center for Complementary and Alternative Medicine, to organize an attempt at independently replicating the claimed results. An independent test of the 2000 remote-transmission experiment was carried out in the US by a team funded by the US Department of Defense. Using the same experimental devices and setup as the Benveniste team, they failed to find any effect when running the experiment. Several positive results were noted, but only when a particular one of Benveniste's researchers was running the equipment. Benveniste admitted to having noticed this himself, and offered a variety of reasons to explain what appeared to be another example of experimenter effect. The experiment is also notable for the way it attempted to avoid the confrontational nature of the earlier Maddox test. The study implemented "A social and communication management process that was capable of dealing with conflicting interpersonal dynamics among vested parties in the research effort." One of Benveniste's machines was used, and, in the design and pilot project phase in 2001, Benveniste and other members of his DigiBio lab participated as consultants. Interviews at the time indicated study participants were satisfied with the way the study was being conducted. In the end, the authors reported in The FASEB Journal in 2006 that "Our team found no replicable effects from digital signals".

== INSERM ==
The July 1989 edition of Nature reported that INSERM placed Benveniste on probation following a routine evaluation of his lab. Although INSERM found that his laboratory activities overall were exemplary, it expressed severe discomfort with his high dilution studies, and criticized him for "an insufficiently critical analysis of the results he reported, the cavalier character of the interpretations he made of them, and the abusive use of his scientific authority vis-à-vis his informing of the public".

== See also ==
- Experimental errors and frauds in physics
- Junk science
- Pathological science
- Protoscience
- Topics characterized as pseudoscience
- Scientific misconduct

== Bibliography ==
- Benveniste, Jacques (2005) Ma vérité sur la 'mémoire de l'eau, Albin Michel. ISBN 2-226-15877-4
- Benveniste, Jacques, and Peter Jurgens. On the Role of Stage Magicians in Biological Research The Anomalist 1998
- Benveniste, Jacques. Electromagnetically Activated Water and the Puzzle of the Biological Signal INSERM Digital Biology Laboratory (10 March 1999)
- Benveniste, Jacques. "Put a match to pyre review". Nature. 396. 10 December 1998.
- Benveniste, Jacques. "Further Biological Effects Induced by Ultra High Dilutions: Inhibition by a Magnetic Field", In P.C. Endler, ed.,Ultra High Dilution: Physiology and Physics. Dordrecht: Kluwe academic, 1994
- Benveniste, Jacques, "Transfer of Biological Activity by Electromagnetic Fields". Frontier Perspectives 3(2) 1993:113-15.
- Benveniste, Jacques (1993). "Molecular signaling at high dilution or by means of electronic circuitry". Journal of Immunology. 150: 146A.
- Benveniste, Jacques (1994). "Transfer of the molecular signal by electronic amplification". FASEB Journal. 8: A398.
- Benveniste, Jacques (1995). "Electronic transmission of the cholinergic signal". FASEB Journal. 9: A683.
- Benveniste, Jacques (1995). "Direct transmission to cells of a molecular signal via an electronic device". FASEB Journal. 9: A227.
- Benveniste, J.; Ducot, B.; Spira, A. (1994). "Memory of water revisited". Nature. 370 (6488): 322. Bibcode:1994Natur.370..322B. doi:10.1038/370322a0. PMID 8047128.
- Benveniste, J., Davenas, E. & A. Spira (1991) Comptes Rendus de l'Académie des Sciences, January.
