= Mirza Saqib Baig =

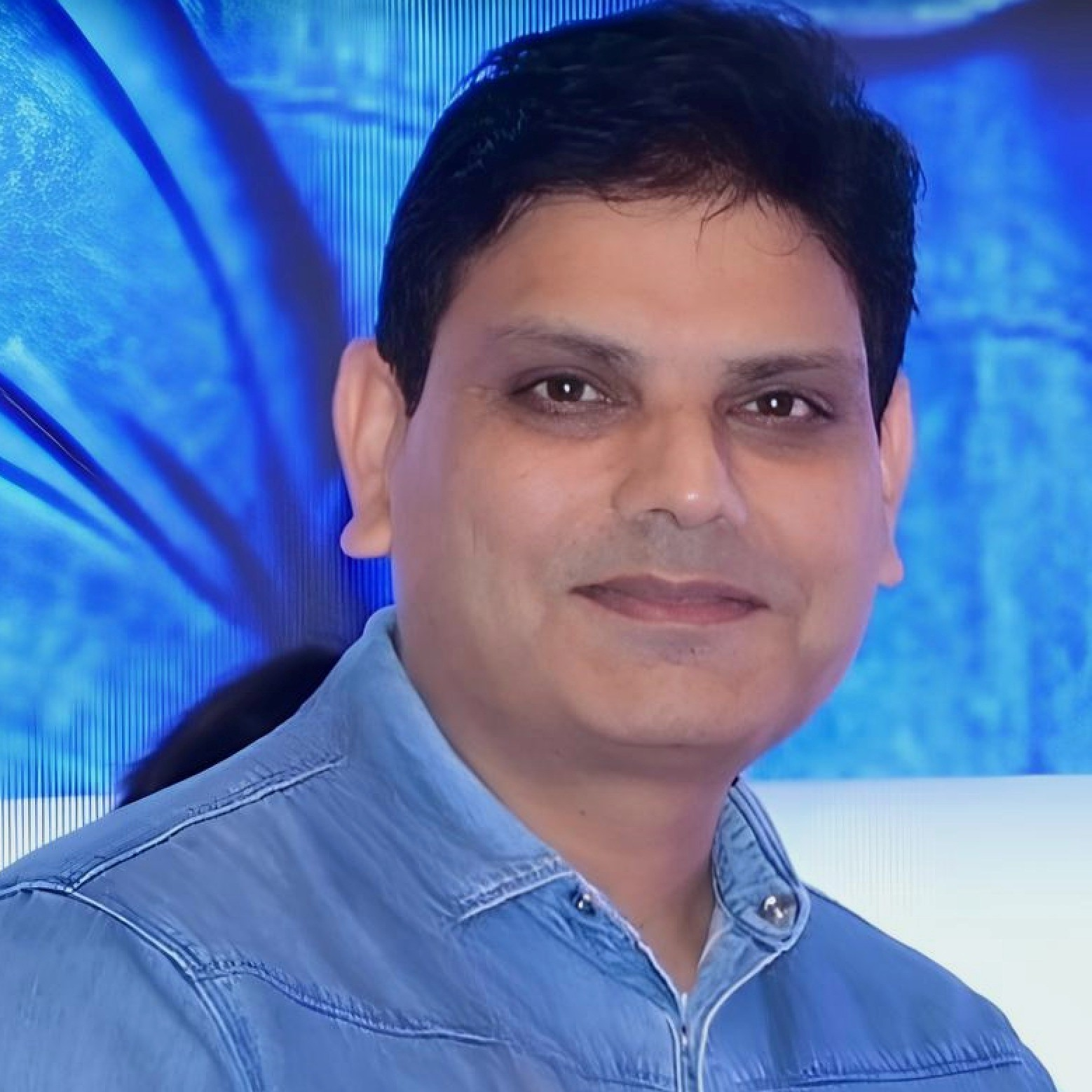
- Baig in 2026
- Education: University of Rajasthan (B.Sc.) Aligarh Muslim University (M.Sc.) Central Drug Research Institute (Ph.D.)
- Known for: Innate immunity and inflammatory pathways; TIRAP signaling in cancer and immunity; Onco-immunology; Macrophage biology; Stem cell–immune system interactions; Infectious disease immunology; Therapeutic development
- Scientific career
- Fields: Inflammation, Cancer research, Macrophage, Stem cell, Immunology, Drug development
- Workplaces: CSIR - Indian Institute of Toxicology Research (2009-2010) University of Illinois at Chicago (2010-2014) Mayo Clinic (2014-2015) IIT Indore - Indian Institute of Technology Indore (2015-present)
- Website: https://msblab.in/

Mirza Saqib Baig is an Indian researcher, who specializes in Chronic Inflammation and Cancer Biology. Since 2006, he has published numerous research articles, with the most notable contributions appearing in academic journals such as The Journal of Experimental Biology, Frontiers in Immunology, European Journal of Pharmacology, Scientific Reports, Inflammation Research and Inflammopharmacology. Baig's research trajectory began with a focus on infectious diseases and immune responses, particularly the molecular pathways underlying chronic inflammatory conditions. He later expanded into oncology, elucidating how immune mechanisms influence cancer initiation, progression, and the tumour microenvironment. His current work integrates stem cell biology with immunological principles to unravel the interactions between stem cells, immune signalling networks, and tissue regeneration, with the overarching goal of developing innovative therapeutic strategies for both cancer and infectious diseases.

== Education ==
Baig obtained his Bachelor of Science (B.Sc.) degree in 1999 from the University of Rajasthan (Jaipur, India), followed by a Master of Science (M.Sc.) in Biotechnology in 2001 from Aligarh Muslim University (Aligarh, India). He then pursued doctoral studies in Biochemistry at the Central Drug Research Institute (Lucknow, India), earning his Ph.D. in 2008. Subsequently, Baig undertook fellowships in inflammation and cancer research at the Indian Institute of Toxicology Research (Lucknow, India), the University of Illinois at Chicago (Chicago, USA), and the Mayo Clinic (Rochester, USA).

== Career ==
Baig began his research career in 2002 at the Central Drug Research Institute (Lucknow, India), where he pursued his doctoral studies on the infectious disease and anti-leishmanial drug discovery. He earned his Ph.D. in 2008 and subsequently worked at the Indian Institute of Toxicology Research (Lucknow, India) on Molecular Toxicology.

In January 2010, he joined the University of Illinois at Chicago (Chicago, United States) as a postdoctoral researcher, studying hematopoietic stem cells, macrophages, and endothelial cells with a focus on chronic inflammation and cancer where he worked with Dr. Nadim Mahmud and Dr. Marcelo Bonini on projects in cancer biology and chronic inflammatory diseases. In 2014, Baig joined the Mayo Clinic (Rochester, United States) on a research fellowship, where he worked with Dr. Vijay Shah on project related to inflammation and liver fibrosis.

In 2015, he returned to India on a fellowship award from the Government of India (Ramalingaswami and Ramanujan Fellowship) and joined the Indian Institute of Technology Indore. He was appointed Assistant Professor in 2016, promoted to Associate Professor in 2018, and became Professor in 2023. His laboratory at IIT Indore focuses on understanding the role of macrophages in chronic inflammatory disease and cancer, aiming to identify key therapeutic targets for innovative treatment strategies.

In 2025, Baig received the AHA–International Professorship Award from the American Heart Association, United States. He was elected a Fellow of the Royal Society of Biology (RSB) in 2024 and, in the same year, was awarded the Dr. G. P. Talwar Mid-Career Scientist Award by the Indian Immunology Society–Indian Institute of Science (IISc). His international research appointments include the IUBMB Mid-Career Research Fellowship (2021) from the International Union of Biochemistry and Molecular Biology, the ASM–IUSSTF Indo-US Professorship (2021) from the American Society for Microbiology, and the International Collaborative Research Award (2021) from the Japan Agency for Medical Research and Development (AMED) and the New York Academy of Sciences (NYAS). He has also been profiled by the New York Academy of Sciences and featured on other scientific and media platforms. Baig has been invited to deliver lectures and collaborate with leading institutions worldwide. His engagements include visits to Harvard University, Tufts University, Rutgers University, and Indiana University School of Medicine in the United States; University of Cambridge, University of Oxford, and King's College London in the United Kingdom; the University of California San Francisco and the University of Illinois at Chicago in the United States; Technical University of Munich in Germany; Tohoku University and Osaka University in Japan; Koc University and Middle East Technical University in Turkey; and Sapienza University of Rome in Italy.

== Academic Visits ==
=== Academic Visit to the University of Queensland, Australia (2025) ===
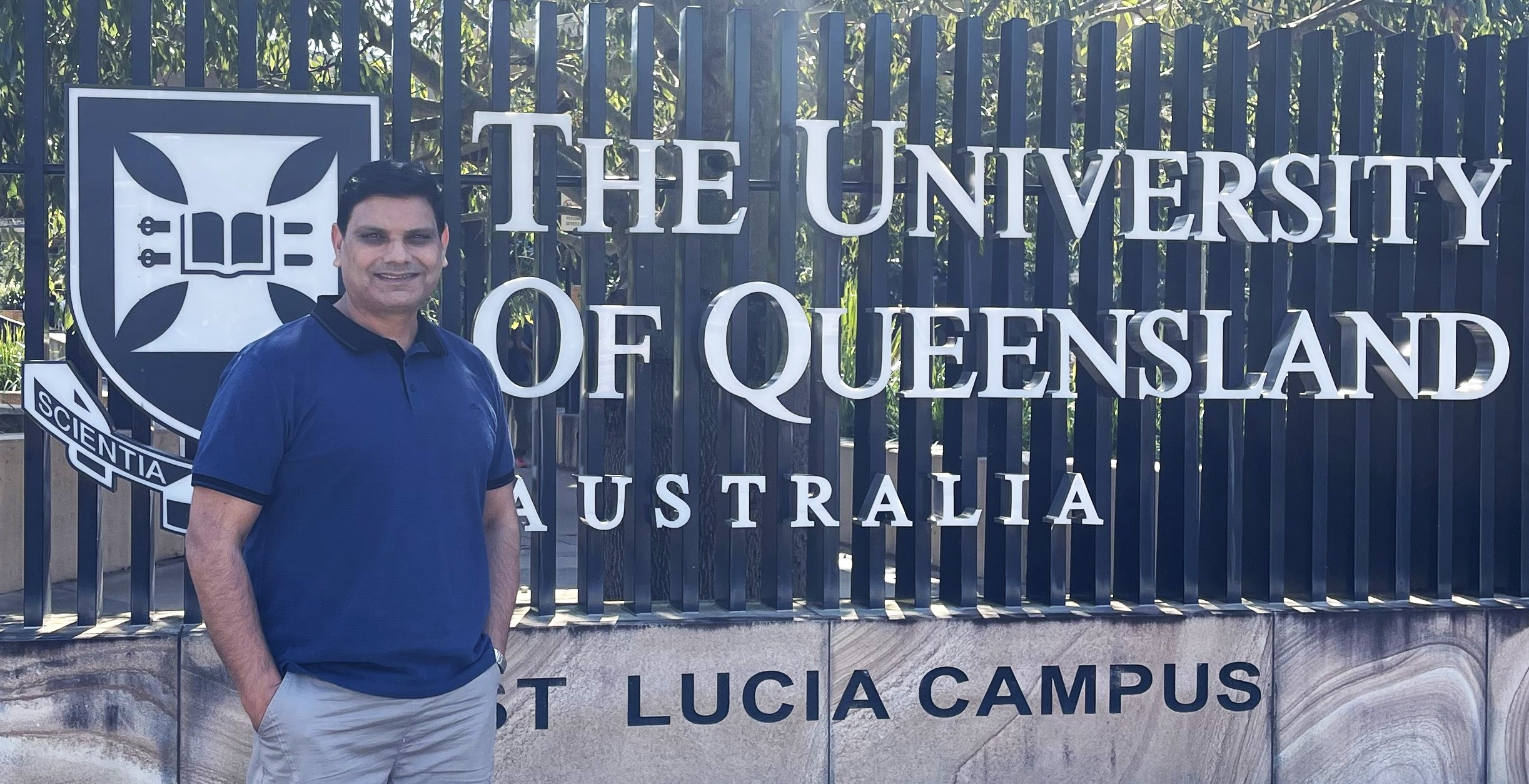
Prof. Baig at the University of Queensland in 2025

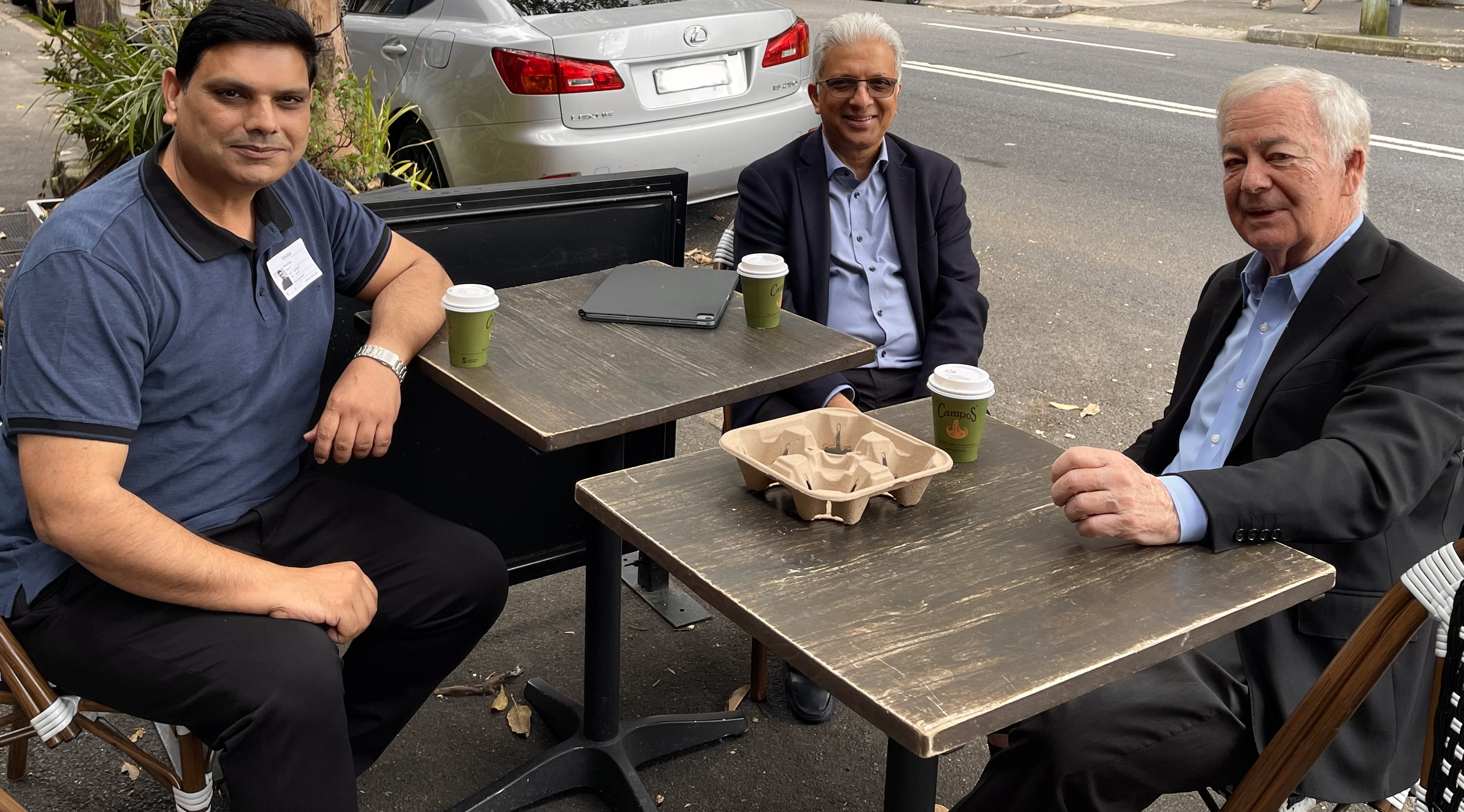
Prof. Baig with Mr. Ananth and Prof. Bob Graham in 2025

Under the Indian Council of Medical Research Visiting Professorship Program, Prof. Baig visited the University of Queensland in Brisbane in 2025 to foster Indo–Australian collaborations in the fields of chronic inflammation and cancer research. During his visit, he delivered lectures at multiple Australian universities and engaged with Infensa Bioscience on translational drug discovery initiatives. Prof. Baig has also been honored and profiled by the Australian Science Media Centre Inc (Mirza Saqib Baig - Scimex).

Professore Visitante – Università La Sapienza di Roma (2026)

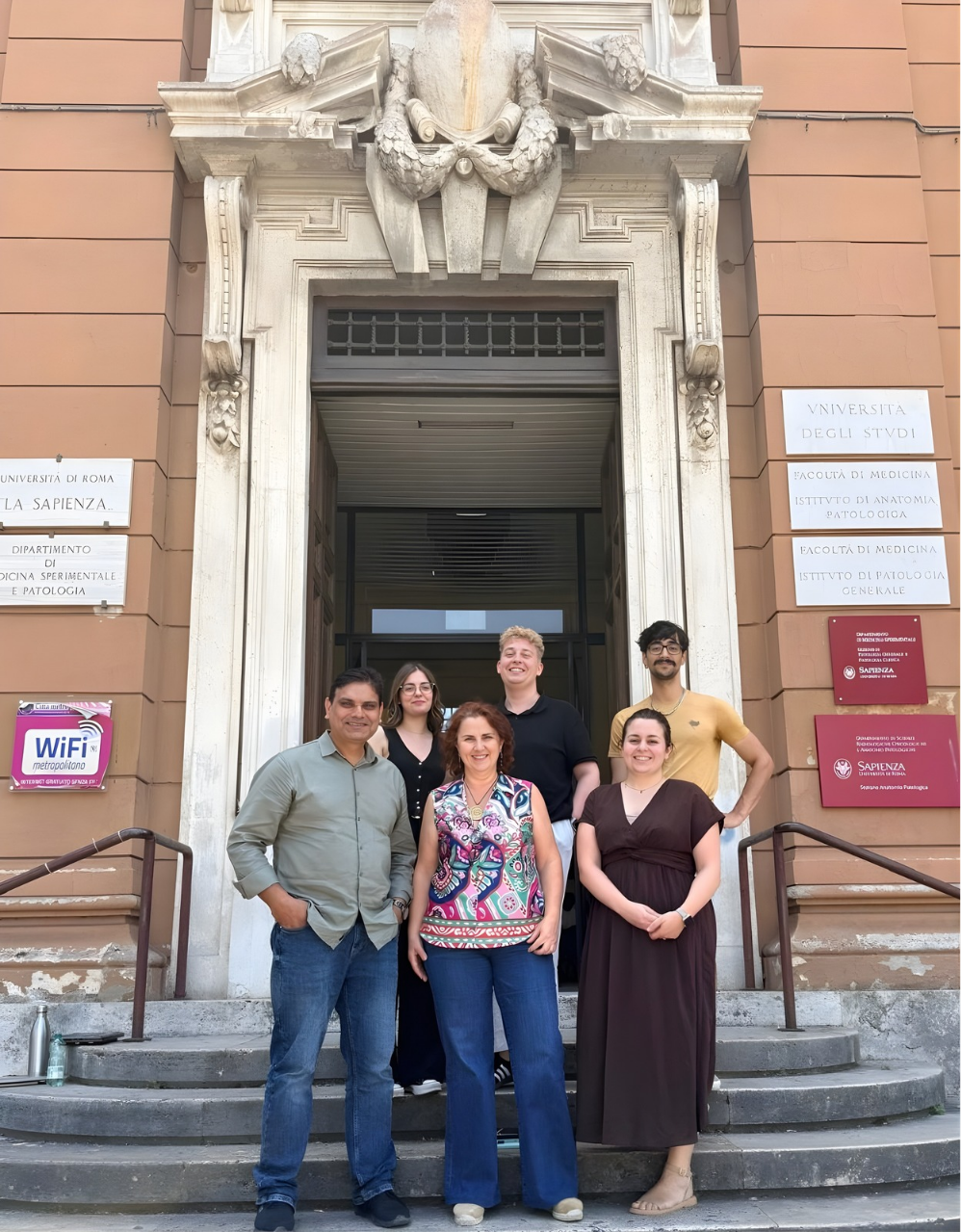
Italy 2026 - Mirza with Prof. Aurelia Rughetti and her research group

Mirza was a Visiting Professor at the Sapienza University of Rome, under the University's Visiting Professorship Program. Invited by Prof. Aurelia Rughetti, Department of Experimental Medicine, his visit focused on collaborative research in immune regulation and cancer (Visiting Professors | Sapienza Università di Roma). During his visit, Baig delivered a seminar and lectured master's and PhD students on topics related to his research expertise (SEMINARI DEL DIPARTIMENTO DI MEDICINA SPERIMENTALE: Regulatory Mechanisms of Macrophage-Mediated Inflammatory Response | MOLECULAR MEDICINE).

== Teaching ==
Baig teaches Immunology, Biochemistry, Cellular and Molecular Biology, Drug Discovery & Development at the Indian Institute of Technology in Indore.

== Professional affiliations ==
Prof. Baig is a professional member of several national and international scientific organizations, including the European Association for Cancer Research, American Society for Microbiology, Indian Science Congress Association, New York Academy of Sciences, American Heart Association, British Society for Cell Biology, and British Society for Antimicrobial Chemotherapy.
