= Oscillococcinum =

Homeopathic product

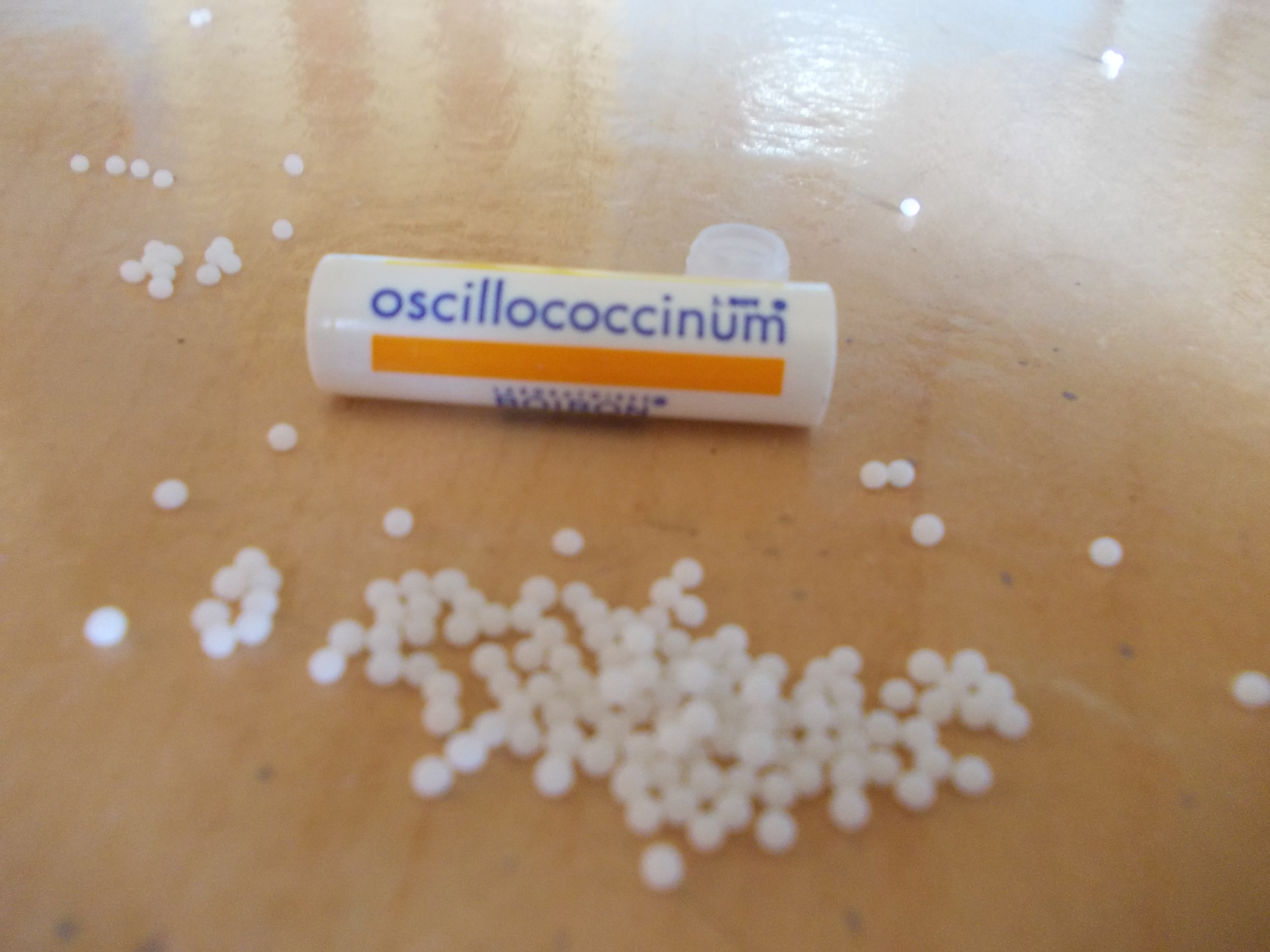
An open vial of Oscillococcinum tablets

Oscillococcinum /ˌɒsələˈkɒksɪnəm/ (or Oscillo) is a homeopathic preparation marketed to relieve flu-like symptoms, although it does not provide any benefit beyond that of a placebo.

Oscillococcinum is promoted according to the homeopathic principle that "like cures like", and that a disease can be cured by small amounts of the substance that cause similar symptoms. Boiron is its sole manufacturer. Oscillococcinum is used in more than 50 countries, being particularly popular in France, and has been in production for over 65 years.

Oscillococcinum was originally proposed by the French physician Joseph Roy (1891–1978), on the basis of his misidentification of a supposed oscillating bacterium he named oscillococcus in victims of the Spanish flu epidemic of 1917–1918. Roy said he had seen the same bacterium in cancer sufferers, and proposed a homeopathic preparation (which he claimed to have isolated in a duck) as a remedy for the Spanish flu. The microbes Roy said he saw have never been independently observed by any other researcher. In addition, it is now known that influenza is caused by a virus and not a bacterium.

The preparation is derived from duck liver and heart, diluted to 200C—a ratio of one part duck offal to 10^{400} parts water. Homeopaths claim that the molecules leave an "imprint" in the dilution that causes a healing effect on the body. There is no evidence that supports this mechanism or efficacy beyond placebo.

== Origin and history ==
The word Oscillococcinum was coined by Roy in his 1925 book Towards Knowledge and the Cure of Cancer. Roy wrote that while on military duty during the Spanish flu epidemic of 1917 he had observed an oscillating bacterium in the blood of flu victims, which he named Oscillococcus.

Roy subsequently claimed to have observed the microbe in the blood of patients that had viral diseases like herpes, chicken pox, and shingles. He thought it to be the causative agent of diseases as varied as eczema, rheumatism, tuberculosis, measles, and cancer. Roy searched for the "bacterium" in several animals until he felt that he had found it on the liver of a Long Island duckling. Believing he had also detected it in the blood of cancer patients, he tried a vaccine-like therapy on them, which was unsuccessful.

The microbe has never been independently observed by another researcher, and it remains unclear what, if anything, Roy actually saw. Moreover, medical science has since disproved Roy's "universal germ" theory: rheumatism, for example, is not caused by bacteria, and measles is caused by a virus far too small for Roy to have observed in his optical microscope.

The modern preparation is created from the heart and liver of Muscovy duck (see the preparation section for the details).

In France, the selling of all products manufactured according to the Korsakovian principle of dilution was forbidden until 1992, with the exception of Oscillo, thanks to a special measure made for it. As of 2000, Oscillococcinum was one of the top ten selling drugs in France, was publicised widely in the media, and was being prescribed for both flu and the common cold. As of 2008, sales in the United States totalled US$15 million per year; Oscillo also sells widely in Europe.

In 2019, the McGill Office for Science and Society released a survey of 150 pharmacies in Montreal, Quebec, finding that two thirds of them carried Oscillococcinum.

== Preparation ==
The ingredients of a one-gram tube of Oscillococcinum are listed as follows:

- Active ingredient: Anas Barbariae Hepatis et Cordis Extractum (extract of Muscovy duck liver and heart) 200CK HPUS 1×10^{−400} g which is much less than the mass of a proton (1.67×10^{−24} g).
- Inactive ingredient: 0.85 g sucrose, 0.15 g lactose (100% sugar).

The 200CK indicates that the preparation entails a series of 200 dilutions of the starting ingredient, an extract from the heart and liver of a Muscovy duck. Each step entails a 1:100 dilution, where the first mixture contains 1% of the extract, the second contains 1% of the first mixture, etc. The K indicates that it is prepared by the Korsakovian method, in which rather than 1% of the preparation being measured out at each stage and then diluted, a single vessel is repeatedly emptied, refilled, and vigorously shaken (in homeopathic terminology "succussed"), and it is simply assumed that 1% remains in the vessel each time. This series of dilutions would result in one molecule of the original substance being present in 10^{400} molecules of solute; for comparison, the atmosphere of the entire planet Earth is estimated to constitute around 1.04×10^{44} molecules (i.e. one molecule of duck offal per 10^{356} Earth atmospheres).

Oscillococcinum is generally considered harmless. When Boiron (the company that makes oscillococcinum) spokeswoman Gina Casey was asked if a product made from the heart and liver of a duck was safe, she replied: "Of course it is safe. There's nothing in it."

== Efficacy ==
There is no compelling scientific evidence that Oscillococcinum has any effect beyond placebo. None of its active ingredient is present in a dose of the final product, nor is there any credible evidence that duck liver is effective in relieving (or causing) flu symptoms in the first place. Homeopaths claim the diluted molecules leave an "imprint" in the remedy, but there is no known mechanism for how this could occur. Homeopathy as a whole is widely considered to be pseudoscience.

As Robert L. Park, a critic of alternative medicine, explains, some of the characteristics of flu may suggest that Oscillococcinum works. Since the flu normally goes away on its own in a variable number of days, the natural course of the disease is a potential source of error in assessing the efficacy of any intervention: if one takes any medication, and then one's flu goes away, there is a tendency to attribute this to the medication even though the infection would have resolved anyway, which is an example of the informal fallacy post hoc ergo propter hoc. Someone who gets over a mild strain of flu may attribute the mildness to the efficacy of the homeopathic preparation and not to the fact that it was a mild strain, and might recommend it to other people, spreading its popularity. Also, the most likely explanation for its effectiveness with flu symptoms is that patients are misdiagnosing the symptoms of several rhinovirus diseases or of allergies to several hundred substances, and attributing them to a flu infection that they do not have.

A 2005 review of flu treatments (vaccine, medicine, homeopathy) concluded that the popularity of Oscillococcinum in France was unsupported by any evidence of efficacy. In a 2007 review, the effectiveness of non-mainstream remedies against seasonal flu could not be established beyond reasonable doubt, and the evidence was found to be sparse and limited by "small sample sizes, low methodological quality, or clinically irrelevant effect sizes", and that the results strengthened using conventional approaches for treating flu. A Cochrane review published in December 2015 found that there was insufficient evidence to make a conclusion about whether Oscillococcinum was useful for influenza.

== Lawsuits and criticisms ==
The non-profit educational organizations Center for Inquiry (CFI) and the associated Committee for Skeptical Inquiry (CSI) have petitioned the U.S. Food and Drug Administration (FDA), criticizing Boiron for misleading labeling and advertising of Oscillococcinum. "One petition complains that Boiron's packaging for Oscillococcinum lists the alleged active ingredient – duck liver and heart – in Latin only. Another petition complains that Boiron's web ad for this product implies that it has received FDA approval." Ronald Lindsay, CFI and CSI president and chief executive officer, contended that, "If Boiron is going to sell snake oil, the least they can do is use English on their labels."

A class action lawsuit was filed against Boiron on behalf of "all California residents who purchased Oscillo at any time within the past four years". The lawsuit charged that Boiron "falsely advertises that Oscillo has the ability to cure the flu because it contains an active ingredient it claims is proven to get rid of flu symptoms in 48 hours". The lawsuit also stated that the listed active ingredient in Oscillococcinum (Oscillo) "is actually Muscovy Duck Liver and Heart ... and has no known medicinal quality." A settlement was reached, with Boiron denying any wrongdoing and agreeing to make several changes to its marketing of the product. These changes included adding to their packaging notices like "These 'Uses' have not been evaluated by the Food and Drug Administration" and "C, K, CK, and X are homeopathic dilutions."

Since 2011, at least two class action lawsuits on behalf of customers who purchased Oscillococcinum have been filed against Boiron in the United States, alleging that Boiron falsely advertises that Oscillo has the ability to cure the flu. A proposed settlement was reached in August 2012. While the settlement was challenged in the U.S. Court of Appeals for the Ninth Circuit by one class member who opposed the settlement, on February 24, 2015, the Ninth Circuit issued a decision upholding approval of the class action settlement.

Boiron's legal threats against Samuele Riva for writing criticisms on his website were rebuffed by his web hosting company, and the debacle was described as producing a Streisand effect against Boiron.
