= IITR =

"IITR" may refer to:

- Indian Institute of Technology, Roorkee
- Indian Institute of Toxicology Research
