= ITRC =

ITRC may refer to:

- Indian Institute of Toxicology Research
- Irish Tarmac Rally Championship
