= Water (2006 film) =

2006 Russian TV film by Anastaysia Popova

- DVD Cover
- Written by: Marina Daynovets; Mikhail Vayger; Andrey Medvedev; Vsevolod Lisovsky
- Directed by: Anastaysia Popova
- Starring: Masaru Emoto; Leonid Izvekov; Vlail Kaznacheyev; Kurt Wüthrich
- Narrated by: Sergey Chonishvili
- Country of origin: Russia
- Original language: Russian

Production
- Producers: Saida Medvedeva; Vasily Anisimov; Sergey Shumakov
- Cinematography: Oleg Kirichenko
- Running time: 82 minutes

Original release
- Release: April 9, 2006

Water (Russian: Вода), also released as The Great Mystery of Water (Russian: Великая тайна воды) is a 2006 pseudoscientific documentary television film directed by Anastaysia Popova about the memory of water. The film was part of television channel Rossiya 1's project The Great Mystery of Water.

In the film, scientists and pseudoscientists from various countries (including Kurt Wüthrich, Masaru Emoto, Rustum Roy, and Konstantin Korotkov) present their work on the theme of water. Additionally, clergy from major religions (including Metropolit of Smolensk Kirill, Shamil Alyautdinov, and Pinchas Polonsky) discuss the importance of water in their faith. The film also presents experiences of water, including the emotions of humans interacting with the water (using kirlian photography).

In November 2006 the film won three television awards at TEFI, including for the best documentary film.

Water faced sharp criticism from the Russian scientific community, which condemned the movie as pseudoscience.

Wüthrich distanced himself from the film, saying that although he was interviewed, his statements were taken out of context. He was not informed that the interview was to be used for a film. He later wrote: "It is much more problematic that the film, by presenting a Nobel Prize winner, suggests to the viewer that the nonsense presented is actually scientific consensus."

== Claims ==
Water includes many pseudoscientific and dubious claims, including:

- Water has the highest surface tension of all liquids.
- Water is the most powerful solvent on earth.
- In 1956, in a secret military lab in southeast Asia, scientists were discussing a new biological weapon of mass destruction. All of the scientists present were hospitalized with food poisoning after drinking plain water. The film implies that the water decided to poison them.
- Water has memory. It reacts to and remembers emotions, violence (such as the violence of traveling many miles to reach us), curse words, and more.
- Jesus Christ turned water into wine.
- One and a half liters of water is absorbed through the skin when we take a shower or bath.
- Frequency of serious crimes correlate to the times people curse in those areas.
- Water accumulates informational pollution as it flows through pipes.
- Images of all future organisms were present in the water. The impulse for life to arise was a primordial divine spark.
- Water reacts to religious words by forming beautiful crystals.
