= Interdisciplinary Sciences: Computational Life Sciences =

Scientific journal

- Discipline: Computational science, life sciences
- Language: English
- Edited by: Dong-Qing Wei

Publication details
- History: 2009—present
- Publisher: Springer
- Frequency: Quarterly
- Impact factor: 3.9 (2024)

Standard abbreviations
- ISO 4: Interdiscip. Sci.: Comput. Life Sci.

Indexing
- CODEN: ISCLAL
- ISSN: 1913-2751 (print); 1867-1462 (web)

Links
- Journal homepage; Online access; Online archive

Interdisciplinary Sciences: Computational Life Sciences is a peer-reviewed scientific journal published quarterly by Springer Science+Business Media on behalf of International Association of Scientists in the Interdisciplinary Areas. It covers developments in interdisciplinary areas of sciences with a focus on computational life sciences. It was established in 2009 and its current editor-in-chief is Dong-Qing Wei (Shanghai Jiao Tong University).

The journal was subject to controversy due to Luc Montagnier's 2009 publications on DNA teleportation, which were characterized as pseudoscience. It was criticized for its peer review system and the unusually short turnaround time for these publications; Montagnier served as the chairman of the editorial board at the time.

== Abstracting and indexing ==
The journal is abstracted and indexed in:

- Biological Abstracts
- BIOSIS Previews
- ProQuest databases
- Science Citation Index Expanded
- Scopus

According to the Journal Citation Reports, the journal has a 2024 impact factor of 3.9.
