= Water memory =

Refuted theory behind homeopathic remedies

Water memory is the purported ability of water to retain a memory of substances previously dissolved in it even after an arbitrary number of serial dilutions. It has been claimed to be a mechanism by which homeopathic remedies work, even when they are diluted to the point that no molecule of the original substance remains, but there is no theory for it.

Water memory is pseudoscientific in nature; it contradicts the scientific understanding of physical chemistry and is generally not accepted by the scientific community. In 1988, Jacques Benveniste and colleagues published a study supporting a water memory effect amid controversy in Nature, accompanied by an editorial by Nature's editor John Maddox urging readers to "suspend judgement" until the results could be replicated. In the years after publication, multiple supervised experiments were made by Benveniste's team, the United States Department of Defense, BBC's Horizon programme, and other researchers, but no one has ever reproduced Benveniste's results under controlled conditions.

== Benveniste's study ==
Jacques Benveniste was a French immunologist who sought to demonstrate the plausibility of homeopathic remedies "independently of homeopathic interests" in a major scientific journal. To that end, Benveniste and his team at Institut National de la Santé et de la Recherche Médicale (INSERM, French for National Institute of Health and Medical Research) diluted a solution of human antibodies in water to such a degree that there was virtually no possibility that a single molecule of the antibody remained in the water solution.

Nonetheless, they reported, human basophils responded to the solutions just as though they had encountered the original antibody (part of the allergic reaction). The effect was reported only when the solution was shaken violently during dilution. Benveniste stated: "It's like agitating a car key in the river, going miles downstream, extracting a few drops of water, and then starting one's car with the water." At the time, Benveniste offered no theoretical explanation for the effect, which was later coined as "water memory" by a journalist reporting on the study.

=== Implications ===
While Benveniste's study demonstrated a mechanism by which homeopathic remedies could operate, the mechanism defied scientific understanding of physical chemistry. A paper about hydrogen bond dynamics is mentioned by some secondary sources in connection to the implausibility of water memory.

=== Publication in Nature ===
Benveniste submitted his research to the prominent science journal Nature for publication. There was concern on the part of Nature's editorial oversight board that the material, if published, would lend credibility to homeopathic practitioners even if the effects were not replicable. There was equal concern that the research was simply wrong, given the changes that it would demand of the known laws of physics and chemistry. The editor of Nature, John Maddox, stated that, "Our minds were not so much closed as unready to change our whole view of how science is constructed." Rejecting the paper on any objective grounds was deemed unsupportable, as there were no methodological flaws apparent at the time.

In the end, a compromise was reached. The paper was published in Nature Vol. 333 on 30 June 1988, but it was accompanied with an editorial by Maddox that noted "There are good and particular reasons why prudent people should, for the time being, suspend judgement" and described some of the fundamental laws of chemistry and physics which it would violate, if shown to be true. Additionally, Maddox demanded that the experiments be re-run under the supervision of a hand-picked group of what became known as "ghostbusters", including Maddox, famed magician and paranormal researcher James Randi, and Walter W. Stewart, a chemist and freelance debunker at the U.S. National Institutes of Health.

== Post-publication supervised experiments ==
Under supervision of Maddox and his team, Benveniste and his team of researchers followed the original study's procedure and produced results similar to those of the first published data. Maddox, however, noted that during the procedure, the experimenters were aware of which test tubes originally contained the antibodies and which did not. Benveniste's team then started a second, blinded experimental series with Maddox and his team in charge of the double-blinding: notebooks were photographed, the lab videotaped, and vials juggled and secretly coded. Randi even went so far as to wrap the labels in newspaper, seal them in an envelope, and then stick them on the ceiling. This was done so that Benveniste and his team could not read them. The blinded experimental series showed no water memory effect.

Maddox's team published a report on the supervised experiments in the next issue (July 1988) of Nature. Maddox's team concluded "that there is no substantial basis for the claim that anti-IgE at high dilution (by factors as great as 10^{120}) retains its biological effectiveness, and that the hypothesis that water can be imprinted with the memory of past solutes is as unnecessary as it is fanciful." Maddox's team initially speculated that someone in the lab "was playing a trick on Benveniste", but later concluded that, "We believe the laboratory has fostered and then cherished a delusion about the interpretation of its data." Maddox also pointed out that two of Benveniste's researchers were being paid by the French homeopathic company Boiron.

=== Aftermath ===
In a response letter published in the same July issue of Nature, Benveniste lashed out at Maddox and complained about the "ordeal" that he had endured at the hands of the Nature team, comparing it to "Salem witchhunts or McCarthy-like prosecutions". Both in the Nature response and during a later episode of Quirks and Quarks, Benveniste especially complained about Stewart, who he claimed acted as if they were all frauds and treated them with disdain, complaining about his "typical know-it-all attitude". In his Nature letter, Benveniste also implied that Randi was attempting to hoodwink the experimental run by doing magic tricks, "distracting the technician in charge of its supervision!" He was more apologetic on Quirks and Quarks, re-phrasing his mention of Randi to imply that he had kept the team amused with his tricks and that his presence was generally welcomed. He also pointed out that although it was true two of his team members were being paid by a homeopathic company, the same company had paid Maddox's team's hotel bill.

Maddox was unapologetic, stating "I'm sorry we didn't find something more interesting." On the same Quirks and Quarks show, he dismissed Benveniste's complaints, stating that, because of the possibility that the results would be unduly promoted by the homeopathy community, an immediate re-test was necessary. The failure of the tests demonstrated that the initial results were likely due to the experimenter effect. He also pointed out that the entire test procedure, that Benveniste later complained about, was one that had been agreed upon in advance by all parties. It was only after the test had failed that Benveniste disputed its appropriateness.

The debate continued in the letters section of Nature for several issues before being ended by the editorial board. It continued in the French press for some time, and in September Benveniste appeared on the British television discussion programme After Dark to debate the events live with Randi and others. In spite of all the arguing over the retests, it had done nothing to stop what Maddox worried about: even in light of the tests' failure, they were still being used to claim that the experiments "prove" that homeopathy works. One of Benveniste's co-authors on the Nature paper, Francis Beauvais, later stated that while unblinded experimental trials usually yielded "correct" results (i.e. ultradiluted samples were biologically active, controls were not), "the results of blinded samples were almost always at random and did not fit the expected results: some 'controls' were active and some 'active' samples were without effect on the biological system."

== Subsequent research ==
In the cold fusion or polywater controversies, many scientists started replications immediately, because the underlying theories did not go directly against scientific fundamental principles and could be accommodated with a few tweaks to those principles. But Benveniste's experiment went directly against several principles, causing most researchers to outright reject the results as errors or fabrication, with only a few researchers willing to perform replications or experiments that could validate or reject his hypotheses.

After the Nature controversy, Benveniste gained the public support of Brian Josephson, a Nobel laureate physicist with a reputation for openness to paranormal claims. Experiments continued along the same basic lines, culminating with a 1997 paper claiming the effect could be transmitted over phone lines. This was followed by two additional papers in 1999 and another from 2000, in the controversial non-peer reviewed Medical Hypotheses, on remote-transmission, by which time it was claimed that it could also be sent over the Internet.

Time magazine reported in 1999 that, in response to skepticism from physicist Robert Park, Josephson had challenged the American Physical Society (APS) to oversee a replication by Benveniste. This challenge was to be "a randomized double-blind test", of his claimed ability to transfer the characteristics of homeopathically altered solutions over the Internet:

[Benveniste's] latest theory, and the cause of the current flap, is that the "memory" of water in a homeopathic solution has an electromagnetic "signature." This signature, he says, can be captured by a copper coil, digitized and transmitted by wire—or, for extra flourish, over the Internet—to a container of ordinary water, converting it to a homeopathic solution.

The APS accepted the challenge and offered to cover the costs of the test. When he heard of this, Randi offered to throw in the long-standing $1 million prize for any positive demonstration of the paranormal, to which Benveniste replied: "Fine to us." In his DigiBio NewsLetter. Randi later noted that Benveniste and Josephson did not follow up on their challenge, mocking their silence on the topic as if they were missing persons.

An independent test of the 2000 remote-transmission experiment was carried out in the US by a team funded by the United States Department of Defense. Using the same experimental devices and setup as the Benveniste team, they failed to find any effect when running the experiment. Several "positive" results were noted, but only when a particular one of Benveniste's researchers was running the equipment. "We did not observe systematic influences such as pipetting differences, contamination, or violations in blinding or randomization that would explain these effects from the Benveniste investigator. However, our observations do not exclude these possibilities."

Benveniste admitted to having noticed this himself. "He stated that certain individuals consistently get digital effects and other individuals get no effects or block those effects."

Third-party attempts at replication of the Benveniste experiment to date have failed to produce positive results that could be independently replicated. In 1993, Nature published a paper describing a number of follow-up experiments that failed to find a similar effect, and an independent study published in Experientia in 1992 showed no effect. An international team led by Madeleine Ennis of Queen's University of Belfast claimed in 1999 to have replicated the Benveniste results. Randi then forwarded the $1 million challenge to the BBC Horizon program to prove the "water memory" theory following Ennis's experimental procedure. In response, experiments were conducted with the vice-president of the Royal Society, John Enderby, overseeing the proceedings. The challenge ended with no memory effect observed by the Horizon team. For a piece on homeopathy, the ABC program 20/20 also attempted, unsuccessfully, to reproduce Ennis's results. Ennis has claimed that these tests did not follow her own experiment protocols.

== Other scientists ==
In 2003, Louis Rey, a chemist from Lausanne, reported that frozen samples of lithium and sodium chloride solutions prepared according to homeopathic prescriptions showed – after being exposed to radiation – different thermoluminescence peaks compared with pure water. Rey claimed that this suggested that the networks of hydrogen bonds in homeopathic dilutions were different. These results have never been replicated and are not generally accepted - even Benveniste criticised them, pointing out that they were not blinded.

In January 2009, Luc Montagnier, the Nobel Laureate virologist who led the team that discovered the human immunodeficiency virus (HIV), claimed (in a paper published in a journal that he set up, which seems to have avoided conventional peer review as it was accepted three days after submission) that the DNA of pathogenic bacteria and viruses massively diluted in water emit radio waves that he can detect. The device used to detect these signals was developed by Jacques Benveniste, and was independently tested, with the co-operation of the Benveniste team, at the request of the United States Defense Advanced Research Projects Agency. That investigation was unable to replicate any effects of digital signals using the device.

In 2010, at the age of 78, Montagnier announced that he would take on the leadership of a new research institute at Jiaotong University in Shanghai, where he plans to continue this work. He claims that the findings "are very reproducible and we are waiting for confirmation by other labs", but said, in an interview with Science, "There is a kind of fear around this topic in Europe. I am told that some people have reproduced Benveniste's results, but they are afraid to publish it because of the intellectual terror from people who don't understand it." Montagnier had called Benveniste "a modern Galileo", but the problem was that "his results weren't 100% reproducible".

== Homeopathic coverage ==
To most scientists, the "memory of water" is not something that deserves serious consideration; the only evidence is the flawed Benveniste work. By contrast, the notion of "memory of water" has been taken seriously among homeopaths. For them, it seemed to explain how some of their remedies might work. An overview of the issues surrounding the memory of water was the subject of a special issue of Homeopathy. In an editorial, the editor of Homeopathy, Peter Fisher, acknowledged that Benveniste's original method does not yield reproducible results and declared "...the memory of water is a bad memory: it casts a long shadow over homeopathy and is just about all that many scientists recall about the scientific investigation of homeopathy, equating it with poor or even fraudulent science." The issue was an attempt to restore some credibility to the notion with articles proposing various, very different theories of water memory, such as electromagnetic exchange of information between molecules, breaking of temporal symmetry, thermoluminescence, entanglement described by a new quantum theory, formation of hydrogen peroxide, clathrate formation, etc. Some of the proposed mechanisms would require overthrowing much of 20th-century physics.

== See also ==
- Hexagonal water
- DNA teleportation
- List of experimental errors and frauds in physics
- List of topics characterized as pseudoscience
- Pathological science
- Pseudoscience
- Scientific misconduct
- Masaru Emoto
- Homeopathic dilutions
