= Beyond Words Publishing =

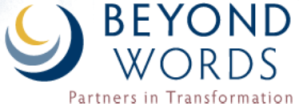
- Status: Active
- Founded: 1983; 43 years ago
- Founder: Richard Cohn; Bob Goodman; Cindy Black
- Country of origin: United States
- Headquarters location: Portland, Oregon; 45°32′23″N 122°53′33″W
- Key people: Richard Cohn; Cindy Black
- Publication types: Books
- Nonfiction topics: New Age
- Fiction genres: Non-fiction
- Official website: www.beyondword.com

Beyond Words Publishing is a book publishing company located in Portland, Oregon, United States. Founded in 1983, the company was unprofitable in its early years, though its works were award-winning. The privately owned company focuses on non-fiction titles in the New Age genre (now generally referred to as mind-body-spirit category), but began as a publisher of coffee table books. Beyond Words has a national distribution agreement with Simon & Schuster's Atria Books imprint and has published works by John Gray, Masaru Emoto, and Rhonda Byrne, including her book The Secret.

== History ==
Beyond Words Publishing was founded in 1983 by Richard Cohn, Bob Goodman, and Cindy Black in Hawaii. Black and Cohn later married. The company started after Cohn's family sold Cohn Bros. furniture company to McMahan's Furniture in 1982 and Cohn was looking for a new direction.

The company's first book, Within a Rainbowed Sea, came out in 1984. The coffee table book won 11 awards at the New York Art Directors Show and was named the most outstanding book of the year by the Printing Industries of America in 1984. Focused on images of sea life by Christopher Newbert, the book is hound bound using Niger goatskin and kept in a box made of koa wood and lined with Brazilian suede. Sold for $2,250, the book was given to Japanese Emperor Hirohito on his 80th birthday by then U.S. President Ronald Reagan. A calendar featuring the images took second place in a Printing Industries of America competition in 1988. As of 1988 there were four editions and 52,000 copies of the book.

The company's second book was Molokai: An Island in Time by photographer Richard Cooke III; it came out in 1985.

The publishing company relocated to Oregon in 1986 where it was incorporated, and by 1988 Bob Goodman had left the company, which had failed to turn a profit after putting out 12 titles. Beyond Words settled on Cohn's 12-acre (4.9 ha) farm near Hillsboro.

Both of the first two books were printed by Oregon printer Dynagraphics, Inc., with printing costs exceeding $500,000 for the books that were to retail for $2,000 each. Beyond Words had an exclusive distribution with Waldenbooks for the first two titles, but the deal later fell through. The company was left deeply in debt after these two books, with founder Black taking a job to help pay off the debt. In October 1988, a lawsuit between the printer Dynagraphics and U. S. National Bank concerned Beyond Words' ability to pay its bill to Dynagraphics for the printing. Dynagraphics won the lawsuit for $321,000 when the jury decided that the bank had a duty to warn Dynagraphics that co-owner Cohn lacked the funds to pay for the printing of the two books that were part of their Earthsong Project.

The company published The American Eagle, a 128-page coffee table book in 1988 by Tom and Pat Leeson. Books by the company in the early years revolved around New Age philosophy and themes.

In 1990, they were the first publishers of works by author and therapist John Gray, printing Men, Women and Relationships. Gray then went to another company with Beyond Words' blessing, and published Men Are From Mars, Women Are From Venus.

In 1994, the headquarters were moved to Hillsboro near the airport as the company had expanded to 12 employees.

By 1995, Beyond Words was publishing around ten books per year and expanded from coffee table books into titles concerning Native American wisdom, health, personal growth, and children's literature. Sales at that time totaled $1.8 million per year. To drive sales, the company was innovative with marketing, with activities such as promoting books at tourist attractions like zoos, selling through fundraisers, and co-marketing with other publishers. Beyond Words partnered with Flying Rhino Productions in 1995.

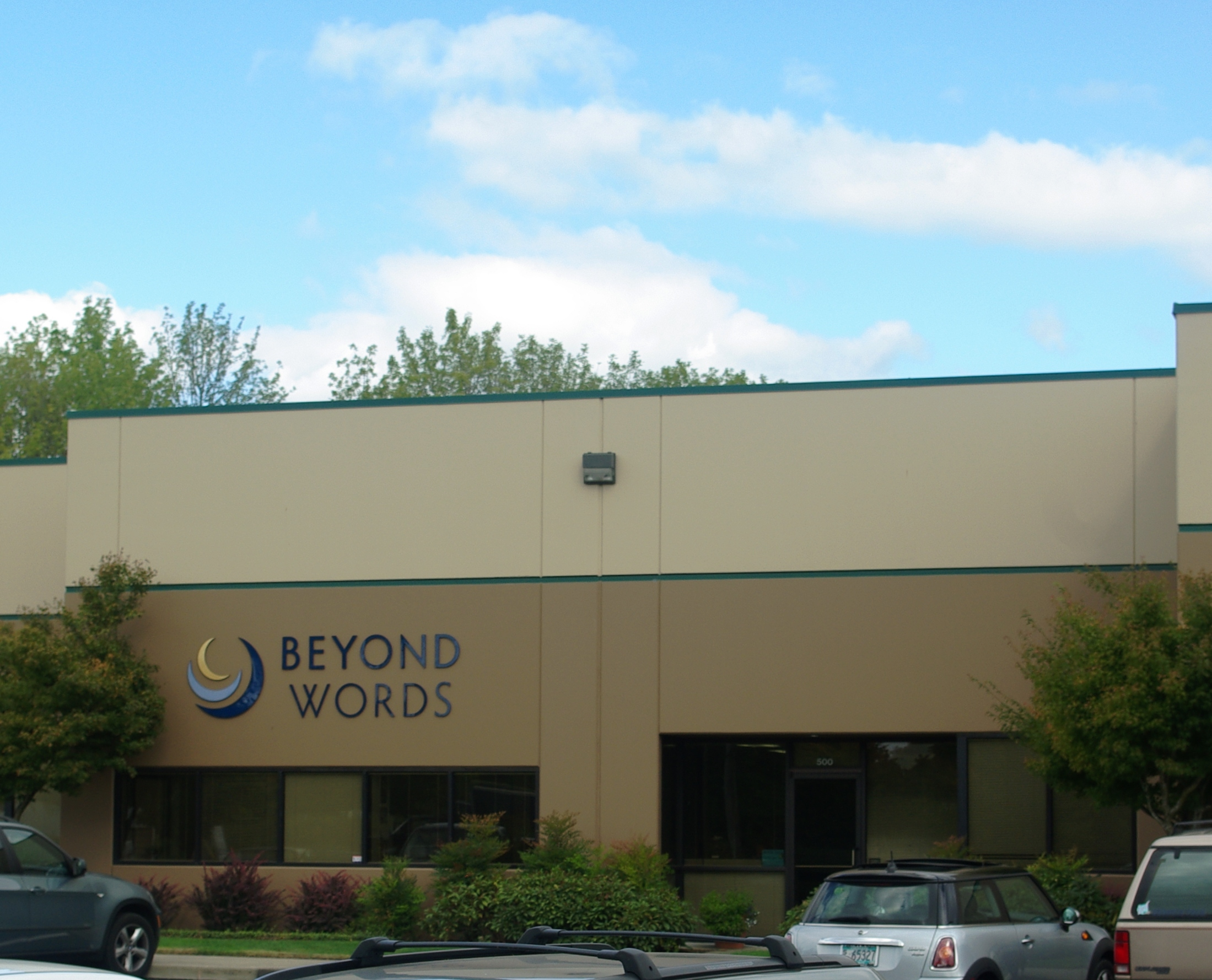
Company headquarters in Hillsboro

Beyond Words moved into an office along Cornell Road in the Tanasbourne neighborhood of Hillsboro in 2006. In 2004, the company was struggling and considered filing for bankruptcy protection until a new investor was brought on board. That year, Beyond Words had its first big success, after more than 250 titles to their name, with Masaru Emoto's Hidden Messages of Water. The book sold enough to make the New York Times Best Seller list and sold a total of half a million copies. The company started a partnership with publisher Simon & Schuster's subsidiary Atria Books in 2006.

That same year, the company had a dinner party where one of the commentators from The Secret DVD convinced the group to watch the video, which led to the publication of the book, The Secret by Rhonda Byrne. By March 2007, the book had become the top seller on Amazon.com as well as appearing on The New York Times bestseller list, and had 1.75 million copies in print. That month Simon & Schuster ordered an additional 2 million copies, the largest reorder in their history. By 2003, The Secret had over five million copies in hardcover.

=== Founders ===
Richard Cohn grew up in Oregon in Northeast Portland before he attended Stanford University and the Paul H. Nitze School of Advanced International Studies at Johns Hopkins University. He then entered the family's furniture business, where he worked for 13 years. He was divorced in 1976, and met co-founder Cindy Black in 1982 in Hawaii after the family business was sold. They moved in together and later married. A fortune teller had foretold of the meeting, and that he would move to Hawaii. Both Cohn and Black took a New Age class at the Burklyn Business School in California, which helped lay the foundation for starting Beyond Words. In Hawaii, Cohn met a photographer who knew his sister, and with publisher Bob Goodman started a publishing company to produce the photographer's work.

The founders divorced in 2008 but continue on as business partners.

== Operations ==
Privately held Beyond Words is headquartered in the Hillsboro, Oregon, in the Portland metropolitan area. The company publishes 15 new books every year, mainly in the New Age, non-fiction genre through their partnership with Atria Books. Independently they are wholesalers of their titles for international distribution, and operate Beyond Distribution as a subsidiary for releases of other media such as videos. The company has its editors, designers, and printers work with each author, which is atypical in the publishing world. Their philosophy helped turn the company into a "national leader", or as Susan Reich of Publishers Group West stated, "They are one of a few independent publishers who can do beautiful photography books, very finely produced."

== Selected titles ==
- Patent, Arnold M. (1995). You Can Have It All. ISBN 1-885223-05-6.
- Ealy, C. Diane (1996). The Woman's Book of Creativity. ISBN 0-7171-2414-2.
- Foggia, Lyla (1995). Reel Women: The World of Women Who Fish. ISBN 1-885223-18-8.
- Gardner, Carol W. (1995). Bumper Sticker Wisdom: America's Pulpit Above the Tailpipe. ISBN 1-885223-32-3.
- Coon, Nora (2003). Teen Dream Jobs: How to Find the Job You Really Want Now!. ISBN 1-58270-093-1.
- Mildon, Emma (2015). The Soul Searcher's Handbook A Modern Girl's Guide to the New Age World. ISBN 978-1-58270-524-8.
- Michelle Roehm McCann; Marianne Monson (1999). Girls Know Best. ISBN 1-885223-84-6.
