= The Hidden Messages in Water =

2004 book by Masaru Emoto

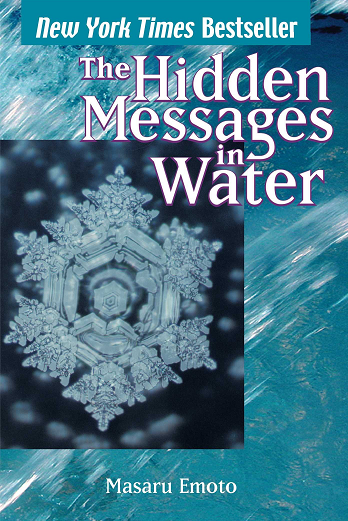
- Author: Masaru Emoto
- Language: English
- Genre: Body Mind & Spirit; Pseudoscience
- Publisher: Beyond Words Pub.
- Publication date: 2004
- Publication place: United States
- Media type: Print
- Pages: 159
- ISBN: 978-1-58-270114-1

The Hidden Messages in Water is a 2004 New York Times Bestseller book, written by Masaru Emoto advancing the pseudoscientific idea that the molecular structure of water is changed by the presence of human consciousness nearby, backed by "exhaustive and wildly unscientific research" claiming to back this conjecture.

== Criticism ==
William Reville, professor of biochemistry at University College Cork writing in the Irish Times, described The Hidden Messages in Water as a work of pseudoscience, and characterized the book as "an amalgam of science and mumbo-jumbo" with "no credible hypothesis as to causation, no development of the idea, no fruitfulness in the concept, and, above all, no clear scientific demonstration". He concluded by stating that "It is very unlikely that there is any reality behind Emoto's claims. A triple blind study of these claims failed to show any effect. Also, the phenomenon he describes has never been published in a peer reviewed science journal, which almost certainly means that the effect cannot be demonstrated under controlled conditions." Physicist Kenneth Libbrecht, an expert on snow, also saw the book as displaying confirmation bias, joking that "it's good to have an open mind, but not so open that your brains fall out!"

Harriet Hall wrote for the Skeptical Inquirer that the book "holds a place of honor on my bookshelves as the worst book I have ever read. It is about as scientific as Alice in Wonderland. Emoto took pictures of snowflakes and 'observed' that clean water made prettier crystals." Upon the book becoming a New York Times Bestseller, literary critic Dwight Garner wrote in The New York Times Book Review that "it was one of those 'head-scratchers' that made him question the sanity of the reading public."
