= Walter W. Stewart (scientist) =

American biochemical scientist

Walter W. Stewart (born c. 1945) is an American biomedical scientist who worked at the National Institute of Health in Bethesda, Maryland. Working at the National Institute of Arthritis, Metabolism and Digestive Diseases, he invented Lucifer yellow, a fluorescent dye used for visualizing cells under microscope, in 1979. In 1971, he had also isolated and worked out the chemical structure of tabtoxin, or wildfire toxin, an antibiotic precursor from the bacterium Pseudomonas syringae. He is most popularly known for his efforts in maintaining scientific integrity by fighting against important cases of malpractices. He accompanied James Randi in debunking homeopathic experiment perpetrated by French immunologist Jacques Benveniste in an incident known as the Benveniste affair in 1988.

== The Baltimore case ==
David Baltimore was a microbiologist at Massachusetts Institute of Technology (MIT) who received the 1975 Nobel Prize for Physiology or Medicine (along with Howard Temin and Renato Dulbecco) for the "discoveries concerning the interaction between tumor viruses and the genetic material of the cell." Since 1981, he collaborated with Brazilian immunologist Thereza Imanishi-Kari at the Institute for Genetics in University of Cologne, Germany. By the next year, Imanishi-Kari joined him at MIT and worked on mutations in immunoglobulins. In 1986, Baltimore and Imanishi-Kari's team published a paper in the journal Cell on rearrangement of immunoglobin gene and the effects in transgenic mice.

Margot O'Toole, a post-doctoral researcher at MIT claimed that she could not reproduce the same experimental results and accused Imanishi-Kari of fabricating research data. When Charles Maplethorpe, a former graduate student with Imanishi-Kari, learned of this, he took the matter to Stewart and his colleague Ned Feder, who had specialised in dealing with research frauds. Stewart and Feder reanalysed the laboratory data and the published paper, and found not just small mistakes but "concluded that the published paper contained a number of serious misrepresentations of scientific fact." With permission from the NIH, they submitted their findings to MIT and Tufts University, where Imanishi-Kari had moved. As the universities took no action, Stewart and Feder informed the case to John Dingell, a member of the United States House of Representatives. As the research was funded by the U.S. federal government, the case was taken up by the United States Congress. Dingell, as chairman of the House's Energy Subcommittee on Oversight and Investigations, pursued the case.

In 1991, Imanishi-Kari was accused of data falsification and barred from research grants for 10 years. Baltimore was prompted to resign as president of the Rockefeller University for assisting and defending Imanishi-Kari. Cell retracted the paper. In 1994, however, OSI's successor, the Office of Research Integrity found Imanishi-Kari guilty on 19 counts of research misconduct, but was cleared of the charges in 1996.
