= Masaru Emoto =

Japanese pseudoscientist (1943–2014)

- 江本勝
- Born: July 22, 1943; Yokohama, Japan
- Died: October 17, 2014 (aged 71); Japan
- Education: Yokohama City University
- Spouse: Kazuko Emoto (江本和子)

Masaru Emoto (Japanese: 江本 勝, Hepburn: Emoto Masaru; July 22, 1943 – October 17, 2014) was a Japanese businessman, author and pseudoscientist who claimed that human consciousness could affect the molecular structure of water. His 2004 book The Hidden Messages in Water was a New York Times best seller. His ideas had evolved over the years, and his early work revolved around pseudoscientific hypotheses that water could react to positive thoughts and words and that polluted water could be cleaned through prayer and positive visualization.

Starting in 1999, Emoto published several volumes of a work entitled Messages from Water, containing photographs of ice crystals and accompanying experiments such as that of the "rice in water 30 day experiment."

== Biography ==
Emoto was born in Yokohama and graduated from Yokohama City University after taking courses in International Relations. He worked in the Nagoya Office (Central Japan Office) of the Yomiuri Shimbun newspaper, then founded the International Health Medical company in 1986. In 1989, he received exclusive rights to market the Magnetic Resonance Analyzer, a device patented by Ronald Weinstock (Patent 5,592,086), which was alleged to be able to detect the magnetic field around a human hair, for example, and diagnose almost any disease. He renamed it the "Vibration-o-Meter," became an operator himself, and started a business dealing in vibrations.

He was President Emeritus of the International Water For Life Foundation, a non-profit organization based in Oklahoma City in the United States. In 1992, he became a Doctor of Alternative Medicine at the Open International University for Alternative Medicine in India, a fraudulent college that sold illegitimate degrees and was later shut down.

== Ideas ==
Emoto claimed that water was a "blueprint for our reality" and that emotional "energies" and "vibrations" could change its physical structure. His water crystal experiments consisted of exposing water in glasses to various words, pictures, or music, then freezing it and examining the ice crystals' aesthetic properties with microscopic photography. He claimed that water exposed to positive speech and thoughts created visually "pleasing" ice crystals, and that negative intentions yielded "ugly" ice formations.

Emoto held that different water sources produced different ice structures. For example, he held that water from a mountain stream, when frozen, showed structures of beautifully shaped geometric designs; but that water from polluted sources created distorted, randomly formed ice structures. He held that these changes could be eliminated by exposing water to ultraviolet light or certain electromagnetic waves.

== Reception ==
In 2008, Emoto published his findings in the Journal of Scientific Exploration, a journal of the Society for Scientific Exploration that has been criticized for catering to fringe science. He co-conducted and co-authored the work with Takashige Kizu of Emoto's own International Health Medical (IHM) General Institute, and Dean Radin and Nancy Lund of the Institute of Noetic Sciences, which is on Stephen Barrett's Quackwatch list of questionable organizations.

Commentators have criticized Emoto for insufficient experimental controls and for not sharing enough details of his experiments with the scientific community. He has also been criticized for designing his experiments in ways that permit manipulation or human error. Biochemist and Director of Microscopy at University College Cork William Reville wrote, "It is very unlikely that there is any reality behind Emoto's claims." Reville noted the lack of scientific publication and pointed out that anyone who could demonstrate such phenomena would become immediately famous and probably wealthy.

Writing about Emoto's ideas in the Skeptical Inquirer, physician Harriet A. Hall concluded that it was "hard to see how anyone could mistake it for science". In 2003, James Randi published an invitation on his website, offering Emoto to take the One Million Dollar Paranormal Challenge, in which Emoto could have received US$1,000,000 if he had been able to reproduce the experiment under test conditions agreed to by both parties. Randi did not receive a response.

Emoto's book The Hidden Messages in Water was a New York Times best seller. Writing in The New York Times Book Review, literary critic Dwight Garner described it as "spectacularly eccentric", and said its success was "one of those 'head-scratchers' that makes me question the sanity of the reading public." Publishers Weekly described Emoto's later work, The Shape of Love, as "mostly incoherent and unsatisfying".

Emoto's ideas appeared in the movies Kamen Rider: The First and What the Bleep Do We Know!?

== Publications ==
=== Books ===
- 水からの伝言: 世界初!! 水の結晶写真集 (Mizu kara no dengon: sekaihatsu!! mizu no kesshō shashinshū) [Messages from Water: The World's First !! Water Crystal Photobook] (in Japanese). Vol. 1. Tokyo: Hado. 1999. ISBN 9784939098000.
  - English edition: The Message from Water: The Message from Water is Telling Us to Take a Look at Ourselves. Vol. 1. Hado. 2000. ISBN 9784939098000.
- 水からの伝言： 世界初！！水の氷結結晶写真集今日も水にありがとう (Mizu kara no dengon: sekaihatsu!! mizu no kesshō shashinshū) [The Messages from Water] (in Japanese). Vol. 2. Tokyo: Hado. 2001. ISBN 9784939098048.
  - English edition: The Message from Water. Vol. 2. Hado. 2001. ISBN 9784939098048.
- 水が伝える愛のかたち (Mizu ga tsutaeru ai no katachi) [The form of love that water conveys] (in Japanese). Tokyo: Tokuma Shoten. 2003. ISBN 9784198617509.
  - English edition: The Shape of Love: Discovering Who We Are, Where We Came From, and Where We are Going. New York: Doubleday. 2007. ISBN 9780385518376.
- Love Thyself: The Message from Water III. Carlsbad, CA: Hay House. 2004. ISBN 9781401908997.
- 水可以改變我生命 : "愛和感謝"的心情可以創造積極的能量 (Shui ke yi gai bian wo sheng ming : "Ai he gan xie" de xin qing ke yi chuan zao ji ji de neng liang) [Water can change my life: the mood of "love and thanks" can create positive energy] (in Chinese). Taibei Xian Xindian Shi. 2006. ISBN 9789576864971.
  - English edition: The Miracle of Water. New York; Hillsboro, OR: Atria: Beyond Words. 2007. ISBN 9781582701622.
- Water Crystal Healing: Music & Images to Restore Your Well Being. New York; Hillsboro, OR: Atria: Beyond Words. 2006. ISBN 9781582701561.
- The True Power of Water (Book): Healing and Discovering Ourselves; Beyond Words Pub, 2005. ISBN 9781582701288.
- The Hidden Messages in Water; Beyond Words Pub, 2004. ISBN 9781582701141

== See also ==
- Water memory
- Polywater
- Water (2006 film)
- Pseudoscience
- Quantum mysticism
