= Denis Rousseau =

American scientist

Denis L. Rousseau
- Born: New Hampshire, U.S.
- Education: Princeton, Bowdoin
- Known for: Biophysics using Resonance Raman spectroscopy of hemoproteins
- Scientific career
- Fields: Biophysics
- Workplaces: Albert Einstein College of Medicine of Yeshiva University

Denis L. Rousseau (signing papers as D. L. Rousseau) is an American scientist. He is currently professor and university chairman of the department of physiology and biophysics at Albert Einstein College of Medicine.

== Biography ==
Rousseau is professor and university chairman of physiology and biophysics at the Albert Einstein College of Medicine, of Yeshiva University, a position he has held since 1996. He received his B.A. from Bowdoin College and received his Ph.D. in physical chemistry from Princeton University. After holding a position as research associate in the physics department at the University of Southern California, studying with Sergio Porto, he joined AT&T Bell Laboratories in 1969.

== Research ==
In the 1970s, he used infrared spectroscopy to demonstrate that what was thought to be a newly discovered form of water, polywater, was structurally similar to human sweat and not, as he had initially speculated, "the long-awaited fountain of youth" with "immortal properties." This result suggested that the novel properties of polywater were due to contamination from biological impurities. No doubt disappointed that polywater was not the elixir of life he had hoped, he later described polywater as an example of pathological science, an incorrect usage of that term. He is also a pioneer in using resonance Raman spectroscopy to study heme proteins, notably hemoglobin, cytochrome c oxidase, nitric oxide synthase, and the folding of cytochrome c.

== Significant publications ==
- Rousseau, Denis L. (January–February 1992). "Case Studies in Pathological Science". American Scientist. 80 (1): 54–63. Bibcode:1992AmSci..80...54R.
