= Bergen Davis =

American physicist who studied in X-rays and alpha particles

Bergen Davis (March 31, 1869 – June 30, 1958) was an American physicist and a professor at Columbia University.

Davis was born March 31, 1869, near Whitehouse, New Jersey, son of John Davis, a farmer, and Katherine Dilts Davis. He graduated from Rutgers University in 1896 and was awarded a master's degree by Columbia University in 1900 and a Ph.D. in 1901, after which he studied in Europe for two years on a John Tyndall Fellowship under J. J. Thomson and others.

In 1903 Davis took up work at Columbia as a tutor in physics, becoming an instructor in 1907, an adjunct professor in 1909, an associate professor in 1913, and a full professor in 1919, a post he held until his retirement (and appointment as professor emeritus) in 1939, at the age of seventy.

Davis's postgraduate work at the Cavendish Laboratory at Cambridge had prepared him to engage with the new physics which followed the work of scientists such as Albert Einstein, Max Planck, and Niels Bohr, concepts which he helped to introduce into the Columbia curriculum. Among his many important works was a study of ionization and radiation potentials and the theory behind corona discharges. Much of his later work was in studying X-rays, and he helped improve the double X-ray spectrometer.

Davis served for many years as a consultant on X-rays to the staff of the Crocker Institute of Cancer Research at Columbia. He was a member of the Physics Division of the United States National Research Council from 1923 to 1926, and was a member or fellow of various other scientific bodies. He served as vice president of the Physics Section of the American Association for the Advancement of Science, was elected to the American National Academy of Sciences in 1929, and was awarded honorary doctorates from Columbia in 1929 and Rutgers in 1930.

Davis was the person most responsible for reporting the Davis-Barnes Effect, a supposed new behavior of alpha particles interacting with electrons in a magnetic field, and read a paper on the subject to the National Academy of Sciences in 1929, but the effect was shown to be completely the result of observer error, specifically a threshold perception effect. Irving Langmuir gave the Davis-Barnes Effect as an example of "pathological science" in his 1953 talk coining that phrase.

Davis married Marie Clark in 1927. He died on June 30, 1958.
