= Lucifer yellow =

Names
- Preferred IUPAC name Dilithium 6-amino-2-(hydrazinecarbonyl)-1,3-dioxo-2,3-dihydro-1H-benzo[de]isoquinoline-5,8-disulfonate

Identifiers
CAS Number	77944-88-8
3D model (JSmol)	Interactive image
ChEBI	CHEBI:52104
ChEMBL	ChEMBL1650069
ChemSpider	20137740
PubChem CID	20835957
UNII	9654F8OVKE
CompTox Dashboard (EPA)	DTXSID70999134
- InChI: InChI=1S/C13H10N4O9S2.2Li/c14-10-5-1-4(27(21,22)23)2-6-9(5)7(3-8(10)28(24,25)26)12(19)17(11(6)18)13(20)16-15;;/h1-3H,14-15H2,(H,16,20)(H,21,22,23)(H,24,25,26);;/q;2*+1/p-2 Key: DLBFLQKQABVKGT-UHFFFAOYSA-L
- SMILES: c1c(cc2c3c1c(c(cc3c(=O)n(c2=O)C(=O)NN)S(=O)(=O)[O-])N)S(=O)(=O)[O-].[Li+].[Li+]

Properties
Chemical formula	C_{13}H_{10}Li_{2}N_{4}O_{9}S_{2}
Molar mass	444.24 g·mol^{−1}
- Except where otherwise noted, data are given for materials in their standard state (at 25 °C [77 °F], 100 kPa). verify (what is ?) Infobox references

Lucifer yellow is a fluorescent dye used in cell biology. The key property of Lucifer yellow is that it can be readily visualized in both living and fixed cells using a fluorescence microscope. Lucifer yellow was invented by Walter W. Stewart at the National Institutes of Health and patented in 1978.

== Preparations ==
For common usage it is compounded with carbohydrazide (CH) and prepared as a lithium salt. The CH group allows it to be covalently linked to surrounding biomolecules during aldehyde fixation.

Other cations such as ammonium or potassium can be used when lithium is undesirable, but the resulting salts are less soluble in water.

Lucifer yellow can also be compounded as a vinyl sulfone, with ethylenediamine, or with cadaverine.
