= Semyon Korsakov =

Russian inventor (1787–1853)

Semyon Nikolayevich Korsakov
- Семён Николаевич Корсаков
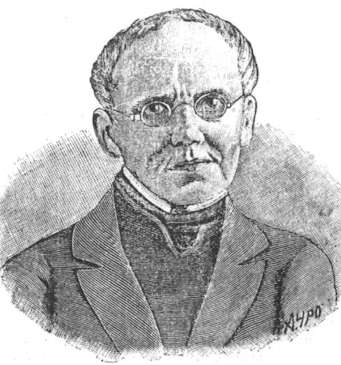
- Born: 25 January [O.S. 14 January] 1787; Kherson, Russian Empire
- Died: 13 December [O.S. 1 December], 1853; Village of Tarusovo (part of the Moscow Province)
- Occupations: Homeopath, inventor

Semyon Nikolayevich Korsakov (Russian: Семён Николаевич Корсаков; 25 January [O.S. 14 January] 1787 – 13 December [O.S. 1 December] 1853) was a Russian government official, noted both as a homeopath and an inventor who was involved with an early version of information technology.

== Biography ==
The family had migrated from Lithuania in the 14th century. Semyon Korsakov was born in 1787 in Kherson, Russian Empire (now in Ukraine). His father, Nikolai Ivanovitch Korsakov (ru), was a military engineer. Semyon Korsakov was nephew of Nikolay Mordvinov, admiral.

He was married to Sofia Mordvinova, and they had four daughters and six sons. One of whom, Mikhail Semyonovich Korsakov (ru; 1826–1871), became famous in his own right as governor-general of Eastern Siberia (ru) and was the namesake of the town of Korsakov in Sakhalin Oblast and several Russian geological features.

From 1812 to 1814, Semyon Korsakov took part in the Napoleonic Wars with the Russian Army. He later was to serve as an official in the statistics department of the Ministry of Internal Affairs in St. Petersburg. He was a recipient of the Order of St. Anna and the Order of St. Vladimir.

Korsakov died in 1853 in the village of Tarusovo (ru), then part of the Moscow Province.

== Homeopathy ==
Though Korsakov was not formally trained as a doctor, he was interested in medicine, possibly because of the difficulty in getting medical care in the rural area where he lived. According to his journals, he treated several thousand patients, at first using conventional medicine, but in 1829 switching to homeopathy at the urging of his relatives.

Korsakov is noted in homeopathic circles as the originator of the Korsakovian method of dilution, which differed from the Hahnemannian dilutions used by (and named for) homeopathy's founder in that it used a single container for a series of dilutions rather than a new container for each. Korsakov also used dilutions higher than those previously used (30C and higher). Dilutions made using his method are commonly designated with the letter "K", e.g. "15K".

== Inventions ==
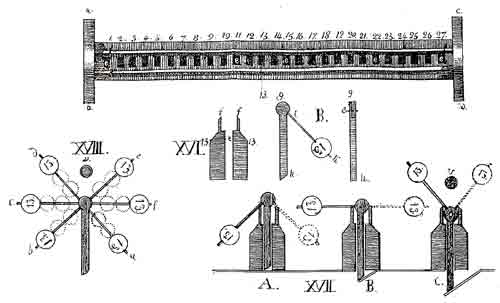
The ideoscope (from a drawing by Korsakov)

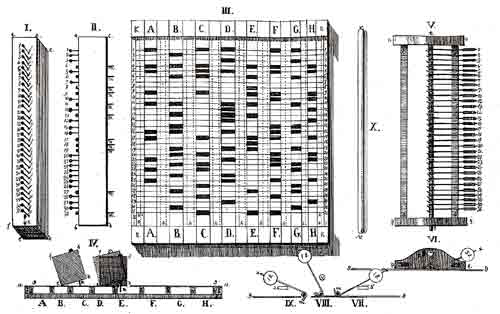
The linear homeoscope without movable parts (from a drawing by Korsakov)

While working in the statistics department of the Police Ministry, Korsakov became intrigued with the possibility of using machinery to "enhance natural intelligence". To this end, he devised several devices which he called "machines for the comparison of ideas". These included the "linear homeoscope with movable parts", the "linear homeoscope without movable parts", the "flat homeoscope", the "ideoscope", and the "simple comparator". The purpose of the devices was primarily to facilitate the search for information, stored in the form of punched cards or similar media (for example, wooden boards with perforations). Korsakov announced his new method in September 1832, and rather than seeking patents, offered the machines for public use.

The punch card had been introduced in 1805, but until that time had been used solely in the textile industry to control looms. Korsakov was reputedly the first to use the cards for information storage.

Korsakov presented his ideas to the Imperial Academy of Sciences in Saint Petersburg, but their experts rejected his application, failing to see the potential of mechanizing searches through large stores of information. His machines were largely forgotten until after the Second World War, when a revival of historical interest resulted in the publication (in 1961) of several documents from the academy's archives relating to Korsakov's machines and the uncovering of a book about them written by Korsakov himself.

Illustration of the function of the linear homeoscope without movable parts

Table of data

Search criteria

Search for matching data
