= Sibte Hasan Zaidi =

Indian pathologist and toxicologist (1918–2008)

- Born: April 1918; Barabanki, British Raj
- Died: 5 April 2008 (aged 89–90); Riverdale, New York, United States

Sibte Hasan Zaidi (April 1918 – 5 April 2008) was an Indian pathologist and toxicologist recognized for his contributions to experimental toxicology. He trained in pathology at Hammersmith Hospital in London, where he also conducted research in toxicology.

Upon completing his training, Zaidi returned to India to do research in experimental toxicology. His work focused on the biological effects of industrial toxins, and he participated in national and international initiatives addressing environmental and occupational health hazards. Zaidi also served on multiple committees, including those of the World Health Organization, where he provided expert advice on toxicology and public health.

== Early life and education ==
Sibte Hasan Zaidi was born in Barabanki, Uttar Pradesh, India, and spent his early years in the village town of Jarwal under the care of his maternal uncle after the death of his mother, Zakia Begum. He later moved to live with his father, Syed Hasan Zaidi, a barrister, and attended Barabanki High School. In 1931, after his father died, Zaidi lived with his uncle, Sardar Husain.

Zaidi pursued higher education at Christian College and Lucknow University before enrolling at King George’s Medical College (now King George's Medical University) in 1940. In 1945, he completed his medical degree. In 1948, he married Qamar Ara Shanshah Husain, a clinical psychologist and the granddaughter of the Rajah of Bhatwamau.

After completing his clinical training and briefly serving as an academic in pathology at King George’s Medical College, Zaidi moved to London. There, he worked with Professor Earl J. King at the Hammersmith Hospital (now associated with Imperial College London). In 1954, he obtained a PhD. In 1952, a Diploma in Clinical Pathology. Both are from the University of London.

The 21st Professor Sibte Hasan Zaidi Oration was delivered by professor Arun Tiwari, former missile scientist and author at the premier toxicology institute of the country, CSIR – Indian Institute of Toxicology Research.

== Research ==
Around 1950, Zaidi's mentor Earl J. King developed an interest in the health of coal miners in the Sheffield. Zaidi assisted by providing a description of the pathology and pathophysiology of coal miners' lungs. Zaidi and co-workers "produced the nearest approach to massive fibrosis by injecting into sensitized animals dust plus tubercle bacilli."

In 1955, Zaidi traveled back to India to be named Head of the Division of Experimental Medicine and Deputy Director at the Central Drug Research Institute (CDRI) in Lucknow, India, where his research focused on mechanisms that underlie peptic ulcer, atherosclerosis, vasospasm, and eosinophilia. Through pharmacologic and animal studies, Zaidi and his colleagues demonstrated the requirement of a mucus barrier in the prevention of peptic ulcer disease. He received the Sir Shanti Swaroop Bhatnagar Award in 1963. He also examined the mechanisms of hypercoagulability and thrombosis and developed rodent models of atherosclerotic heart disease and myocardial infarction.

Between 1964 and 1965, Zaidi served as the third Director of the newly founded Indian Institute of Biochemistry and Experimental Medicine in Calcutta (renamed Indian Institute of Chemical Biology), where he established the institute's research infrastructure. Additionally, he initiated dissections and clarifications of the effect of exposure to industrial toxins on pulmonary fibrosis.

== Industrial Toxicology Research Center (ITRC) ==
Zaidi is the Founding Director of the Industrial Toxicology Research Center (ITRC) in Lucknow (now renamed Indian Institute of Toxicology Research). The then-President of India, V. V. Giri, and later President Fakhruddin Ali Ahmed, supported it. During his tenure at ITRC, Zaidi grew the Center and continued to work. His research was funded continuously by the Public Health Service of the United States through their PL 480 program.

== Publications ==
Zaidi's monograph "Experimental Pneumoconiosis" was published by Johns Hopkins Press in 1969. His editorial "Bhopal and After", published in the American Journal of Industrial Medicine and later quoted in several articles, highlighted gaps in 1980s policy that could lead to spillage of chemicals.

== Recognition ==
In 1977, Zaidi was awarded the William P. Yant Award for lifetime achievements and contributions to industrial toxicology by the American Industrial Hygiene Association. He also served on their Editorial Board from 1977 to 1993. In 1978, the Venezuelan Society gave him the highest honor for his contributions to industrial medicine. He was awarded the Sir Ardeshirlal Dalal Gold Medal for his contributions to occupational health (1975), and the Padma Shri (1977) by the Government of India.

Zaidi was inducted as a Founding Member of the Royal College of Pathologists and thereafter was conferred a Fellowship. He was inducted as a Fellow of the National Academy of Medical Sciences of India (1976), the National Academy of Sciences, India (1972), and the Indian National Science Academy (1974). These honors are listed in his official obituary, published by the Indian Institute of Toxicology Research. SH Zaidi Memorial Oration endowed annual lectureship was established in 1998. The 12th oration was given by his son, Mone Zaidi.

== Policy and positions ==
In 1975, Zaidi hosted "The International Symposium on Industrial Toxicology" in Lucknow. He was thereafter inducted as president of the Asian Society of Environmental Industrial Toxicology (1975). He was also Professor at the Azad University in Kanpur and Visiting Professor to the University of Düsseldorf on two occasions.

Zaidi served on the United Nations Development Programme (UNDP), the World Health Organization (WHO), and the International Labour Organization (ILO). His work on the World Health Organization's Expert Committees became the basis of two key technical reports. He was also an Advisor to the Occupational Health Committee of the WHO, Member of the Scientific Advisory Committee of the UN International Registry on Potentially Toxic Chemicals in Geneva (1977–1979), Senior Consultant to the United Nations Environment Programme (1982), and WHO Consultant in Bangladesh and Burma. He founded two institutes for outreach research in Rangoon (1982–1984) and Sri Lanka (1979) under the backing of the United Nations.

In India, he served as Honorary Advisor to the Ministry of Railways, a position that he retained between 1978 and 1989. He chaired the Environmental Research Committee of the Ministry of Environment of the Government of India between 1990 and 1993.

== Later life ==
During the late 1990s and thereafter, Zaidi lived intermittently in India, the United Kingdom, and the United States with his son, Mone Zaidi, who is an attending physician at Mount Sinai Hospital, Mount Sinai Professor of Clinical Medicine and Professor of Pharmacological Sciences, and Director of the Center of Translational Medicine and Pharmacology at Icahn School of Medicine at Mount Sinai in New York. Zaidi died at his home in Riverdale, New York, on 5 April 2008.
