= Jacques Benveniste =

French immunologist and physician (1935–2004)

Jacques Benveniste (French: [ʒɑk bɛ̃venist]; 12 March 1935 – 3 October 2004) was a French immunologist born in Paris. In 1979, he published a paper on the structure of platelet-activating factor and its relationship with histamine. He was head of allergy and inflammation immunology at the French biomedical research agency INSERM.

Jacques Benveniste was promoted to "Chevalier de l’Ordre National du Mérite", 1984, and honoured with the "Médaille d’Argent du CNRS", 1985. He published more than 300 peer-reviewed articles in Immunology, of which 26 in the J. Immunol. from 1971 to 1994.

In 1988, after more than 6 years applying his classical research method to high dilutions and thousands of experiments, Benveniste and colleagues published a paper in Nature describing the action of very high dilutions of anti-IgE antibody on the degranulation of human basophils, findings that seemed to support the concept of homeopathy. After the article was published, a follow-up investigation was set up by a team including John Maddox, James Randi and Walter Stewart. With the cooperation of Benveniste's own team, the group failed to replicate the original results, and subsequent investigations did not support Benveniste's findings. Benveniste refused to retract, damaging his reputation and forcing him to fund research himself, as external sources of funding were withdrawn. In 1997, he founded the company DigiBio to "develop and commercialise applications of Digital Biology." Benveniste died in 2004 in Paris following heart surgery.

== Early career ==
He qualified as a physician in 1960 and practised medicine in Paris before taking a research job in cancer at the Institute Gustave Roussy in Paris and then in 1969 the Scripps Clinic in California. He returned to France in 1972, becoming the head of allergy and inflammation immunology at the French biomedical research agency INSERM (Institut de la Santé et de la Recherche Médicale). He became a senior research director in 1984, but was placed under probation following a routine evaluation of his lab in 1989. Although INSERM found that his laboratory activities overall were exemplary, it expressed severe discomfort with his high dilution studies, and criticized him for "an insufficiently critical analysis of the results he reported, the cavalier character of the interpretations he made of them, and the abusive use of his scientific authority vis-à-vis his informing of the public". In 2002 he was made emeritus research director at INSERM.

=== Platelet-activating factor ===
Platelet-activating factor was discovered by Benveniste in the early 1970s. PAF was the first phospholipid known to have messenger functions. Benveniste made significant contributions in the role and characteristics of PAF and its importance in inflammatory response and mediation. Using lab rats and mice, he found that ionophore A23187 (a mobile ion carrier that allows the passage of Mn^{2+}, Ca^{2+} and Mg^{2+} and has antibiotic properties against bacteria and fungi) caused the release of PAF. These developments led to the finding that macrophages produce PAF and that macrophages play an important function in aggregation of platelets and liberation of their inflammatory and vasoactive substances.

== Benveniste affair ==
A member of Benveniste's staff put a homoeopathically diluted remedy through his allergy test, returning a positive result. Benveniste began experimenting and in 1988 published a paper in the scientific journal Nature describing the action of very high dilutions of anti-IgE antibody on the degranulation of human basophils. Only molecules of water, and no molecules of the original antibody, remained in these high dilutions. Benveniste concluded that the configuration of molecules in water was biologically active; a journalist coined the term water memory for this hypothesis. Nature printed an editorial titled "When to believe the unbelievable" in the same issue of the journal and attached the following disclaimer to the article: "Editorial reservation: Readers of this article may share the incredulity of the many referees. ... There is no physical basis for such an activity. ... Nature has therefore arranged for independent investigators to observe repetitions of the experiments." The last time such a disclaimer had been added was in 1974 to an article on Uri Geller.

A week after publication of the article, Nature sent a team of three investigators to Benveniste's lab to attempt to replicate his results under controlled conditions. The team consisted of Nature editor and physicist Sir John Maddox, American scientific fraud investigator and chemist Walter W. Stewart, and skeptic and former magician James Randi. The team oversaw seven attempts to replicate Benveniste's study. Three of the first four attempts turned out somewhat favorable to Benveniste; however the team was not satisfied with the rigor of the methodology. Benveniste invited them to design a double blind procedure. Before fully revealing the results, the team asked if there were any complaints about the procedure, but none were brought up. These stricter attempts turned out negative for Benveniste. In response to Benveniste's refusal to withdraw his claims, the team published in the July 1988 edition of Nature. Since multiple readings of the samples were closer than statistically expected for the non-double blind tests, the team argued that unintentional bias was the culprit. Various other research groups have also failed to replicate Benveniste's results.

On 3 September 1988, Channel 4 broadcast an After Dark television discussion featuring among others Benveniste, James Randi, Walter Stewart and Jonathan Miller. In 1991, the French Academy of Sciences published his latest results, obtained under the supervision of Alfred Spira, a statistician, in its weekly Proceedings. Benveniste's article was labelled a "right of reply"— being downgraded from the status of an article. The study is a replication of early high dilution experiments. Benveniste gained the public support of Brian Josephson, a Nobel laureate physicist with a reputation for openness to paranormal claims. Experiments continued along the same basic lines, culminating with a 1997 paper claiming the effect could be transmitted over phone lines. This was followed by two additional papers in 1999 and another, in the controversial non-peer reviewed Medical Hypotheses, on remote-transmission in 2000 by which time it was claimed that it could also be sent over the Internet.

Josephson challenged the American Physical Society (APS) to oversee a replication by Benveniste. This challenge was to be "a randomized double-blind test", of his claimed ability to transfer the characteristics of homeopathically altered solutions over the Internet. The APS accepted the challenge and offered to cover the costs of the test. When he heard of this, Randi offered to throw in the long-standing $1 million prize for any positive demonstration of the paranormal, to which Benveniste replied: "Fine to us." in his DigiBio NewsLetter. Randi later noted that Benveniste and Josephson did not follow up on their challenge, mocking their silence on the topic as if they were missing persons.

Focus on the study was reignited in 2004 when an article was published in Inflammation Research, with researchers concluding that an effect did exist. Despite its critics, Nobel Laureate Luc Montagnier, who was credited with identifying the AIDS virus, subsequently took up Benveniste's work on water memory, and he and a number of other scientists claimed to have successfully replicated Benveniste's experiments.

== Digital Biology ==
In the nineties, Benveniste also asserted that water memory could be digitized, transmitted, and reinserted into another sample of water, which would then contain the same active qualities as the first sample. In 1997, he founded the company DigiBio to "develop and commercialise applications of Digital Biology." With the support of Josephson, the experiments continued, culminating in a 1997 paper claiming a water memory effect could be transmitted over phone lines. Two additional papers were published, one in 1999 and another in 2000.

Intrigued by Benveniste's claims that biological interactions could be digitized, the US Defence Advanced Research Projects Agency (DARPA) asked Wayne Jonas, homeopath and then director of the US National Center for Complementary and Alternative Medicine, to organize an attempt at independently replicating the claimed results. An independent test of the 2000 remote-transmission experiment was carried out in the US by a team funded by the US Department of Defense. Using the same experimental devices and setup as the Benveniste team, they failed to find any effect when running the experiment. One of Benveniste's machines was used in the design and pilot project phase in 2001, Benveniste and other members of his DigiBio lab participated as consultants. Interviews at the time indicated study participants were satisfied with the way the study was being conducted. In the end, the authors reported in the FASEB Journal in 2006 that "Our team found no replicable effects from digital signals".

== Awards ==
Benveniste has been awarded two Ig Nobel Prizes in Chemistry. They are a parody of the Nobel Prizes. The first in 1991 describes Jacques Benveniste as a "prolific proselytizer and dedicated correspondent of Nature, for his persistent belief that water, H_{2}O, is an intelligent liquid, and for demonstrating to his satisfaction that water is able to remember events long after all trace of those events has vanished." The second in 1998 cites "his homeopathic discovery that not only does water have memory, but that the information can be transmitted over telephone lines and the Internet." He was the first person, and is now one of nine people, to have won the award twice.

== See also ==
- List of Ig Nobel Prize winners

== Bibliography ==
- Benveniste, Jacques (2005) Ma vérité sur la 'mémoire de l'eau', Albin Michel. ISBN 2-226-15877-4
- Benveniste, Jacques, and Peter Jurgens. On the Role of Stage Magicians in Biological Research The Anomalist 1998
- Benveniste, Jacques. Electromagnetically Activated Water and the Puzzle of the Biological Signal INSERM Digital Biology Laboratory (March 10., 1999)
- Benveniste, Jacques. "Put a match to pyre review" Nature 396 Dec 10 1998
- Benveniste, Jacques. "Further Biological Effects Induced by Ultra High Dilutions: Inhibition by a Magnetic Field", In P.C. Endler, ed.,Ultra High Dilution: Physiology and Physics. Dordrecht: Kluwe academic, 1994
- Benveniste, Jacques, "Transfer of Biological Activity by Electromagnetic Fields." Frontier Perspectives 3(2) 1993:113-15.
- Benveniste, Jacques (1993). "Molecular signaling at high dilution or by means of electronic circuitry". Journal of Immunology. 150: 146A.
- Benveniste, Jacques (1994). "Transfer of the molecular signal by electronic amplification". FASEB Journal. 8: A398.
- Benveniste, Jacques (1995). "Electronic transmission of the cholinergic signal". FASEB Journal. 9: A683.
- Benveniste, Jacques (1995). "Direct transmission to cells of a molecular signal via an electronic device". FASEB Journal. 9: A227.
- Benveniste, J.; Ducot, B.; Spira, A. (1994). "Memory of water revisited". Nature. 370 (6488): 322. Bibcode:1994Natur.370..322B. doi:10.1038/370322a0. PMID 8047128.
- Benveniste, J., Davenas, E. & A. Spira (1991) Comptes Rendus de l'Académie des Sciences, January.
