= Polywater =

Hypothetical polymerized form of water

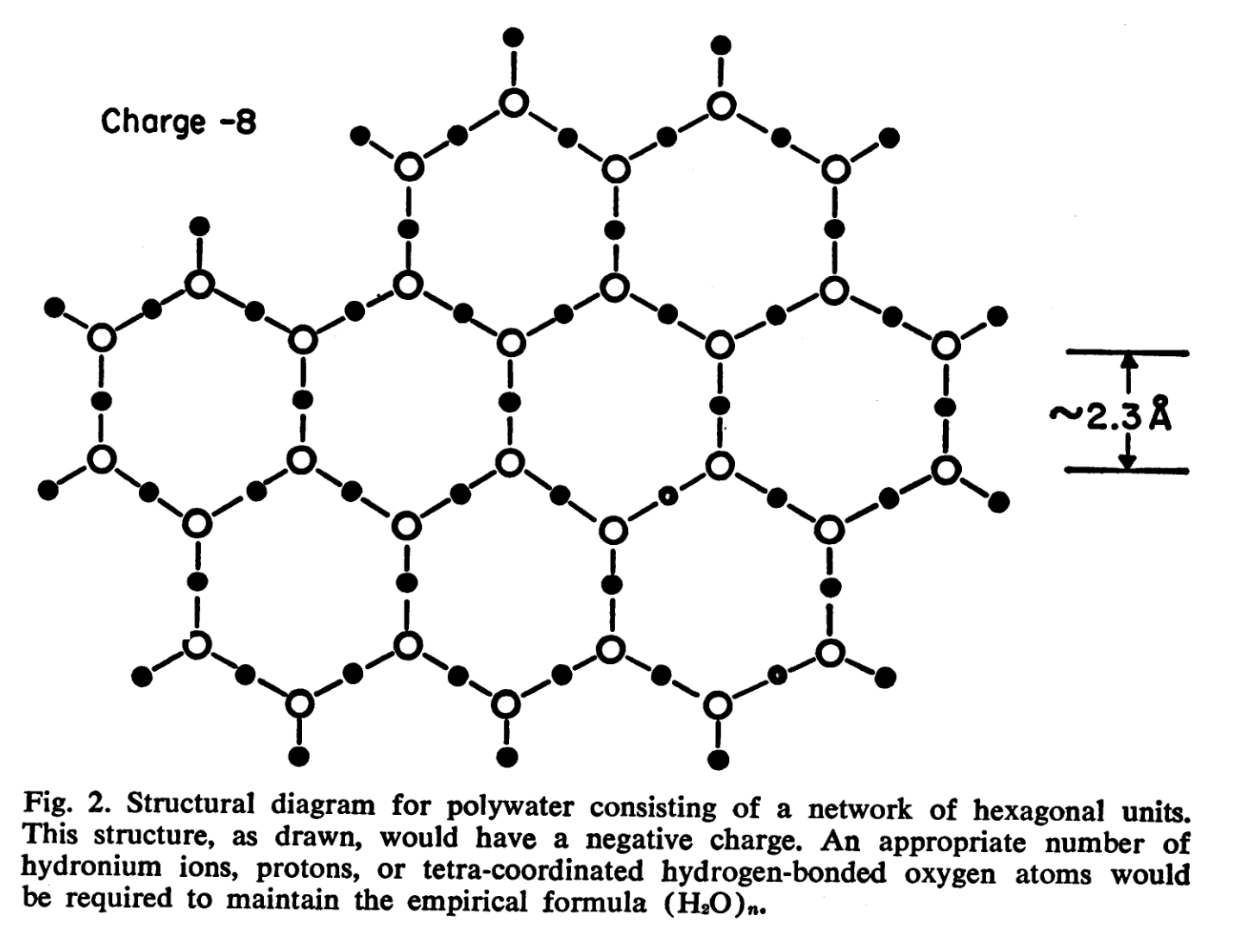
Proposed hexagonal structure for polywater in 1969, one year before polywater was disproven entirely

Polywater was a hypothesized polymerized form of water that was the subject of much scientific controversy during the late 1960s, first described by Soviet scientist Nikolai Fedyakin. By 1969 the popular press had taken notice of Western attempts to recreate the substance and sparked fears of a "polywater gap" between the United States and Soviet Union. Increased press attention also brought with it increased scientific attention, and as early as 1970 doubts about its authenticity were being circulated. By 1973 it was found to be illusory, being just water with any number of common compounds contaminating it. Today, polywater is best known as an example of pathological science.

== Background ==
In 1961, the Soviet physicist Nikolai Fedyakin, working at the Technological Institute of Kostroma, Russia, performed measurements on the properties of water which had been condensed in, or repeatedly forced through, narrow quartz capillary tubes. Some of these experiments resulted in what was seemingly a new form of water with a higher boiling point, lower freezing point, and much higher viscosity than ordinary water – about that of a syrup.

Boris Derjaguin, director of the laboratory for surface physics at the Institute for Physical Chemistry in Moscow, heard about Fedyakin's experiments. He improved on the method to produce the new water, and though he still produced very small quantities of this mysterious material, he did so substantially faster than Fedyakin did. Investigations of the material properties showed a substantially lower freezing point of −40 °C or less, a boiling point of 150 °C or greater, a density of approx. 1.1 to 1.2 g/cm^{3}, and increased expansion with increasing temperature. The results were published in Soviet science journals, and short summaries were published in Chemical Abstracts in English, but Western scientists took no notice of the work.

In 1966, Derjaguin travelled to England for the "Discussions of the Faraday Society" in Nottingham. There, he presented the work again, and this time English scientists took note of what he referred to as anomalous water. English scientists then started researching the effect as well, and by 1968 it was also under study in the United States.

By 1969, the concept had spread to newspapers and magazines. There was claimed interest at the Pentagon that there was a so-called "polywater gap" with the Soviet Union, a popular media term indicating a possible capability "gap", or discrepancy, between the US and the USSR, popularized by media hype of the "bomber gap" and the "missile gap", during periods when the USSR appeared to be outstripping the US in numbers of these various weapons.

A scientific furore followed. Some experiments carried out were able to reproduce Derjaguin's findings, while others failed. Several theories were advanced to explain the phenomenon. Some proposed it was the cause for increasing resistance on trans-Atlantic phone cables, while others predicted that if polywater were to contact ordinary water, it would convert that water into polywater, echoing the doomsday scenario in Kurt Vonnegut's novel Cat's Cradle. By the 1970s, polywater was well known in the general population.

During this time, several people questioned the authenticity of what had come to be known in the West as polywater. The main concern was contamination of the water, but the papers went to great lengths to note the care taken to avoid this. Denis Rousseau and Sergio Porto of Bell Labs carried out infrared spectrum analysis, which showed polywater to be mostly chlorine and sodium.

Denis Rousseau undertook an experiment with his own sweat after playing a handball game at the lab and found it had identical properties. He then published a paper suggesting polywater was nothing more than water with small amounts of biological impurities.

Another wave of research followed, this time more tightly controlled. Invariably, polywater could no longer be made. Chemical analysis found the samples of polywater to be contaminated with other substances (explaining the changes in melting and boiling points due to colligative properties), and examination of polywater by electron microscopy showed it also contained small particles of various solids – from silica to phospholipids, explaining its greater viscosity.

When the experiments which had initially produced polywater were repeated with thoroughly cleaned glassware, the anomalous properties of the resulting water vanished, and even the scientists who had originally advanced the case for polywater agreed it did not exist. In August 1973, Derjaguin and N. V. Churaev published a letter in the journal Nature in which they wrote: "these [anomalous] properties should be attributed to impurities rather than to the existence of polymeric water molecules".

Denis Rousseau used polywater as a classic example of pathological science and has since written on other examples as well.

It has been suggested that polywater should have been dismissed on theoretical grounds. The laws of thermodynamics predicted that, since polywater had a higher boiling point than ordinary water, it meant it was more stable, and thus all of Earth's water should have turned spontaneously into polywater, instead of just part of it. Richard Feynman remarked that if such a material existed, then an animal would exist that would ingest water and excrete polywater, using the energy released from the process to survive.

== See also ==
- Hexagonal water
- Water memory
- Hard water
- N ray
- ice-nine
