= Homeopathic dilutions =

Process in homeopathy

In homeopathy, homeopathic dilution (known by practitioners as "dynamisation" or "potentisation") is a process in which a substance is diluted with alcohol or distilled water and then vigorously shaken in a process called "succussion". Insoluble solids, such as quartz and oyster shell, are diluted by grinding them with lactose (trituration). The founder of homeopathy, Samuel Hahnemann (1755–1843), asserted that the process of succussion activated the "vital energy" of the diluted substance, and that successive dilutions increased the "potency" of the preparation, although other strands of homeopathy (such as Schuessler's) disagreed.

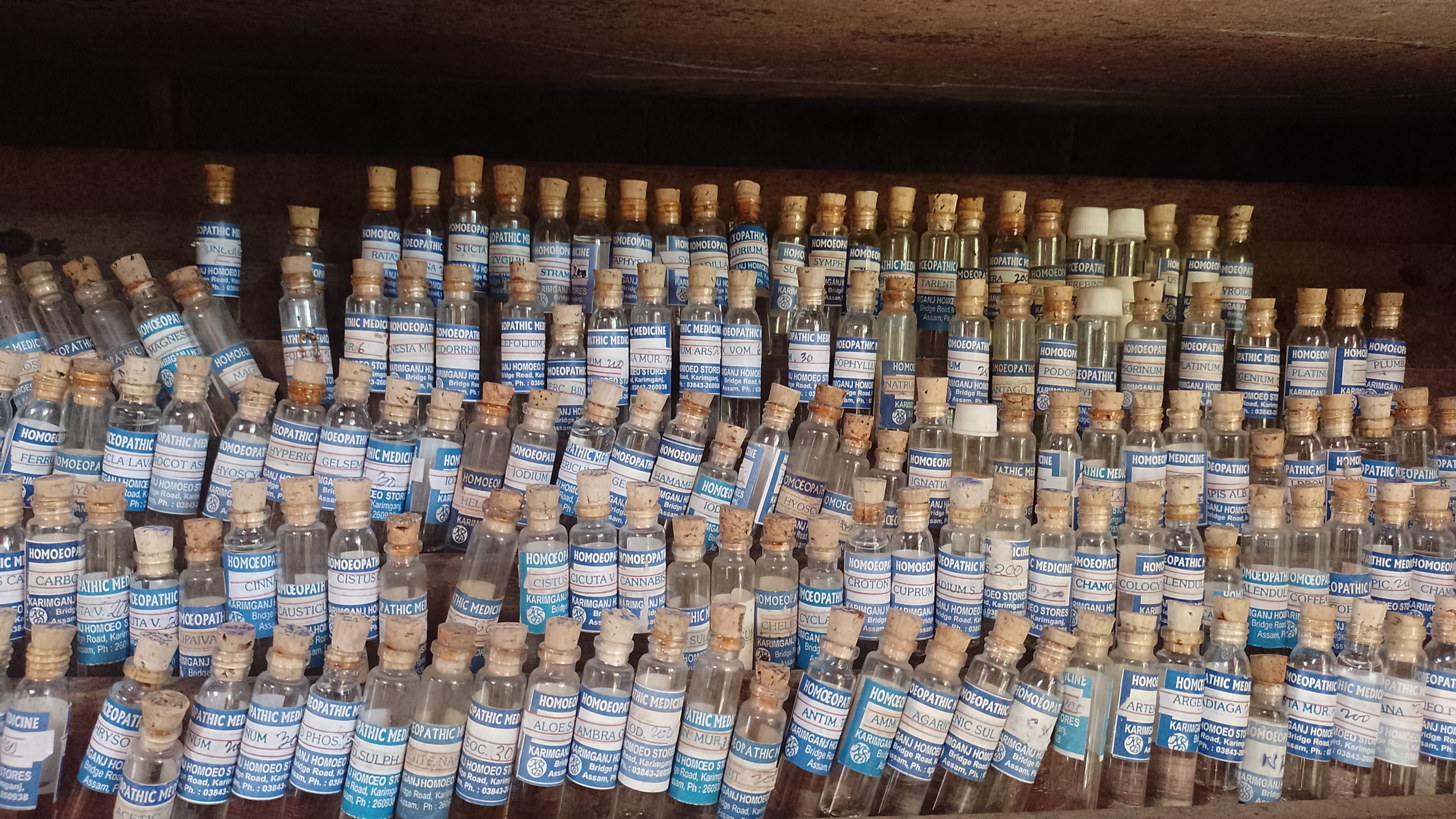
Homeopathic preparations on a shelf

The concept is pseudoscience because, at commonly used dilutions, no molecules of the original material are likely to remain. Therefore high homeopathic dilutions must be distinguished from low dilutions where there can be an overlap with herbal medicine.

== Background ==
The founder of homeopathy, Samuel Hahnemann found that undiluted doses caused reactions, sometimes dangerous ones, so specified that preparations be given at the lowest possible dose. To counter the reduced potency at high dilutions he formed the view that vigorous shaking by striking on an elastic surface – a process termed succussion – was necessary. It has been said that Hahnemann came to this conclusion after deciding preparations subjected to agitation in transit, such as in saddle bags or in a carriage, were more "potent". Hahnemann had a saddle-maker construct a special wooden striking board covered in leather on one side and stuffed with horsehair. The process of dilution and succussion is termed "dynamization" or "potentization" by homeopaths. In industrial manufacture this may be done by machine. There are differences of opinion on the number and force of strikes, and some practitioners dispute the need for succussion at all. There are no laboratory assays and the importance and techniques for succussion cannot be determined with any certainty from the literature.

== Potency scales ==
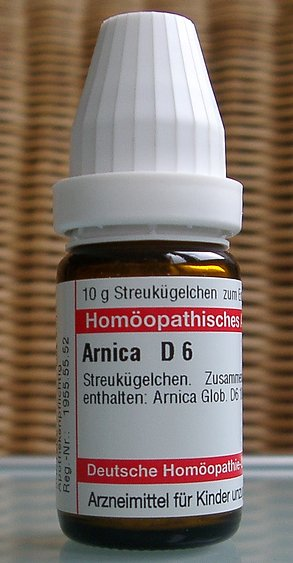
This bottle contains Arnica montana (Leopard's Bane, Fallkraut) D6, i.e. the nominal dilution is one part in a million (10^{6}).

Three main logarithmic dilution scales are in regular use in homeopathy. Hahnemann created the "centesimal" or "C scale", diluting a substance by a factor of 100 at each stage. There is also a decimal dilution scale (notated as "X" or "D") in which the preparation is diluted by a factor of 10 at each stage. The centesimal scale was favoured by Hahnemann for most of his life, although in his last ten years Hahnemann developed a quintamillesimal (Q) scale which diluted the drug 1 part in 50,000.

A 2C dilution requires a substance to be diluted to one part in one hundred, and then some of that diluted solution diluted by a further factor of one hundred. This works out to one part of the original substance in 10,000 parts of the solution. (Note: In standard chemistry, this produces a substance with a concentration of 0.01%, measured by the volume-volume percentage method.) A 6C dilution repeats this process six times, ending up with the original material diluted by a factor of 100^{-6} = 10^{-12}. Higher dilutions follow the same pattern. In homeopathy, a solution that is more dilute is described as having a higher potency, and more dilute substances are considered by homeopaths to be stronger and deeper-acting. The end product is often so diluted that it is indistinguishable from the dilutant (typically ethanol or pure water for liquids, milk sugar for insoluble solids).

Hahnemann advocated 30C dilutions for most purposes (that is, dilution by a factor of 10^{60}). Hahnemann regularly used dilutions up to 300C but opined that "there must be a limit to the matter". In Hahnemann's time it was reasonable to assume that preparations could be diluted indefinitely, as the concept of the atom or molecule as the smallest possible unit of a chemical substance was just beginning to be recognized. It is now known that the greatest dilution that is reasonably likely to contain one molecule of the original substance is 12C, if starting from 1 mole of original substance (see Avogadro constant for justification).

Some homeopaths developed a decimal scale (D or X), diluting the substance to ten times its original volume each stage. The D or X scale dilution is therefore half that of the same value of the C scale; for example, "12X" is the same level of dilution as "6C". Hahnemann never used this scale but it was very popular throughout the 19th century and still is in Europe. This potency scale appears to have been introduced in the 1830s by the American homeopath Constantine Hering. In the last ten years of his life, Hahnemann also developed a quintamillesimal (Q) or LM scale diluting the drug 1 part in 50,000 parts of diluent. A given dilution on the Q scale is roughly 2.35 times its designation on the C scale. For example, a preparation described as "20Q" has about the same concentration as one described with "47C". (Note: If a dilution is designated as q on the Q scale, and c on the C scale: c/q = (log_{10} 50000)/2 = 2.349485.)

Potencies of 1000C and above are usually labelled with Roman numeral M and with the centesimal 'C' indicator implied (since all such high potencies are centesimal dilutions): 1M = 1000C; 10M = 10,000C; CM = 100,000C; LM (which would indicate 50,000C) is typically not used because of confusion with the LM potency scale.

The following table is a synopsis comparing the X and C dilution scales and equating them by equivalent dilution. However, the homeopathic understanding of its principles is not explained by dilution but by "potentisation", hence one can not assume that the different potencies can be equated on the basis of equivalence of dilution factors.

| X Scale | C Scale | Ratio | Note |
|---|---|---|---|
| 1X | ― | 1∶10 | described as low potency |
| 2X | 1C | 1∶100 | called higher potency than 1X by homeopaths |
| 6X | 3C | 1∶10^{6} | |
| 8X | 4C | 1∶10^{8} | |
| 12X | 6C | 1∶10^{12} | |
| 24X | 12C | 1∶10^{24} | Has a 60% probability of containing one molecule of original material if one mole of the original substance was used. |
| 26X | 13C | 1∶10^{26} | If pure water were used as the diluent, no molecules of the original solution remain in the water. |
| 60X | 30C | 1∶10^{60} | Dilution advocated by Hahnemann for most purposes: on average, this would require giving two billion doses per second to six billion people for 4 billion years to deliver a single molecule of the original material to any patient. |
| 400X | 200C | 1∶10^{400} | Dilution of popular homeopathic flu preparation Oscillococcinum |
Note: the "X scale" is also called "D scale". 1X = 1D, 2X = 2D, etc.

== Dilutions ==
Serial dilution of a solution results, after each dilution step, in fewer molecules of the original substance per litre of solution. Eventually, a solution will be diluted beyond any likelihood of finding a single molecule of the original substance in a litre of the total dilution product. The "Korsakovian" method may also be used. In the Korsakovian method the vessel in which the preparations are manufactured is emptied, refilled with solvent, with the volume of fluid adhering to the walls of the vessel deemed sufficient for the new batch. The Korsakovian method is sometimes referred to as K on the label of a homeopathic preparation. Another method is Fluxion, which dilutes the substance by continuously passing water through the vial. Insoluble solids, such as granite, diamond, and platinum, are diluted by grinding them with lactose ("trituration").

=== The molar limit ===
If one begins with a solution of 1 mol/L of a substance, the dilution required to reduce the number of molecules to less than one per litre is 1 part in 10^{24} (24X or 12C) since using the Avogadro constant:

(6.02×10^{23} molecules/L)/(10^{24} L) = 0.6 molecules

Homeopathic dilutions beyond this limit (equivalent to approximately 12C) are unlikely to contain even a single molecule of the original substance and lower dilutions contain no detectable amount. ISO 3696 (Water for analytical laboratory use) specifies a purity of ten parts per billion, or 10×10^{−9} ― this water cannot be kept in glass or plastic containers as they leach impurities into the water, and glassware must be washed with hydrofluoric acid before use. Ten parts per billion is equivalent to a homeopathic dilution of 4C.

=== Analogies ===
Critics and advocates of homeopathy alike commonly attempt to illustrate the dilutions involved in homeopathy with analogies.

An example given states that a 12C solution is equivalent to a "pinch of salt in both the North and South Atlantic Oceans", which is approximately correct. (Note: A 12C solution produced using sodium chloride (also called natrum muriaticum in homeopathy) is the equivalent of dissolving 0.36 mL of table salt, weighing about 0.77 g, into a volume of water the size of the Atlantic Ocean, since the volume of the Atlantic Ocean and its adjacent seas is 3.55×10^{8} km^{3} (3.55×10^{20} L)) One-third of a drop of some original substance diluted into all the water on earth would produce a preparation with a concentration of about 13C. (Note: The volume of all water on earth is about 1.36×10^{9} km^{3})

A popular homeopathic treatment for the flu is a 200C dilution of duck liver, marketed under the name Oscillococcinum. As there are only about 10^{80} atoms in the entire observable universe, a dilution of one molecule in the observable universe would be about 40C. Oscillococcinum would thus require 10^{320} times more atoms to simply have one molecule in the final substance.

Another illustration of dilutions used in common homeopathic preparations involves comparing a homeopathic dilution to dissolving the therapeutic substance in a swimming pool. There are on the order of 10^{32} molecules of water in an Olympic-size swimming pool and if such a pool were filled entirely with a 15C homeopathic preparation, to have a 63% chance of consuming at least one molecule of the original substance, one would need to swallow 1% of the volume of such a pool, or roughly 25 metric tons (28 short tons) of water.

The high dilutions characteristically used are often considered to be the most controversial and implausible aspect of homeopathy.

== Proposed explanations ==
Homeopaths maintain that this water retains some "essential property" of the original material, because the preparation has been shaken after each dilution. Hahnemann believed that the dynamisation or shaking of the solution caused a "spirit-like" healing force to be released from within the substance. Even though the homeopathic preparations are often extremely diluted, homeopaths maintain that a healing force is retained by these homeopathic preparations. Modern advocates of homeopathy have proposed a concept of "water memory", according to which water "remembers" the substances mixed in it, and transmits the effect of those substances when consumed. This concept is inconsistent with the current understanding of matter, and water memory has never been demonstrated to have any detectable effect, biological or otherwise. The claim often given to support "water memory" is that science does not fully understand water. In fact a great deal is known about the structure and properties of liquid water, from both theoretical and experimental studies, because of its importance in biochemistry, its relative molecular simplicity and the quantum mechanical nature of hydrogen bonding which make it a popular substance to study in theoretical chemistry. The actual persistence of structure in water can be measured experimentally and is found to be around 50 femtoseconds, which is 0.00000000000005 seconds. Generally considered to be pseudoscience by the scientific community, one disputed study into the so-called memory of water, conducted by Jacques Benveniste, claims to have demonstrated that water can be energetically imprinted upon. Another such study, published in 2003 by Swiss chemist Louis Rey, claims to have found that homeopathically diluted solutions of sodium chloride and lithium chloride have a very different hydrogen bond structure from normal water, as measured by thermoluminescence.

== Dilution debate ==
Not all homeopaths advocate extremely high dilutions. Many of the early homeopaths were originally doctors and generally used lower dilutions such as "3X" or "6X", rarely going beyond "12X"; these dilution ("trituration") levels were still popular in the late 20th century with advocates of Wilhelm Heinrich Schüßler's 12 biochemic tissue salts, for example. The split between lower and higher dilutions followed ideological lines. Those favoring low dilutions stressed pathology and a strong link to conventional medicine, while those favoring high dilutions emphasised vital force, miasms and a spiritual interpretation of disease. Some products with both low and high dilutions continue to be sold, but like their counterparts, they have not been conclusively demonstrated to have any effect when tested against placebo.
