= Boiron =

French manufacturer of homeopathic products

- Type: Public
- Traded as: Euronext: BOI; CAC Small
- Industry: Alternative medicine
- Founded: 7 June 1932; 94 years ago
- Founders: Jean Boiron; Henri Boiron
- Headquarters: Messimy, France
- Area served: worldwide
- Key people: Valérie Poinsot (CEO)
- Revenue: 604 million € (2018)
- Net income: 57.4 million € (2018)
- Number of employees: 3,723
- Website: www.boiron.fr

Boiron (French pronunciation: [bwaʁɔ̃]) is a manufacturer of homeopathic products, headquartered in France and with an operating presence in 59 countries worldwide. It is the largest manufacturer of homeopathic products in the world. In 2004, it had a workforce of 2,779 and turnover of € 313 million. It is a member of the CAC Small stock index.

In June 2005, the firm acquired Dolisos Laboratories, then the world's second largest manufacturer of homeopathic preparations.

Products of Boiron include mono- (Hahnemanian) and poly-preparations, which Boiron refer to as "proprietary drugs".

Homeopathy is a pseudoscience with no evidence of effectiveness for stated claims or plausible mechanism of medicinal effect, and several class action lawsuits have been filed on behalf of consumers claiming that Boiron's homeopathic products, including Children's Coldcalm and Oscillococcinum, are useless and Boiron's marketing of these products is deceptive.

== Controversies ==
=== Samuele Riva ===
Samuele Riva, an Italian blogger, wrote an article about the implausibility of homeopathy, including images of Boiron's products. The company sent a letter to the Internet provider of the blog, but the result was a backlash in favor of freedom of speech.

=== Lawsuits ===
The non-profit educational organizations Center for Inquiry (CFI) and the associated Committee for Skeptical Inquiry (CSI) have petitioned the U.S. Food and Drug Administration (FDA), criticizing Boiron for misleading labeling and advertising of Oscillococcinum. "One petition complains that Boiron's packaging for Oscillococcinum lists the alleged active ingredient – duck liver and heart – in Latin only. Another petition complains that Boiron's web ad for this product implies that it has received FDA approval." Ronald Lindsay, CFI and CSI president and chief executive officer, contends, "If Boiron is going to sell snake oil, the least they can do is use English on their labels."

A class action against Boiron, filed in 2011 on behalf of "all California residents who purchased Oscillo at any time within the past four years", charged that Boiron "falsely advertises that Oscillo has the ability to cure the flu because it contains an active ingredient it claims is proven to get rid of flu symptoms in 48 hours." The lawsuit also stated that the listed active ingredient in Oscillococcinum (Oscillo) "is actually Muscovy Duck Liver and Heart ... and has no known medicinal quality." A settlement was reached, with Boiron denying any wrongdoing. As part of the settlement, Boiron agreed to make specific changes to its marketing, including adding to their packaging notices like "These 'Uses' have not been evaluated by the Food and Drug Administration" and "C, K, CK, and X are homeopathic dilutions."

While the sector is in crisis following the cessation of reimbursement of homeopathic preparations by social security decided by the Minister of Health Agnès Buzyn, the Boiron group announced that its factory at Montrichard, in Loir-et-Cher had failed to find a buyer. Consequently, the site, which employed approximately 80 people, closed on December 31, 2021.
