= Pathological science =

Area of research which persists despite being widely discredited

Pathological science is an area of research where "people are tricked into false results ... by subjective effects, wishful thinking or threshold interactions." The term was coined by Irving Langmuir, Nobel Prize-winning chemist, during a 1953 colloquium at the Knolls Research Laboratory. Langmuir said a pathological science is an area of research that simply will not "go away"—long after it was given up on as "false" by the majority of scientists in the field. He called pathological science "the science of things that aren't so."

In his 2002 book Undead Science, sociology and anthropology Professor Bart Simon lists it among practices that are falsely perceived or presented to be science, "categories ... such as ... pseudoscience, amateur science, deviant or fraudulent science, bad science, junk science, pathological science, cargo cult science, and voodoo science." Examples of pathological science include the Martian canals, N-rays, and cold fusion. The theories and conclusions behind all of these examples are currently rejected or disregarded by the majority of scientists.

== Definition ==
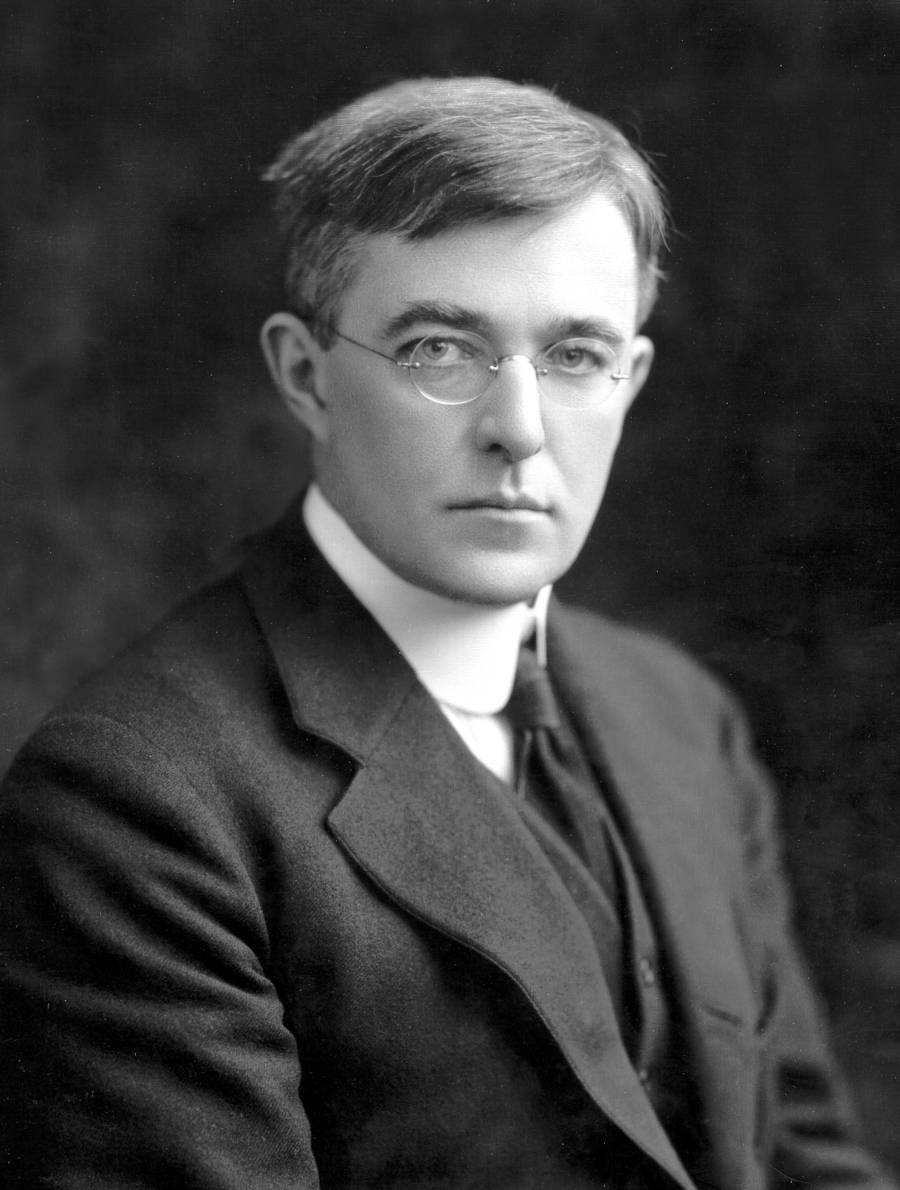
Irving Langmuir coined the term pathological science in a talk in 1953.

Pathological science, as defined by Langmuir, is a psychological process in which a scientist, originally conforming to the scientific method, unconsciously veers from that method, and begins a pathological process of wishful data interpretation. Some characteristics of pathological science are:

- The maximum effect that is observed is produced by a causative agent of barely detectable intensity, and the magnitude of the effect is substantially independent of the intensity of the cause.
- The effect is of a magnitude that remains close to the limit of detectability, or multiple measurements are necessary because of the low statistical significance of the results.
- There are claims of great accuracy.
- Fantastic theories contrary to experience are suggested.
- Criticisms are met by ad hoc excuses.
- The ratio of supporters to critics rises and then falls gradually to oblivion.

Langmuir never intended the term to be rigorously defined; it was simply the title of his talk on some examples of "weird science". As with any attempt to define the scientific endeavor, examples and counterexamples can always be found.

== Langmuir's examples ==
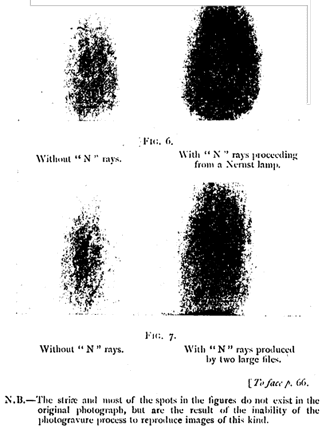
Fig. 6,7 from Prosper-René Blondlot: "Registration by Photography of the Action Produced by N Rays on a Small Electric Spark". Nancy, 1904.

=== N-rays ===
Langmuir's discussion of N-rays has led to their traditional characterization as an instance of pathological science.

In 1903, Prosper-René Blondlot was working on X-rays (as were other physicists of the era) and noticed a new visible radiation that could penetrate aluminium. He devised experiments in which a barely visible object was illuminated by these N-rays, and thus became "more visible". Blondlot claimed that N-rays were causing a small visual reaction, too small to be seen under normal illumination, but just visible when most normal light sources were removed and the target was just barely visible to begin with.

N-rays became the topic of some debate within the science community. After a time, American physicist Robert W. Wood decided to visit Blondlot's lab, which had moved on to the physical characterization of N-rays. An experiment passed the rays from a 2 mm slit through an aluminium prism, from which he was measuring the index of refraction to a precision that required measurements accurate to within 0.01 mm. Wood asked how it was possible that he could measure something to 0.01 mm from a 2 mm source, a physical impossibility in the propagation of any kind of wave. Blondlot replied, "That's one of the fascinating things about the N-rays. They don't follow the ordinary laws of science that you ordinarily think of." Wood then asked to see the experiments being run as usual, which took place in a room required to be very dark so the target was barely visible. Blondlot repeated his most recent experiments and got the same results—despite the fact that Wood had reached over and covertly sabotaged the N-ray apparatus by removing the prism.

=== Other examples ===
Langmuir offered additional examples of what he regarded as pathological science in his original speech:

- The Davis–Barnes effect (1929; after Professor Bergen Davis from Columbia University)
- Mitogenetic rays (1923; Alexander Gurwitsch and others)
- The Allison effect (1927; after Fred Allison). (b) (c)(d) (e)
- Extrasensory perception (1934), where Rhine consciously discarded contrary test results because he felt they could not be correct.

=== Later examples ===
A 1985 version of Langmuir's speech offered more examples, although at least one of these (polywater) occurred entirely after Langmuir's death in 1957:

- Water dowsing
- Martian canals (observed in late 19th century and early 20th century, they turned out to be optical illusions.)
- Certain reported photomechanical and electromechanical effects
- Biological effects of magnetic fields (see magnetobiology and magnet therapy) except magnetoception

== Newer examples ==
Since Langmuir's original talk, a number of newer examples of what appear to be pathological science have appeared. Denis Rousseau has cited as examples the cases of Martin Fleischmann's cold fusion and Jacques Benveniste's "infinite dilution".

=== Cold fusion ===
In 1989, Martin Fleischmann and Stanley Pons announced the discovery of a simple and cheap procedure to obtain room-temperature nuclear fusion. Although there were multiple instances where successful results were reported, they lacked consistency and hence cold fusion came to be considered to be an example of pathological science. Two panels convened by the US Department of Energy, one in 1989 and a second in 2004, did not recommend a dedicated federal program for cold fusion research. A small number of researchers continue working in the field.

=== Water memory ===
Jacques Benveniste was a French immunologist who in 1988 published a paper in the prestigious scientific journal Nature describing the action of high dilutions of anti-IgE antibody on the degranulation of human basophils, findings which seemed to support the concept of homeopathy. Biologists were puzzled by Benveniste's results, as only molecules of water, and no molecules of the original antibody, remained in these high dilutions. Benveniste concluded that the configuration of molecules in water was biologically active. Subsequent investigations have not supported Benveniste's findings.

== See also ==
- Fringe science
- Protoscience
- Research Integrity Risk Index
- Scientific misconduct
  - List of experimental errors and frauds in physics
  - List of topics characterized as pseudoscience
