= Wayne Jonas =

American physician

Wayne B. Jonas
- Education: Wake Forest University School of Medicine
- Occupation: Physician

Wayne B. Jonas is an American family physician, retired army medical officer, and alternative medicine researcher. He is the former president and CEO of the Samueli Institute. The institute does research into the efficacy of alternative medicine, such as on the effects of prayer on treating disease, use of homeopathy to fight bioterrorism, and use of magnetic healing devices on orthopedic injuries, with Jonas commenting on these research programs, "There is a good case for looking at these things scientifically, because we don't know a lot about them". He is professor of family medicine at Georgetown University and an adjunct professor at Uniformed Services University of the Health Sciences.

== Education ==
Jonas received his medical degree from Wake Forest University School of Medicine.

== Career ==
Jonas began his career as the Director of the Medical Research Fellowship at the Walter Reed Army Institute of Research. From 1995 to 1998, Jonas was the director of the Office of Alternative Medicine (since renamed the National Center for Complementary and Integrative Health), a branch of the National Institutes of Health. In 2001, the Samueli Institute was founded. Jonas has served as its president and CEO ever since.
