= Indian Institute of Toxicology Research =

Indian research institute

- Former name: Industrial Toxicology Research Centre
- Motto: Transforming Lives through Research & Innovation
- Established: 1965
- Research type: Toxicology Research
- Director: Dr. Bhaskar Narayan
- Location: Lucknow, Uttar Pradesh, India; 23.8594°N 80.9306°E
- Campus: Urban
- Affiliations: CSIR; AcSIR
- Website: iitrindia.org

The Indian Institute of Toxicology Research (previously the Industrial Toxicology Research Centre) is a laboratory run under the aegis of Council of Scientific and Industrial Research. It was established in 1965 by Sibte Hasan Zaidi and has its main campus in Lucknow with a satellite campus at Gheru. The research is centered in the Asia-Pacific region.
