= Inflammation Research =

- Discipline: Immunology
- Language: English
- Edited by: John A. Di Battista

Publication details
- Former name(s): Agents and Actions
- History: 1969-present
- Publisher: Springer Science+Business Media
- Frequency: Monthly
- Impact factor: 6.7 (2022)

Standard abbreviations
- ISO 4: Inflamm. Res.

Indexing
- CODEN: INREFB
- ISSN: 1023-3830 (print); 1420-908X (web)
- OCLC no.: 32011438

Links
- Journal homepage; Online archive

Inflammation Research is a monthly peer-reviewed medical journal covering immunology. It was established in 1969 as Agents and Actions, obtaining its current name in 1995. It is the official journal of the European Histamine Research Society and the International Association of Inflammation Societies. The editor-in-chief is John A. Di Battista (McGill University Health Center).

== Abstracting and indexing ==
The journal is abstracted and indexed in:

- Science Citation Index
- PubMed/MEDLINE
- Scopus
- Embase
- Chemical Abstracts Service
- Current Contents/Life Sciences

According to the Journal Citation Reports, the journal has a 2022 impact factor of 6.7.
