= Ionizer =

Ionizer or ioniser may refer to:

- Air ioniser
- Water ionizer

== See also ==
- Ionization
- Ionizing radiation
