= Magnetic water treatment =

Unproven method of supposedly reducing the effects of hard water

Magnetic water treatment (also known as anti-scale magnetic treatment or AMT) is a disproven method of reducing the effects of hard water by passing it through a magnetic field as a non-chemical alternative to water softening. A 1996 study by Lawrence Livermore National Laboratory found no significant effect of magnetic water treatment on the formation of scale. As magnets affect water to a small degree, and water containing ions is more conductive than purer water, magnetic water treatment is an example of a valid scientific hypothesis that failed experimental testing and is thus disproven. Any products claiming to utilize magnetic water treatment are absolutely fraudulent.

Vendors of magnetic water treatment devices frequently use photos and testimonials to support their claims, but omit quantitative detail and well-controlled studies. Advertisements and promotions generally omit system variables, such as corrosion or system mass balance analyticals, as well as measurements of post-treatment water such as concentration of hardness ions or the distribution, structure, and morphology of suspended particles.

== See also ==
- Fouling
- Laundry ball
- Magnet therapy
- Pulsed-power water treatment
