= Ion therapy =

Ion therapy may refer to:

- Negative air ionization therapy, the use of air ionisers as an experimental non-pharmaceutical treatment
- Particle therapy a medical radiotherapy (excluding neutron therapy)
