= Dolphin WaterCare =

- Product type: Pulse Powered Non-Chemical Water Treatment
- Registered as a trademark in: United States, various dates
- Website: Dolphin WaterCare

Dolphin WaterCare is a brand of environmentally responsible pulsed-power water treatment technology patented by Clearwater Systems Corporation. The system is designed to control scale, corrosion and biological activity in cooling towers without the use of chemicals, chemical tanks or pumps. The brand is used in various industries to treat water from cooling towers, chilling systems, heat exchangers, direct evaporative coolers, and hot water systems. In 2015 the company was acquired by EVAPCO.

== History ==
Dolphin WaterCare began in the early 1990s at the University of Connecticut. The founders developed the technology with a prototype by 1994. In 1998, Clearwater Systems Corporation was formed to market and sell the technology. The systems have been sold throughout North America, Europe, Australia, Russia, Southeast Asia, and selected areas of China and the Arabian Peninsula.

== Technology ==
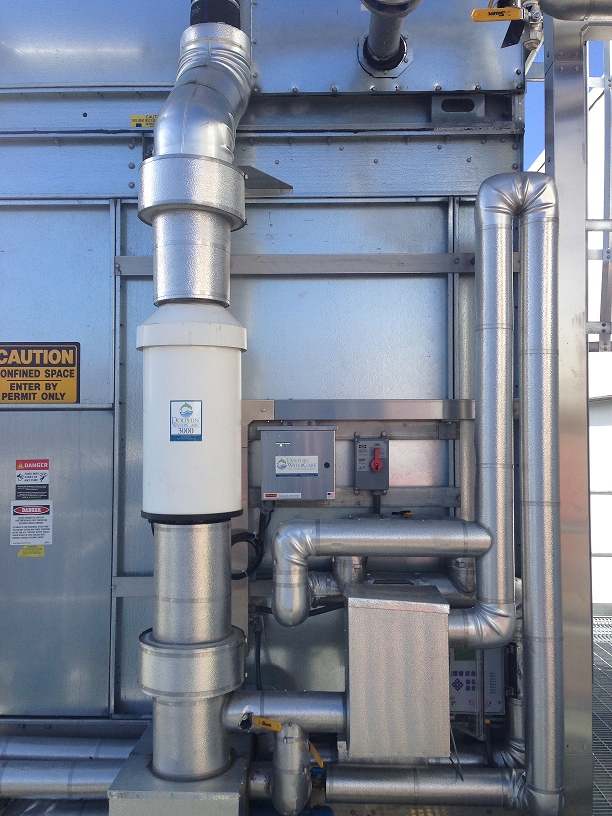
Dolphin WaterCare system – consisting of a treatment module and signal generator

Dolphin WaterCare uses pulsed-power to physically treat the water instead of using chemicals and is considered an environmentally friendly way to treat water. The pulsed-power imparts electromagnetic fields into the water to accomplish the treatment of the cooling water. The induced fields modify the surface charge of naturally occurring particles within the water. As a result, calcium and carbonate ions are no longer repelled allowing for rapid nucleation and growth of calcium carbonate in a powder form as opposed to precipitation of calcium carbonate crystal scale on HVAC equipment surfaces.

This form of water treatment is designed to provide control of bacteria, scale and corrosion:

=== Bacterial control ===
The Dolphin WaterCare system utilizes two methods of controlling microbial populations in cooling systems: encapsulation and electroporation. Encapsulation is a process that involves bacteria attaching themselves to the forming and growing calcium carbonate powder and ultimately trapped in the powder as it continues to grow. Electroporation is a process where bacteria cell membranes become compromised and destroyed as the cells are exposed to electromagnetic fields.

=== Corrosion control ===
Corrosion control is achieved by maintaining the treated water at or above calcium carbonate saturation which results in high pH levels. Alkaline cooling water typically ensures adequate protection to mild steel and copper alloys and thus, no corrosion inhibitors are required and equipment life is maximized without the use of chemicals.

=== Scale control ===
Cooling tower water treated with pulsed-power results in the precipitation of calcium carbonate as powder in the bulk water solution as opposed to precipitation of calcium carbonate crystal type scale on the equipment surfaces which can reduce heat transfer efficiency and shorten equipment life.

== Awards and accolades ==
In 2011 Dolphin WaterCare was listed as one of the Top 81 Money-Saving Products by Building Magazine. The same year it also received an Artemis Project Award in recognition of its impact on the field of water resource efficiency. It has also enabled customers of the product to secure Leadership in Energy and Environmental Design (LEED) points with more than 350 projects achieving LEED certification. Dolphin WaterCare solution was also a 2011 recipient of an Artemis Project Award, given to Clearwater Systems Corporation, in recognition of its impact on the field of water resource efficiency. The technology has also helped corporations such as Verizon win awards for having eco friendly processes.

== See also ==
- Pulsed-power water treatment
- Water treatment
