= Calgon (water softener) =

Brand of water softener products owned by the Anglo-Dutch concern Reckitt Benckiser

- Product type: Water softener
- Current owner: Reckitt Benckiser
- Country: United Kingdom
- Introduced: 1933; 93 years ago
- Markets: Europe
- Previous owners: Calgon, Inc.; Merck & Co.
- Tagline: Washing machines live longer with Calgon!
- Website: calgon.com

Calgon is a brand of water softener products owned by the Anglo-Dutch concern Reckitt Benckiser.

== Advertising ==
In Portugal, the Calgon advertisement jingle has been the same popular one for almost 30 years.

In Italy, Calgon was called Calfort from 1965 to early 2008.

In the UK & Ireland, Calgon started advertising on TV in March 1985 and it's still in use today.

== Criticism ==
In May 2011, a study by Which? magazine demonstrated that there was no evidence to suggest that washing machines lasted longer when treated with Calgon under "normal" washing conditions. Calgon disputes this, however. In October 2011, Dutch TROS TV program Radar also concluded Calgon water softener is not necessary under "normal" washing conditions for Dutch customers.
