= QT Inc. =

Manufacturer of the Q-Ray ionized bracelet

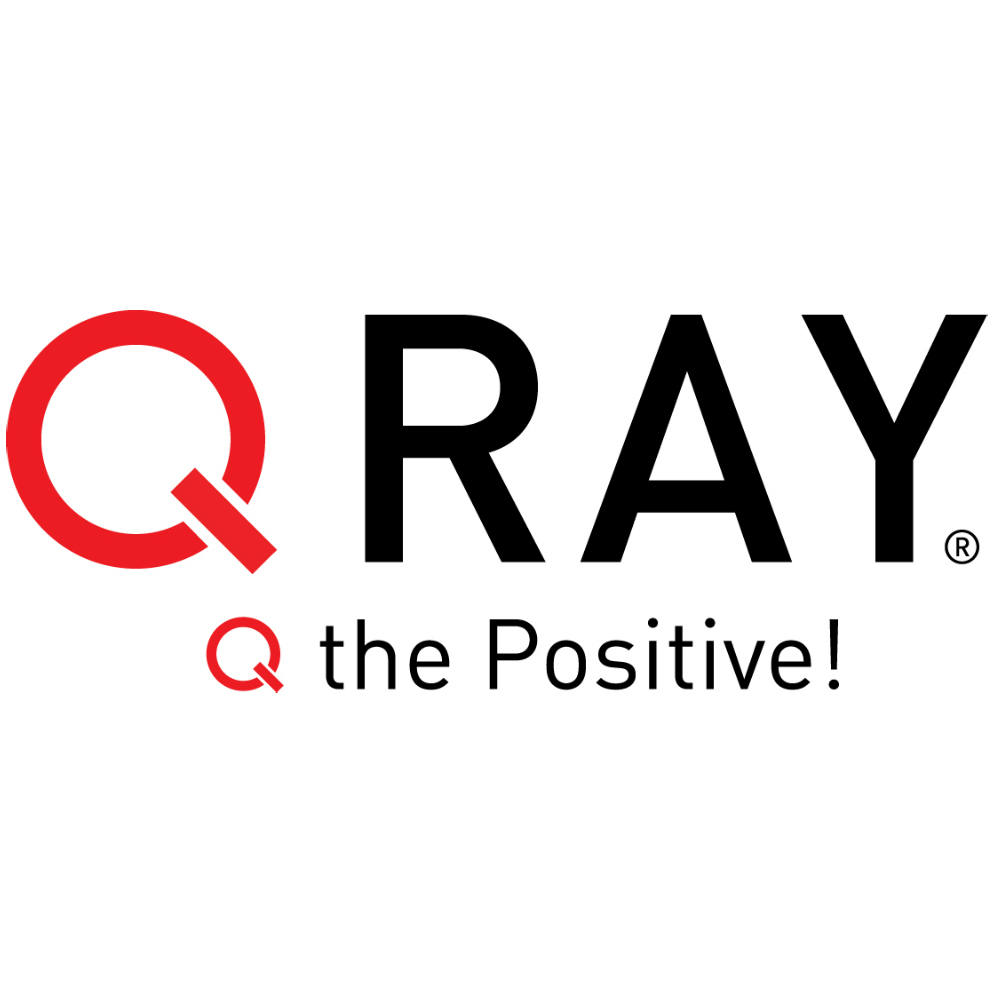
- Company type: Private
- Key people: Que Te "Andrew" Park
- Products: Ionized bracelet, Sport Socks
- Website: Official website

QT Incorporated is the manufacturer of the Q-Ray ionized bracelet and a line of sports socks. It is headed by the infomercial entrepreneur, Que Te "Andrew" Park. The Federal Trade Commission (FTC) has found the bracelets are part of a scheme devised to defraud consumers.

== Legal actions ==
The company was sued by the Federal Trade Commission in 2003 for false advertising.

=== 2003 FTC injunction ===
Mayo Clinic published a study in 2002 showing definitively that Q-Ray bracelets have no effect upon muscle pain relative to the placebo effect. This study prompted the Federal Trade Commission to impose an injunction on QT Inc. the following year, preventing any further claims regarding pain relief.

=== 2006 follow-up case ===
On September 8, 2006, a federal judge ordered QT Inc. to pay back $22.5 million "in ill-gotten gains." The defendants could owe even more—up to $87 million—depending on how many Q-Ray customers seek refunds. U.S. Magistrate Judge Morton Denlow wrote a 136-page opinion and concluded: "Park made up the theory that the bracelet works like acupuncture or Eastern medicine. He has no testing or studies to support his theory." Thus, the theory was made "...to defraud consumers out of millions of dollars by preying on their desire to find a simple solution to alleviate their physical pain." On January 3, 2007, the Seventh Circuit affirmed the lower court's ruling.

== Current state of affairs ==
QT Inc. continues to sell Q-Ray Bracelets online.

Q-Ray also sells Q-Ray Sport Socks which are claimed to enhance energy flow, increase positive energy, increase performance, and make the wearer feel taller.

== See also ==
- Power Balance
- List of topics characterized as pseudoscience
- Ionized bracelet
- Quackery
