= Clearwater Systems Corporation =

US water filtration company

- Headquarters: Middletown, Connecticut, United States
- Key people: Anupam Bhargava, CEO; Dean G. Nichols, CFO
- Products: Dolphin WaterCare
- Website: www.dolphinwatercare.com

Clearwater Systems Corporation is a privately held clean technology company located in Middletown, Connecticut. It sells pulsed-power water treatment systems branded as Dolphin WaterCare. The company was dissolved in 2015, with assets acquired by EVAPCO.

== History ==
Clearwater Systems Corporation was founded in 1988. The company was formed to produce and market the first Dolphin WaterCare model for use in chemical free water treatment in the commercial industry. In 2004 it expanded internationally. The company appointed Anupam Bhargava as its CEO in 2011 and the same year moved its headquarters to Middletown, Connecticut to the state's first ever green office complex.

== Awards and recognition ==
Clearwater Systems Corporation has won numerous awards for their Dolphin WaterCare products. It was selected as a recipient of a Top 100 Products Award in 2005 by Buildings Magazine and a Top 50 Water Company by Artemis Project in 2010. It has also been recognized for helping other companies win the Green Enterprise IT (GEIT) Award for use of their systems, including Verizon Wireless in 2012.
