= Magnet therapy =

Pseudoscientific alternative medicine practice

Magnetic therapy is a pseudoscientific alternative medicine practice involving the weak static magnetic field produced by a permanent magnet which is placed on the body. It is similar to the alternative medicine practice of electromagnetic therapy, which uses a magnetic field generated by an electrically powered device. Magnet therapy products may include wristbands, jewelry, blankets, and wraps that have magnets incorporated into them.

Practitioners claim that subjecting certain parts of the body to weak electric or magnetic fields has beneficial health effects. These physical and biological claims are unproven and no effects on health or healing have been established. Although hemoglobin, the blood protein that carries oxygen, is weakly diamagnetic (when oxygenated) or paramagnetic (when deoxygenated), the magnets used in magnetic therapy are many orders of magnitude too weak to have any measurable effect on blood flow. This is not to be confused with transcranial magnetic stimulation, a scientifically valid form of therapy, or with pulsed electromagnetic field therapy.

== Methods of application ==
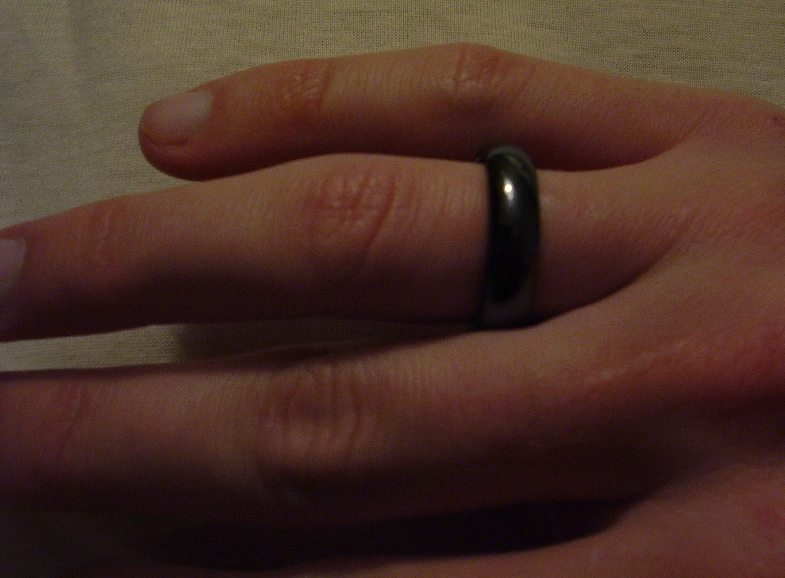
Magnetite ring

Magnet therapy involves applying the weak magnetic field of permanent magnets to the body, for purported health benefits. Different effects are assigned to different orientations of the magnet.

Products include magnetic bracelets and jewelry; magnetic straps for wrists, ankles, knees, and back; shoe insoles; mattresses; magnetic blankets (blankets with magnets woven into the material); magnetic creams; magnetic supplements; plasters/patches and water that has been "magnetized". These products generally use neodymium and ferrite magnets and the application is usually performed by the patient.

It is similar to the alternative medicine practice of electromagnetic therapy, which uses the weak electric or magnetic fields as well, but generated by electrically powered devices.

== Suggested mechanisms of action ==
Perhaps the most common suggested mechanism is that magnets might improve blood flow in underlying tissues. The field surrounding magnet therapy devices is far too weak and falls off with distance far too quickly to appreciably affect hemoglobin, other blood components, muscle tissue, bones, blood vessels, or organs. A 1991 study on humans of static field strengths up to 1 T found no effect on local blood flow. Tissue oxygenation is similarly unaffected. Some practitioners claim that the magnets can restore the body's hypothetical "electromagnetic energy balance", but no such balance is medically recognized. Even in the magnetic fields used in magnetic resonance imaging, which are many times stronger, none of the claimed effects are observed. If the body were meaningfully affected by the weak magnets used in magnet therapy, MRI would be impractical.

== Efficacy ==
Several studies have been conducted in recent years to investigate what role, if any, static magnetic fields may play in health and healing. Unbiased studies of magnetic therapy are problematic, since magnetisation can be easily detected, for instance, by the attraction forces on ferrous (iron-containing) objects; because of this, effective blinding of studies (where neither patients nor assessors know who is receiving treatment versus placebo) is difficult. Incomplete or insufficient blinding tends to exaggerate treatment effects, particularly where any such effects are small. Health claims regarding longevity and cancer treatment are implausible and unsupported by any research. More mundane health claims, most commonly about anecdotal pain relief, also lack any credible proposed mechanism and clinical research is not promising.

The American Cancer Society states that "available scientific evidence does not support these claims". According to the National Center for Complementary and Integrative Health, studies of magnetic jewelry have not shown demonstrable effects on pain, nerve function, cell growth or blood flow.

A 2008 systematic review of magnet therapy for all indications found insufficient evidence to determine whether magnet therapy is effective for pain relief, as did 2012 reviews focused on osteoarthritis and rheumatoid arthritis. These reviews found that the data was either inconclusive or did not support a significant effect of magnet therapy. They also raised concerns about allocation concealment, small sample sizes, inadequate blinding, and heterogeneity of results, some of which may have biased results.

== Safety ==
These devices are generally considered safe in themselves, though there can be significant financial and opportunity costs to magnet therapy, especially when treatment or diagnosis are avoided or delayed. Use is not recommended with pacemakers, insulin pumps, and other devices that may be negatively affected by magnetic fields.

== Reception ==
The worldwide magnet therapy industry totals sales of over a billion dollars per year, including $300 million per year in the United States alone.

A 2002 U.S. National Science Foundation report on public attitudes and understanding of science noted that magnet therapy is "not at all scientific." A number of vendors make unsupported claims about magnet therapy by using pseudoscientific and new-age language. Such claims are unsupported by the results of scientific and clinical studies.

=== Legal regulations ===
Marketing of any therapy as effective treatment for any condition is heavily restricted by law in many jurisdictions unless all such claims are scientifically validated. In the United States, for example, U.S. Food and Drug Administration regulations prohibit marketing any magnet therapy product using medical claims, as such claims are unfounded.

== See also ==
- List of topics characterized as pseudoscience
- List of ineffective cancer treatments
- Electrical devices in alternative medicine
- Bioelectromagnetics
- Detoxification foot baths
- Franz Mesmer
- Hologram therapy
- Ionized bracelet
- Magnetic water treatment
- Power Balance
- Rife machine
- Quackery
