= Stainless steel soap =

Piece of stainless steel

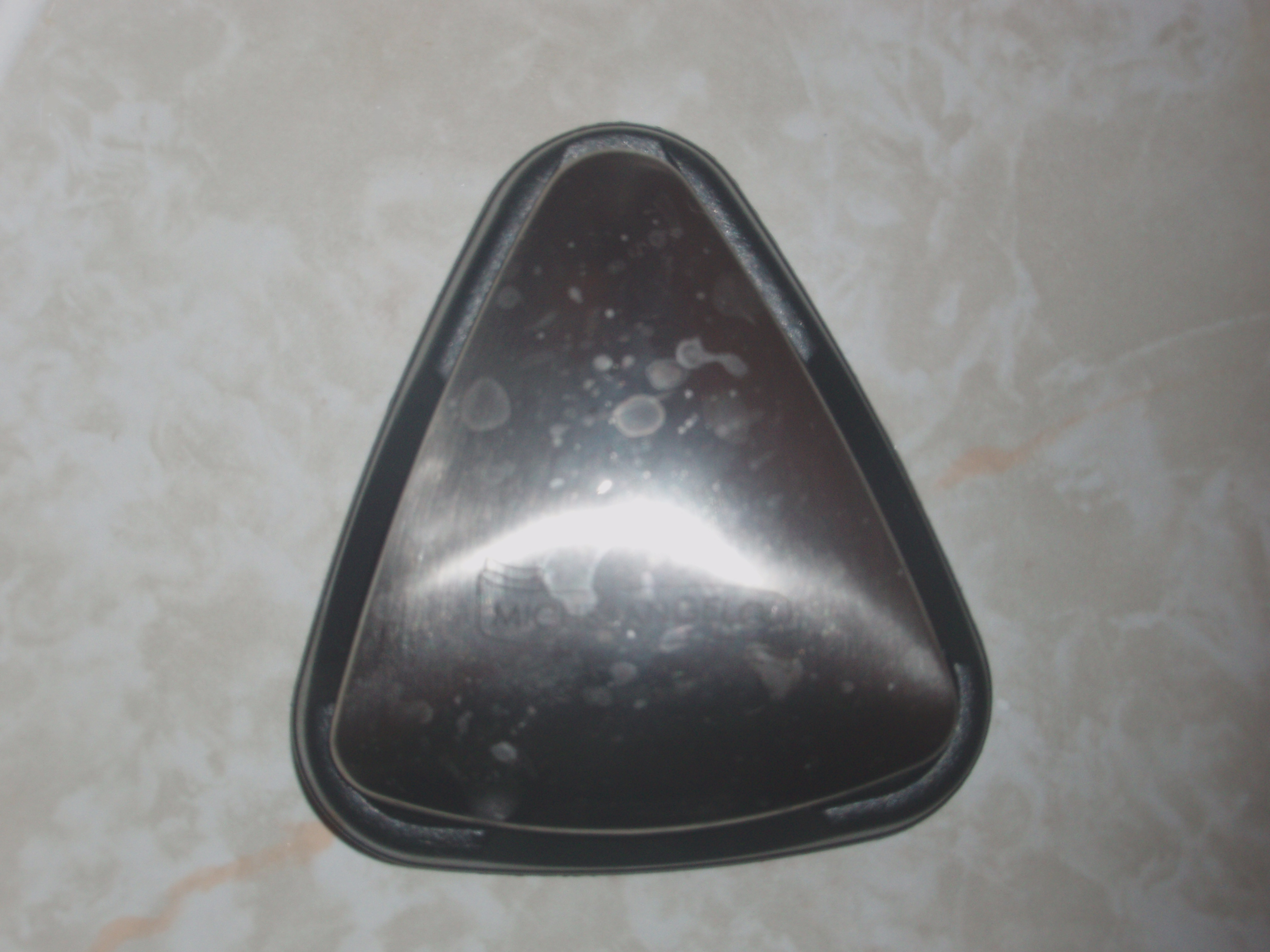
Example of a bar of stainless steel soap

Stainless steel soap is a piece of stainless steel, in the form of a soap bar or other hand-held shape. Its purpose is to neutralize or reduce strong odors such as those from handling garlic, onion, durian, guava, salami, or fish.

No published scientific studies are known to have been conducted on the efficacy of these soaps, about which serious doubts have been raised.

== Proposed mechanism ==
=== The chemistry of garlic ===
The characteristic taste and odor of garlic is due to an oily, slightly yellow organosulfur compound S-Allyl prop-2-ene-1-sulfinothioate, commonly called allicin. Fresh garlic has little odor until it is chopped or crushed. Allicin is produced from alliin (a derivative of the amino acid cysteine) by the enzyme alliinase. Allicin is unstable and breaks down to form other sulfur compounds such as diallyl sulfides. These compounds contribute to the smell of fresh garlic. When on the hands these sulfur compounds can further degrade into other sulfur compounds, including sulfuric acid, in the presence of water.

=== The chemistry of stainless steel ===
Steel is an alloy made up of iron mixed with carbon. Stainless steel is composed of steel mixed with at least 10.5% chromium, and often other elements such as nickel and molybdenum, etc. Chromium is added to make it resistant to rust. Stainless steels that are corrosion and oxidation resistant typically need more than 11% chromium. Nickel is added to increase the corrosion resistance further, and protect it from harsh environmental conditions. Molybdenum may be added to avoid pitting or scarring. The chemical properties of stainless steel can be further improved for specialized uses by adding other elements, e.g. titanium, vanadium and copper.

=== Possible mechanism ===
The chromium in stainless steel forms a passive oxide film on the surface of the metal, resulting in corrosion resistance. It is suggested that allicin and the other sulfur compounds (including sulfuric acid) react with the chromium oxide layer, some possibly being adsorbed onto it. Washing the stainless steel soap in water would remove this layer and with it the smelly sulfur compounds. The oxide film would then reform and the stainless steel soap can be reused.

Mark Lorch, Professor of Science Communication and Chemistry at the University of Hull and Joanna Buckley, Materials chemist and science communicator, at the University of Sheffield conducted some "citizen science" in 2016 to test this mechanism but there is no conclusive, rigorous evidence for it.

== Usage ==
Companies that produce stainless steel soaps claim that the odors these foods cause result from sulfur, which turns into sulfuric acid upon washing the hands. The aim of the stainless steel soap is to then bind to the sulfur molecules, thus removing them and the associated smell from the hands.

== See also ==
- Air ioniser
