= Thomas Clark (chemist) =

19th-century Scottish chemist

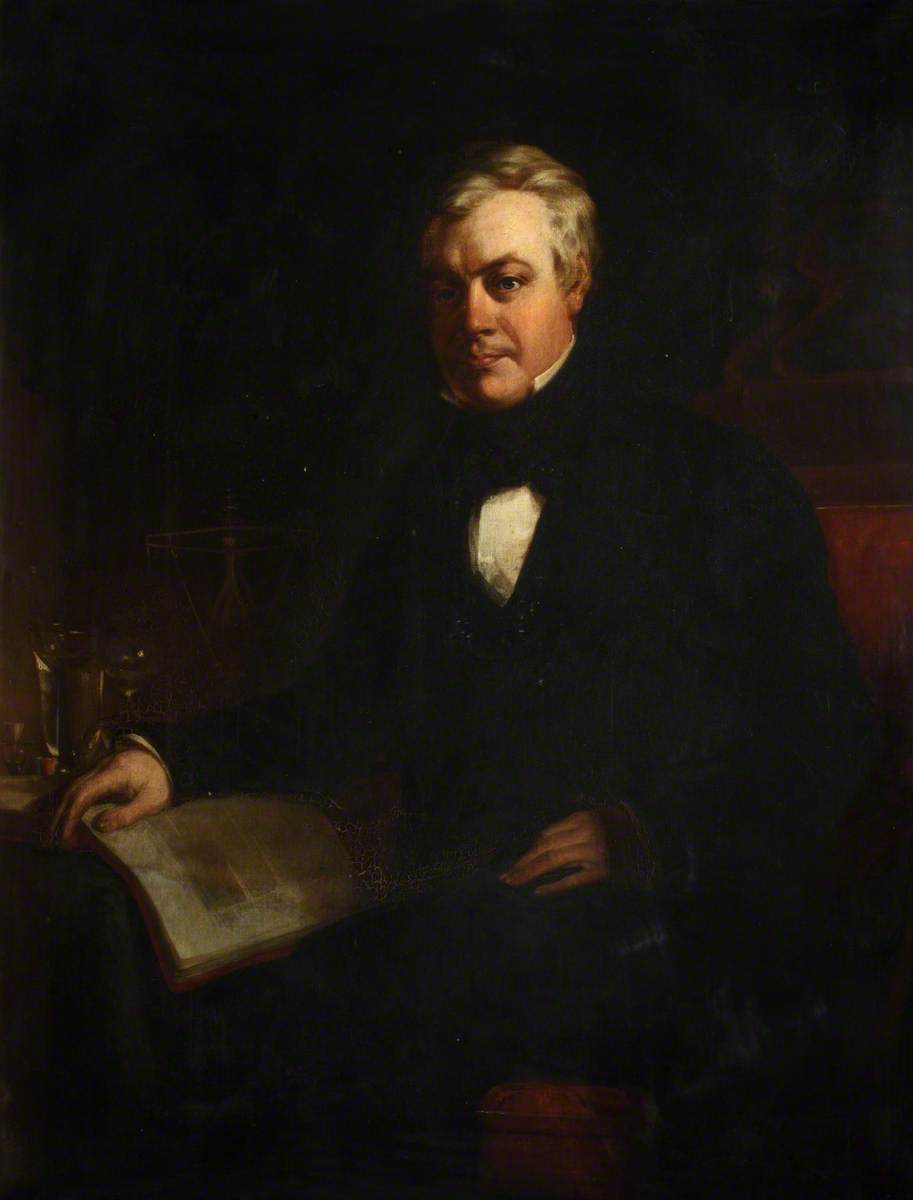

Thomas Clark (1801–1867) was a Scottish chemist.

He became known for the discovery of the phosphate of soda, and the process of lime softening of hard water the 'Clark process'. A Clark degree (°Clark) of water hardness is defined as one grain (64.8 mg) of CaCO_{3} per Imperial gallon (4.55 litres) of water, equivalent to 14.254 ppm and 10^5 parts of water.

== Life ==
Clark was born in Ayr, the son of a shipmaster and a needleworker. He went to school at the Ayr Academy, and then was placed in the counting-house of Charles Macintosh in Glasgow. After a few years he moved to the St. Rollox chemical works.

In 1836 Clark became lecturer on chemistry at the Glasgow Mechanics' Institution. To improve his standing in the scientific world, he entered as a candidate for the M.D. degree of Glasgow in 1827, completing his curriculum in 1831; in the interval he became apothecary to the infirmary (1829). In 1833 he was elected professor of chemistry in Marischal College, Aberdeen, after a competitive examination. He occupied the chair until the fusion of the Marischal College and University with King's College and University in 1860, when he was pensioned; but his career as a teacher had practically come to an end in 1843, due to bad health. He died on 27 November 1867. Clark took a seat in the university court of St. Andrews, as assessor appointed by the rector, John Stuart Mill, who had known him for many years.

== Works ==
Clark wrote pharmaceutical papers in the Glasgow Medical Journal in the later 1820s. In 1832 he contributed an article to the Westminster Review on weights and measures, and in 1834-5 two articles on the patent laws. In 1836 he discovered sodium pyrophosphate.

Clark is best known by his hard water tests and by his process for softening chalk waters. His soap test for hardness, patented in 1841, was quickly taken by the government for waters proposed to be supplied to towns. His other major invention was the process of softening waters rendered hard by the presence of calcium bicarbonate in solution, a process that Thomas Graham took as exemplary applied science. Although the process was favourably reported on to the government in 1851 by Graham, Miller, and Hoffmann, it was opposed by the metropolitan water companies, and was adopted in only a few places.

Clark was also a controversialist and pamphleteer. After he became unable to teach he studied English philology and grammar, and the gospels of the Greek Testament.
