= Coppy Laws =

Cecil Alfred "Coppy" Laws (21 November 1916 – 28 May 2002) was a British electronic engineer and radar engineer during World War II, and the inventor of the domestic air ioniser or ionizer.

== Life ==
C A "Coppy" Laws was born in Great Yarmouth, England, on 21 November 1916. In 1931 his father died, and the 14-year-old Cecil was boarded with a school friend's family, and came to terms with his loss by immersing himself in radio, his childhood hobby. He built the first TV in the street, and neighbours would crowd in to see the one hour of weekly broadcasting transmitted by the BBC. There was no money for further education, so he worked in a local shop recharging lead-acid accumulators for radios by day, and cycling 16 miles to evening classes and back, five nights a week for four years. This determination won him a first-class City and Guilds examination in radio communications.

In 1936, aged 20, Laws took a job at Philco. He had striking, copper-coloured hair, and a young secretary, Rita Hay, coined the nickname 'Coppy'. Coppy and Rita were married in 1942. The couple had five sons. He died on 28 May 2002.

== Work ==
In his mid-twenties he designed a range-finding system which allowed guns to home in on enemy ships beyond the horizon with accuracy and to fire a salvo the instant they were detected.

His achievements won recognition from the British Government in the form of a large cash award, similar to that given to Sir Frank Whittle, inventor of the jet engine.

At the outbreak of war he was seconded to the Admiralty to work on the development of radar. He resolved the key component of a design for a radar distance-measuring oscillator, a problem which at the time was defeating the young Herman Bondi and Fred Hoyle, part of the mathematical team backing up the radar designers.

After the war he was invited to form a radar division for Elliotts, the electrical engineering company. He helped create the East coast radar defence for the USA; set up Elliotts' first automation division; automated the oil pipelines in Saudi Arabia for Aramco; automated steel mills and paper mills and initiated and directed the first computer division.

Following the merger of Elliotts with GEC he left, not to take early retirement but to form his own business in the obscure field of electrical medicine.

According to Rosalind Tan (Co-author Mr Joshua Shaw) in her book The Truth About Air Electricity & Health, CA Laws had found out during his work on torpedoes for the Royal Navy that the German U-boats could stay under water longer and the crew stayed healthy because the air inside the U-boats was ionised. In fact, this is inaccurate: the first known use of ionisers in submarines was during the Cold War when Soviet submarines were so equipped.

In 1918 Alexander Chizhevsky had created the first air ioniser for ion therapy. This discovery was what had ignited Laws's interest in the little-known phenomenon of air ionisation, and with Idries Shah as co-director he formed Medion (not the German electronics company) to investigate the benefits to human health, performance and concentration.

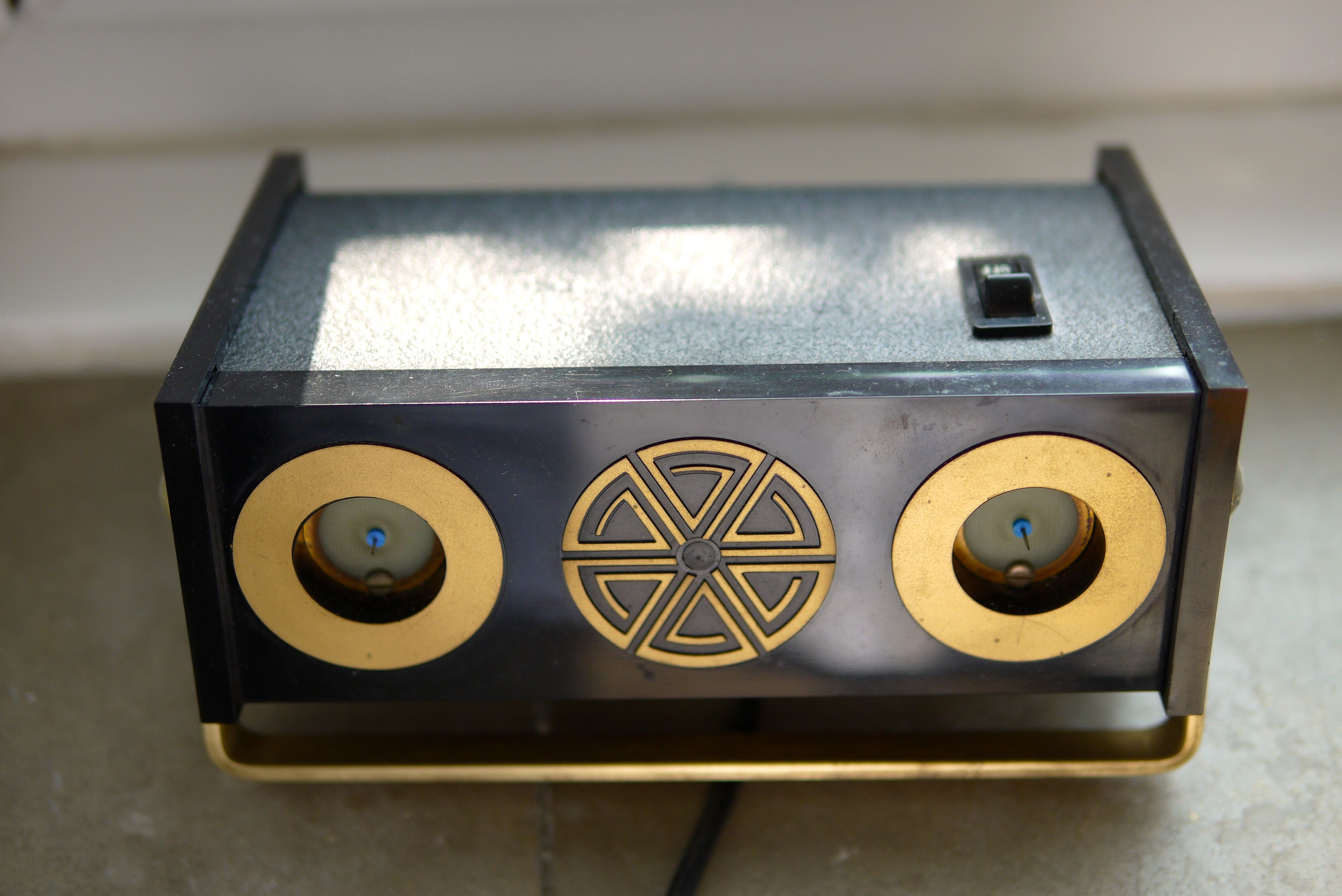
Airtone Medion Ioniser International portable model

== Development of the domestic air ioniser ==
Funding all the research himself, he developed the world's first effective home air ioniser. In the decades that followed, he became an international expert in electro-medical science. Other machines came on the market, all based on versions of his patents, but his instruments set the standard.

After Medion he set up a more modern company with his sons Julian and Keith which had hospital superbugs in its sight. The sons collaborated in a famed epidemiological university study at St James's University Hospital in Leeds, where it was said that: "Repeated airborne infections of the multi-resistant bacteria acinetobacter in an intensive care ward have been eliminated by the installation of negative air ionisers. Adjacent un-ionised wards continued to experience infections"
The results were encouraging and an article in New Scientist quoted Stephen Dean, a consultant at St James's Hospital in Leeds where the trial took place as saying: "The results have been fantastic – so much so that we have asked the university to leave the ionisers with us."

In 2009 the experiments were repeated at the University of London, the London Bioscience Innovation Centre, by Retroscreen Virology Ltd. under the supervision of Prof. John S. Oxford, who is also the chairman of the Hygiene Council. The results were just as encouraging. However this time the scientists were using the Japanese manufacturer Sharp's Plasmacluster Ion Technology. This technology incorporates ion generators which output both negative and positive ions.

Coppy Laws' ideas about the therapeutic effects of negative ions seem to have been lost in these experiments especially as the new machines generate both negative and positive ions.
