= Water ionizer =

Pseudoscientific home appliance

A water ionizer (also known as an alkaline ionizer) is a home appliance which claims to raise the pH of drinking water by using electrolysis to separate the incoming water stream into acidic and alkaline components. The treated water is called alkaline water. Proponents claim that consumption of alkaline water results in a variety of health benefits, making it similar to the alternative health practice of alkaline diets. Such claims violate principles of chemistry and physiology. There is no medical evidence for any health benefits of alkaline water. Extensive scientific evidence has debunked these claims, leaving such claims in the pseudoscientific realm.

The machines originally became popular in Japan and other East Asian nations before becoming available in the US and Europe.

== Health claims ==
Water ionizers are marketed on the basis of health claims which are focused on their ability to make water more alkaline. A wide variety of benefits have been claimed, including the ability to slow aging, prevent disease, give the body more energy, and offset alleged effects of acidic foods. Some claims include it being twice as hydrating after exercise.

There is no empirical evidence to support these claims, nor the claims that drinking ionized water will have a noticeable effect on the body. Drinking ionized water or alkaline water does not alter the body's pH due to acid-base homeostasis. Additionally, marketers have inaccurately claimed that the process of electrolysis changes the structure of water from large non-bioavailable water clusters to small bioavailable water clusters, called "micro clusters".

Some proponents of alkaline water and the alkaline diet as a whole claim a link between alkaline intake and cancer prevention; no scientific evidence exists for such a connection, and as such, several cancer societies have denounced this claim.

== Operation ==
Despite being described as water ionizers, the machines are designed to work as water electrolyzers. This is an electrochemical process in which water is split to form hydrogen and oxygen by an electric current. In some machines, the process produces calcium hydroxide and hydrochloric acid through the use of an ion-exchange membrane.

The effectiveness of the process is debatable because electrolysis requires significant amounts of time and power; hence, the amount of hydroxide that could be generated in a fast-moving stream of water such as a running tap would be minimal at best. Additionally, the process of reversing the reaction requires much less energy, so if the area between the alkaline and acidic water is at least semi-permeable, the water will undergo another reaction that just leaves neutral water.

== See also ==
- Alkaline diet
- Pseudoscience
- Quackery
- Electrodeionization
- Magnetic water treatment
- Negative air ionization therapy
- Self-ionization of water
- Ultrafiltration
