= Dryer ball =

Laundry device for tumble dryers

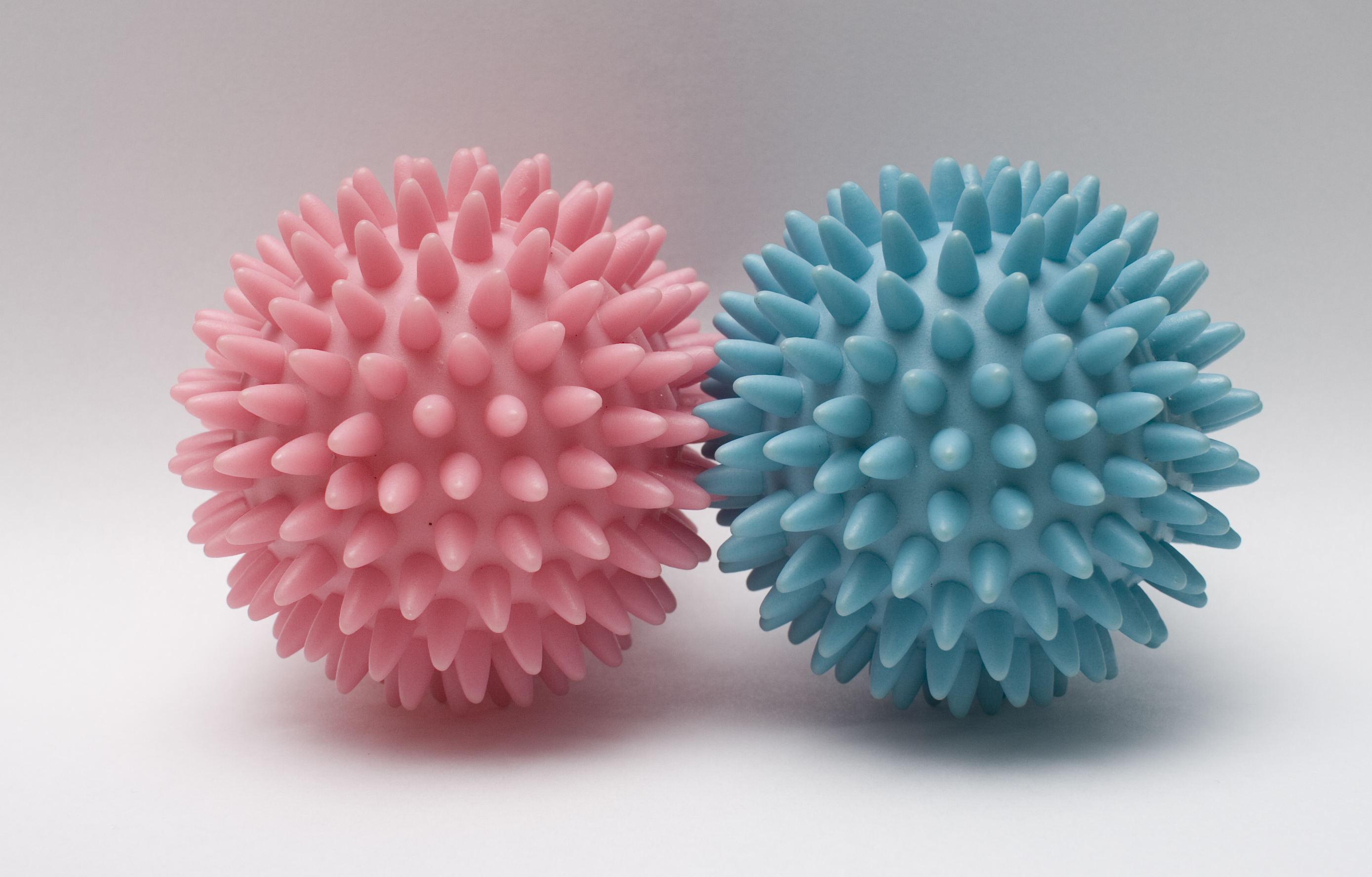
Two dryer balls

A dryer ball is a spherical laundry device for tumbling clothes dryers used as an alternative to fabric softener, reducing static electricity or softening clothing, or to accelerate the drying process.

== Material composition ==
Dryer balls are typically manufactured out of felted wool (the original material used for manufacture), rubber, or plastic. Wool variants are typically smooth, while rubber or plastic variants typically include spiked protrusions and may be shaped differently than a sphere. Rubber and plastic balls are more durable than woolen ones, which need periodic replacement depending on frequency of use.

== Mechanism of action ==
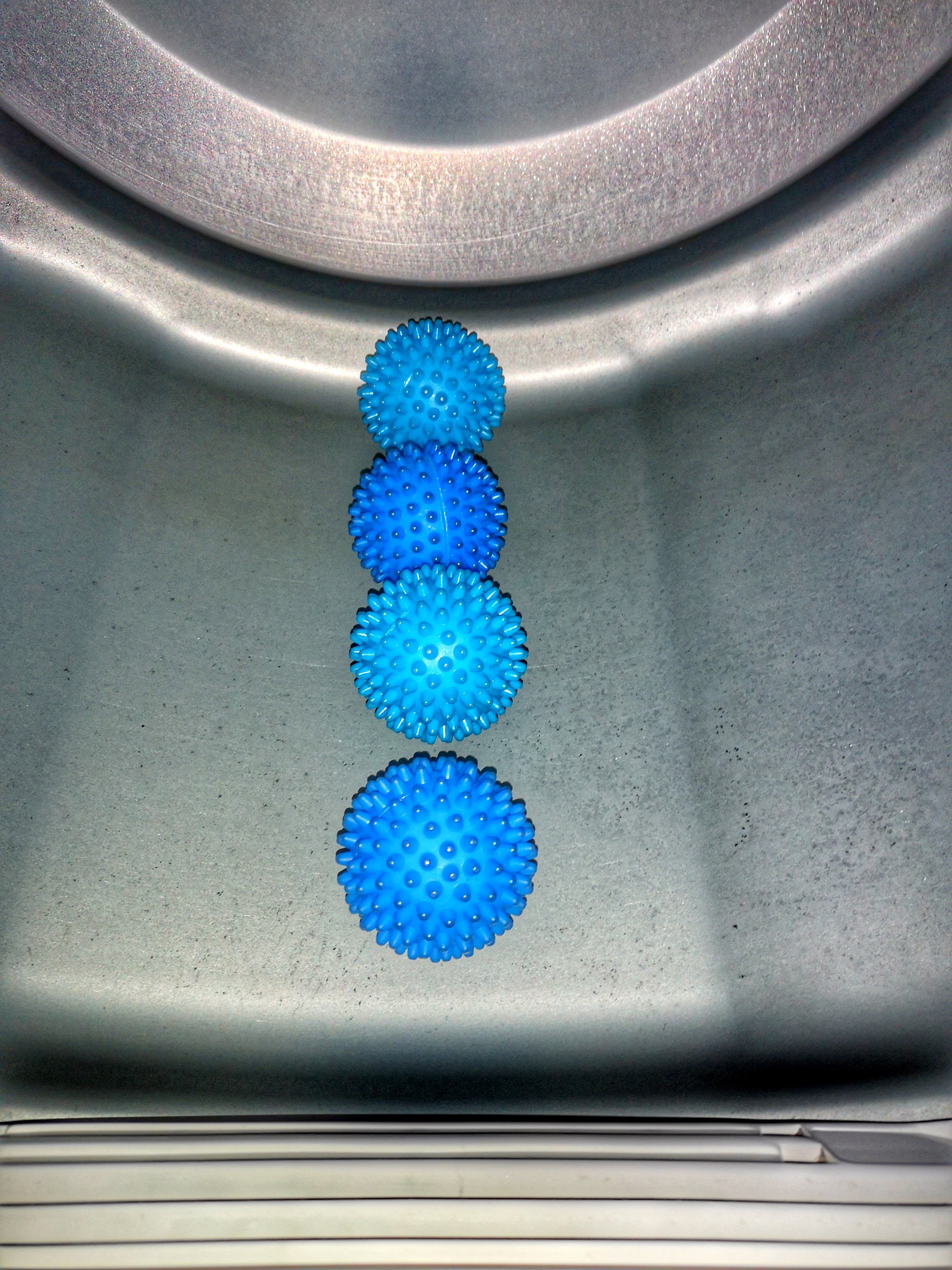
Four spiked rubber-type dryer balls sitting in the bottom of an empty dryer

Dryer balls are said to act as a moving buffer, preventing wet laundry from coalescing in the dryer, allowing increased air flow. A study has shown dryer balls mix into the fabric load as it is lifted by the dryer drum, but experience higher speeds than fabrics and decelerate rapidly when tumbling. The material and design of the ball varies its properties: wool balls are said to absorb moisture, accelerating drying. Conventional fabric softener often gives a fragrance via aroma compound to clothing. While typically unscented by default, wool dryer balls can be used to perfume laundry via application of essential oils to the balls before use.

=== Disputed efficacy ===
The efficacy of plastic dryer balls was disputed by Popular Mechanics who, in 2009, published experiment results in which staff were unable to find any beneficial effects.

== Purported benefits ==
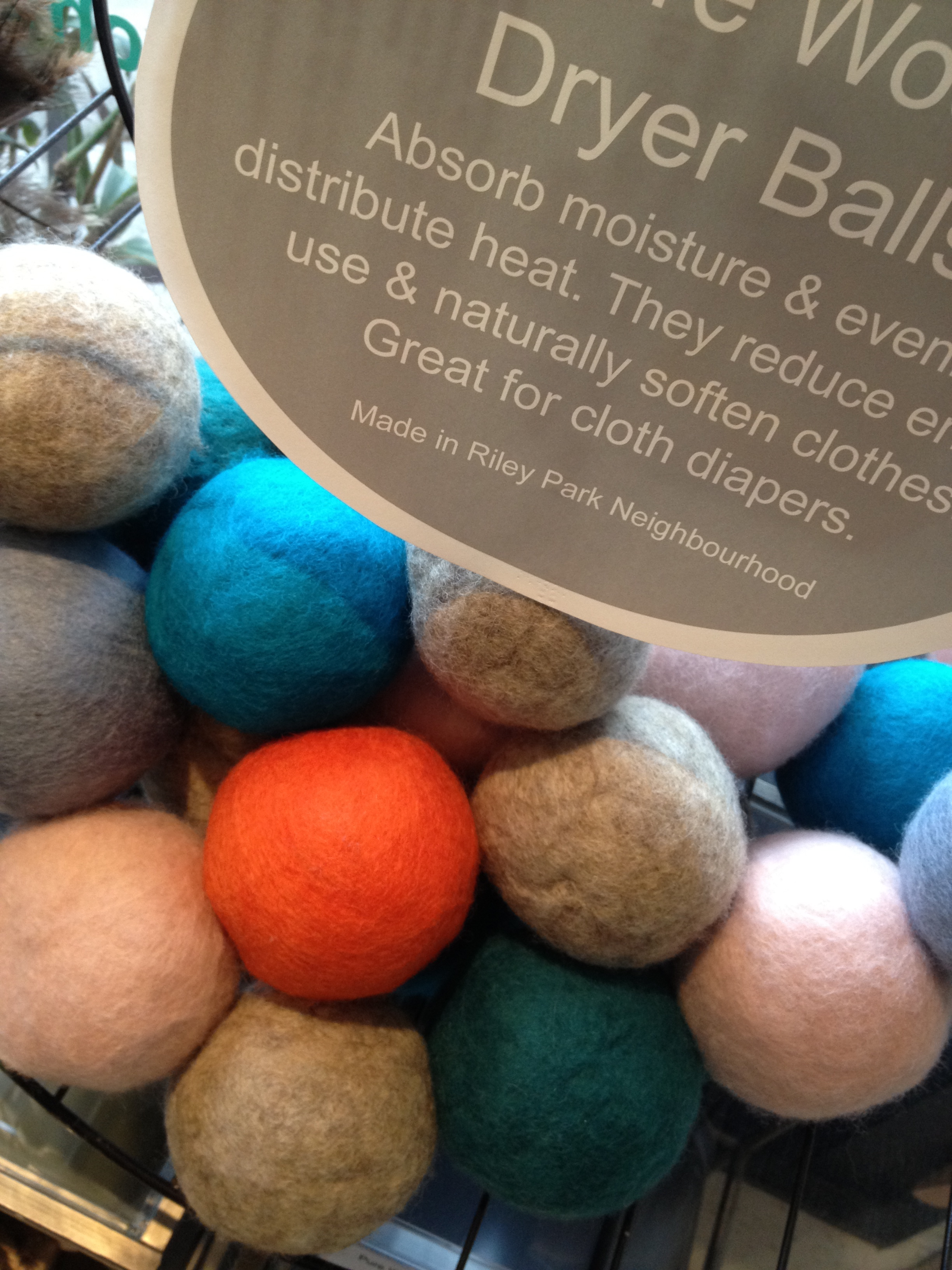
Pile of different colored wool dryer balls retailing in Vancouver, Canada in 2011. A sign above purports benefits for the balls.

=== Eco-friendly ===
Dryer balls are touted to be environmentally friendly for varying reasons versus conventional fabric softeners. Conventional softeners primarily function chemically, employing quaternary ammonium cation or stearic acid, which is either suspended in liquid or applied to polyester in the case of dryer sheets. Dryer balls function mechanically and are reusable, compared to dryer sheets which are typically one-use products. Wool dryer balls are typically biodegradable, however can sometimes be chemically altered or bleached, reducing eco-friendliness. The increased drying speeds claimed by using dryer balls helps reduce energy use.

=== Hypoallergenic ===
Dryer balls are sometimes touted as hypoallergenic or better for those with sensitive skin as they typically do not apply artificial softening agents or fragrances to clothing.

== See also ==
- Fabric softener
- Laundry ball
- Washing machine
