= Hologram bracelet =

Unproven performance-enhancing device

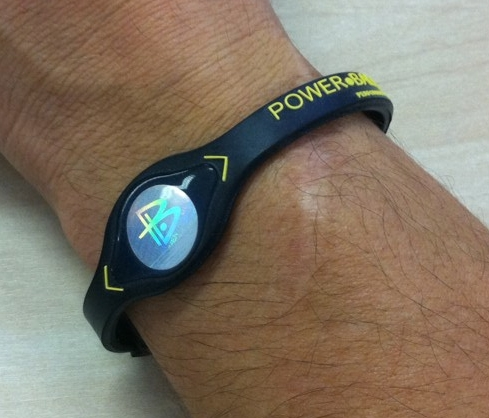
A Power Balance branded hologram bracelet

A hologram bracelet or energy bracelet is a small rubber wristband supposedly fitted with a hologram. Manufacturers have said that the holograms supposedly "optimise the natural flow of energy around the body," and, "improve an athlete's strength, balance and flexibility". Only anecdotal evidence supports these claims and tests performed by the Australian Skeptics, the University of Wales Institute, Cardiff, and the RMIT's School of Health Sciences have been unable to identify any effect on performance.

== Products ==
Hologram bracelets include a small hologram which manufacturers say is "programmed" through an undisclosed process. Power Balance, who have manufactured the bracelets since 2007, say that the programming "mimics Eastern philosophies". The holograms are most usually installed in bracelets and wristbands but are also sold as pendants or necklaces, anklets, shoe inserts, pet tags, or separately for users to apply to the back of a watch, for example.

Manufacturers including Power Balance and EFX Performance make no claims on their websites for their products, but carry testimonials from users who say that they improve athletic performance. Until 2010, Power Balance said that their bracelets helped improve an athlete's strength, balance and flexibility because the holograms are embedded with an "electrical frequency" that restores the body's "electrical balance" on contact with its natural energy field. In December 2010, following a successful legal action by the Australian Competition & Consumer Commission, Power Balance admitted that there was no credible scientific evidence for these claims.

== Response ==
Mark Hodgkinson, writing in The Daily Telegraph in 2010, called hologram bracelets a fad with many professional athletes seen wearing them and several actively endorsing them. Footballers David Beckham and Cristiano Ronaldo have worn them, and tennis players Sam Querrey and Mardy Fish both wore them during the final of the 2010 Queen's Club Championships. Endorsements for the Power Balance bracelet have come from Shaquille O'Neal, Rubens Barrichello, and the London Wasps rugby team, while ice hockey team the Cardiff Devils announced a partnership with Power Balance in early 2010. NASCAR reported in 2011 that many drivers wore EFX Performance bracelets with the Hendrick Motorsports and Stewart–Haas Racing teams entering into licensing deals.

Several groups have investigated the effects of hologram bracelets on athletic performance. A 2011 study by RMIT University's School of Health Sciences found that there was an overall decrease in the balance and stability of wearers, although it was not statistically significant, and the overall conclusion was that the bracelets did not affect performance. The Australian Skeptics group found that the bracelets have no more than a placebo effect.

Research by the University of Wales Institute, Cardiff, commissioned by the BBC, also found that wearing the bracelets did not affect performance in standard sports industry tests, adding that neither the physiology nor the biology of wearers was changed. However, Dr Gareth Irwin, who carried out the tests, said that there may be changes in performance because of the placebo effect, a view which has been echoed by sports psychologists. Sports psychologist Victor Thompson says the bracelets play on superstition, simply giving people the expectation that they can improve their sporting performance. Cricket coach Jeremy Snape said he prefers that athletes have belief in themselves rather than in an external product, while Roberto Forzoni described the bracelets as "gimmicks" which allow athletes to avoid addressing real issues in their performance, with the high-profile endorsements giving the sense of belonging to an elite group of athletes.

== See also ==
- Amulet
- Energy (esotericism)
- Ionized bracelet
- List of topics characterized as pseudoscience
- Scientific skepticism
- Magnet therapy
- Mood ring
- Quackery
- Talisman
