= Lime softening =

Water softening method

Lime softening (also known as lime buttering, lime-soda treatment, or Clark's process) is a type of water treatment used for water softening, which uses the addition of limewater (calcium hydroxide) to remove hardness (deposits of calcium and magnesium salts) by precipitation. The process is also effective at removing a variety of microorganisms and dissolved organic matter by flocculation.

== History ==
Lime softening was first used in 1841 to treat Thames River water. The process expanded in use as the other benefits of the process were discovered. Lime softening greatly expanded in use during the early 1900s as industrial water use expanded. Lime softening provides soft water that can, in some cases, be used more effectively for heat transfer and various other industrial uses.

== Chemistry ==
As lime in the form of limewater is added to raw water, the pH is raised and the equilibrium of carbonate species in the water is shifted. Dissolved carbon dioxide (CO_{2}) is changed into bicarbonate (HCO^{−}_{3}) and then carbonate (CO^{2-}_{3}). This action causes calcium carbonate to precipitate due to exceeding the solubility product. Additionally, magnesium can be precipitated as magnesium hydroxide in a double displacement reaction.

In the process both the calcium (and to an extent magnesium) in the raw water as well as the calcium added with the lime are precipitated. This is in contrast to ion exchange softening where sodium is exchanged for calcium and magnesium ions. In lime softening, there is a substantial reduction in total dissolved solids (TDS) whereas in ion exchange softening (sometimes referred to as zeolite softening), there is no significant change in the level of TDS.

Lime softening can also be used to remove iron, manganese, radium and arsenic from water.

== Future uses ==
Lime softening is now often combined with newer membrane processes to reduce waste streams. Lime softening can be applied to the concentrate (or reject stream) of membrane processes, thereby providing a stream of substantially reduced hardness (and thus TDS), that may be used in the finished stream. Also, in cases with very hard source water (often the case in Midwestern USA ethanol production plants), lime softening can be used to pre-treat the membrane feed water.

== Waste products ==
Lime softening produces large volumes of a mixture of calcium carbonate and magnesium hydroxide in a very finely divided white precipitate which may also contain some organic matter flocculated out of the raw water. Processing or disposal of this sludge material may be an additional cost to the process. Drying and re-calcining the waste allows the lime to be almost fully re-cycled, but drying and re-calcining is more expensive than producing new lime from limestone.
