= Ionized jewelry =

Type of metal bracelet jewelry

An Ionized bracelet, or ionic bracelet, is a type of metal bracelet jewelry purported to affect the chi of the wearer. No claims of effectiveness made by manufacturers have ever been substantiated by independent sources, and the US Federal Trade Commission (FTC) has found the bracelets are "part of a scheme devised to defraud".

Q-Ray, Balance, Bio-Ray, iRenew, Rayma, and Rico's Bio-Energy brand bracelets are considered to be of the "ionized" family. Other alternative health bracelets, such as magnetic or copper therapy bracelets, are considered a different type of product.

== History ==
In October 1973, corporate websites claim, Manuel L. Polo began investigating the effects of different metals on humans, believing that some metals offered a benefit when worn. This led directly to his creation of the Bio-Ray (Biomagnetic Regulator), the first ionized bracelet.

In 1994, Andrew Park bought a Bio-Ray bracelet while visiting Barcelona, Spain. Believing that it had reduced his lower back pain, he was inspired to found QT Inc., which began manufacturing and selling Q-Ray bracelets in the United States by 1996.

=== Marketing claims ===
Western interest in the Q-Ray Ionized Bracelet rose as a result of an infomercial campaign by QT Inc., which ran from August 2000 through June 11, 2003. During this time many marketing claims were made regarding the product's alleged effectiveness, most notably regarding relief from pain and arthritis due to manipulation of a body's chi.

In a Marketplace interview, Charles Park, president of Q-Ray Canada, explains that the term "ionized" does not mean the bracelets themselves are ionized, but rather that the term comes from their secret "ionization process" which, he asserts, affects the bracelets in undisclosed ways.

=== FTC action ===
These claims were the topic of a 2003 injunction by the Federal Trade Commission and later a high-profile court ruling in 2006. The court was unable to find any basis for QT Inc.'s claims related to traditional Chinese medicine, concluding that it was "part of a scheme devised by QT Inc to defraud its consumers".

== Criticism ==
Ionized jewelry, such as Q-Ray, has been heavily criticized based on multiple factors.

=== Pseudoscientific theory ===
Alternative health bracelets such as ionized jewelry are currently characterized as pseudoscience. Q-Ray's theory is grounded in traditional Chinese medicine (TCM) and poses similar benefits to acupuncture, another practice designed to balance the flow of qi and is controversial in scientific communities regarding its efficacy. Their website claims to optimize your natural positive energy and restore balance. No scientific research supporting these claims is referenced anywhere on their website or store. Instead, they advertise and rely heavily on testimonials as anecdotal evidence. No currently available research from third parties has verified their claims.

=== Radioactivity ===
Several wearable products marketed as "negative ion generators" have been found to contain radioactive thorium or uranium, apparently to generate negative ions as a result of radioactive decay. While the activity is typically low, adverse effects from cumulative exposure to the radioactivity in these products cannot be ruled out.

=== Research ===
A placebo controlled randomized trial study published in the journal Mayo Clinic Proceedings compared the effect of an ionized bracelet produced by Q-ray to an identically appearing placebo bracelet. The study found no difference between the ionized bracelet and control with respect to musculoskeletal pain, suggesting the effects of the Q-ray bracelet were due to the placebo effect.

== See also ==
- List of topics characterized as pseudoscience
- Quackery
- Negative air ionization therapy
- Power Balance
- Hologram bracelet
- Magnet therapy
- Energy medicine
