= Laundry ball =

Product promoted as a substitute for laundry detergent

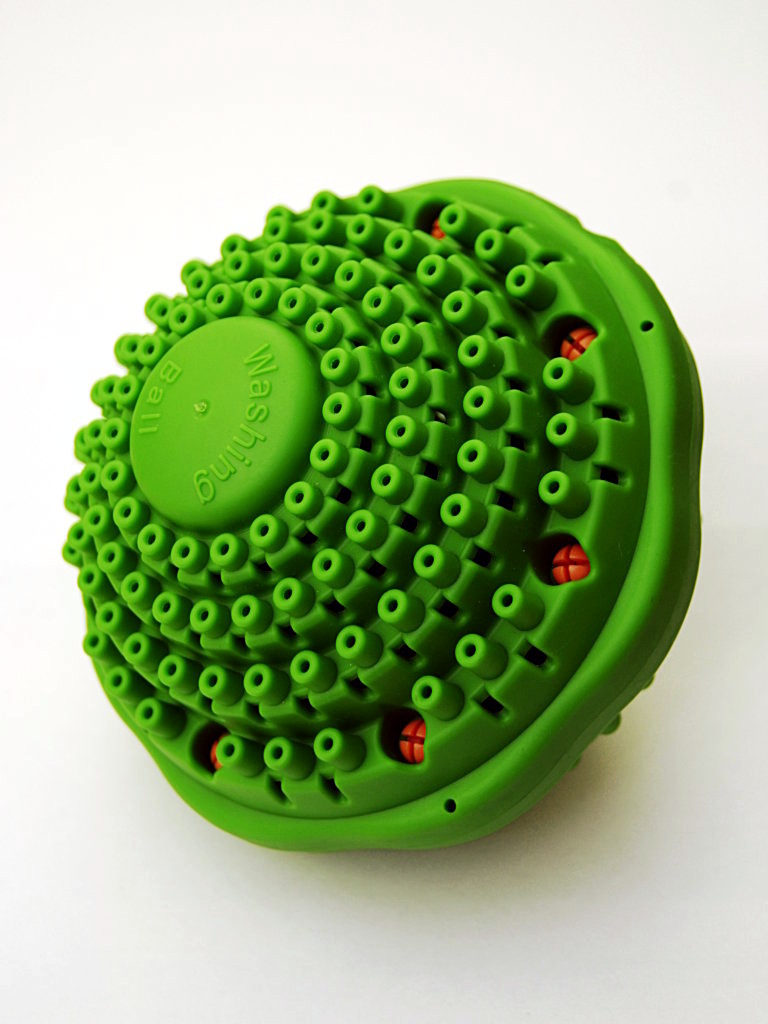
The Swedish "Magicball" is an example of a pseudoscientific washing ball product.

A laundry ball or washing ball is a product made of solid, insoluble material promoted as a substitute for laundry detergent. Producers of laundry balls often make pseudoscientific claims about their mechanisms of action and exaggerate the extent of their benefits.

Washing with laundry balls is as effective or less effective than washing without detergent. Their observed cleaning effects can largely be attributed to the mechanical interactions with the laundry or to using hot water instead of cold. For mechanical agitation, no evidence exists that using a specialized laundry ball is superior to using a different, cheaper solid object, such as a golf ball.

The Federal Trade Commission has taken action against manufacturers for making misleading claims, while customer protection organizations have recommended against buying this type of product.

== Types ==
Laundry balls come in several shapes: disks, spheres and toruses (doughnut shapes). Some contain ceramic pieces, magnetic material, or coloured liquid claimed to be "activated water", none of which have been demonstrated to improve effectiveness. Some balls can be refilled with pellets of detergent or other ingredients.

In the United States, laundry balls have been sold on home shopping channels or by participants in multilevel marketing. They can also be found in retail stores with an ecological or environmental focus. During the initial marketing boom, balls were manufactured for other market niches, like washing cars. For the purpose of washing a car, a normal cloth or sponge will have the same effect of mechanical removal of dirt and grime.

== Claimed mechanisms of action ==
Manufacturers rarely agree on why their laundry balls work, which suggests that each manufacturer makes these claims up. Some claims are not backed by science, while others are an exaggeration of benefits. Balls that contain detergents may offer more cleaning power than water alone because their ingredients are comparable to normal washing powder, but in smaller quantities.

The effect of the laundry balls may be explained by simple mechanical action and by the usage of hotter water. Some manufacturers claim that their products reduce energy consumption, but their pamphlets recommend using hot water. Hot water will clean some types of spots better than cold water, and mechanical agitation by any solid object can assist in cleaning, leading some people to conclude that the balls worked.

Although laundry balls are marketed as economical, environmentally friendly alternatives that can reduce water and energy consumption, they have not been demonstrated to be more effective than washing without detergent. Their observed cleaning effects can largely be attributed to the mechanical interactions with the laundry or to using hot water instead of cold. The mechanical action of the laundry balls can help clean some types of spots, but a golf ball will achieve the same effect for much less money.

Apart from issues with effectiveness, there is also a risk of the balls breaking open during washing, which could damage the machinery of the washing machine.

=== Infrared ===
Some manufacturers claim that the components inside their balls emit far infrared rays, which are claimed to reduce the surface tension of water and facilitate washing. All materials emit thermal radiation, and at room temperature or washing machine temperature, this is in the far infrared range. It is also true that heating reduces the surface tension of water, but this energy comes from the water heater; otherwise, it would violate the law of conservation of energy.

=== Magnetic properties ===
Magnetic water softeners claim that their magnetic fields can help remove scale from the washing machine and pipes and prevent new limescale from adhering. Some companies claim to remove hardness ions from hard water or to precipitate the molecules in the water so they will not "stick" to the pipes or to reduce the surface tension of water. The claims are dubious, the scientific basis is unclear, the working mechanism is vaguely defined and understudied, and high-quality studies report negative results. The reputation of these products is further damaged by the pseudoscientific explanations that promoters keep putting forward.

A laundry ball containing magnets could be used in niche applications for the removal of magnetic material, such as iron filings on a steel worker's clothing, in which case the benefit would be clearly visible in the form of collected iron filings. For the typical consumer, however, there would be no benefit, and such a device may get stuck on a washing machine with a steel drum, disrupting its engineered balance and increasing vibration, decreasing the machine's lifespan.

=== Changes to water structure ===
Some magnetic products claim that they "change the molecular structure of water", a pseudoscientific claim with zero scientific basis. There is no such thing as "magnetized water". Water is not paramagnetic, so its water molecules do not align in the presence of a magnetic field. Water is weakly diamagnetic (so it is repelled by magnets), but only to an extent so small that it is undetectable to most instruments.

=== Special detergent ===
Some balls are refillable with small pellets of detergent which are sold only by the manufacturer of the ball. Critics question whether the amount and type of detergent released by these balls is sufficient to generate significant cleaning effects.

== Customer protection ==
In 1997, Amway offered a ceramic washing disk on its catalog but removed it after concluding that it had "no measurable impact on overall cleaning."

In 1997, Trade-Net sold a laundry ball product (the Blue Laundry Ball) in various states. Trade-Net claimed that the blue liquid inside their balls was structured water "that emits a negative charge through the walls of the container into your laundry water." "This causes the water molecule cluster to disassociate, allowing much smaller individual water molecules to penetrate the innermost part of the fabric." Dennis Barnum, a professor of inorganic chemistry at Portland State University, said that the liquid was just water with a blue dye and could not possibly have the effect claimed by the manufacturer. Barnum also said that the claims were "gibberish" and used scientific terms in ways that sounded educated to the layman but did not make any real sense. The Oregonian tested the balls and found they washed marginally better than hot water with no detergent and worse than using detergent.

After complaints, Trade-Net's claims were investigated by customer protection departments in Utah, Oregon, and Florida, among others, and the company was prohibited from making certain claims, including that "such product cleans as well as conventional laundry detergent". Trade-Net offered a 'new' laundry ball product after this, but were forced to pay fines, including $190,000 to Oregon's Department of Justice, $10,000 to Utah and then in April 1999, $155,000 to the states of New York, Arizona, Arkansas, Hawaii, Idaho, Illinois, Michigan, Missouri, Nebraska, Nevada, Oklahoma and the FTC. The company disappeared shortly thereafter. The Federal Trade Commission has levied fines against other companies for similar fraudulent claims. However, other companies kept selling similar products over the Internet.

The judge ruling against Trade-Net, issued in April 1999, said the manufacturers failed to substantiate their claims and hadn't informed consumers about reports showing that the claims were incorrect.

The Australian Consumers' Association published a report in the April 1998 issue of its magazine Choice. It concluded that laundry balls were no better than cold water.

The US Federal Trade Commission published in 1999 about laundry balls, rings, and discs: "Tests show that these gadgets do little more than clean out your wallet. At best, they’re marginally better than washing clothes in hot water alone and not as effective as washing them with laundry detergent. At worst, the products are completely useless."

In 2000 the magazine Good Housekeeping tested several laundry balls sold in the US and concluded that "these gizmos do little more than clean out your wallet."

In April 2009 the Italian consumer association Altroconsumo carried a small test and concluded that laundry balls didn't wash better than plain water.

In 2009 the Spanish customer protection organization OCU studied ecobolas (a type of laundry ball marketed in Spain). It compared the efficacy of the laundry ball, normal detergent, and no detergent at all. It concluded that laundry balls were no better than using just water, and it recommended that consumers simply use a minimum amount of detergent.

In November 2011, the Hong Kong Consumer Council published a report on the effect of using washing liquid, washing powder, and washing balls. The former two were effective in removing stains, while the washing balls were not more effective than plain water.

Some organizations recommending against their use are Consumers Union, International Fabricare Institute (now called Drycleaning and Laundry Institute), Maytag, Soap and Detergent Association, and Spanish OCU.

In February 2011, the Spanish National Institute of Consume (Instituto Nacional del Consumo INC) ordered 14 manufacturers to cease their deceptive advertising after testing the wash balls and concluding that they are only as effective, or even less effective, than washing with water alone.

In August 2012, the Portuguese Consumer Rights Council requested a ban on the washing balls because none of the advantages advertised were proven in tests.

The Australian customer advocacy group Choice Australia gave a "Shonky Award" to Nanosmart Laundry Balls in October 2015, stating that they "don't work" and that they should be renamed "Nano-not-so-smart" after testing the balls against plain water and finding they had no effect and that their scientific claims were simply untrue. Choice Australia states that they will refer the product to the Australian Competition & Consumer Commission for investigation over Nanosmart's misleading claims.

By making very vague claims, marketers can continue to sell laundry balls without running afoul of customer protection laws that require veracity in advertisement.

== See also ==
- Dryer ball
- Stainless steel soap
- List of topics characterized as pseudoscience
