= Hard water =

Water that has a high mineral content

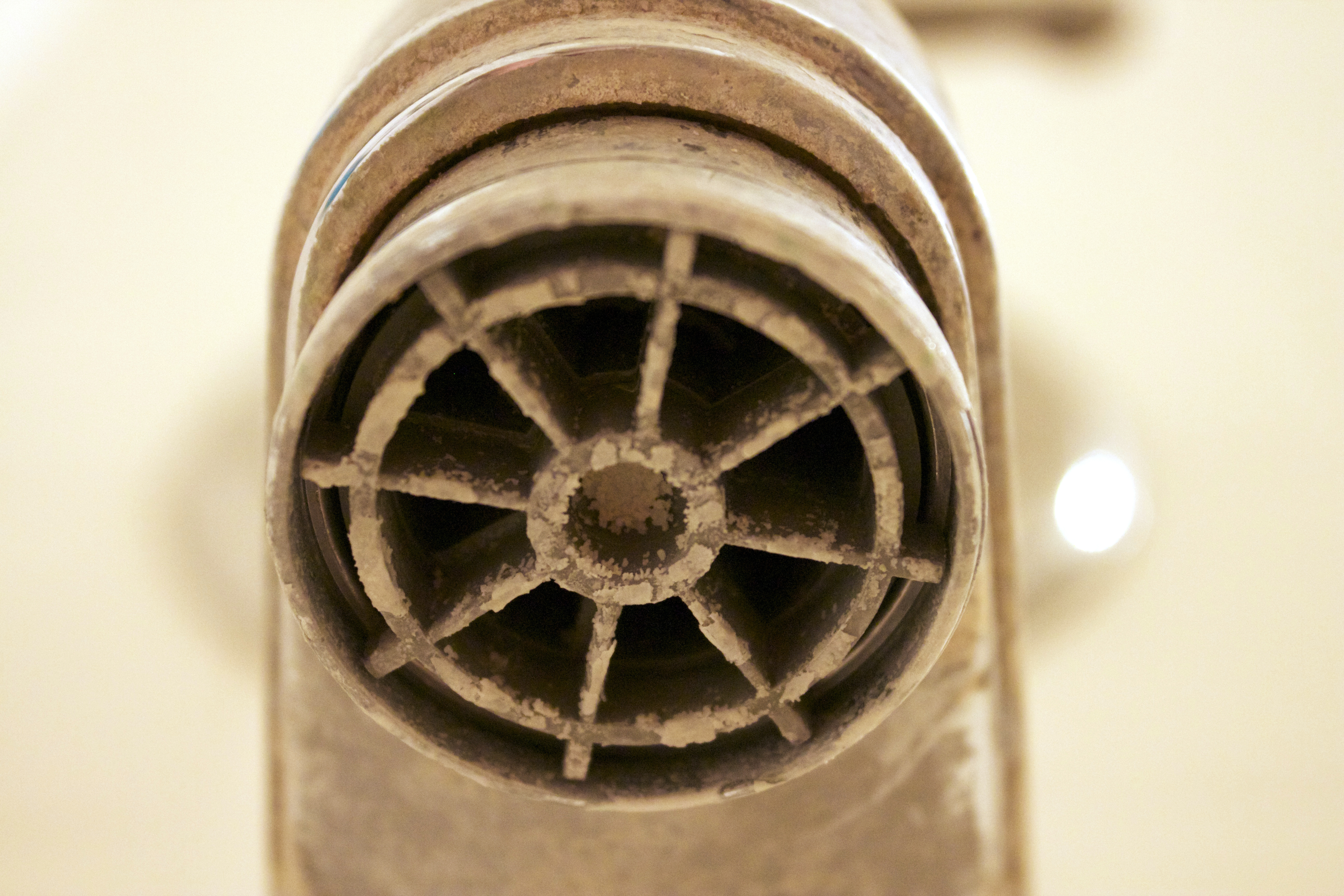
A bathtub faucet with built-up calcification from hard water in Southern Arizona

Hard water is water with a high mineral content (in contrast to "soft water"). Hard water is formed when water percolates through deposits of limestone, chalk or gypsum, which are largely made up of calcium and magnesium carbonates, bicarbonates and sulfates.

Drinking hard water may have moderate health benefits due to the mineral content. It can pose critical problems in industrial settings, where water hardness is monitored to prevent limescaling in boilers, cooling towers, and other water-handling equipment.

In domestic settings, hard water is often indicated by a lack of foam formation when soap is agitated in water, and by the formation of limescale in kettles and water heaters. Wherever water hardness is a concern, water softening is commonly used to reduce hard water's adverse effects.

== Origins ==
Natural rainwater, snow and other forms of precipitation typically have low concentrations of divalent cations such as calcium and magnesium. They may have small concentrations of ions such as sodium, chloride and sulfate derived from wind action over the sea.

Where precipitation falls in drainage basins composed of hard, impervious, and calcium-poor rocks, only very low concentrations of divalent cations are found, and the water is termed soft water. Examples include Snowdonia in Wales and the Western Highlands in Scotland.

Areas with complex geology can produce water with varying degrees of hardness over short distances.

== Types ==
=== Permanent hardness ===
The permanent hardness of water is determined by the water's concentration of cations with charges greater than or equal to 2+. Usually, the cations have a charge of 2+, i.e., they are divalent. Common cations found in hard water include Ca^{2+} and Mg^{2+}, which often enter water supplies through leaching from minerals in aquifers. They are often accompanied by traces of Fe^{2+} ions, which stain the poorly soluble carbonate deposits rust-orange after being oxidised to less soluble Fe^{3+} ions.

Common calcium-containing minerals are calcite and gypsum. A common magnesium mineral is dolomite (which also contains calcium). Rainwater and distilled water are soft, because they contain few of these ions.

The following equilibrium reaction describes the dissolving and formation of calcium carbonate and calcium bicarbonate (on the right):

CaCO_{3} (s) + CO_{2} (aq) + H_{2}O (l) ⇌ Ca^{2+} (aq) + 2 HCO^{−}_{3} (aq)

The reaction can go in either direction. Rain containing dissolved carbon dioxide can react with calcium carbonate, carrying calcium ions with it. The calcium carbonate may be redeposited as calcite as carbon dioxide is released into the atmosphere, sometimes forming stalactites and stalagmites in caves.

Calcium and magnesium ions can sometimes be removed by water softeners.

Permanent hardness (mineral content) is generally difficult to remove by boiling. If this occurs, it is usually caused by the presence of calcium sulfate/calcium chloride and/or magnesium sulfate/magnesium chloride in the water, which do not precipitate out as the temperature increases. Ions causing the permanent hardness of water can be removed using a water softener, or ion-exchange column.

=== Temporary hardness ===
Temporary hardness is caused by the presence of dissolved bicarbonate salts (calcium bicarbonate and magnesium bicarbonate). When dissolved, carbonate minerals yield calcium and magnesium cations (Ca^{2+}, Mg^{2+}), and carbonate and bicarbonate anions (CO^{2−}_{3} and HCO^{−}_{3}). The presence of these divalent alkaline earth metal cations makes the water hard.

However, unlike the permanent hardness caused by sulfate and chloride compounds, this "temporary" hardness can be reduced either by boiling the water to degas CO_{2} or by the addition of lime (calcium hydroxide) through the process of lime softening. Boiling promotes the formation of carbonate from bicarbonate, precipitating calcium carbonate from solution and leaving water softer upon cooling.

== Effects ==
With hard water, soap solutions form a white precipitate (soap scum) instead of producing lather, because the 2+ ions destroy the surfactant properties of the soap by forming a solid precipitate (the soap scum). A major component of such scum is calcium stearate, which arises from sodium stearate, the main component of soap:

2 C_{17}H_{35}COO^{−} (aq) + Ca^{2+} (aq) → (C_{17}H_{35}COO)_{2}Ca (s)

Hardness can thus be defined as the soap-consuming capacity of a water sample, or the capacity to precipitate soap, a characteristic property of water that prevents lathering. Synthetic detergents do not form such scums.

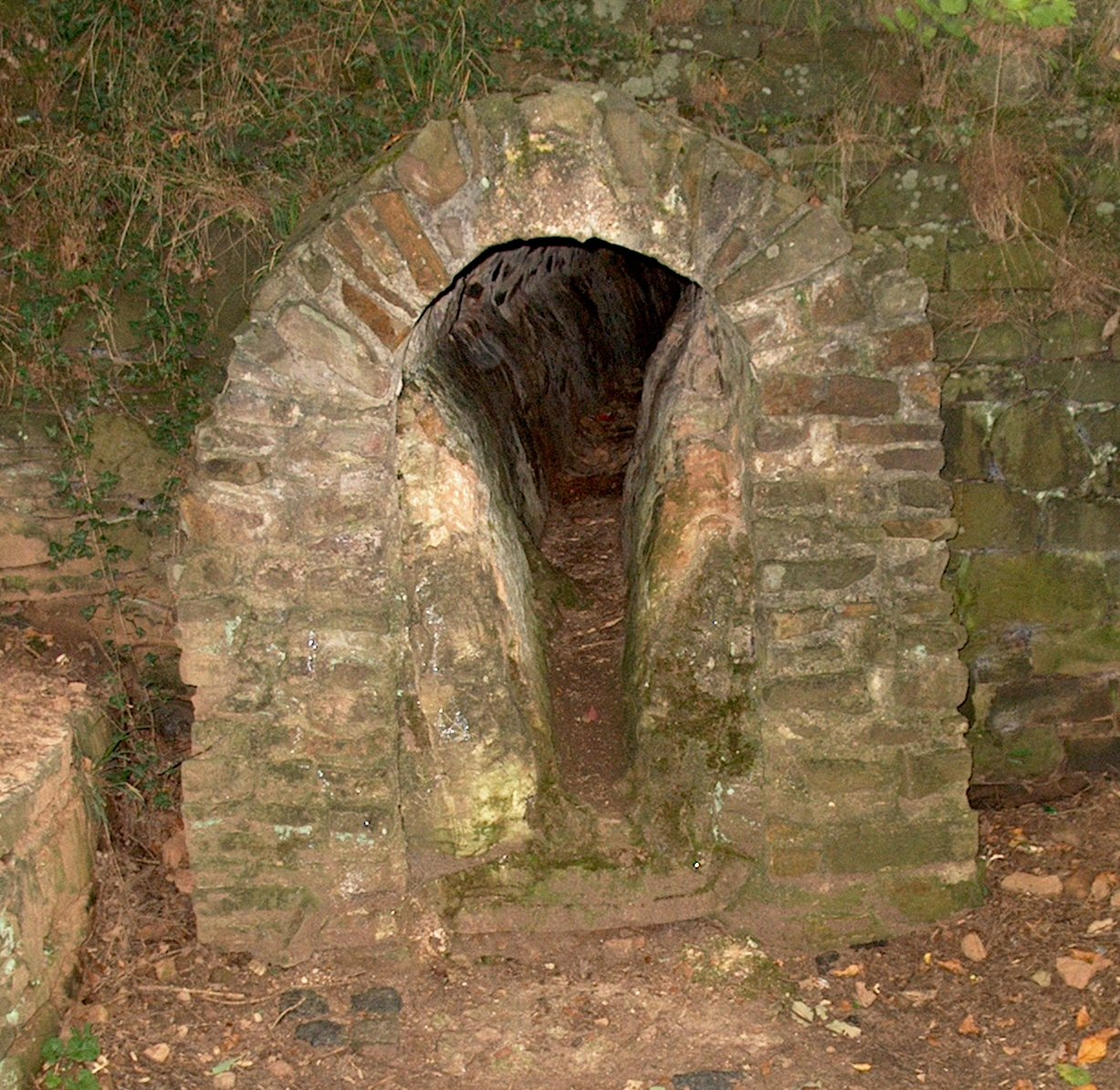
A portion of the ancient Roman Eifel Aqueduct in Germany. After being in service for about 180 years, the aqueduct had mineral deposits of up to 20 cm (8 in) thick along the walls.

Because soft water contains fewer calcium ions, there is no inhibition of the lathering action of soaps, and no soap scum forms during normal washing. Similarly, soft water produces no calcium deposits in water heating systems.

Hard water also forms deposits that clog plumbing. These deposits, called "scale", are composed mainly of calcium carbonate (CaCO_{3}), magnesium hydroxide (Mg(OH)_{2}), and calcium sulfate (CaSO_{4}). Calcium and magnesium carbonates tend to be deposited as off-white solids on the inside surfaces of pipes and heat exchangers.

This precipitation (formation of an insoluble solid) is primarily caused by the thermal decomposition of bicarbonate ions, but it also occurs when the carbonate ion is at saturation concentration. The resulting build-up of scale restricts the flow of water in pipes. In boilers, deposits impair heat transfer to the water, reducing heating efficiency and allowing metal boiler components to overheat.

In a pressurized system, this overheating can lead to the failure of the boiler. The damage caused by calcium carbonate deposits varies according to the crystalline form, for example, calcite or aragonite.

The presence of ions in an electrolyte, in this case, hard water, can also lead to galvanic corrosion, in which one metal will preferentially corrode when in contact with another type of metal when both are in contact with an electrolyte. The softening of hard water by ion exchange does not increase its corrosivity per se. Similarly, where lead plumbing is in use, softened water does not substantially increase plumbo-solvency.

In swimming pools, hard water is manifested by a turbid, or cloudy (milky), appearance to the water. Calcium and magnesium hydroxides are both soluble in water. The solubility of the hydroxides of the alkaline-earth metals to which calcium and magnesium belong (group 2 of the periodic table) increases moving down the column. Aqueous solutions of these metal hydroxides absorb carbon dioxide from the air, forming insoluble carbonates, and giving rise to turbidity. This often results from the pH being excessively high (pH > 7.6). Hence, a common solution to the problem is, while maintaining the chlorine concentration at the proper level, to lower the pH by the addition of hydrochloric acid, the optimum value is in the range of 7.2 to 7.6.

=== Softening ===
In some cases it is desirable to soften hard water. Most detergents contain ingredients that counteract the effects of hard water on the surfactants. For this reason, water softening is often unnecessary. Where softening is practised, it is often recommended to soften only the water sent to domestic hot water systems to prevent or delay inefficiencies and damage due to scale formation in water heaters.

A common method for water softening involves the use of ion-exchange resins, which replace ions like Ca^{2+} by twice the number of mono cations such as sodium or potassium ions.

Washing soda (sodium carbonate, Na_{2}CO_{3}) is easily obtained and has long been used as a water softener for domestic laundry, in conjunction with the usual soap or detergent.

Water that has been treated by a water softening may be termed softened water. In these cases, the water may also contain elevated levels of sodium or potassium and bicarbonate or chloride ions.

=== Health considerations ===
The World Health Organization says that "there does not appear to be any convincing evidence that water hardness causes adverse health effects in humans". In fact, the United States National Research Council has found that hard water serves as a dietary supplement for calcium and magnesium.

Some studies have shown a weak inverse relationship between water hardness and cardiovascular disease in men, up to a level of 170 mg calcium carbonate per litre of water. The World Health Organization has reviewed the evidence and concluded the data was inadequate to recommend a level of hardness.

Recommendations have been made for the minimum and maximum levels of calcium (40–80 ppm) and magnesium (20–30 ppm) in drinking water, and a total hardness expressed as the sum of the calcium and magnesium concentrations of 2–4 mmol/L.

Other studies have shown weak correlations between cardiovascular health and water hardness.

The prevalence of atopic dermatitis (eczema) in children may be increased by hard drinking water. Living in areas with hard water may also play a part in the development of AD in early life. However, when AD is already established, using water softeners at home does not reduce the severity of the symptoms.

== Measurement ==
Hardness can be quantified by instrumental analysis. The total water hardness is the sum of the molar concentrations of Ca^{2+} and Mg^{2+}, in mol/L or mmol/L units. Although water hardness usually measures only the total concentrations of calcium and magnesium (the two most prevalent divalent metal ions), iron, aluminium, and manganese are also present at elevated levels in some locations.

The presence of iron characteristically confers a brownish (rust-like) colour to the calcification, instead of white (the colour of most of the other compounds).

Water hardness is often not expressed as a molar concentration, but rather in various units, such as degrees of general hardness (dGH), German degrees (°dH), parts per million (ppm, mg/L, or American degrees), grains per gallon (gpg), English degrees (°e, e, or °Clark), or French degrees (°fH, °f or °HF; lowercase f is used to prevent confusion with degrees Fahrenheit). The table below shows conversion factors between the various units.

Hardness unit conversion
	1 mmol/L	1 ppm, mg/L	1 dGH, °dH	1 gpg	1 °e, °Clark	1 °fH
mmol/L	1	0.009991	0.1783	0.171	0.1424	0.09991
ppm, mg/L	100.1	1	17.85	17.12	14.25	10
dGH, °dH	5.608	0.05603	1	0.9591	0.7986	0.5603
gpg	5.847	0.05842	1.043	1	0.8327	0.5842
°e, °Clark	7.022	0.07016	1.252	1.201	1	0.7016
°fH	10.01	0.1	1.785	1.712	1.425	1

The various alternative units represent an equivalent mass of calcium oxide (CaO) or calcium carbonate (CaCO_{3}) that, when dissolved in a unit volume of pure water, would result in the same total molar concentration of Mg^{2+} and Ca^{2+}. The different conversion factors arise from the fact that equivalent masses of calcium oxide and calcium carbonates differ and that different mass and volume units are used. The units are as follows:

- Parts per million (ppm) is usually defined as 1 mg/L CaCO_{3} (the definition used below). It is equivalent to mg/L without chemical compound specified, and to American degree.
- Grain per gallon (gpg) is defined as 1 grain (64.8 mg) of calcium carbonate per U.S. gallon (3.79 litres), or 17.118 ppm.
- 1 mmol/L is equivalent to 100.09 mg/L CaCO_{3} or 40.08 mg/L Ca^{2+}.
- A degree of General Hardness (dGH or 'German degree' (°dH, deutsche Härte)) is defined as 10 mg/L CaO or 17.848 ppm.
- A Clark degree (°Clark) or English degree (°e or e) is defined as one grain (64.8 mg) of CaCO_{3} per Imperial gallon (4.55 litres) of water, equivalent to 14.254 ppm.
- A French degree (°fH or °f) is defined as 10 mg/L CaCO_{3}, equivalent to 10 ppm.

=== Hard/soft classification ===
As it is the precise mixture of minerals dissolved in the water, together with water's pH and temperature, that determine the behaviour of the hardness, a single-number scale does not adequately describe hardness. However, the United States Geological Survey uses the following classification for hard and soft water:

Classification	mg-CaCO_{3}/L (ppm)	mmol/L	dGH/°dH	gpg
Soft	0–60	0–0.60	0–3.37	0–3.50
Moderately hard	61–120	0.61–1.20	3.38–6.74	3.56–7.01
Hard	121–180	1.21–1.80	6.75–10.11	7.06–10.51
Very hard	≥ 181	≥ 1.81	≥ 10.12	≥ 10.57

Seawater is considered to be very hard due to various dissolved salts. Typically seawater's hardness is in the area of 6,570 ppm (6.57 grams per litre). In contrast, fresh water has a hardness in the range of 15 to 375 ppm, generally around 60 ppm.

=== Indices ===
Several indices are used to describe the behaviour of calcium carbonate in water, oil, or gas mixtures.

==== Langelier saturation index (LSI) ====
The Langelier saturation index (sometimes Langelier stability index) is a calculated number used to predict the calcium carbonate stability of water. It indicates whether the water will precipitate, dissolve, or be in equilibrium with calcium carbonate. In 1936, Wilfred Langelier developed a method for predicting the pH at which water is saturated in calcium carbonate (called pH_{s}). The LSI is expressed as the difference between the actual system pH and the saturation pH_{s}:

LSI = pH (measured) − pH_{s}
- For LSI > 0, water is supersaturated and tends to precipitate a scale layer of CaCO_{3}.
- For LSI = 0, water is saturated (in equilibrium) with CaCO_{3}. A scale layer of CaCO_{3} is neither precipitated nor dissolved.
- For LSI < 0, water is under-saturated and tends to dissolve solid CaCO_{3}.

If the actual pH of the water is below the calculated saturation pH_{s}, the LSI is negative and the water has a very limited scaling potential. If the actual pH exceeds pHs, the LSI is positive, and being supersaturated with CaCO_{3}, the water tends to form scale. At increasing positive index values, the scaling potential increases.

In practice, water with an LSI between −0.5 and +0.5 will not display enhanced mineral dissolving or scale-forming properties. Water with an LSI below −0.5 tends to exhibit noticeably increased dissolving abilities while water with an LSI above +0.5 tends to exhibit noticeably increased scale-forming properties.

The LSI is temperature-sensitive. The LSI becomes more positive as the water temperature increases. This has particular implications in situations where well water is used.

The temperature of the water when it first exits the well is often significantly lower than the temperature inside the building served by the well or at the laboratory where the LSI measurement is made. This increase in temperature can cause scaling, especially in cases such as water heaters. Conversely, systems that reduce water temperature will have less scaling.

- Water analysis:
  - pH = 7.5
  - TDS = 320 mg/L
  - Calcium = 150 mg/L (or ppm) as CaCO_{3}
  - Alkalinity = 34 mg/L (or ppm) as CaCO_{3}
- LSI formula:
  - LSI = pH − pH_{s}
  - pH_{s} = (9.3 + A + B) − (C + D) where:
    - °C = Temperature in degrees centigrade
    - A = (log_{10}[TDS] − 1)/10 = 0.15
    - B = −13.12 × log_{10}(°C + 273) + 34.55 = 2.09 at 25 °C and 1.09 at 82 °C
    - C = log_{10}[Ca^{2+} as CaCO_{3}] – 0.4 = 1.78
      - (Ca^{2+} as CaCO_{3} is also called calcium hardness, and is calculated as 2.5[Ca^{2+}])
    - D = log_{10}[alkalinity as CaCO_{3}] = 1.53

==== Ryznar stability index (RSI) ====
The Ryznar stability index (RSI) uses a database of scale thickness measurements in municipal water systems to predict the effect of water chemistry. It was developed from empirical observations of corrosion rates and film formation in steel mains.

This index is defined as:

RSI = 2 pH_{s} – pH (measured)
- For 6.5 < RSI < 7 water is considered to be approximately at saturation equilibrium with calcium carbonate
- For RSI > 8 water is undersaturated and, therefore, would tend to dissolve any existing solid CaCO_{3}
- For RSI < 6.5 water tends to be scale form

==== Puckorius scaling index (PSI) ====
The Puckorius scaling index (PSI) uses slightly different parameters to quantify the relationship between the saturation state of the water and the amount of limescale deposited.

==== Other indices ====
Other indices include the Larson-Skold Index, the Stiff-Davis Index, and the Oddo-Tomson Index.

== Regional information ==
The hardness of local water supplies depends on the source of water. Water in streams flowing over volcanic (igneous) rocks will be soft, while water from boreholes drilled into porous rock is normally very hard.

=== Australia ===
Analysis of water hardness in major Australian cities by the Australian Water Association shows a range from very soft (Melbourne) to hard (Adelaide). Total hardness levels of calcium carbonate in ppm are:

- Canberra: 40
- Melbourne: 10–26
- Sydney: 39.4–60.1
- Perth: 29–226
- Brisbane: 100
- Adelaide: 134–148
- Hobart: 5.8–34.4
- Darwin: 31

=== Canada ===
Prairie provinces (mainly Saskatchewan and Manitoba) contain high quantities of calcium and magnesium, often as dolomite, which are readily soluble in the groundwater that contains high concentrations of trapped carbon dioxide from the last glaciation.

In these parts of Canada, the total hardness in ppm of calcium carbonate equivalent frequently exceeds 200 ppm, if groundwater is the only source of potable water. The west coast, by contrast, has unusually soft water, derived mainly from mountain lakes fed by glaciers and snowmelt.

Some typical values are:

- Montreal, Quebec: 116 ppm
- Calgary, Alberta: 165 ppm
- Regina, Saskatchewan: 496 ppm
- Saskatoon, Saskatchewan: 160–180 ppm
- Winnipeg, Manitoba: 77 ppm
- Toronto, Ontario: 121 ppm
- Vancouver, British Columbia: < 3 ppm
- Charlottetown, Prince Edward Island: 140–150 ppm
- Waterloo Region, Ontario: 400 ppm
- Guelph, Ontario: 460 ppm
- Saint John (West), New Brunswick: 160–200 ppm
- Ottawa, Ontario: 30 ppm

=== England and Wales ===
Hardness water level of major cities in England and Wales
Area	Primary source	Level
Manchester	Lake District (Haweswater, Thirlmere) Pennines (Longdendale Chain)	1.750 °Clark / 25 ppm
Birmingham	Elan Valley Reservoirs	3 °Clark / 42.8 ppm
Bristol	Mendip Hills (Bristol Reservoirs)	16 °Clark / 228.5 ppm
Southampton	Bewl Water	18.76 °Clark / 268 ppm
London (EC1A)	Lee Valley Reservoir Chain	19.3 °Clark / 275 ppm
Wrexham (LL11)	Hafren Dyfrdwy	4.77 °Clark

Information from the Drinking Water Inspectorate shows that drinking water in England is generally considered to be 'very hard', with most areas of England, particularly east of a line between the Severn and Tees estuaries, exhibiting above 200 ppm for the calcium carbonate equivalent.

Water in London, for example, is mostly obtained from the River Thames and River Lea, both of which derive a significant proportion of their dry weather flow from springs in limestone and chalk aquifers. Wales, Devon, Cornwall, and parts of northwest England are softer water areas and range from 0 to 200 ppm. In the brewing industry in England and Wales, water is often deliberately hardened with gypsum in the process of Burtonisation.

Generally, water is mostly hard in urban areas of England where soft water sources are unavailable. Several cities built water supply sources in the 18th century as the Industrial Revolution and urban population burgeoned.

Manchester was a notable such city in North West England and its wealthy corporation built several reservoirs at Thirlmere and Haweswater in the Lake District to the north. There is no exposure to limestone or chalk in their headwaters and consequently the water in Manchester is rated as 'very soft'. Similarly, tap water in Birmingham is also soft as it is sourced from the Elan Valley Reservoirs in Wales, even though groundwater in the area is hard.

=== Ireland ===
The EPA has published a standards handbook for the interpretation of water quality in Ireland in which definitions of water hardness are given. Section 36 discusses hardness. Reference to original EU documentation is given, which sets out no limit for hardness. The handbook also gives no "Recommended or Mandatory Limit Values" for hardness.

The handbook does indicate that above the midpoint of the ranges defined as "Moderately Hard", effects are seen increasingly: "The chief disadvantages of hard waters are that they neutralise the lathering power of soap [...] and, more important, that they can cause blockage of pipes and severely reduced boiler efficiency because of scale formation. These effects will increase as the hardness rises to and beyond 200 mg/L CaCO_{3}."

=== Netherlands ===
In the Netherlands, the legal minimum hardness for drinking water is 1 mmol/l.

Examples of measurements from the water suppliers in the metropolitan area (Randstad) are around 1.42 mmol/l (7.9 DH or 141 ppm) from Dunea, or between 5 and 11 DH (95 to 200 ppm) from Vitens. According to the terms given above, this could be interpreted as varying from "Moderately hard" to "Hard".

=== South Africa ===
South Africa comprehensively tracks the quality of its water supply, and metropolitan municipalities conduct regular testing at water supply sites. The country has published guidelines on water quality for domestic, recreational, industrial, irrigation, livestock, aquacultural, and aquatic uses.

South Africa spans 1,221,037 square kilometers and its geography varies greatly. The country has certain regions with very soft water, and some with very hard water. This variance occurs even within its major cities, with water hardness varying quite significantly between suburbs or city regions.

Water hardness data for some of South Africa's metro areas, including its 3 largest cities by population (Cape Town, Johannesburg, and Durban), can be found in the table below.

South African Water Hardness Data
City	Municipality	Province	Supply Location / Provider	Water Hardness (ppm)	Category	Reference
Cape Town	City of Cape Town	Western Cape	Constantia Nek (Southern Suburbs)	44	Soft	2019
Cape Town	City of Cape Town	Western Cape	Kloof Nek (City Bowl)	60	Soft to Moderate	2019
Cape Town	City of Cape Town	Western Cape	Witzandz (West Coast)	126	Hard	2019
Cape Town	City of Cape Town	Western Cape	Brooklands (False Bay)	217	Very Hard	2019
Durban	eThekwini	KwaZulu-Natal	Harris	36	Soft	2020
Durban	eThekwini	KwaZulu-Natal	Durban Heights	42	Soft	2020
Durban	eThekwini	KwaZulu-Natal	Amanzimtoti	51	Soft	2020
Durban	eThekwini	KwaZulu-Natal	Mzinto	70	Moderate	2020
Johannesburg	City of Johannesburg	Gauteng	Rand Water	80	Moderate	2022
Pretoria	City of Tshwane	Gauteng	Rand Water	80	Moderate	2022

=== United States ===
A collection of data from the United States found that about half the water stations tested had hardness over 120 mg per liter of calcium carbonate equivalent, placing them in the categories "hard" or "very hard". The other half were classified as soft or moderately hard. More than 85% of American homes have hard water.

The softest waters occur in parts of the New England, South Atlantic–Gulf, Pacific Northwest, and Hawaii regions. Moderately hard waters are common in many of the rivers of the Tennessee, Great Lakes, and Alaska regions. Hard and very hard waters are found in some of the streams in most of the regions throughout the country. The hardest waters (greater than 1,000 ppm) are in streams in Texas, New Mexico, Kansas, Arizona, Utah, parts of Colorado, southern Nevada, and southern California.

== See also ==
- Fouling – Accumulation of unwanted material on solid surfaces
- Grain (unit) – Unit of mass
- Water purification – Process of removing impurities from water
- Water quality – Assessment against standards for use
- Water treatment – Process that improves the quality of water
