= Negative air ionization therapy =

Pseudoscientific medical treatment

Negative air ionization therapy (NAIs) uses air ionisers as a non-pharmaceutical treatment for respiratory disease, allergy, or stress-related health conditions. The mainstream scientific community considers many applications of NAIs to be pseudoscience. Many negative ion products release ozone, a chemical known to cause lung damage.

== Research ==
For seasonal affective disorder (SAD), a randomized controlled trial (RCT) comparing high (4.5 × 10^{14} ions/second) and low (1.7 × 10^{11} ions/second) flow rate negative air ionization with bright light therapy found that the post-treatment improvement percentage was 57.1% for bright light, 47.9% for high-density ions and 22.7% for low-density ions. An older RCT conducted by the same authors also found air ionization effective for SAD. A 2007 review considers this therapy "under investigation" and suggests that it may be a helpful treatment for SAD.

An RCT comparing the short-term effects of bright light, an auditory stimulus, and high and low-density negative ions on mood and alertness in mildly depressed and non-depressed adults found that the three first (active) stimuli, but not the low-density placebo, reduced depression on the Beck Depression Inventory scale. The auditory stimulus, bright light, and high-density ions all produced rapid mood changes - with small to medium effect sizes - in depressed and non-depressed subjects.

Researchers have continued to cite a dearth of evidence about the effects of negative air ionization. "The presence of NAIs is credited for increasing psychological health, productivity, and overall well-being but without consistent or reliable evidence in therapeutic effects and with controversy in anti-microorganisms," researchers wrote in a 2018 article published in the International Journal of Molecular Sciences.

== See also ==
- Topics characterized as pseudoscience
- Ionized bracelet
- Earthing therapy
- Water ionizer
