= Water softening =

Removing positive ions from hard water

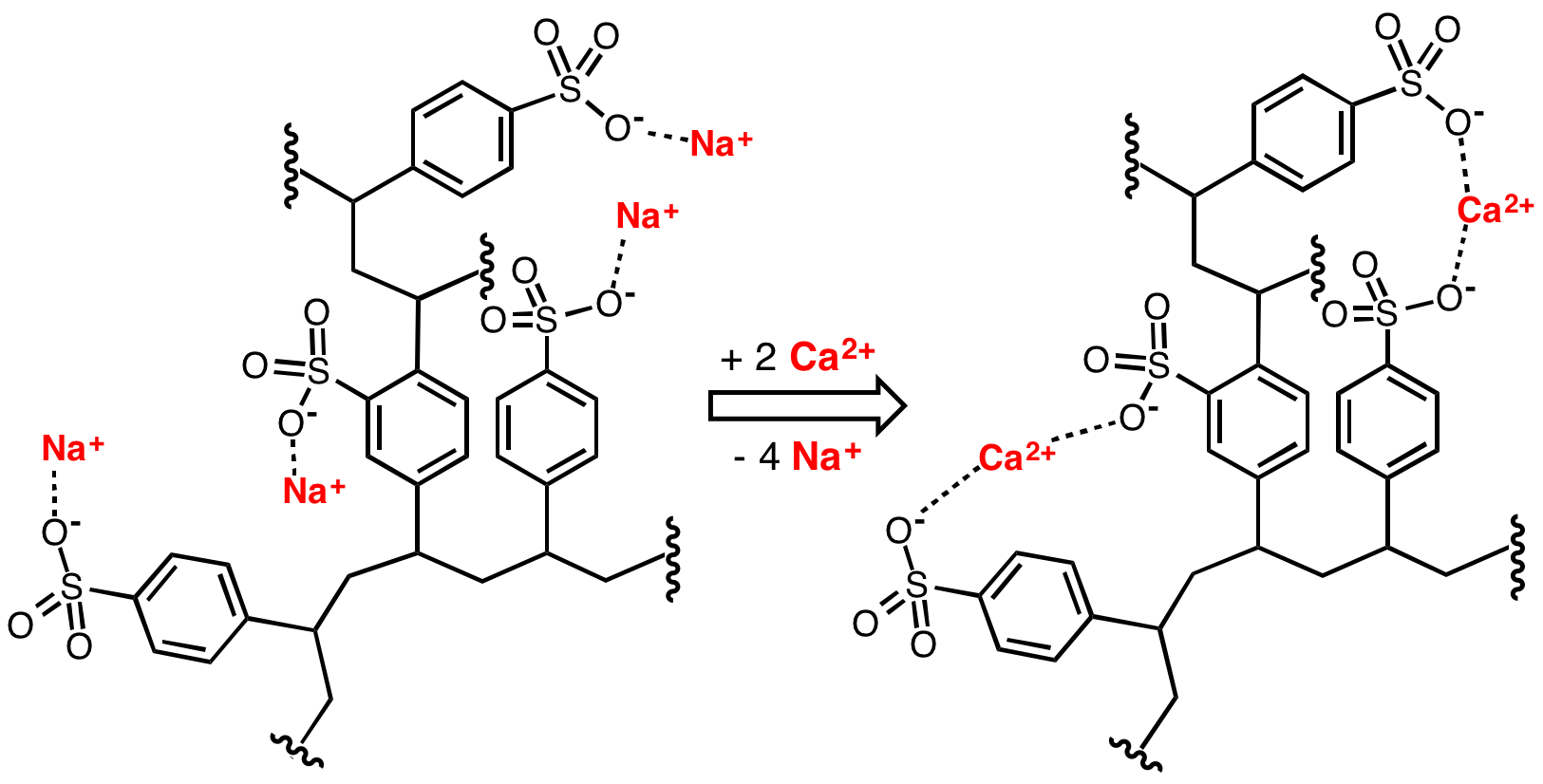
Idealized image of cation-exchange resin performing water softening. It shows sodium ions being released by the resin, and replaced with calcium ions captured from water.

Water softening is the removal of calcium, magnesium, and a small number of other metal cations in hard water. The resulting soft water requires less soap for the same cleaning effort, as soap is not wasted bonding with calcium ions. Soft water also extends the lifetime of plumbing by reducing or eliminating scale build-up in pipes and fittings. Water softening is usually achieved using lime softening or ion-exchange resins, but is increasingly being accomplished using nanofiltration or reverse osmosis membranes.

== Rationale ==
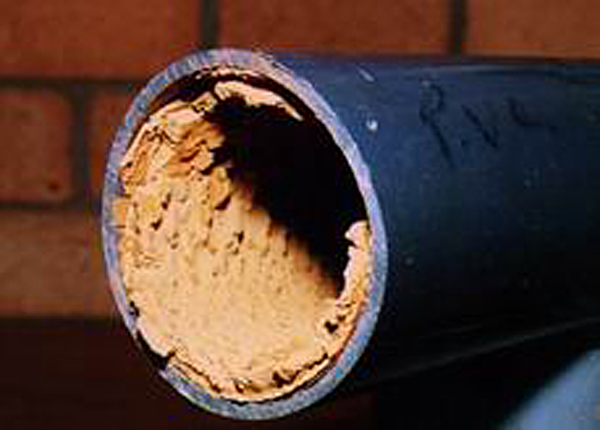
Limescale buildup in a PVC pipe

The presence of certain metal ions like calcium and magnesium, principally as bicarbonates, chlorides, and sulfates, in water causes a variety of problems. Hard water leads to the buildup of limescale, which can foul plumbing, and promote galvanic corrosion. In industrial scale water softening plants, the effluent flow from the re-generation process can precipitate scale that can interfere with sewage systems.

The slippery feeling associated with washing in soft water is caused by the weaker attraction of the soap to the water ions when the water has been stripped of its mineral content. The surface of human skin has a light charge that the soap tends to bind with, requiring more effort and a greater volume of water to remove. Calcium and magnesium ions in hard water reacts with soap, forming insoluble stearates, commonly called soap scum or soap curd.

== Methods ==
The most common means for removing water hardness rely on ion-exchange resin or reverse osmosis. Other approaches include precipitation methods, such as fluidized bed pellet softening, and sequestration by the addition of chelating agents. Distillation and reverse osmosis are the most widely used two non-chemical methods of water softening.

=== Ion-exchange resin method ===
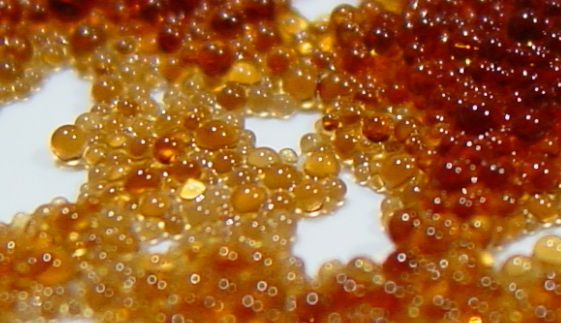
Ion exchange resins, in the form of beads, are a functional component of domestic water softening units

Conventional water-softening appliances intended for household use depend on an ion-exchange resin in which "hardness ions"—mainly Ca^{2+} and Mg^{2+}—are exchanged for sodium ions. As described by NSF/ANSI Standard 44, ion-exchange devices reduce the hardness by replacing calcium and magnesium (Ca^{2+} and Mg^{2+}) with sodium or potassium ions (Na^{+} and K^{+})."

Ion-exchange resins are organic polymers containing anionic functional groups to which the divalent cations (Ca^{2+} and Mg^{2+}) bind more strongly than monovalent cations (Na^{+} and K^{+}). Inorganic materials called zeolites also exhibit ion-exchange properties. These minerals are widely used in laundry detergents. Resins are also available to remove the carbonate, bicarbonate, and sulfate ions that are absorbed and hydroxide ions that are released from the resin.

When all the available Na^{+} ions have been replaced with calcium or magnesium ions, the resin must be recharged by eluting the Ca^{2+} and Mg^{2+} ions using a solution of sodium chloride or sodium hydroxide, depending on the type of resin used. For anionic resins, regeneration typically uses a solution of sodium hydroxide (lye) or potassium hydroxide. The waste waters eluted from the ion-exchange column containing the unwanted calcium and magnesium salts are typically discharged to the sewage system.

Recharge typically takes the following steps:

- Backwash: Water is directed through the resin in the direction opposite to that of normal flow, and the output is sent to a drain for disposal. This process flushes out solids, and expands the resin bed.
- Brine draw: Water is directed through a jet pump, which pulls salt water from the brine tank, before the water and brine pass through the resin bed in the normal direction, if co-current, or in the reverse direction, if counter-current. The output of this process is also discarded through the drain hose.
- Rinse: Brine draw stops, but water continues to flow from the inlet to the outlet, gradually flushing the brine out of the resin bed. The flushing water flows slowly for several minutes, then at a faster rate for as long as an hour. At some point, the brine reservoir is refilled with fresh water.

=== Lime softening ===
Lime softening is the process in which lime is added to hard water to make it softer. It has several advantages over the ion-exchange method: silica, alkalinity levels, and suspended matter can also be reduced or are removed, and operational costs can be lower, but is mainly suited to commercial treatment applications because it has a higher capital cost and usually requires trained staff.

=== Chelating agents ===
Chelators are used in chemical analysis, as water softeners, and are ingredients in many commercial products such as shampoos and food preservatives. Citric acid is used to soften water in soaps, personal care products and laundry detergents. A commonly used synthetic chelator is ethylenediaminetetraacetic acid (EDTA), which may exist as a tetrasodium or disodium salt. Due to environmental and aquatic toxicity concerns regarding widespread use of EDTA in household and personal care products, alternatives such as sodium phytate/phytic acid, tetrasodium glutamate diacetate and trisodium ethylenediamine disuccinate are finding more prevalent usage.

=== Washing soda method ===
In this method, water is treated with a calculated amount of washing soda (Na_{2}CO_{3}), which converts the chlorides and sulfates of calcium and magnesium into their respective carbonates, which get precipitated.

CaCl_{2} + Na_{2}CO_{3} → CaCO_{3} + 2NaCl

MgSO_{4} + Na_{2}CO_{3} → MgCO_{3} + Na_{2}SO_{4}

=== Distillation and rain water ===
Since Ca^{2+} and Mg^{2+} exist as nonvolatile salts, they can be removed by distilling the water. Distillation is expensive and energy-inefficient compared to other methods of water softening. Rainwater is soft because it is naturally distilled during the water cycle of evaporation, condensation and precipitation.

=== Reverse osmosis ===
Reverse osmosis uses an applied pressure gradient across a semipermeable membrane to overcome osmotic pressure and remove water molecules from the solution with hardness ions. The membrane has pores large enough to admit water molecules for passage; hardness ions such as Ca^{2+} and Mg^{2+} will not fit through the pores. The resulting soft water supply is free of hardness ions without any other ions being added. Membranes are a type of water filter requiring regular cleaning or replacement maintenance.

==== Nanofiltration ====
Nanofiltration is a process similar to reverse osmosis in that it involves the use of a semipermeable membrane, though the filter membrane is distinct in that its pores are ≤ 10 nanometers in diameter. The process is often used in conjunction with reverse osmosis filtration, as nanofiltration on its own is not as effective and more expensive than chemical water treatment methods.

== Physical water treatment ==
Removing or replacing minerals in hard water is called water softening. An alternative water treatment is called water conditioning, in which minerals remain in the water, but are altered so they do not form scale. Although the United States has standards for measuring the minerals in water, it does not have standards for measuring scale forming ability of water. Instead, US researchers use the German DVGW-W512 protocol.

Conditioning of hard water from Tempe, Arizona with different types of treatment methods
Treatment	Normalized scale formation
No treatment	1.00
Electromagnetic Water Treatment	0.57
Electrically Induced Precipitation	0.50
Capacitive Deionization	0.17
Ion exchange	0.06
Template Assisted Crystallization	0.04

=== Electrical water treatment ===
Some manufacturers claim that the electrical devices they produce can affect the interaction of minerals with water so that the minerals do not bind to surfaces. Since these systems do not work by exchanging ions, like traditional water softeners do, one benefit claimed for the user is the elimination of the need to add salt to the system. Such systems do not remove minerals from the water itself. Rather, they can only alter the downstream effects that the mineral-bearing water would otherwise have. These systems do not fall within the term "water softening" but rather "water conditioning".

Electrical precipitation devices cause microscopic mineral crystals to form and remain suspended as they flow with the water, while also acting as seeds for further crystal growth. As water is heated, minerals will crystallize on these seeds, instead of the plumbing system. The dissolved minerals become insoluble solid particles in suspension, passing through the system without binding to plumbing surfaces.

=== Magnetic water treatment ===
Claims for magnetic water treatment are not considered to be valid. For instance, no reduction of scale formation was found when such a magnet device was scientifically tested.

=== Template assisted crystallization ===
Cold hard water passes through a tank containing tiny polymeric beads with surfaces that allow nucleation of tiny bubbles of carbon dioxide gas. The initial nucleation of the gas bubbles can occur due to depressurization of the hard water as it flows up a water well just like when the top comes off of a beer bottle. Once carbon dioxide leaves the liquid a chemical reaction immediately drives formation of calcium carbonate crystals on the surface of the bubbles. As crystals grow on these seeds they break off in the flow while still of microscopic size. If these tiny particles travel through a water heater, further exsolution of carbon dioxide occurs due to increased temperature and new crystal growth occurs on the particles, rather than on the water heater. Once calcite occurs in the water, new calcite will prefer to form on the old calcite due to the available bonds on the crystals and the proximity and number of calcite surfaces in the water.

This process is either called template assisted crystallization (TAC) or nucleation assisted crystallization (NAC). The polymeric beads are polyphosphates ranging in size from 0.5 to 2.0 μm. and some have a ceramic coating. Testing at the University of Arizona found TAC to be the most effective at reducing scale formation, followed closely by ion exchange (see chart above). They are more effective than approaches that attempt to sequester ions through application of magnetic or electric fields. The advantages of TAC tanks include simplicity, low maintenance, lack of toxic effluent (like chlorine), and the availability of calcium as a nutrient in drinking water. The disadvantages include that the calcite crystals are not avoided or removed from the water such that areas where water evaporates will still show deposits. It is claimed by manufacturers that these deposits are easier to clean since the calcite forms on seed crystals instead of on the surfaces.

== Health effects ==
The UK's National Health Service recommends a maximum salt intake of 6g, against an actual current intake of 8.1g. The US CDC recommends limiting daily total sodium intake to 2,300 mg per day, though the average US American consumes 3,500 mg per day. Because the amount of sodium present in drinking water—even after softening—does not represent a significant percentage of a person's daily sodium intake, the US EPA considers sodium in drinking water to be unlikely to cause adverse health effects.

A study found the mean concentration of sodium in softened water to be 278 mg/L. In 2 liters of water—the amount of drinking water typically suggested for an average adult, this constitutes about 22% of the recommended sodium intake by the US CDC and may make a difference to those who need to significantly limit their sodium consumption. For those who are on sodium-restricted diets, the use of a reverse osmosis system for drinking water and cooking water will remove sodium along with any other impurities that may be present. Potassium chloride can also be used as a regenerant instead of sodium chloride, although it is more costly. For people with impaired kidney function, however, elevated potassium levels, or hyperkalemia, can lead to complications such as cardiac arrest. However, it is unlikely that consuming water treated with potassium chloride will lead to adverse health effects.

High levels of water hardness in the home may also be linked to the development of atopic dermatitis (eczema) early in life, although the actual relationship is correlational at the present and further research is indicated to establish a causal one. However, using water softeners when atopic dermatitis is already established does not reduce the severity of the symptoms.

== Environmental impact ==
Softened water (measured as residual sodium carbonate index) in which calcium and magnesium have been partly replaced by sodium is not suitable for irrigation use, as it tends to cause the development of alkali soils. Non-chemical devices are often used in place of traditional water softening for this application.

== See also ==
- Desalination
- Ion exchange
- Lime softening
- Magnetic water treatment
- Purified water
- Water purification
