= Air ioniser =

Electrical device to ionise air molecules

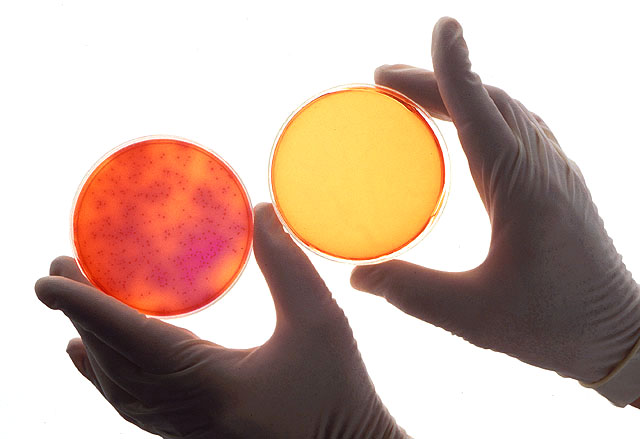
This photo shows the sterilisation effects of negative air ionization on a chamber injected with aerosolised Salmonella enteritidis. The left sample is untreated; the right, treated.

An air ioniser (or negative ion generator or Chizhevsky's chandelier) is a device that uses high voltage to ionise (electrically charge) air molecules. Negative ions, or anions, are particles with one or more extra electrons, conferring a net negative charge to the particle. Cations are positive ions missing one or more electrons, resulting in a net positive charge. Some commercial air purifiers are designed to generate negative ions. Another type of air ioniser is the electrostatic discharge (ESD) ioniser (balanced ion generator) used to neutralise static charge.

== History ==
In 1918 Alexander Chizhevsky created the first air ioniser for ion therapy. It was originally used for animal health in agriculture. This discovery ignited Cecil Alfred "Coppy" Laws' interest in the phenomenon of air ionisation. Laws has been credited with being the inventor of the domestic air ioniser.

== Ionic air purifiers ==
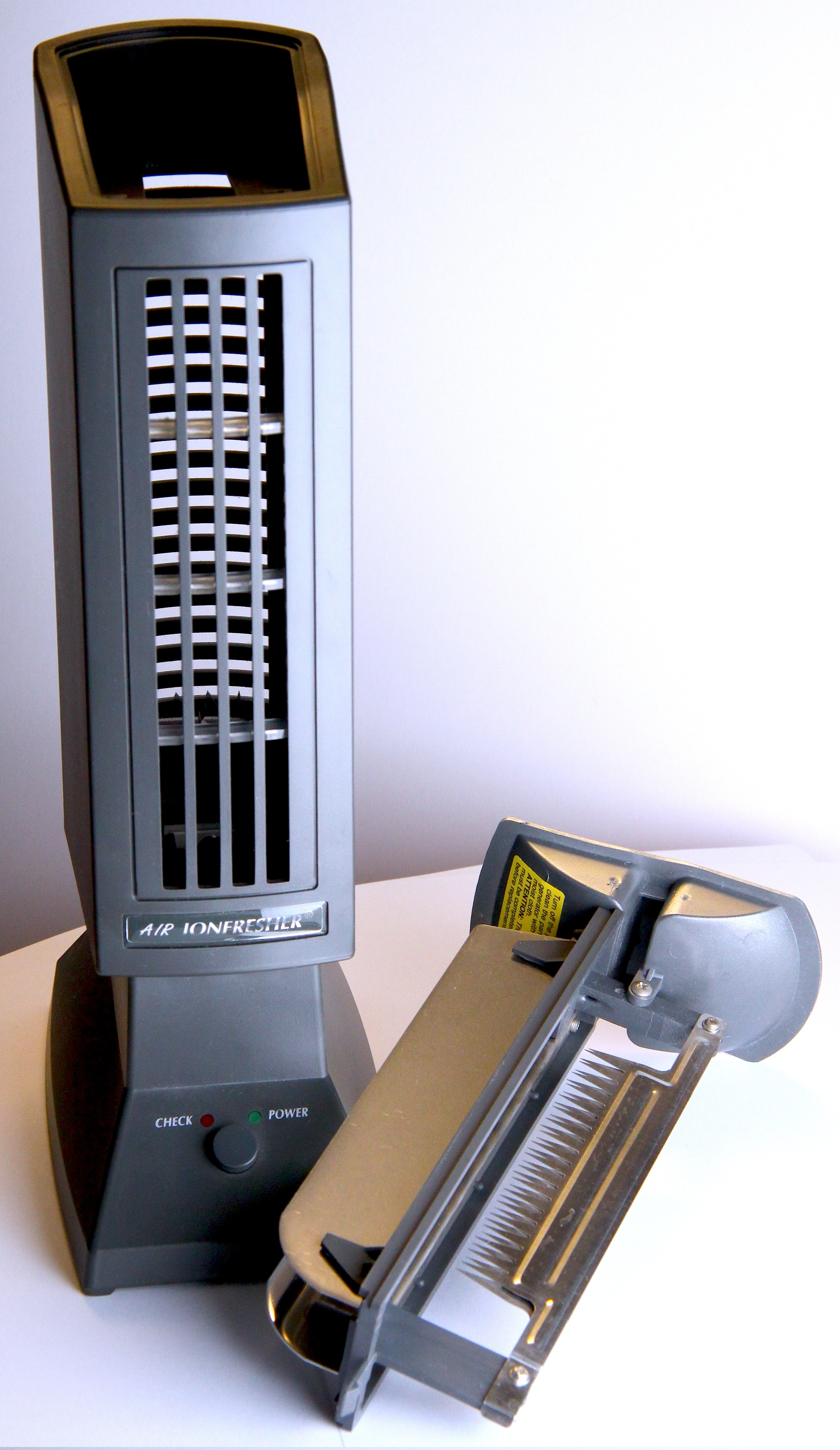
Air ioniser and purifier with its dust collection plates removed

Air ionisers are used in air purifiers to remove particles from air. Airborne particles become charged as they attract charged ions from the ioniser by electrostatic attraction. The particles in turn are then attracted to any nearby earthed (grounded) conductors, either deliberate plates within an air cleaner, or simply the nearest walls and ceilings. The frequency of nosocomial infections in British hospitals prompted the National Health Service (NHS) to research the effectiveness of anions for air purification, finding that repeated airborne Acinetobacter infections in a ward were eliminated after the installation of a negative air ioniser — a promising result, although more evidence is necessary to determine if these results can be repeated. Positive and negative ions produced by air conditioning systems have also been found by a manufacturer to inactivate viruses including influenza.

A 2018 review found that negative air ions are highly effective in removing particulate matter from air.

The SARS epidemic fuelled the desire for personal ionisers in East Asia, including Japan (where many products have been specialised to contain negative ion generators, including toothbrushes, refrigerators, air conditioners, air cleaners, and washing machines). There are no specific standards for these devices.

There are two types of ionic air purifiers, the fanless and fan base ionizers. The fan base ionizer uses its fan to circulate air around the room rapidly, but it is noisier and consumes more energy, while the fanless types distribute air slowly, taking a longer time to purify air, but are noiseless and more energy efficient.

== Ions versus ozone ==
Ionisers are distinct from ozone generators, although both devices operate in a similar way. Ionisers use electrostatically charged plates to produce positively or negatively charged air ions (for instance N_{2}^{+} or O_{2}^{−} ; these "primary" ions then immediately cluster with other air molecules such as H_{2}O) that particulate matter sticks to. Ionisers tend to produce negative ions since these are supposed to have beneficial health effects. Even the best ionisers will also produce a small amount of ozone—triatomic oxygen, O_{3}—which is unwanted. Ozone generators are optimised to attract an extra oxygen ion to an O_{2} molecule, using either a corona discharge tube or UV light.

At concentrations that do not exceed public health standards, ozone has been found to have little potential to remove indoor air contaminants. At high concentrations ozone can be toxic to air-borne bacteria, and may destroy or kill these sometimes infectious organisms. However, the required concentrations are sufficiently toxic to humans and animals that the U.S. FDA declares that ozone has no place in medical treatment and has taken action against businesses that offer ozone generators or ozone therapy to consumers. Ozone is a highly toxic and extremely reactive gas. A higher daily average than 0.1 ppm (100 ppb, 0.2 mg/m^{3}) is not recommended and can damage the lungs and olfactory bulb cells directly.

== Health effects ==
A 2013 comprehensive review of 80 years of research into air ions and respiratory function outcomes found that there was no clear support for any beneficial role in respiratory function, nor evidence for significant detrimental effect. In conclusion, "exposure to negative or positive air ions does not appear to play an appreciable role in respiratory function."

There is weak evidence that negative air ionization is associated with lower depression scores, particularly at the highest exposure level. No consistent influence of positive or negative air ionization on anxiety, mood, relaxation, sleep, and personal comfort measures was observed.

=== Adverse health effects of ozone byproduct ===
Studies have been carried out on negative ion generators. One study shows that the ozone generated can exceed guidelines in small, non ventilated areas. Another study showed that ozone can react with other constituents, namely cleaning agents to increase pollutants such as formaldehyde; this study's objective was testing for health risks associated with indoor use of cleaning products and air fresheners as opposed to adverse health effects of air ionisers.

== Consumer Reports court case ==
Consumer Reports, a non-profit U.S.-based product-testing magazine, reported in October 2003 that air ionisers do not perform to high enough standards compared to conventional HEPA filters. The exception was a combination unit that used a fan to move air while ionizing it. In response to this report, The Sharper Image, a manufacturer of air ionisers (among other products), sued Consumer's Union (the publishers of Consumer Reports) for product defamation. Consumer Reports gave the Ionic Breeze and other popular units a "fail" because they have a low clean air delivery rate (CADR). CADR measures the amount of filtered air circulated during a short period of time, and was originally designed to rate media-based air cleaners. The Sharper Image claimed that this test was a poor way to rate the Ionic Breeze, since it does not take into account other features, such as 24-hour-a-day continuous cleaning, ease of maintenance, and silent operation.

The United States District Court for the Northern District of California dismissed the case, reasoning that the Sharper Image had failed to demonstrate that it could prove any of the statements made by Consumer Reports were false. The court's final ruling in May 2005 ordered the Sharper Image to pay US$525,000 for Consumer Union's legal expenses.

== Electrostatic neutraliser in electronics ==
Air ionisers are often used in places where work is done involving static-electricity-sensitive electronic components (like in microelectronics cleanrooms), to eliminate the build-up of static charges on non-conductors. As those elements are very sensitive to electricity, they cannot be grounded because the discharge will destroy them as well. Usually, the work is done over a special dissipative table mat, which allows a very slow discharge, and under the air gush of an ioniser. The ionization falls off very sharply with distance (even in ducting), so air ionization is rarely used for this purpose, and only for items immediately adjacent to the actual ionizer.

== Standards ==
The California Air Resources Board has a page listing air cleaners (many with ionizers) meeting their indoor ozone limit of 0.050 parts per million.

== See also ==
- Dehumidifier
- Electrostatic precipitator
- Humidifier
- Nebulizer
- Negative air ionization therapy
