= Power Balance =

Hologram bracelet brand

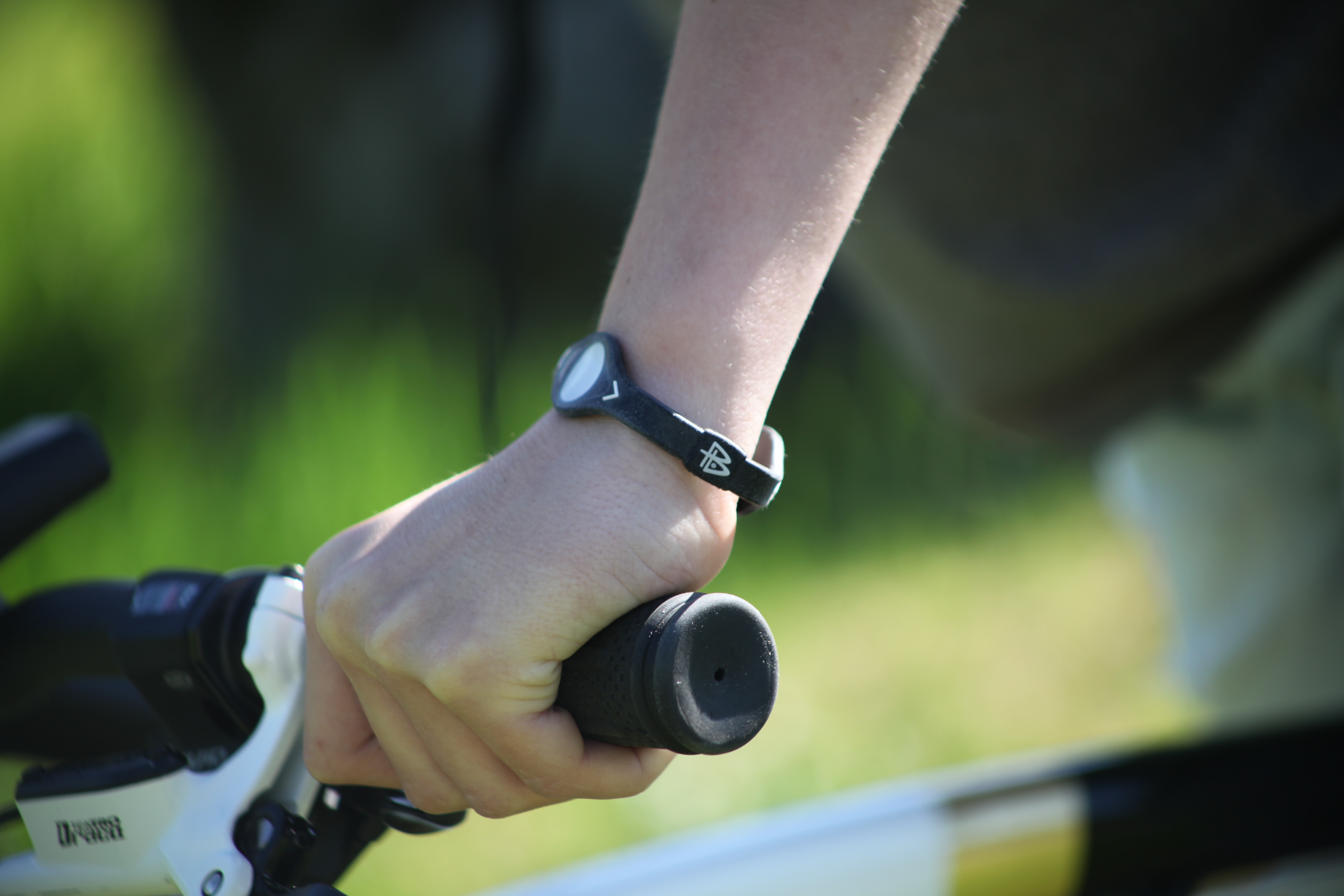
A Power Balance wrist band

Power Balance is the original brand of hologram bracelets claimed by its manufacturers and vendors to use "holographic technology" to "resonate with and respond to the natural energy field of the body" to increase athletic performance. Numerous independent studies of the device have found it to be no more effective than a placebo for enhancing athletic performance. As a result, in 2010, the Australian distributor, Power Balance Australia Pty Ltd, was forced by the Australian Competition & Consumer Commission (ACCC) to retract any previous claims.

== History ==
The product was originally promoted at trade shows in the beginning of 2006 using applied kinesiology as its effective sales tool. The bracelets went on sale in 2007 and had several celebrity endorsements. The bracelets became a trend among high school, collegiate, and professional sports teams between 2008 and 2012. This sustained prevalence compelled journalist Darren Rovell to remark that "a growing number of professional sportsmen and their attendants are starting to sound like New Age crystal healers." CNBC Sports named Power Balance Product of the Year in 2010 for its strong sales and celebrity endorsements.

Power Balance headquarters, which was located in Laguna Niguel, California, at the time, denied that they made any medical or scientific claims about their products. However, the company had been the focus of significant criticism, particularly for false advertising. The Power Balance bracelet has been described as "like the tooth fairy" and a "very successful marketing scam". Dylan Evans, a lecturer in behavioral science at Cork University's School of Medicine, stated that the marketing of Power Balance has "managed to get away without deceiving anyone in the sense of an overt lie. There are no claims on the packaging itself. They don't make any reference at all to any health outcomes. They leave that as an inference that most people will draw."

By the end of 2011, the company was reported to be approaching bankruptcy after allegedly having to settle a $57 million lawsuit, in the course of which company executives acknowledged that their past claims to improve strength and balance were not backed by science. It filed for Chapter 11 bankruptcy protection on November 22, 2011, due to a multitude of lawsuits. As of September 2022, the brand has been transferred to a new company, Power Balance Technologies, which still sells Power Balance bands and other items

== Efficacy ==
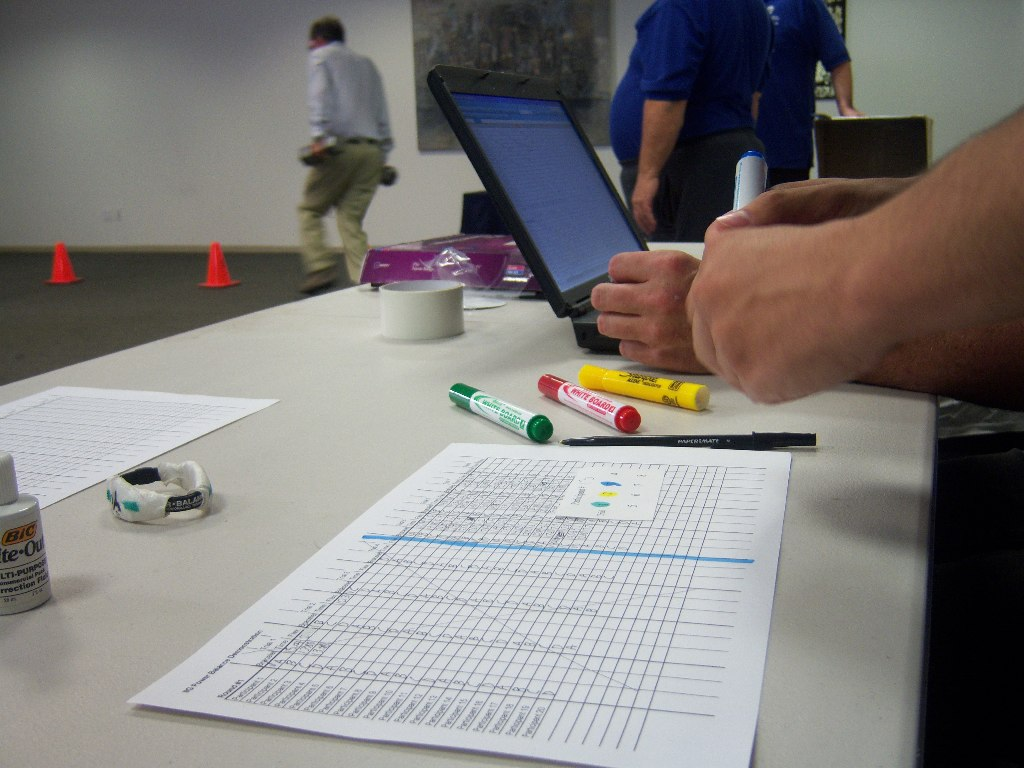
Independent Investigations Group testing Power Balance in progress, October 28, 2010

In December 2009, an informal, double-blind test was conducted by Richard Saunders of the Australian Skeptics on the Australian television program Today Tonight. The results of the test showed strong evidence that any effect that the holograms may have had was too small to be measured compared to placebo.

On October 28, 2010, Olympic champion gymnast Dominique Dawes, working for Yahoo Weekend News and Independent Investigations Group (IIG), tested Power Balance bracelets for their claim that they improve balance, flexibility and strength. According to IIG investigator Dave Richards, "There was one 'legitimate' Power Balance bracelet, and 3 'sham' bracelets that had the hologram removed from them. The experiment was double-blinded, all bracelets were wrapped with tape so no one present knew which bracelet was real and which were fakes. Neither the participants nor the people recording the scores knew which bracelet was 'real' until after all participants had completed their runs and their scores were recorded." The results indicated that there was no benefit for those who had a real holographic bracelet compared to those who had a placebo.

In 2011, researchers from RMIT's School of Health Sciences reported the results of an independent, randomized, and controlled double-blind trial. They found no difference in balance between people using a holographic wristband and those wearing a placebo.

A study at the University of Wisconsin tested the effects of Power Balance bracelets on a group of NCAA athletes. One set of the athletes received the Power Balance bracelet, while the other received a placebo bracelet. The athletes were subjected to tests of flexibility, balance, and strength, after which they switched bracelets and performed the tests again. The study found that the Power Balance bracelet had no effect, compared to the placebo, on the performance of the athletes. A group of students skeptical of the claims conducted a test which showed "no significant difference between the real wristband and the fake". Additionally, a 2012 Skeptical Inquirer study showed that, in a double-blind test of performance on an obstacle course, sixteen volunteers showed a difference in performance no greater than chance.

A 2012 study by Verdan et al. examined the effects of the Power Balance band on static balance, hamstring flexibility, and arm strength in adults. The study involved 10 male and 14 female subjects. A counterbalance, double-blind, placebo, controlled-within-subject design was used. Each of the subjects participated in 3 treatment sessions, consisting of Power Balance, placebo band, and no band. This study found that there were no statistically significant differences in strength, flexibility, or balance with regard to the treatments used.

== Criticisms ==
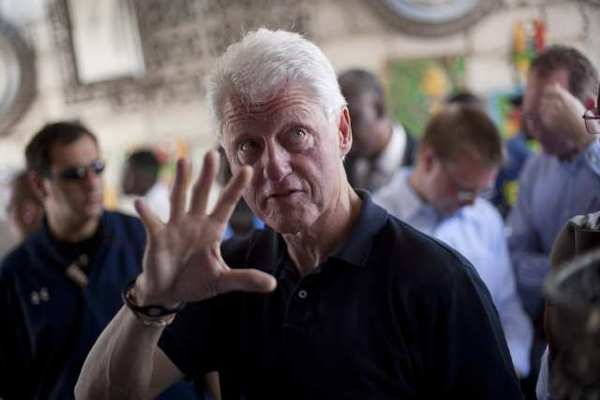
Former U.S. president Bill Clinton wearing a Power Balance Power Band.

Experts are of the opinion that the Power Balance bracelet is nothing more than a placebo. Victor Thompson, a sports psychologist based in London, said: "I'm not aware of any research that supports the technology behind these bands." Greg Whyte, professor of applied sport and exercise science at Liverpool John Moores University, said that "for generations there have been devices that claim to mediate the body's flow of energy. In most instances, the 'proof' is based on anecdotal evidence."

The Center for Inquiry noted Power Balance's use of pseudoscientific applied kinesiology tests, which it described as "problematic and full of flaws." The illustrative videos on the company's website were considered vague and unclear, and the Center noted that "most people's flexibility seems to improve from their first stretch to their second stretch regardless of whether they are wearing the bracelet."

In 2010, Harriet A. Hall wrote in the Skeptical Inquirer that she would believe anyone who claimed that a Power Balance product made them feel better, or that their performance was improved, but would not be convinced that "the improvement has anything to do with bioresonating frequencies in the holograms—or even with the cards themselves. It's like the tooth fairy. Tell me money appears under your pillow, and I will believe you. But that won't convince me that the tooth fairy did it."

Australian consumer advocate group Choice recognized Power Balance in their 2010 "Shonky Awards". The Shonky Awards are intended to "name and shame the shonkiest rip-offs and scams." The Sydney Morning Herald concluded the Power Balance bracelets "did little else than empty purchasers' wallets."

In November 2012, Dallas Mavericks owner Mark Cuban criticized an endorsement deal between the National Basketball Association and Power Balance. When a similar product was pitched on the ABC reality series Shark Tank, which features Cuban as one of the "sharks", he dismissed the product, stating "No, I'm allergic to scams. Seriously, this is not new. It's been disproven. What you saw is the placebo effect. There's athletes that wear it. It's a joke. It's a scam. It's not real."

== Legal issues ==
In November 2010, the Australian distributors of "Power Balance" were ordered by the Therapeutic Goods Administration Complaints Resolution Panel to drop "false and misleading" claims that the wearers would experience "up to a 500% increase in strength, power and flexibility" and ordered the claims removed from the company's website and a retraction posted within two weeks. The Junta de Andalucia fined the Marbella-based subsidiary a sum of €15,000 for false advertising. The consumer organization Facua made an appeal to the Health Department for an increased fine, as they considered the amount to be low enough to allow the company to stay in business.

In December 2010, the Australian Competition & Consumer Commission (ACCC) took action against Power Balance Australia Pty Ltd, stating that "claims made by Power Balance were not supported by any credible scientific evidence and therefore Power Balance has admitted that it has engaged in misleading and deceptive conduct in breach of s. 52 of the Trade Practices Act 1974." The ACCC obtained from Power Balance Australia Pty Ltd an undertaking to take a number of actions in relation to correcting their misleading advertising, including:

1. publishing, at its own expense, corrective advertisements
2. ceasing to claim that the products:
  1. will improve the user's balance, strength and flexibility; or
  2. are "designed to work with the body's natural energy field";
  3. nor, in conjunction with the Products, make claims that "Power Balance is Performance Technology" or use the phrase "Performance Technology"
3. ceasing to manufacture or import products containing the words "Performance Technology"
4. blacking out the words "Performance Technology" on its packaging
5. replacing its promotional and marketing material
6. offering full refunds, plus postage

Power Balance Australia's chief executive, Tom O'Dowd, admitted that "we'd made claims in the start that said that our product improved strength, balance, and flexibility and we didn't have the scientific, peer-reviewed, double blind testing or the level of proof that we needed to substantiate those claims". ACCC chairman Graeme Samuel stated, "It's a crock frankly. And we're very disappointed that so many people have paid hundreds of thousands if not millions of dollars to buy these Power Bands."

Power Balance Australia was required by the ACCC to run a series of advertisements in Australian media containing the following text and to unconditionally refund those they mislead:

In our advertising we stated that Power Balance wristbands improved your strength, balance and flexibility. We admit that there is no credible scientific evidence that supports our claims and therefore we engaged in misleading conduct in breach of s52 of the Trade Practices Act 1974. If you feel you have been misled by our promotions, we wish to unreservedly apologise and offer a full refund.

In December 2010, Italy's Antitrust Authority fined Power Balance €300,000 (and another company €50,000) for not having scientific proof of the claims made.

In September 2010, the Dutch Advertising Code Commission (RCC) made the following decision in the case where FIR-TEX Ltd., the plaintiff, had put Surf Unlimited Trading BV, distributor of power-balance in the Netherlands, on trial with the following complaint:

Advertiser claims on its website that the use of the Power Balance Bracelet improves balance, strength and agility. These allegations are not backed with any single (scientific) evidence. The plaintiff believes that this method of advertising is in conflict with the Dutch Advertising Code (NRC) as the link between wearing the bracelet and the health of the wearer has not been determined in any way.

The verdict of the commission was as follows:

The Commission considers the advertisement in opposition of the provisions of Article 7 NRC. It recommends advertiser not to advertise in such a way anymore.

In January 2011, a suit was filed in the United States against the company for fraud, false advertising, unfair competition, and unjust enrichment. Power Balance agreed in September 2011 to settle the class action lawsuit. The settlement terms entitled Power Balance purchasers to a full $30 refund plus $5 shipping. A hearing to finalize the agreement was canceled after Power Balance filed for Chapter 11 bankruptcy protection.

In November 2011, Power Balance filed for bankruptcy after suffering a net loss of more than $9 million that year.

As of January 2022, despite the lawsuits and bankruptcy filings, Power Balance bracelets were still being sold by Power Balance Technology. While their website states the Power Balance bracelets are based on Eastern philosophies, they say, "We make no claims and let the consumer decide based on their experience" if the bracelets work.

== See also ==
- Ionized jewelry
- List of topics characterized as pseudoscience
- Quackery
