= Pulsed-power water treatment =

Using electro-magnetic fields on cooling water

Pulsed-power water treatment is the process of using pulsed, electro-magnetic fields into cooling water to control scaling, biological growth, and corrosion. The process does not require the use of chemicals and helps eliminate environmental and health issues associated with the use and life-cycle management of chemicals used to treat water. Pulsed-power systems have the ability to maintain low levels of microbiological activity without using corrosive chemicals. Several reports have shown that pulse-powered systems yield significantly lower counts of bacteria colony forming units compared to chemically controlled systems.

== Overview and uses ==
Pulsed-power systems are used to control scale, corrosion and biological activity in cooling towers without the use of chemicals, chemical tanks or pumps. Pulsed-power has been used as the sole source of water treatment in cooling systems for over a decade now with good results. The pulsed-power imparts electromagnetic fields into the cooling water and the induced fields have a direct effect in preventing mineral scale formation on equipment surfaces and controlling microbial populations to very low levels while also significantly reducing biofilms present in cooling systems.

Pulsed-power is also an FDA approved method for pasteurizing fluids such as fruit juices. However, the energy needed for pasteurization is 100 times that of a pulsed-power water treatment system.

== Pros and cons ==
Pulsed-power treatment enables chemical-free treatment of cooling tower water while providing lower bacterial contamination as it controls scale and corrosion. The cost over the lifetime of use is lower than that of chemical treatment and also reduces the health concerns of handling chemicals. Cycles of concentration are typically increased which reduces blowdown water. The resulting elimination of chemicals provides many benefits including reduced environment, health and safety risks, environmental benefits of reusing blowdown water and elimination of chemical-laden discharge water. Pulse-power treatment is less effective on water that is extremely soft or distilled, as the technology is based on changing the way minerals in the water precipitate. It also still requires energy to use.

== See also ==
- Pulsed power
- Water cooling
- Water treatment
