= List of pseudoscience topics =

This is a list of topics that are generally considered pseudoscience by the scientific community. Pseudoscience consists of statements, beliefs, or practices that claim to be scientific or factual but are inherently incompatible with the scientific method. (Note: Definition: "A pretended or spurious science; a collection of related beliefs about the world mistakenly regarded as being based on scientific method or as having the status that scientific truths now have". Oxford English Dictionary, second edition 1989.; "Many writers on pseudoscience have emphasized that pseudoscience is non-science posing as science. The foremost modern classic on the subject (Gardner 1957) bears the title Fads and Fallacies in the Name of Science.) Detailed discussion of these topics may be found on their main pages.

Criticism of pseudoscience, generally by the scientific community or skeptical organizations, involves critiques of the logical, methodological, or rhetorical bases of the topic in question. Some of the listed topics were subject to scientific research in the past and today are considered refuted, but resurrected in a pseudoscientific fashion. Other ideas presented here are entirely non-scientific, but have in one way or another impinged on scientific domains or practices.

Many adherents or practitioners of the topics listed here dispute their characterization as pseudoscience.

== Physical sciences ==
=== Astronomy and space sciences ===
- 2012 phenomenon – is a set of end times predictions claiming catastrophic events would occur on 21 December 2012, a belief rejected by Mayanist scholars as a modern pseudoscientific misinterpretation of the Long Count calendar.
- Ancient astronauts – is the belief that extraterrestrials visited Earth in antiquity and influenced human cultures.
- Astrology – is the belief that information about human affairs may be discerned by studying the apparent positions of celestial objects. Scientific testing of astrology has been conducted and no evidence has been found to support its premises or purported effects. Where astrology has made falsifiable predictions, it has been falsified. (see also Astrology and science)
- Creationist cosmologies – are explanations of the origins of the universe based on literal readings of Genesis, considered pseudoscientific for rejecting established cosmology and lacking empirical support.
- Face on Mars – is the claim that a rock formation in Cydonia Mensae on Mars is an artificial face created by intelligent life; a belief explained by pareidolia and rejected as pseudoscience after high-resolution imaging.
- Modern flat Earth beliefs – propose that Earth is a flat disc rather than a globe.
- Moon landing conspiracy theories – are claims that the Apollo Moon landings were faked, a form of pseudoscience contradicted by extensive physical, photographic, and independent verification.
- Nibiru cataclysm – is a prediction that a rogue planet would collide with Earth, a repeatedly failed doomsday claim widely regarded as pseudoscience.

=== Earth sciences ===
- The Bermuda Triangle – is a region of the Atlantic Ocean where ship and aircraft disappearances has led to claims of unusual natural phenomena, paranormal encounters and interactions with extraterrestrials.
- Climate change denial – involves views which depart from the scientific consensus on climate change, including the extent to which it is caused by humans, its impacts on nature and human society, or the potential of adaptation to global warming by human actions.
- The Expanding Earth – was a hypothesis attempting to explain the position and relative movement of continents by increase in the volume of Earth. With the recognition of plate tectonics in the 20th century, the idea has been abandoned.
- Flood geology – is a creationist form of geology that says most of the geologic features on Earth are explainable by a global flood.
- The Hollow Earth – is a proposal that Earth is either entirely hollow or consists of hollow sections beneath the crust, including the existence of subterranean life.
- Megalithic geometry – posits the existence of an Earth-based geometry dating back to at least 3500 BCE. According to proponents, megalithic civilizations in Britain and Brittany had advanced knowledge of geometry and the size of Earth.

=== Physics ===
- Autodynamics – is a physics theory proposed in the 1940s that claims the equations of the Lorentz transformation are incorrect. This would invalidate Einstein's theories of special and general relativity, as well as Maxwell's equations.
- Free energy – is a class of perpetual motion that purports to create energy (violating the first law of thermodynamics) or extract useful work from equilibrium systems (violating the second law of thermodynamics).

- Water-fueled cars – are claimed to use water as fuel or produce fuel from water on board with no other energy input. Many such claims are part of investment frauds.
- Gasoline pill – was claimed to turn water into gasoline.
- Hongcheng Magic Liquid – is a scam in China in which a bus driver with no scientific education, claimed that he could turn regular water into a fuel by simply dissolving a few drops of his liquid in it.

- Orgone – is a pseudoscientific concept described as an esoteric energy or hypothetical universal life force, originally proposed in the 1930s.

== Applied sciences ==
=== Agriculture ===
- Lysenkoism – was a Soviet political campaign against genetics and science-based agriculture. It rejected Gregor Mendel's theory of inheritance and the concept of the "gene", and departed from Darwinian evolutionary theory by rejecting natural selection, viewing that concept as being incompatible with Marxist ideology.
- Biodynamic agriculture – is a method of organic farming that treats farms as unified and individual organisms. It uses a calendar which has been characterized as agricultural astrology and the substances and composts used have been described as unconventional and homeopathic.
- GMO skepticism – is the belief that genetically modified foods are inherently unsafe. This contradicts the scientific consensus.

=== Architecture ===
- Ley lines – is the proposal that ancient monuments were intentionally aligned with one another. A statistical analysis concluded that "the density of archaeological sites in the British landscape is so great that a line drawn through virtually anywhere will 'clip' a number of sites."

=== Health and medicine ===
Pseudoscientific medical practices are often known as quackery. In contrast, modern medicine is (or seeks to be) evidence-based.

- Abortion–breast cancer hypothesis – posits that having an induced abortion can increase the risk of breast cancer; a hypothesis that is at odds with mainstream scientific opinion and is rejected by major medical professional organizations.
- Access Consciousness – is an alternative medicine technique similar to a combination of phrenology, reiki, energy therapies and therapeutic touch, where health and wellness can be improved by touching the 32 "Energy Bars" on a person's head.
- Acupuncture – is the use of needles to stimulate acupuncture points and balance the flow of qi. There is no known anatomical or histological basis for the existence of acupuncture points or meridians. Some scholarly reviews conclude that acupuncture's effects are mainly attributable to the placebo effect. Related practices include Dry needling and Acupressure.
- Adrenal fatigue – is a pseudoscientific diagnosis that the adrenal glands are exhausted and unable to produce adequate quantities of hormones due to chronic stress or infections. Adrenal fatigue should not be confused with a number of actual forms of adrenal dysfunction such as adrenal insufficiency or Addison's disease.
- Alternative cancer treatments – are treatments for cancer that have not been approved by the government agencies responsible for the regulation of therapeutic goods and have not undergone properly conducted clinical trials. Among those that have been published, the methodology is often poor.
- Alternative or fringe medicine – is a phrase used interchangeably with alternative medicine, complementary medicine, integrative medicine, holistic medicine, natural medicine, unorthodox medicine, fringe medicine, unconventional medicine and New Age medicine; the terms are almost synonymous. Therapies are often framed as "natural" or "holistic", implicitly and intentionally suggesting that conventional medicine is "artificial" and "narrow in scope".
- Animal magnetism – was the name given by German doctor Franz Mesmer in the 18th century to what he believed to be an invisible natural force (Lebensmagnetismus) possessed by all living things. He believed that the force could have physical effects, including healing, and he tried without success to achieve scientific recognition of his ideas.
- Anthroposophic medicine – is a form of alternative medicine based on pseudoscientific and occult notions devised in the 1920s by Rudolf Steiner (1861–1925) in conjunction with Ita Wegman (1876–1943). It draws on Steiner's spiritual philosophy, which he called anthroposophy, and departs from fundamental biological, physical, and chemical principles.
- Applied kinesiology (AK) – is a technique claimed to be able to diagnose illness or choose treatment by testing muscles for strength and weakness. The American College of Allergy, Asthma and Immunology stated there is "no evidence of diagnostic validity" of applied kinesiology.
- Auriculotherapy – is based on the idea that the ear is a micro-system which reflects the entire body. Conditions are alleged to be treatable by stimulation of the surface of the ear exclusively. Similar mappings are used in other areas of the body, including the practices of reflexology and iridology. These mappings are not based on or supported by any medical or scientific evidence.
- Autistic enterocolitis – is a nonexistent medical condition proposed by discredited British gastroenterologist Andrew Wakefield when he suggested a link between a number of common symptoms and autism. The existence of such an enterocolitis has been dismissed by experts as having "not been established".
- Ayurveda – is an alternative medicine system with historical roots in the Indian subcontinent. Many ayurvedic preparations contain toxic levels of lead, mercury, and arsenic.
- Balneotherapy – is the practice of immersing a subject in mineral water or mineral-laden mud; it is part of the traditional medicine of many cultures and originated in hot springs, cold water springs, or other sources of such water, like the Dead Sea. There is no evidence to indicate it is more effective than physical exercise, relaxation therapy, or mudpacks.
- Bates method – is an alternative therapy that attributes sight problems to "strain" of the eyes and asserts that relieving such "strain" will cure the problems. Optometry professor Elwin Marg wrote of Bates, "Most of his claims and almost all of his theories have been considered false by practically all visual scientists."
- Biorhythm theory – is an attempt to predict various aspects of a person's life through simple mathematical cycles. The theory was developed by Wilhelm Fliess in the late 19th century and was popularized in the United States in the late 1970s.
- Brain Gym – is an organization promoting a series of exercises claimed to improve academic performance. Though the organization claims the methods are grounded in good neuroscience, the underlying ideas are pseudoscience.
- Candida hypersensitivity – is the idea that chronic yeast infections are responsible for many common disorders and non-specific symptoms, including fatigue, weight gain, constipation, dizziness, muscle and joint pain, asthma.
- Carnivore diet – is a fad diet in which nothing is eaten but meat. As well as being unhealthy the diet has a damaging environmental impact.
- Chiropractic – is a form of alternative medicine that diagnoses and treats disorders of the musculoskeletal system by manipulating joints and soft tissues. Proponents have claimed that such disorders affect general health via the nervous system, through vertebral subluxation, claims which are not based on scientific evidence.
- Chromotherapy (sometimes called color therapy, colorology or cromatherapy) – is the claim to be able to use light in the form of color to balance "energy" lacking from a person's body. Its practice is regarded by health experts as a form of quackery. Color therapy is distinct from other types of light therapy, such as neonatal jaundice treatment and blood irradiation therapy, which is a scientifically accepted medical treatment for a number of conditions.
- Chronic Lyme disease (not to be confused with Lyme disease) – is a generally rejected diagnosis that encompasses "a broad array of illnesses or symptom complexes for which there is no reproducible or convincing scientific evidence of any relationship to Borrelia burgdorferi infection." Despite numerous studies, there is no clinical evidence that "chronic" Lyme disease is caused by a persistent infection. It is distinct from post-treatment Lyme disease syndrome, a set of lingering symptoms which may persist after successful treatment of infection with Lyme spirochetes.
- Colon cleansing (a.k.a. colon therapy) – encompasses a number of alternative medical therapies claimed to remove nonspecific toxins from the colon and intestinal tract by removing any accumulations of feces.
- Colloidal silver – was used by physicians in the early 20th century, but its use was largely discontinued in the 1940s following the development of safer and effective modern antibiotics. Since about 1990, there has been a resurgence of the promotion of colloidal silver as a dietary supplement, marketed with claims of it being an essential mineral supplement, or that it can prevent or treat numerous diseases. No medical evidence supports the effectiveness of colloidal silver for any of these claimed indications.
- COVID-19 misinformation – consists of multiple theories proposing a wide variety of different things regarding the COVID-19 pandemic, COVID-19 itself and COVID-19 vaccines.
  - The Great Barrington Declaration – is a document that emerged from the American Institute for Economic Research during the COVID-19 pandemic, authored by three scientists. It promised a way to allow people to carry on their normal lives while invoking the impossible idea of "focused protection" for vulnerable people. The epidemiologist Michael Osterholm called it "a dangerous mix of pixie dust and pseudoscience".
- Craniosacral therapy – is a form of bodywork using gentle touch to manipulate the synarthrodial joints of the cranium. Practitioners believe that this manipulation regulates the flow of cerebrospinal fluid and aids in "primary respiration." It has been characterized as pseudoscience and its practice has been called quackery.
- Cryonics – is a variety of products, techniques, and beliefs supporting the idea that freezing the clinically dead at very low temperatures (typically below −196 degrees Celsius) will enable future revival or re-substantiation. There is no evidence a human being can be revived after such freezing and no solid scientific evidence suggests that reanimation will be possible in the future.
- Crystal healing – is the belief that crystals have healing properties. Once common among pre-scientific and indigenous peoples, it enjoyed a resurgence in popularity in the 1970s with the New Age movement. There is no scientific evidence that crystal healing has any effect.
- Cupping therapy – is an ancient form of alternative medicine where cups are applied onto the skin and suction is created, pulling the skin up. It is meant to increase blood flow to certain areas of the body. There is no good evidence it has any health benefits and there are some risks of harm, especially in case of wet and fire cupping.
- Detoxification – claims to rid the body of "toxins" – accumulated substances that allegedly exert undesirable effects on individual health in the short or long term. The concept has received criticism from scientists and health organizations for its unsound scientific basis and lack of evidence for the claims made. The "toxins" usually remain undefined, with little to no evidence of toxic accumulation in the patient.
- Ear candling – is a pseudoscientific practice claimed to improve general health and well-being by lighting one end of a hollow candle and placing the other end in the ear canal. Medical research has shown that the practice is both dangerous and ineffective and does not functionally remove earwax or toxicants.

- Earthing therapy or grounding – is a therapy that is claimed to ease pain, provide a better night's sleep, and assist with symptoms of inflammation by being in direct physical contact with the ground or a device connected to electrical ground. Practitioners claim that Earth has an excess of electrons which people are missing due to insulating shoes and ground cover.
- Electrohomeopathy – is a derivative of homeopathy invented in the 19th century by Count Cesare Mattei. It has been defined as the combination of electrical devices and homeopathy.
- Electromagnetic hypersensitivity (EHS) – is reported sensitivity to electric and magnetic fields or electromagnetic radiation at exposure levels well below established safety standards. Symptoms are inconsistent, but can include headache, fatigue, difficulty sleeping and similar non-specific indications. Studies find that "no scientific basis currently exists for a connection between EHS and exposure to electromagnetic fields."
- Energy medicine, energy therapy, energy healing, vibrational medicine, psychic healing, spiritual medicine, or spiritual healing – are branches of alternative medicine based on a pseudoscientific belief that healers can channel healing energy into a patient and effect positive results. This idea itself contains several methods: hands-on, hands-off and distant (or absent) where the patient and healer are in different locations. While early reviews of the scientific literature on energy healing were equivocal and recommended further research, more recent reviews have concluded that there is no evidence supporting clinical efficiency.
- Facilitated communication – is a scientifically discredited technique that attempts to aid communication by people with autism or other communication disabilities. The facilitator holds the disabled person's arm or hand during this process and attempts to help them move to type on a keyboard or other device. Research indicates that the facilitator is the source of the messages obtained through FC (involving ideomotor effect guidance of the arm of the patient by the facilitator).
  - Rapid prompting method – is a closely related discredited technique.
- Fad diet – is a diet that becomes popular for a short time often making pseudoscientific claims for fast weight loss or health improvements. Fad diets are not supported by clinical research and their health recommendations are not peer-reviewed, thus they often make unsubstantiated statements about health and disease.
- Faith healing – is the act of curing disease by such means as prayer and laying on of hands. There is no material benefit observed in excess of that expected by the placebo effect.
- Functional medicine – is a form of alternative medicine that encompasses a number of unproven and disproven methods and treatments. Its proponents claim that it focuses on the "root causes" of diseases based on interactions between the environment and the gastrointestinal, endocrine and immune systems to develop "individualized treatment plans". Opponents have described it as pseudoscience, quackery and, at its essence, a re-branding of complementary and alternative medicine.
- Germanic New Medicine (GNM) – claims that no real diseases exist; rather, what established medicine calls a "disease" is actually a "special meaningful program of nature" (sinnvolles biologisches Sonderprogramm) to which bacteria, viruses and fungi belong. GNM claims to explain every disease and treatment according to those premises and to thereby obviate traditional medicine. GNM is at odds with scientific understanding of human physiology.
- Germ theory denialism – is the pseudoscientific belief that germs do not cause infectious disease and that the germ theory of disease is wrong.
- Hair analysis – is, in mainstream scientific usage, the chemical analysis of a hair sample. The use of hair analysis in alternative medicine as a method of investigation to assist alternative diagnosis is controversial and its use in this manner has been opposed repeatedly by the AMA because of its unproven status and its potential for health care fraud.
- Health bracelets and various healing jewelry such as ionized bracelets, hologram bracelets and magnetic jewelry – are purported to improve the health, heal, or improve the chi of the wearer. No claims of effectiveness made by manufacturers have ever been substantiated by independent sources.
- Hexagonal water – is term used in a marketing scam that claims the ability to create a certain configuration of water that is better for the body. The term "hexagonal water" refers to a cluster of water molecules forming a hexagonal shape that supposedly enhances nutrient absorption, removes metabolic wastes and enhances cellular communication, among other things.
- Homeopathy – is the belief that a patient with symptoms of an illness can be treated with extremely dilute remedies that produce those same symptoms in healthy people. These preparations are often diluted beyond the point where any treatment molecule is likely to remain. Studies of homeopathic practice have been largely negative or inconclusive.

- Bach flower remedies – are solutions of brandy and water—the water containing extreme dilutions of flower material developed by Edward Bach, an English homeopath, in the 1930s. Bach claimed that dew found on flower petals retain imagined healing properties of that plant. Systematic reviews of clinical trials of Bach flower solutions have found no efficacy beyond a placebo effect.

- Iridology – is the practice of diagnosing health problems through examination of the markings and patterns of the iris. Practitioners divide the iris into 80–90 zones, each of which is connected to a particular body region or organ. This connection has not been scientifically validated and disorder detection is neither selective nor specific. Because iris texture is a phenotypical feature which develops during gestation and remains unchanged after birth (which makes the iris useful for Biometrics), iridology is all but impossible.
- Jilly Juice – is a potentially dangerous fermented drink that has been claimed to treat a variety of medical conditions.
- Leaky gut syndrome – is a proposed condition caused by the passage of harmful substances outward through the gut wall. It has been proposed as the cause of many conditions, including multiple sclerosis and autism, a claim which has been called pseudoscientific. According to the UK National Health Service, the theory is vague and unproven. Some skeptics and scientists say that the marketing of treatments for leaky gut syndrome is either misguided or an instance of deliberate health fraud.
- Lightning Process – is a system claimed to be derived from osteopathy, neuro-linguistic programming (NLP) and life coaching. Proponents claim that the Process can have a positive effect on a long list of diseases and conditions, including myalgic encephalomyelitis, despite no scientific evidence of efficacy.
- Looksmaxxing – is a self-improvement practice popularized by social media that emphasizes maximizing male physical attractiveness. Practitioners use scientific and medical terminology, and may seek surgical interventions or use testosterone injections or anabolic steroids, but the practice is based heavily on anecdotal evidence and ideological claims linked to the manosphere and the incel online subculture.
- Magnet therapy – is the practice of using magnetic fields to positively influence health. While there are legitimate medical uses for magnets and magnetic fields, the field strength used in magnetic therapy is too low to effect any biological change and the methods used have no scientific validity.

- Magnet therapy is not to be confused with current health treatments involving electromagnetism on human tissue, such as pulsed electromagnetic field therapy (see: Electromagnetic therapy).

- A medical intuitive – is an alternative medicine practitioner who claims to use their self-described intuitive abilities to find the cause of a physical or emotional condition through the use of insight rather than modern medicine. Other terms for such a person include medical clairvoyant, medical psychic, or intuitive counselor.
- Morgellons – is the informal name of a self-diagnosed, unexplained skin condition in which individuals have sores that they believe contain some kind of fibers. Morgellons is poorly characterized, but the general medical consensus is that it is a form of delusional parasitosis.
- Nambudripad's Allergy Elimination Techniques (NAET) – are a form of alternative medicine which proponents claim can treat allergies and related disorders. Devised in 1983, it is based on a combination of ideas from applied kinesiology, acupuncture, acupressure, nutritional management and chiropractic methods. There is no credible evidence to support its effectiveness in assessing or treating allergies.
- Naturopathy – is a type of alternative medicine based on a belief in vitalism, which posits that a special energy called vital energy or vital force guides bodily processes such as metabolism, reproduction, growth and adaptation. Naturopathy has been characterized as pseudoscience.
- Negative air ionization therapy – is the use of air ionizers as an experimental non-pharmaceutical treatment. It is widely considered pseudoscience.
- Oil pulling – is a folk remedy where oil is "swished" or "held" in the mouth for up to 20 minutes with the goal of improving oral as well as systemic health. It is said that this technique "pulls out" toxins from the body and is claimed to be able to treat a plethora of conditions from migraines to diabetes.
- Orthomolecular medicine, sometimes referred to as megavitamin therapy, – is a form of alternative medicine that aims to maintain human health through nutritional supplementation. Treatment for disease, according to this view, involves attempts to correct "imbalances or deficiencies based on individual biochemistry" by use of substances such as vitamins, minerals, amino acids, trace elements and fatty acids. The notions behind orthomolecular medicine are not supported by sound medical evidence and the therapy is not effective.
- Osteopathic manipulative medicine (OMM) – is a pseudoscientific system of alternative medicine that emphasizes physical manipulation of the body's muscle tissue and bones. It is distinct from osteopathic medicine, which is a branch of the medical profession in the United States. OMM has been proposed as a treatment for a number of human ailments, including Parkinson's disease, pancreatitis and pneumonia, but has only been found to be effective for lower back pain by virtue of the spinal manipulation used.
- Pulse diagnosis – is a diagnostic technique used in Ayurveda, traditional Chinese medicine, traditional Mongolian medicine, Siddha medicine, traditional Tibetan medicine and Unani. It has no scientific legitimacy, and is ill-defined, subjective and unreliable.
- Radionics – is a form of alternative medicine that claims that disease can be diagnosed and treated by applying electromagnetic radiation (EMR), such as radio waves, to the body from an electrically powered device. There is no scientific evidence for the efficacy or underlying premise of radionics devices.
- Reiki – is a form of alternative medicine called energy healing. Reiki practitioners use a technique called palm healing or hands-on healing through which a "universal energy" is said to be transferred through the palms of the practitioner to the patient in order to encourage emotional or physical healing. Reiki is a pseudoscience, and is used as an illustrative example of pseudoscience in scholarly texts and academic journal articles.
- Reflexology – is an alternative medicine involving applying pressure to the feet, hands, or ears. It is based on what reflexologists claim to be a system of zones and reflex areas that they say reflect an image of the body on the feet and hands. A 2009 systematic review of randomized controlled trials concluded that the evidence does not demonstrate convincingly that reflexology is an effective treatment for any medical condition.
- Rolfing (also called Structural Integration) – is body manipulation claimed by practitioners to be capable of ridding the body of traumatic memories stored in the muscles. There is no evidence that rolfing is effective as a treatment for any condition.
- Therapeutic touch – is a form of vitalism where a practitioner, who may be also a nurse, passes their hands over and around a patient to "realign" or "rebalance" a putative energy field. A recent review concluded that "[t]here is no evidence that [Therapeutic Touch] promotes healing of acute wounds." No biophysical basis for such an energy field has been found.
- Traditional Chinese medicine (TCM) – is a traditional medical system originating in China and practiced as an alternative medicine throughout much of the world. It contains elements based in the cosmology of Taoism and considers the human body more in functional and vitalistic than anatomical terms. Health and illness in TCM follow the principle of yin and yang and are ascribed to balance or imbalance in the flow of a vital force, qi. The TCM description of the function and structure of the human body is fundamentally different from modern medicine.
  - TCM materia medica – is a collection of crude medicines used in traditional Chinese medicine. These include many plants in part or whole, such as ginseng and wolfberry, as well as more exotic ingredients, such as seahorses. Preparations generally include several ingredients in combination, with selection based on physical characteristics such as taste or shape, or relationship to the organs of TCM.
  - Gua sha (Chinese: 刮痧), kerokan or coining – is the practice of using a tool to scrape people's skin to cause tissue damage in the belief this has medicinal benefit. Gua sha is sometimes referred to as "scraping", "spooning" or "coining" by English speakers.
  - Meridians – are the channels through which qi flows, connecting the several zang-fu organ pairs. There is no known anatomical or histological basis for the existence of acupuncture points or meridians.
  - Shiatsu (指圧) – is a form of Japanese bodywork based on ideas in traditional Chinese medicine. Shiatsu derives from a Japanese massage modality called anma. There is no evidence that shiatsu is an effective medical treatment.
  - Qi – is vital energy whose flow must be balanced for health. Qi has never been directly observed and is unrelated to the concept of energy used in science.
  - Qigong – is a holistic system of coordinated body posture and movement, breathing and meditation used for the purposes of health, spirituality and martial arts training. Research concerning qigong has been conducted for a wide range of medical conditions, including hypertension, pain and cancer, and with respect to quality of life. Most research concerning health benefits of qigong has been of poor quality, such that it would be unwise to draw firm conclusions at this stage.
  - Zang-fu – is the concept of organs as functional yin and yang entities for the storage and manipulation of qi. These organs are not based in anatomy.
- Tomatis Method A type of auditory integration training devised by Alfred A. Tomatis and promoted, without supporting evidence, as being of benefit to people with autism.
- Urine therapy – entails drinking either one's own undiluted urine or homeopathic potions of urine for treatment of a wide variety of diseases is based on pseudoscience.
- Promotion of a link between autism and vaccines – are pseudoscientific accusations that vaccines cause, trigger or aggravate autism-spectrum conditions. Epidemiological studies have reported no association between either the MMR vaccine and autism, or thimerosal-containing vaccines and autism.
- Vaccine overload – is a non-medical term describing the notion that giving many vaccines at once may overwhelm or weaken a child's immature immune system and lead to adverse effects that is contradicted by scientific evidence.
- Vitalism – is the doctrine that the processes of life are not explicable by the laws of physics and chemistry alone and that life is, in some part, self-determining. The book Encyclopedia of Pseudoscience: From Alien Abductions to Zone Therapy states "Vitalists claim to be scientific, but in fact they reject the scientific method with its basic postulates of cause and effect and of provability."
- Water memory – is a homeopathic theory based on the purported ability of water to retain a memory of substances previously dissolved in it.
- Wilson's syndrome (not to be confused with Wilson's disease) – is an alternative medicine concept, not recognized as a legitimate diagnosis in evidence-based medicine. Its supporters describe Wilson's syndrome as a mix of common and non-specific symptoms which they attribute to low body temperature and impaired conversion of thyroxine (T4) to triiodothyronine (T3), despite normal thyroid function tests.
- Wind turbine syndrome and wind farm syndrome – are terms for adverse health effects that have been ascribed to the proximity of wind turbines. Proponents have claimed that these effects include death, cancer and congenital abnormality. Reviews of the scientific literature have consistently found no reason to believe that wind turbines are harmful to health.

=== Technology ===
- 5G conspiracies and 5G causes coronavirus theories – are theories proposing that 5G causes health issues, including COVID-19. There are no scientifically proven adverse health impacts from the exposure to 5G radio frequency radiation with levels below those suggested by the guidelines of regulating bodies.
- Audiophile tweaks – are modifications to home audio equipment, such as exotic cables, stones, cones, CD markers, and power conditioners that are often marketed using pseudoscientific claims. Some popular audiophile publications reject the scientific method of double-blind testing.
- Tin foil hat – is a hat made from aluminum foil, or a piece of conventional headgear lined with foil, worn in the belief it shields the brain from threats such as electromagnetic fields, mind control and mind reading. The usage of a metal foil hat for protection against interference of the mind was mentioned in a science fiction short story by Julian Huxley, "The Tissue-Culture King", first published in 1926.

== Social sciences ==
=== History ===
- Christ myth theory – is a fringe theory that proposes that the historical Jesus did not exist. Scholars of antiquity universally agree that Jesus of Nazareth was a Galilean Jew who lived in the first century, was baptized, and later crucified by Roman authorities.
- Holocaust denial – is the negationist and antisemitic claim that Nazi Germany and its collaborators did not commit genocide against European Jews during World War II, ignoring overwhelming historical evidence to the contrary.
- Khazar hypothesis of Ashkenazi ancestry – postulates that Ashkenazi Jews were descended from Khazars, a multi-ethnic conglomerate of mostly Turkic peoples. Genetic studies on Jews have found no substantive evidence of a Khazar origin among Ashkenazi Jews.
- New chronology (Fomenko) – is the pseudohistorical conspiracy theory which argues that events of antiquity generally attributed to the civilizations of the Roman Empire, Ancient Greece and Ancient Egypt, actually occurred during the Middle Ages.

=== Linguistics ===
- Japhetic theory – is the claim that the Afroasiatic, Basque, and Kartvelian language families share a common origin.
- Sun Language Theory – is the belief that all languages had their origins in the Turkish language.

=== Psychology ===
- Attachment therapy – is a set of potentially fatal clinical interventions and parenting techniques aimed at controlling aggressive, disobedient, or unaffectionate children using "restraint and physical and psychological abuse to seek their desired results." It is not based on traditional attachment theory and shares no principles of mainstream developmental psychology research.
- Brain types – is a system developed by Jonathan P. Niednagel that categorizes people into one of 16 brain types, similar to the Myers–Briggs Type Indicator.
- Conversion therapy – is the pseudoscientific practice of attempting to change an individual's sexual orientation, romantic orientation, gender identity, or gender expression to align with heterosexual and cisgender norms.
- Coding – is a catch-all term for various Russian alternative therapeutic methods used to treat addictions, in which the therapist attempts to scare patients into abstinence by convincing them that they will be harmed or killed if they use it again.
- Facilitated communication (FC) – is a scientifically discredited technique that attempts to facilitate communication by people with severe communication disabilities. Research indicates that the facilitator is the source of most or all messages obtained through FC.
- Graphology – is the claim that personality traits or employment suitability can be discerned by examining handwriting.
- Hypnosis – is a state of focused attention, reduced peripheral awareness, and an enhanced capacity to respond to suggestion. Researchers disagree about whether hypnosis is a real phenomenon, or merely a form of participatory role-enactment. While some aspects have been clinically useful, others more clearly fall within the area of pseudoscience, such as the use of hypnotic regression, including past life regression.
- Law of attraction – is the idea that by focusing on positive or negative thoughts a person brings positive or negative experiences into their life. Critics have asserted that the evidence provided is usually anecdotal and that, because of the self-selecting nature of the positive reports, as well as the subjective nature of any results, these reports are susceptible to confirmation bias and selection bias.
- Myers–Briggs Type Indicator – is a self-report questionnaire that makes pseudoscientific claims to categorize individuals into 16 distinct psychological types (often called personality types). The test has consistent problems with repeatability.
- Neuro-linguistic programming – asserts a connection between neurological processes, language, and acquired behavioral patterns, and that these can be changed to achieve specific goals in life. NLP is unsupported by current scientific evidence.
- Odic force – is the hypothetical life force used to explain hypnosis.
- Parapsychology – is the study of alleged psychic phenomena: extrasensory perception, telepathy, teleportation, precognition, clairvoyance, psychokinesis, and other paranormal claims. It is rejected by the majority of mainstream scientists.
- Phrenology – is a now defunct system for determining personality traits by feeling bumps on the skull proposed by 18th-century physiologist Franz Joseph Gall.
- Polygraph ("lie detection") – is an interrogation method which measures several physiological indicators while the subject answers a series of questions. The belief is that deceptive answers can be determined from these measurements. Polygraphy has little credibility among scientists.
- Sluggish schizophrenia – is a diagnosis used in some Communist nations to justify the involuntary commitment of political dissidents to mental institutions.
- Somatotype and constitutional psychology – are theories proposed in the 1940s by the American psychologist William Herbert Sheldon to categorize the human physique and to associate his classifications with human temperament types.
- Voice stress analysis – is a junk science technology that is advertised to infer deception from stress measured in the voice, often used in a similar manner to a polygraph examination.

=== Racial theories ===
- Scientific racism – is the claim that scientific evidence shows the inferiority or superiority of certain races.

- Aryanism – is the claim that there is a distinct "Aryan race" that is superior to other putative races was an important tenet of Nazism and "the basis of the German government policy of exterminating Jews, Gypsies, and other 'non-Aryans.'"
- Drapetomania – was a conjectural mental illness that was hypothesized as the cause of enslaved Africans fleeing captivity. It has since been debunked as pseudoscience and part of the edifice of scientific racism.
- Melanin theory – is a belief founded in the distortion of known physical properties of melanin, that posits the inherent superiority of dark-skinned people and the essential inhumanity and inferiority of light-skinned people.
- Turkish History Thesis – is the belief that Turks from Central Asia migrated and brought civilization to China, India, the Middle East, and Europe.

=== Sociology ===
- Alpha and beta male – are pseudoscientific terms for men derived from alpha and beta animals in ethology. Often used by members of the "manosphere," these terms have been criticized by scientists and are often considered sexist.
- Unilineal evolution – is a pseudoscientific, and often political, incorporation of social progress with evolutionary thought. Before Darwin's work On the Origin of Species, some models of evolution incorporated Enlightenment ideas of social progress.

== Paranormal ==
Paranormal topics concern events that are beyond the normal range of human experience or are not explainable by scientific theories.

- Channeling – is communication of information to or through a person allegedly from a spirit or other paranormal entity.
- Crop circles – are geometric designs of crushed or knocked-over crops. Although explanations for their formation include UFOs and anomalous, tornado-like air currents they are "landscape art made by humans".
- Cryptozoology – is the search for creatures that are considered not to exist by most biologists. Well-known examples include Bigfoot, the Yeren, the Yeti, and the Loch Ness Monster.
- Dowsing – is a process that allegedly can detect hidden water, metals, gemstones or other objects without the use of technical equipment or a scientific apparatus.
- Electronic voice phenomenon – purported communication by spirits through tape recorders and other electronic devices.
- Extra-sensory perception – is the ability (independent of the five main senses or deduction from previous experience) to acquire information by means such as telepathy, clairvoyance, precognition, psychometry, psychic abilities, and remote viewing.
- Ghost hunting – is the process of investigating locations that are reported to be haunted by ghosts. Ghost hunters use a variety of electronic devices, including EMF meters, digital thermometers, digital cameras, including thermographic and night vision cameras.
- Lizard people – are purported shapeshifting reptilian aliens who control Earth by taking on human form and gaining political power to manipulate human societies.
- Levitation – is the act of rising up from the ground without any physical aids, usually by the power of thought.
- Palmistry – is the belief that the future can be foretold through palm reading. Predictions are based on the shape, line, and mounts of the hands. Palmists use cold reading in order to appear psychic.
- Parapsychology – (see Psychology section above)
- Pseudoarchaeology – is the investigation of the ancient past using alleged paranormal or other means which have not been validated by mainstream science.
- Psychic surgery – is the use sleight of hand to make it appear that they are reaching into a patient's body and extracting "tumors". Psychic surgery is usually explicit deception; i.e., the "practitioners" are aware that they are practicing fraud or "quackery".
- Psychokinesis – is the paranormal ability of the mind to influence matter or energy at a distance.
- Séances – are ritualized attempts to communicate with the dead.
- Ufology – is the study of unidentified flying objects (UFOs) that sometimes includes the belief that UFOs are evidence of extraterrestrial visitors.

== Numerology ==
- Numerology (including the numerology practices of Kabbalah) – is a set of beliefs in a divine, mystical, or other special relationship between a number and coinciding events. Numerology is regarded as pseudomathematics or pseudoscience by modern scientists.
- Scriptural codes – is the belief that a book or fragment of holy scripture contains encoded messages that impart esoteric knowledge. One such decoding method involves identifying "equidistant letter sequences" that spell out such messages.

== Religious and spiritual beliefs ==
Spiritual and religious practices and beliefs, according to astronomer Carl Sagan, are normally not classified as pseudoscience. However, religion can sometimes nurture pseudoscience, and "at the extremes it is difficult to distinguish pseudoscience from rigid, doctrinaire religion", and some religions might be confused with pseudoscience, such as traditional meditation. The following religious/spiritual items have been related to or classified as pseudoscience in some way:

- Christian Science – is generally considered a Christian new religious movement; however, some have called it "pseudoscience" because its founder, Mary Baker Eddy, used "science" in its name, and because of its former stance against medical science.
- Energy – is used by practitioners of various esoteric forms of spirituality and alternative medicine to refer to claimed experiences and phenomena that defy measurement and thus can be distinguished from the scientific form of energy. There is no scientific evidence for the existence of such energy.
- Koranic scientific foreknowledge (or Qur'anic science or Hadeeth science) – asserts that foundational Islamic religious texts made accurate statements about the world that science verified hundreds of years later. According to Turkish American physicist Taner Edis, many Muslims appreciate technology, which has led to a great deal of Islamic pseudoscience attempting to reconcile science with traditional Muslim religious beliefs.
- Quantum mysticism – builds on a superficial similarity between certain New Age concepts and counter-intuitive quantum mechanical concepts as the uncertainty principle, entanglement, and wave–particle duality, while generally ignoring the limitations imposed by quantum decoherence.
- Scientology:
  - Dianetics – is L. Ron Hubbard's 1950 technique that attempts to treat neuroses, psychoses, and psychosomatic illnesses by removing a person's reactive mind; now part of Scientology, the technique has been rejected by the psychological and medical establishments as pseudoscientific and ineffective.
  - Purification Rundown – and Scientology's secular business Narconon – are processes that purport to clear toxins and drugs from the human body by lengthy sweating sessions in a sauna and consumption of large doses of vitamins including niacin; the process has been described as medically unsafe, quackery, and medical fraud.
- Transcendental Meditation (TM) – is a specific form of silent mantra meditation. It is not possible to say whether TM has any effect on health, as the research is of poor quality, and is marred by a high risk for bias due to the connection of researchers to the TM organization and by the selection of subjects with a favorable opinion of TM.

=== Creation science ===
Creation science or scientific creationism – is a branch of creationism that claims to provide scientific support for the Genesis creation narrative in the Book of Genesis and disprove or reexplain the scientific facts, theories and scientific paradigms about geology, cosmology, biological evolution, archaeology, history and linguistics.

- Baraminology – is a taxonomic system that classifies animals into groups called "created kinds" or "baramins" according to the account of creation in the book of Genesis and other parts of the Bible.
- Creation biology – is a subset of creation science that tries to explain biology without macroevolution.
- Creationist cosmologies – are cosmologies which, among other things, allow for a universe that is only thousands of years old.
- Flood geology – is a creationist form of geology that advocates most of the geologic features on Earth are explainable by a global flood.
  - Searches for Noah's Ark – are attempts to find the burial site of Noah's Ark. There have been numerous expeditions with several false claims of success; the practice is widely regarded as pseudoscience, more specifically pseudoarchaeology.
- Intelligent design – attempt to cast creationism in the language of science, invoking concepts such as:
  - Irreducible complexity – is the claim that some biological systems are too complex to have evolved from simpler systems. It is used by proponents of intelligent design to argue that evolution by natural selection alone is incomplete or flawed, and that some additional mechanism (an "Intelligent Designer") is required to explain the origins of life.
  - Specified complexity – is the claim that when something is simultaneously complex and specified, one can infer that it was produced by an intelligent cause (i.e., that it was designed) rather than being the result of natural processes.

== Idiosyncratic ideas ==
The following concepts have only a very small number of proponents, yet have become notable:

- Aquatic ape hypothesis – is the idea that the ancestors of modern humans took a divergent evolutionary pathway from the other great apes by becoming adapted to a more aquatic habitat.
- Lawsonomy – is a proposed philosophy and system of claims about physics made by baseball player and aviator Alfred Lawson.
- Morphic resonance – is the idea that natural systems, such as termite colonies, or insulin molecules, "...inherit a collective memory from all previous things of their kind".
- N rays – are a hypothesized form of radiation that briefly inspired significant scientific interest, but were subsequently found to have been a result of confirmation bias.
- Penta Water – is the claimed structural reorganization of liquid water into small clusters of five molecules each. Neither these clusters nor their asserted benefits to humans have been shown to exist.
- Polywater – is the hypothetical polymerized form of water proposed in the 1960s with a higher boiling point, lower freezing point, and much higher viscosity than ordinary water. It was later found not to exist, with the anomalous measurements being explained by biological contamination.
- Time Cube – is a website created by Gene Ray, in 1997, where he sets out his personal model of reality, which he calls Time Cube. He suggests that all of modern physics is wrong, and his Time Cube model proposes that each day is really four separate days occurring simultaneously.
- Timewave zero – is a numerological formula that was invented by psychonaut Terence McKenna with the help of the hallucinogenic drug dimethyltryptamine.
- Torsion field – is a hypothetical physical field responsible for extra-sensory perception, homeopathic cures, levitation, telepathy, clairvoyance, telekinesis, and other paranormal phenomena.

== See also ==
- Alternative facts
- Blood type diet
- Blood type personality theory
- Cargo cult science
- Church of the SubGenius
- Denialism
- Fan death
- Fringe science
- List of books about skepticism
- List of cognitive biases
- List of common misconceptions
- List of conspiracy theories
- List of cryptids
- List of diagnoses characterized as pseudoscience
- List of memory biases
- List of patent medicines
- Observational error
- Occam's razor
- Paradigm shift
- 'Pataphysics [sic]
- Pathological science
- Philosophy of science
- Protoscience
- Pseudophilosophy
- Pyramidology
