= Applied kinesiology =

Alternative medicine technique

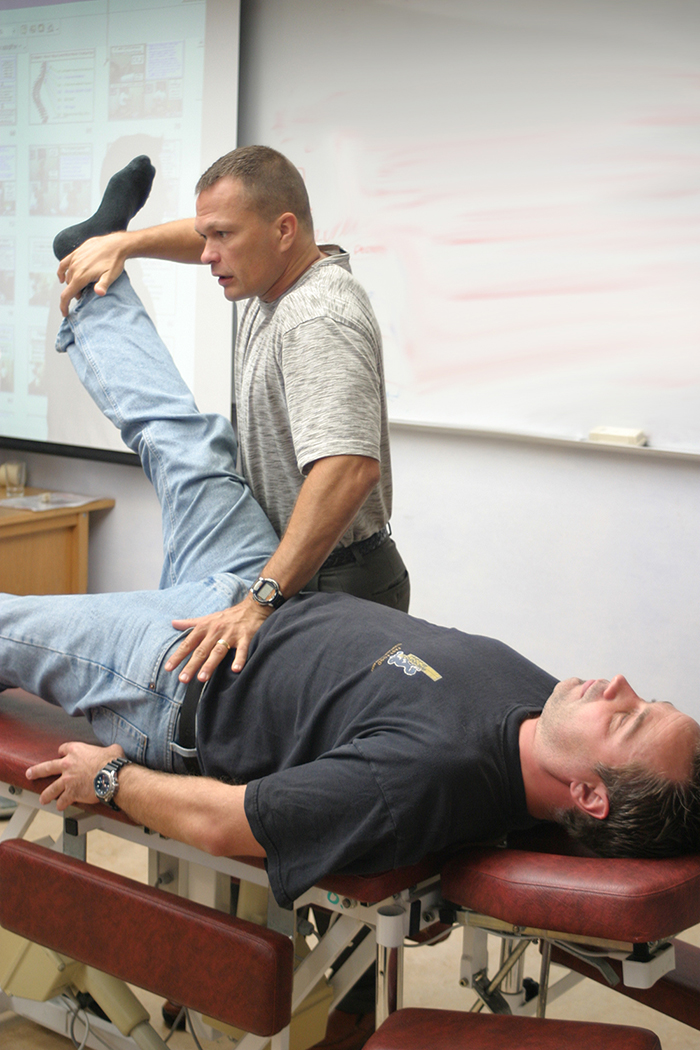
- An applied kinesiologist demonstrating a manual muscle test (MMT) of psoas major and iliacus muscles

Alternative therapy
- MeSH: D018953

Applied kinesiology (AK), also known as muscle testing, is a pseudoscience-based technique in alternative medicine claimed to be able to diagnose illness or choose treatment by testing muscles for strength and weakness.

According to their guidelines on allergy diagnostic testing, the American College of Allergy, Asthma and Immunology stated there is "no evidence of diagnostic validity" of applied kinesiology. Another study indicated that the use of applied kinesiology to evaluate nutrient status is "no more useful than random guessing." The American Cancer Society has said that "scientific evidence does not support the claim that applied kinesiology can diagnose or treat cancer or other illness".

== History and current use ==
George J. Goodheart, a chiropractor, originated applied kinesiology in 1964 and began teaching it to other chiropractors. An organization of Goodheart Study Group Leaders began meeting in 1973, selected the name "The International College of Applied Kinesiology" (ICAK) in 1974, adopted bylaws in 1975, elected officers in 1975, and "certified" its charter members (called "diplomates") in 1976. ICAK now considers 1976 to be the date it was founded and 1973 to be the date that its first chairman took office.

AK grew in popularity among Mormon alternative medicine culture. In Educated, Tara Westover recounts her Mormon mother beginning to practice AK in the mid-to-late 1990s. In 2007, Mormon chiropractor Bradley Nelson published the AK book The Emotion Code, which further popularized the practice.

While AK is primarily used by chiropractors, it is also used by many other practitioners of complementary therapy. In 2003, it was the 10th most frequently used chiropractic technique in the United States, with 37.6% of chiropractors employing this method and 12.9% of patients being treated with it. Some basic AK-based techniques have also been used by nutritional supplement distributors, including multilevel distributors.

== Claims ==
Applied kinesiology is presented as a system that evaluates structural, chemical, and mental aspects of health by using a method referred to as muscle response testing or manual muscle testing (MMT) alongside conventional diagnostic methods. The essential premise of applied kinesiology, which is not shared by mainstream medical theory, is that every organ dysfunction is accompanied by a weakness in a specific corresponding muscle, known as the "viscerosomatic relationship". Treatment modalities relied upon by AK practitioners include joint manipulation and mobilization, myofascial, cranial and meridian therapies, clinical nutrition, and dietary counseling.

=== Muscle testing ===
A manual muscle test in AK is conducted by having the patient use the target muscle or muscle group to resist while the practitioner applies a force. A smooth response is sometimes referred to as a "strong muscle," and a response that was not appropriate is sometimes called a "weak response". This is not a raw test of strength, but rather a subjective evaluation of tension in the muscle and smoothness of response, taken to be indicative of a difference in spindle cell response during contraction. These differences in muscle response are claimed to be indicative of various stresses and imbalances in the body. A weak muscle test is equated to dysfunction and chemical or structural imbalance or mental stress, indicative of suboptimal functioning. It may be suboptimal functioning of the tested target muscle, or a normally optimally functioning muscle can be used as an indicator muscle for other physiological testing. A commonly known and very basic test is the arm-pull-down test, or "Delta test," where the patient resists as the practitioner exerts a downward force on an extended arm. Proper positioning is paramount to ensure that the muscle in question is isolated or positioned as the prime mover, minimizing interference from adjacent muscle groups.

=== Nutrient testing ===
Nutrient testing is used to examine the response of a patient's various muscles to assorted chemicals. Gustatory and olfactory stimulation are said to alter the outcome of a manual muscle test, with previously weak muscles being strengthened by application of the correct nutritional supplement, and previously strong muscles being weakened by exposure to harmful or imbalancing substances or allergens. Though its use is deprecated by the ICAK, stimulation to test muscle response to a certain chemical is also done by contact or proximity (for instance, testing while the patient holds a bottle of pills).

=== Therapy localization ===
Therapy localization is another diagnostic technique using manual muscle testing, which is unique to applied kinesiology. The patient places a hand that is not being tested on the skin over an area suspected to need therapeutic attention. This fingertip contact may lead to a change in muscle response from strong to weak or vice versa when therapeutic intervention is indicated. If the area touched is not associated with a need for such intervention, the muscle response is unaffected.

== Scientific research ==
In 2015 the Australian Government's Department of Health published the results of a review of alternative therapies that sought to determine if any were suitable for being covered by health insurance; applied kinesiology was one of 17 therapies evaluated for which no clear evidence of effectiveness was found. According to the American Cancer Society, "available scientific evidence does not support the claim that applied kinesiology can diagnose or treat cancer or other illness".

A review of several scientific studies of AK-specific procedures and diagnostic tests concluded: "When AK is disentangled from standard orthopedic muscle testing, the few studies evaluating unique AK procedures either refute or cannot support the validity of AK procedures as diagnostic tests. The evidence to date does not support the use of manual muscle testing for the diagnosis of organic disease or pre/subclinical conditions." Another concluded that "There is little or no scientific rationale for these methods. Results are not reproducible when subject to rigorous testing and do not correlate with clinical evidence of allergy." A double-blind study was conducted by the ALTA Foundation for Sports Medicine Research in Santa Monica, California, and published in the June 1988 Journal of the American Dietetic Association. The study used three experienced AK practitioners and concluded that, "The results of this study indicated that the use of applied kinesiology to evaluate nutrient status is no more useful than random guessing."

Despite more than four decades of review, RCT (randomized, controlled trials) and other evaluative methods, even invested researchers delivered the following opinion:

One shortcoming is the lack of RCTs to substantiate (or refute) the clinical utility (efficacy, effectiveness) of chiropractic interventions based on MMT findings. Also, because the etiology of a muscle weakness may be multifactorial, any RCT that employs only one mode of therapy to only one area of the body may produce outcomes that are poor due to these limitations.

== Criticism ==
Nearly all AK tests are subjective, relying solely on practitioner assessment of muscle response. Specifically, some studies have shown test-retest reliability, inter-tester reliability, and accuracy to have no better than chance correlations. Some skeptics have argued that there is no scientific understanding of the proposed underlying theory of a viscerosomatic relationship, and the efficacy of the modality is unestablished in some cases and doubtful in others. Skeptics have also dismissed AK as "quackery", "magical thinking", and a misinterpretation of the ideomotor effect. It has also been criticized on theoretical and empirical grounds, and characterized as pseudoscience. With only anecdotal accounts claiming to provide positive evidence for the efficacy of the practice, a review of peer-reviewed studies concluded that the "evidence to date does not support the use of [AK] for the diagnosis of organic disease or pre/subclinical conditions."

== Position statements ==
=== Allergy diagnosis ===
In the United States, the American Academy of Allergy, Asthma and Immunology and the National Institute of Allergy and Infectious Diseases have both advised that applied kinesiology should not be used in the diagnosis of allergies. The European Academy of Allergology and Clinical Immunology, the National Institute for Clinical Excellence of the UK, the Australasian Society of Clinical Immunology and Allergy and the Allergy Society of South Africa have also issued similar advice. The World Allergy Organization does not have a formal position on applied kinesiology, but in educational materials from its Global Resources In Allergy program, it lists applied kinesiology as an unproven test and describes it as useless. In 1998, a small pilot study published in the International Journal of Neuroscience showed a correlation between applied kinesiology muscle testings and serum immunoglobulin levels for food allergies. In it, 19 of 21 (90.5%) suspected food allergies diagnosed by applied kinesiology were confirmed by serum immunoglobulin tests. A follow-up review published in 2005 in the Current Opinion of Allergy and Clinical Immunology concluded applied kinesiology had no proven basis for diagnosis.

=== American Chiropractic Association ===
According to the American Chiropractic Association, in 2003, applied kinesiology was the 10th most frequently used chiropractic technique in the United States, with 37.6% of chiropractors employing this method and 12.9% of patients being treated with it. They describe AK as follows:

This is an approach to chiropractic treatment in which several specific procedures may be combined. Diversified/manipulative adjusting techniques may be used with nutritional interventions, together with light massage of various points referred to as neurolymphatic and neurovascular points. Clinical decision-making is often based on testing and evaluating muscle strength.

=== Danish Chiropractic Association ===
According to a March 26, 1998, letter from the DKF (Dansk Kiropraktor Forening – Danish Chiropractic Association), following public complaints from patients receiving homeopathic care and/or AK instead of standard (DKF-defined) chiropractic care, the DKF has determined that applied kinesiology is not a form of chiropractic care and must not be presented to the public as such. AK and homeopathy can continue to be practiced by chiropractors as long as it is noted to be alternative and adjunctive to chiropractic care and is not performed in a chiropractic clinic. Chiropractors may not infer or imply that the Danish chiropractic profession endorses AK to be legitimate or effective, nor may the word/title chiropractic/chiropractor be used or associated with the practice of AK.

== See also ==
- Ideomotor effect
- List of ineffective cancer treatments
- List of topics characterized as pseudoscience
- Nambudripad Allergy Elimination Technique
- Observer-expectancy effect
- Facilitated Communication
