= Mark Gillman =

South African neuroscientist and medical consultant

Mark A. Gillman
- Born: 1943 (age 82–83)
- Citizenship: South Africa
- Education: Wits University; Potchefstroom University
- Occupations: Professor; Neuroscientist; Brain Researcher
- Years active: 1980–present
- Website: www.ourcomplexbrain.com

Mark A. Gillman is a South African scholar, neuroscientist, medical consultant and author. He is Emeritus CEO of the S.A. Brain Research Institute and an adviser on substance abuse for Governments in South Africa, the USA, China, and Israel.

Gillman is known primarily for his research on conscious sedation with nitrous oxide/oxygen.

== Early life and education ==
Gillman pursued his bachelor’s degree in dental science from Wits University. He completed his Doctorate in Pharmacology at the Potchefstroom University.

== Career ==
Gillman was the CEO of the S.A. Brain Research Institute from 1982 to 2013, when he retired. He was also an adviser on substance abuse to Governments in South Africa, the USA, China, and Israel.

Over the years, Gillman has published over 300 papers along with five full-length books and a best-selling electronic presentation-textbook on the technique of conscious sedation with nitrous oxide.

As a renowned scholar, Gillman has lectured at several institutions such as the University of Witwatersrand, Medunsa, Hadassah Medical Schools in Jerusalem and Albert Einstein University Medical School in New York. He has addressed over 250 academic and lay audiences on conscious sedation with nitrous oxide and stress management both locally and internationally.

Gillman has been featured in several media outlets, news channels, and such as BBC, and academic journals like Lancet, BMJ, International Journal of Neuroscience, Biological Psychiatry, and others.

Gillman, along with his colleagues at the S.A. Brain Research Institute, discovered the new principle of biology called Gaseous neurotransmission.

He was also an integral member of the team that first proved the first biological link in continuum linking pain and pleasure that was first postulated by Aristotle, followed by Descartes and Spinoza.

Gillman also led a team that helped to uncover endorphin links to human sexual response, Anorexia nervosa, Tourette syndrome, and a treatment for substance abuse with nitrous oxide sedation used in South Africa and Scandinavia.

Gillman, along with Lichtigfeld, also discovered a new treatment for substance abuse with N2O sedation that was first used in SABRI and later in Europe, the USA, and China.

== Books ==
- Haynes C, Gillman MA (1992) Death the Last Great Adventure. Bizbee, U.S.A: Nomad Press.
- Gillman, Mark. A (1996). Envy As a Retarding Force in Science (Avebury Series in the Philosophy of Science). Avebury. ISBN 978-1859723975.
- Gillman MA (1996) Envy as a retarding force in science. U.K. Aldershot: Avebury.Mark. A, Gillman (1996). Envy As a Retarding Force in Science (Avebury Series in the Philosophy of Science). Avebury. ISBN 1859723977.
- Gillman MA (2004) Psychotropic Analgesic Nitrous Oxide (PAN) Sedation 1st Edition – Textbook (in CD form).
- Gillman MA (2006) Psychotropic Analgesic Nitrous Oxide (PAN) Sedation 2nd Edition – Textbook (in CD form). Johannesburg: Cerebrum Publishers.
- Gillman MA (2008) Psychotropic Analgesic Nitrous Oxide (PAN) Sedation 3rd Edition – Textbook (in CD form). Johannesburg: Cerebrum Publishers.
- Gillman MA (2019) Psychotropic Analgesic Nitrous Oxide (PAN) Sedation 4th Edition – Textbook (in CD form). USA|: Udemy.com
- Gillman MA (2010) Using Nitrous Oxide/Oxygen (PAN) sedation for treating nicotine dependence: A manual for Health Professionals. Johannesburg: Cerebrum Publishers.
- Gillman MA (2012) Nitrous oxide and neurotransmission. New York: Novo Science.
- Gillman MA (2018) How the brain controls all pleasures including sex, food, drugs, rock ‘n roll and others.Gillman, Mark. A (2018). How the brain controls all pleasures including sex, food, drugs, rock 'n roll and others: A scientific guide to help ourselves. Cerebrum Publishers.
- Gillman MA, Lichtigfeld FJ (1980) Nitrous oxide: treatment of withdrawal symptoms. Lancet 2: 803.
- Gillman MA, Kok L, Lichtigfeld FJ (1980) Paradoxical effect of naloxone on nitrous oxide analgesia in man. Eur J Pharmacol 61: 175–177.
- Gillman MA, Lichtigfeld FJ (1981) A comparison of the effect of morphine sulphate and nitrous oxide analgesia on chronic pain states in man. J Neurol Sci 45: 41–45.
- Sandyk R, Gillman MA (1986) The opioid system in the restless legs and nocturnal myoclonus syndromes. Sleep 9: 370–371.
- Gillman MA, Sandyk R (1984) Hemifacial spasm – successful treatment with Baclofen. S Afr Med J 65: 502.
- Gillman MA (1984) The hypertensive response to naloxone – A commentary. S Afr Med J 66: 551–552.
- Sandyk R, Gillman MA (1984) Motor dysfunction following chronic exposure to a fluoroalkane solvent mixture containing nitromethane. Eur Neurol 23: 479–480.
- Gillman MA, Lichtigfeld FJ, Young T (2008) Psychotropic analgesic nitrous oxide for alcoholic withdrawal states. (Review). The Cochrane Library, Issue 4.
- Gillman MA (2012) Psychotropic Analgesic Nitrous Oxide (PAN) also an opioid: Beneficial action in substance abuse. Front Psychiatry.
- Gillman MA (2012) Comment on: Opinion – Academia suppresses creativity. The Scientist.
- Gillman MA (2019) Early history and pioneers of procedural sedation and analgesia. Int J Anesthesiol Res 7: 1–5.
- Gillman MA (2019) Words of caution on using fixed 50% concentrations of nitrous oxide in psychiatry. J Clin Psychopharmacol 39(4): 421–422. https://doi.org/10.1097/jcp.0000000000001067
- Gillman MA (2019) Mini-review: A brief history of nitrous oxide (N₂O) use in neuropsychiatry. Curr Drug Res Rev 11(1): 12–20. https://doi.org/10.2174/1874473711666181008163107
- Gillman MA (2020) Dual opioid systems: A simpler explanation for naltrexone efficacy in fibromyalgia. Oxford Pain Medicine. https://doi.org/10.1093/pm/pnaa264
- Gillman MA (2021) The opioid properties of ketamine and nitrous oxide contribute to their antidepressant actions. Int J Neuropsychopharmacol 24(10): 892–893. https://doi.org/10.1093/ijnp/pyab045
- Gillman MA (2022) What is better for psychiatry: Titrated or fixed concentrations of nitrous oxide? Front Psychiatry 13: 773190. https://doi.org/10.3389/fpsyt.2022.773190
- Gillman MA (2023) Why ignore the opioid properties of nitrous oxide and ketamine when working on their antidepressant/psychotropic actions? Curr Drug Res Rev. https://doi.org/10.2174/2589977515666230330122010
- Gillman MA (2024) Study of antidepressant actions of subanesthetic nitrous oxide: Importance of adequate blinding and opioid receptors. Biol Psychiatry Glob Open Sci 4(4): 100331. https://doi.org/10.1016/j.bpsgos.2024.100331
