= Jilly Juice =

Fermented drink and quack remedy

Jilly Juice is a quack medicine in the form of a fermented drink that is falsely claimed by proponents to be able to cure an assortment of health conditions, including cancer and autism spectrum disorders, as well as regenerate missing limbs, reverse or slow down the effects of aging, and to "cure homosexuality". No studies have proven any of these statements, nor has the Food and Drug Administration (FDA) approved the recipe. The juice, composed of water, salt, and fermented cabbage or kale, is falsely claimed to expunge Candida (a yeast) and parasitic worms. Scientific evidence has shown that this treatment is not only ineffective, but is also toxic with potentially deadly adverse effects.

Jilly Juice was conceived by Jillian Mai Thi Epperly, who has no medical or scientific background. She has garnered media scrutiny for her baseless claims that Jilly Juice can help treat medical conditions, and petitions and other efforts have been made to ban the product and its promotion from social media. Followers of Epperly have been dubbed members of a "poop cult", and by 2017, had formed a now-defunct Facebook group made up of over 58,000 members. In 2018, the Federal Trade Commission (FTC) warned Epperly that it is against the law to advertise a product's health benefits without proper scientific support.

== Overview ==
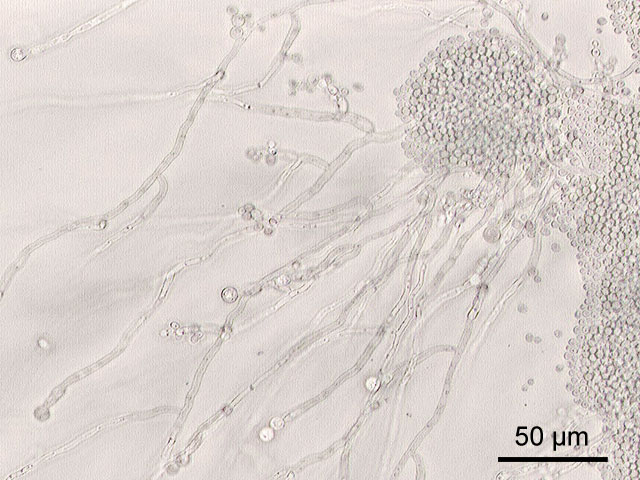
Proponents of Jilly Juice have falsely claimed that the drink is able to rid the body of Candida, which they believe is responsible for an assortment of unrelated medical conditions.

Jilly Juice consists solely of water, salt, and room temperature fermented cabbage or kale. According to proponents, the recipe for Jilly Juice includes two cups of water, a tablespoon of pink or sea salt, and two cups of cabbage or kale. The recipe calls for the ingredients to then be thoroughly puréed in a blender, poured into a glass jar, covered with cheesecloth, and left to ferment at room temperature for three days. Jillian Mai Thi Epperly, the creator of Jilly Juice, has claimed that salt is a "positive element" for the immune system, and that cabbage contains important probiotics and nutrients. She has recommended that individuals start consuming two cups of Jilly Juice per day, and then gradually increase consumption of it to up to 16 cups a day.

Proponents of Jilly Juice have claimed that a variety of illnesses and conditions are the result of Candida, a yeast which they claim attracts parasites in one's body. According to Epperly, an abundance of Candida in the body can cause harmful bacteria to multiply, create holes in the intestine, and allow toxins from food to enter one's bloodstream—she refers to this process as "leaky gut syndrome", or increased intestinal permeability. Epperly recommends a restricted diet supplemented by consuming large quantities of Jilly Juice, which supposedly removes Candida and parasites from one's body by inducing diarrhea (these bouts of diarrhea have been referred to by Jilly Juice advocates as "waterfalls").

Along with supposedly expunging Candida and parasites from one's body, Jilly Juice has been claimed to be able to "cure" autism, cancer, and psoriasis, as well as regenerate missing limbs, impede or reverse the effects of aging, and "cure" homosexuality.

== Efficacy and toxicity ==
Drinking Jilly Juice is wholly ineffective in treating any ailment, and can cause extreme dehydration and potentially fatal hypernatremia (salt intoxication). Joseph A. Schwarcz, director of McGill University's Office for Science and Society, has noted that the drink's dangerously high salt concentration can lead to hypertension. Poor fermentation of the drink could also lead to ill effects. David Seres, director of medical nutrition at Columbia University Medical Center, has called the claims of Jilly Juice proponents "absolutely dangerous nonsense".

In 2018, the Federal Trade Commission (FTC) warned Epperly about claims made regarding Jilly Juice in a letter that stated: "It is against the law to make health claims, whether directly or indirectly, through advertising or other means, without adequate scientific support at the time the claims are made, or to exaggerate the benefits of products or services you are promoting".

== History ==
=== Origins ===
Jillian Mai Thi Epperly, the creator of Jilly Juice, was born in Vietnam. She moved to the United States in May 1975 before the age of two, where she was adopted by American parents. Her father worked in biotechnology, which she claims helped her to realize that the pharmaceutical industry is working with doctors to keep consumers addicted to medication. She met her husband online and moved to Ohio to live with him. She developed premenstrual dysphoric disorder (PMDD), and after being exposed to various conspiracy theories such as the anti-vaccination movement and the chemtrail conspiracy theory, she sought out alternative medicine to treat her PMDD.

Epperly claimed that in her online research of various diseases, she discovered that Candida or other fungi were "always a factor". She therefore concluded that Candida was responsible for a large number of diseases. Epperly began trying recipes for kombucha and pickles before deciding on fermented cabbage with a significant salt content. The result was a room temperature brew of water, salt, and fermented cabbage or kale. Epperly claims this mixture can treat a number of illnesses and conditions and has marketed it as "Jilly Juice".

=== Spread ===
Epperly began making Jilly Juice with cabbage and kale in October 2016, and by January 2017, she was posting videos related to the drink on her personal Facebook page. The videos garnered a following, leading to the creation of a Facebook group known as "Exposing the Lies Candida: Weaponized Fungus Mainstreaming Mutancy". Over the next few months, the group grew to include thousands of members. In the Facebook group, members would often post images of their bowel movements, comments about supposed parasites visible in said bowel movements, and videos of themselves drinking Jilly Juice, preparing Jilly Juice as an enema, or giving Jilly Juice orally to young children and infants.

In February 2017, after receiving backlash from groups opposed to the promotion and consumption of Jilly Juice, Epperly launched a website, Jillyjuice.com, and removed the Facebook group from public view. At its peak, the Facebook group had amassed over 58,000 members. Content on Jillyjuice.com, which includes private forums, can be accessed by paying $30 annually or $5 monthly. Epperly has also provided private phone consultations for $70 an hour.

In May 2018, Epperly appeared on the American talk show Dr. Phil. The show's host, Phil McGraw, called Epperly's claims regarding Jilly Juice "outrageous."

=== Death of Bruce Wilmot ===
In the summer of 2017, Bruce Wilmot, who was diagnosed with metastatic pancreatic cancer, began taking Jilly Juice. Wilmot's daughter Taylor described him as "emaciated", and stated that he "was drinking so much of it, he was basically starving himself. It was all coming out as diarrhea."

On July 20, 2017, about a month after he began drinking Jilly Juice, Bruce Wilmot died. Epperly responded to his death in a video by saying that Wilmot did not consume enough Jilly Juice, stating that he "really should have kept going", and that his medications, his consumption of pineapple juice, or the medical industry may have contributed to his death. Epperly later wrote that she "can't be held accountable" for deaths resulting from her product, and that "correlation does not mean causation."

== Backlash ==
After Epperly's Facebook group grew in popularity, several other Facebook groups were created which opposed her and her followers' claims regarding Jilly Juice. A movement of Jilly Juice opponents, which has been described as "anti-juice", "anti-Jillian", and "anti-Epperly", has itself accrued thousands of adherents. Petitions on Change.org calling for Epperly and Jilly Juice to be banned from social media have also been created, and anti-Epperly advocates have reported her false health claims to the FDA, the FTC, the State Medical Board of Ohio, and the Ohio Attorney General's Office.

== See also ==
- Detoxification (alternative medicine)
- Hypernatremia
- James Morison (physician), who promoted strong laxatives as a cure-all during the 1800s
- Rope worms
