= Miracle Mineral Supplement =

Industrial bleach illegally marketed as a cure for various illnesses

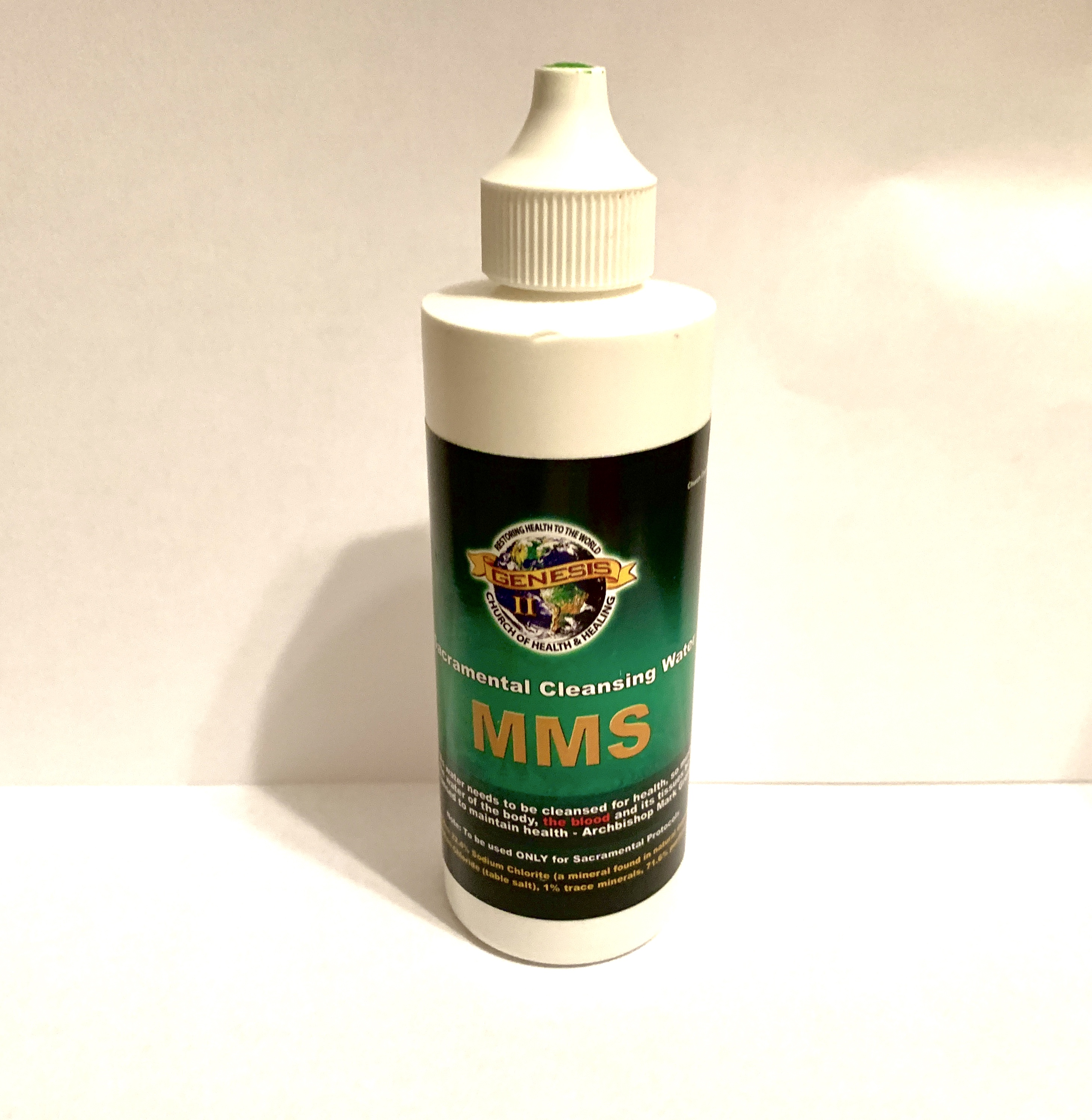
- Claims: Internal use of industrial bleaching agent chlorine dioxide will cure most diseases.
- Original proponents: Jim Humble

Miracle Mineral Supplement, often referred to as Miracle Mineral Solution, Master Mineral Solution, MMS or the CD protocol, is a branded name for an aqueous solution of chlorine dioxide, an industrial bleaching agent, that has been falsely promoted as a cure for illnesses including HIV, cancer and the common cold. It is made by mixing aqueous sodium chlorite with an acid (such as the juices of citrus fruits or vinegar). This produces chlorine dioxide, a toxic chemical that can cause nausea, vomiting, diarrhea, and life-threatening low blood pressure due to dehydration.

Sodium chlorite, the main precursor to chlorine dioxide, is itself toxic if ingested. It causes acute kidney failure in high doses. Lower doses (~1 gram) can be expected to cause nausea, vomiting, inflammation of the intestines (producing so-called "rope worms") and even life-threatening reactions in persons with glucose-6-phosphate dehydrogenase deficiency.

The United States Environmental Protection Agency has set a maximum level of 0.8 mg/L for chlorine dioxide in drinking water. Naren Gunja, director of the New South Wales, Australia Poisons Information Centre, has stated that using the product is "a bit like drinking concentrated bleach" and that users have displayed symptoms consistent with corrosive injuries, such as vomiting, stomach pains, and diarrhea.

The name was coined by former Scientologist Jim Humble in his 2006 self-published book, The Miracle Mineral Solution of the 21st Century. Humble claims that the chemical can cure HIV, malaria, hepatitis viruses, the H1N1 flu virus, common colds, autism, acne, cancer and other illnesses. There have been no clinical trials to test these claims, and they come only from anecdotal reports and Humble's book. In January 2010, The Sydney Morning Herald reported that one vendor admitted that they do not repeat any of Humble's claims in writing to circumvent regulations against using it as a medicine. Sellers sometimes describe MMS as a water purifier to circumvent medical regulations. The International Federation of Red Cross and Red Crescent Societies rejected "in the strongest terms" reports by promoters of MMS that they had used the product to fight malaria. In 2016, Humble said that MMS "cures nothing". In August 2019, the Food and Drug Administration repeated a 2010 warning against using MMS products, describing it as "the same as drinking bleach".

== Safety and legal issues ==
The Guardian described MMS as "extremely nasty stuff, and the medical advice given is that anyone who has this product should stop using it immediately and throw it away. In Canada it was banned after causing a life-threatening reaction." In August 2009, a Mexican woman travelling with her American husband on a yacht in Vanuatu took MMS to supposedly prevent malaria. She fell ill within 15 minutes, and died within 12 hours. The island nation's public prosecutor, Kayleen Tavoa, did not press any charges as there were no specific laws banning the importation of MMS, but advised, "While every case is assessed on its own merits, I advise that any person who misuses MMS in Vanuatu in the future would be likely to face prosecution for potentially serious criminal offences. No person should ever give MMS to another person to drink without advising them of what it is they are drinking and of the serious risks to health that may arise if they decide to drink the mixture."

In 2008, a 60-year-old Canadian man was hospitalized after a life-threatening response to MMS. Following a May 2010 advisory which indicated that MMS exceeds tolerable levels of sodium chlorite by a factor of 200, a Calgary-based supplier briefly stopped distribution. A February 2012 warning, which resulted in one website shutting down, advised: "There are no therapeutic products containing sodium chlorite authorized for oral consumption by humans in Canada." In the UK, the Food Standards Agency released a warning, following the initial warnings from Health Canada and the U.S. Food and Drug Administration, stating that "MMS is a 28% sodium chlorite solution which is equivalent to industrial-strength bleach. When taken as directed it could cause severe nausea, vomiting and diarrhoea, potentially leading to dehydration and reduced blood pressure. If the solution is diluted less than instructed, it could cause damage to the gut and red blood cells, potentially resulting in respiratory failure." More dilute versions have potential to do harm, although it is less likely. The Food Standards Agency has since reiterated their warning on MMS and extended it to include CDS.

Sellers attribute the vomiting, nausea, and diarrhea to the product working, but it is actually the product's toxicity.

In December 2009, an alert was issued by the Belgian Poison Control Centre to the European Association of Poisons Centres and Clinical Toxicologists. In response, an evaluation was performed by the French Comité de Coordination de Toxicovigilance in March 2010, warning about dose-dependent irritation and possible toxic effects. They also warned that patients affected by serious diseases could be tempted to stop their treatments in favour of this fraudulent treatment.

A similar notice was released in July 2010 by the U.S. Food and Drug Administration warning that MMS, which is prepared by mixing sodium chlorite solution with an acid (such as the juice of citrus fruits), produces chlorine dioxide, "a potent bleach used for stripping textiles and industrial water treatment." Because of reports including severe nausea, vomiting, and dangerously low blood pressure as a result of dehydration following consuming MMS, the FDA has advised consumers to stop using the product and dispose of it immediately. The FDA released another warning in August 2019, saying that it has continued to receive reports of illness caused by consuming MMS.

MMS is not approved for the treatment of any disease and, according to the United States Environmental Protection Agency, chronic exposure to small doses of chlorine dioxide could cause reproductive and neurodevelopmental damage. While studies of chlorine dioxide effects in humans are rare, studies on animal subjects are more common; chlorine dioxide has been shown to impair thyroid function and reduce CD4^{+} helper T cell count in grivet monkeys after 6 months. A study found reduced red blood cell count in rats exposed to 100 mg/L of chlorine dioxide concentration in their drinking water, after 3 months. The United States Department of Labor restricts occupational exposure through inhalation of chlorine dioxide to 0.1 ppm since concentrations at 10 ppm resulted in death in rats after 10 days, and a worker accidentally exposed to 19 ppm died. According to the same organization, "chlorine dioxide is a severe respiratory and eye irritant in humans".

=== COVID-19 ===
During the COVID-19 pandemic many previous promoters of MMS for other diseases, such as QAnon proponent Jordan Sather and the Genesis II Church of Health and Healing, began touting it as a cure for COVID-19. However, the claim that MMS can cure COVID-19, or any other disease, is not based on any scientific evidence. The office of the United States Attorney for the Southern District of Florida filed for and received a preliminary injunction against its sale by another branch of the church which was using anonymous testimonials and appealing to conspiracy theories to explicitly market MMS as a cure for COVID-19. That July, the court issued orders to shut down all websites selling MMS, to prevent the church from creating new websites, and to confiscate all materials used to make MMS. Multiple agencies were involved in the seizure of 50 gallons of muriatic (hydrochloric) acid, 8,300 pounds of sodium chlorite, and 22 gallons of finished product. The church was also instructed to notify customers that the product distribution had been illegal. Mark Grenon and his sons, Jonathan Grenon, Jordan Grenon, and Joseph Grenon were charged with conspiracy to defraud the United States, conspiracy to violate the Federal Food, Drug, and Cosmetic Act, and criminal contempt. Mark and Joseph Grenon were arrested in Colombia in August 2020 and were extradited to the United States. On 21 July 2023, they were found guilty of defrauding the United States, distributing an unapproved drug, and distributing a misbranded drug. In October 2023, Mark and Joseph Grenon received sentences of 60 months, and Jonathan and Jordan Grenon were also convicted of contempt of court and received 151 months.

==== Bolivia ====
In Bolivia, officials in Cochabamba promoted MMS as a cure for COVID-19 and the Congress passed a bill to authorise the "manufacture, marketing, supply and use of chlorine dioxide solution for the prevention and treatment of coronavirus". At least 15 people were poisoned as a result.

== Investigations ==
In 2015, BBC London conducted an undercover investigation into MMS, with a reporter posing as a family member of a person with autism. The BBC reporter was sold two bottles containing sodium chlorite and hydrochloric acid by a self-styled "reverend" Leon Edwards linked to the Genesis II Church in the United States. Edwards told the reporter that the solutions would cure nearly all illnesses and conditions, including cancer, HIV, malaria, autism and Alzheimer's disease. He recommended 27 drops per day for a baby. Laboratory analysis later showed that the concentration of both bottled solutions was far stronger than advertised. Edwards told the reporter:

I put it in my eyes, my nose, my ears, bathe in it, drunk it, breathed it in my lungs. I got injected in my butt with it.

ABC News and KABC-TV investigated the MMS phenomenon in 2016, and uncovered an "underground network" centered around southern California which was promoting the substance as a cure for conditions including cancer, Parkinson's disease and childhood autism.

It was reported in January 2018 that at least six police forces had investigated the use of MMS in the UK, where it continues to be available. Spokespersons for the UK's Medicines and Healthcare products Regulatory Agency and the Food Standards Agency repeatedly warned of the dangers of using such a product.

As reported in The Guardian in 2019, Uganda's government is investigating the administration of MMS in the country.

In 2019, Spain's Attorney General started an investigation in which German citizen Andreas Kalcker was charged for crimes against public health, having as its origin a complaint filed in October 2018 by the Ministry of Health, which warned of the "publication and sale" through the Internet of sodium chlorite.

In the summer of 2019, the "Genesis II Church of Health and Healing" held seminars to promote MMS in Chile, Ecuador, South Africa and New Zealand. Another one was scheduled for New York State in the United States, coming a week after the FDA warned the population about the product.

== Judgments ==
Former Chicagoan Kerri Rivera, who now resides in Mexico, was required by the Illinois Attorney General to sign a document stating that she would no longer promote the use of toxic chlorine dioxide, or "CD", in the state of Illinois. The agreement, which Rivera signed, says, "Respondent [Rivera] makes unsubstantiated health and medical claims regarding the use of chlorine dioxide in the treatment of autism. In truth and fact, Respondent lacks competent and reliable scientific evidence to support her claims that chlorine dioxide can treat autism. Respondent's act of promoting unsubstantiated health and medical claims regarding the use of chlorine dioxide in the treatment of autism constitutes a violation of Section 2 of the Consumer Fraud Act." The agreement continued to bar Rivera from speaking at seminars and selling chlorine dioxide or similar substances for the treatment of autism. However, Rivera publicizes from a website promoting dangerous MMS enemas as an autism treatment, and claiming that the intestinal lining of children expels parasites ("rope worms") – a false concept. Attorney General Lisa Madigan described the case by saying, "You have a situation where there are people, complete quacks, that are out there promoting a very dangerous chemical being given to young children... Ingesting what amounts to a toxic chemical—bleach—is not going to cure your child." Rivera advocates treating infants and toddlers, as well as older children, with chlorine dioxide enemas, requiring that children also drink the solution and bathe in it. From Germany, Rivera promoted MMS to treat COVID-19.

MMS was a cure touted by an Australian couple targeting the Seattle area. They ran websites using fake testimonials, photographs, and Seattle addresses, to promote downloadable books touted as containing secret cures as well as selling bottles labeled "water purification drops" with a brand name of "MMS Professional". The Washington State Attorney General's Office filed suit, and in conjunction with the Australian Competition & Consumer Commission (ACCC), secured a settlement of more than US$40,000, roughly $25,000 for state legal fees and $14,000 to be divided among 200 consumers. In the ACCC legal action, the presiding judge described the cures as quackery and found the claims on the websites "false, misleading, or deceptive".

A woman from the city of Mackay in Australia, without qualifications to practice, charged up to A$2,000 to inject patients with MMS in her garage, which lacked proper facilities for sterilization, and went as far as advising a person to avoid chemotherapy while "dishonestly promoting its benefits with no scientific basis for her claims". The Queensland Office of Fair Trading handed down a court order prohibiting her from "making any claims she is able to treat, cure, or benefit any person suffering from cancer" and she was charged court costs of A$12,000.

On 28 May 2015, a US federal jury found Louis Daniel Smith guilty of conspiracy, smuggling, selling misbranded drugs, and defrauding the United States in relation to the sale of MMS. According to the evidence presented at trial, Smith created phony "water purification" and "wastewater treatment" businesses in order to obtain sodium chlorite and ship Miracle Mineral Supplement without being detected by the government. On 28 October 2015, Smith was sentenced to serve four years and three months in federal prison to be followed by three years of supervised release. Despite Smith's sentence, the Genesis II Church of Health & Healing continue to promote the sale and use of MMS in many countries including the US. In a Washington Post article Floyd Jerred, a bishop in the Genesis II Church of Health & Healing, was quoted as saying of MMS, "As long as I'm just telling you about it, it's just education," and of Smith's conviction, "And if they do lock me up, I know how to do out-of-body travel. I can go anywhere, see anything I want to see anyway."

In Ireland in 2016, Patrick Merlehan, listed as "bishop" on the Genesis II Church website, was convicted on two charges fined €4,000 in relation to manufacturing and supplying of MMS as an unauthorized medicine. His appeal was denied in 2018.

After a guilty plea to 17 of 29 counts related to the sale of MMS, a British Columbia court sentenced Stanley Nowak to six months' house arrest, followed by eighteen months' curfew, then two years' probation in 2018. It was the first conviction in Canada.

In May 2020, Australia's Therapeutic Goods Administration fined MMS Australia, a chapter of the Genesis II Church, A$151,000 for over multiple advertising offenses.

== Usage in Cameroon and Uganda ==
=== Cameroon ===
A since-retracted 2018 study by Enno Freye of the Heinrich Heine University in Düsseldorf, Germany, claimed that chlorine dioxide was tested on 500 malarial patients in Cameroon, and asserted that it was "a promising new approach in malaria treatment". As reported in May 2019, The Guardian newspaper contacted the university, and was told that the study had been reviewed and found to be "scientifically worthless, contradictory, and in part ethically problematic"; Freye was stripped of his title of Apl-Professor of the faculty on grounds that he had "severely damaged the respectability and trust this title requires", and was terminated from the university. In August 2019 the study was retracted by the journal which had published it because the editors concluded after a complaint and investigation revealed that the study had never actually been conducted.

=== Uganda ===
In May 2019, The Guardian reported that American pastor Robert Baldwin had "trained" around 1,200 clerics in Uganda to distribute MMS as a "miracle cure". Each cleric is estimated to administer MMS to around 50 churchgoers. Baldwin, aged 52 from New Jersey, has been importing in bulk sodium chlorite and citric acid, which are the components of MMS. Baldwin operates under 'Global Healing', the ministry he founded, which uses "the power of Almighty God ... to greatly reduce the loss of life". Baldwin offers smartphones to clerics as an incentive to spread the "miracle cure". The Guardian contacted Baldwin, who said: "We use natural healing therapies to help people—that's something Christians do." Baldwin hung up after The Guardian asked about the dosage of bleach being administered in Africa.

Fiona O'Leary, a campaigner against fake medicine, provided The Guardian with a purported call recording of Robert Baldwin where he said: "When you draw attention to MMS you run the risk of getting in trouble with the government or drug companies. You have to do it low key. That's why I set it up through the church ... America and Europe have much stricter laws so you are not as free to treat people because it is so controlled by the [American] FDA. That's why I work in developing countries ... Those people in poor countries they don't have the options that we have in the richer countries—they are much more open to receiving the blessings that God has given them." Additionally, Baldwin allegedly said: "I don't call it 'MMS', I call it 'healing water', to protect myself ... Facebook has algorithms that can recognize 'MMS'."

Sam Little partially funded Baldwin's network, telling The Guardian that MMS was "helping" the people of Uganda: "We've cured loads of people not just for malaria, cancer, HIV, all sorts of things." Little said that his interest in MMS came about when a family member of his was "cured of cancer with MMS ... I started researching online and saw more and more videos of people being cured. That's when I decided to test it myself on malaria and travelled to Africa." However, he also said: "It's not using people as guinea pigs for trials".

American conservative political activist Alan Keyes has actively promoted the use of MMS in Uganda.

== Argentina ==
MMS has also been promoted in the Spanish language. In 2019, Andreas Kalcker gave presentations in two hotels in Buenos Aires promoting a cure he calls "CDS" that is identical to MMS. The product was promoted in the Spanish language on social media platforms like Facebook, and was also sold online.

In August 2020, a five-year-old boy died in Argentina, "of multiple organ failure consistent with chlorine dioxide poisoning." The boy's parents believed that the treatment had the power to ward off COVID-19. An investigation was opened into the death of the child as well as additional deaths associated with the treatment. In March 2021, police conducted a raid into places where the chemical was being manufactured and sold, as well as additional raids in September.

In January 2021, a 92-year-old coronavirus patient died after a judge ordered a clinic to give the patient chlorine dioxide at the request of his family.

== See also ==
- List of unproven and disproven cancer treatments
- List of unproven methods against COVID-19
- Patent medicine
- Rhys Morgan, teenage blogger whose actions helped clamp down on illegal distribution
