= Andreas Kalcker =

German resident in Switzerland

Andreas Ludwig Kalcker is a German national residing in Switzerland who promotes the use of chlorine dioxide as an alternative medicine treatment he calls "CDS". Chlorine dioxide used in this manner is also promoted under the name Miracle Mineral Solution (MMS). Before moving to Switzerland, Kalcker lived in Spain for several years.

Both the Colegio Oficial de Médicos de Alicante (COMA) of Spain and the Food and Drug Administration (FDA) of the United States warn consumption of MMS can cause abdominal pain, nausea, vomiting, diarrhea, intoxication or kidney failure.

Despite a lack of evidence, Kalcker has advertised the product as a definitive cure for cancer, AIDS, autism, hepatitis, diabetes, arthritis and all kinds of diseases, as well as the perfect antioxidant, even though chlorine dioxide is an oxidizer and not an antioxidant. Kalcker has been investigated, sued and arrested for his unsubstantiated claims.

In 2010, Spanish Authorities banned MMS for human consumption, considering it to be a fraudulent treatment. It is only available for industrial use.

On 24 October 2012, Kalcker was invited to speak about his product at a conference, and was arrested in Ibiza by agents of the Spanish Civil Guard Anti-Drug and Organized Crime Team for violating Spanish public health protection laws for promoting sale of his fraudulent treatment.

In 2018, the Official College of Doctors of Alicante (COMA in Spanish) called for a boycott of a Kalcker event to promote MMS, warning of the danger of consuming the substance. COMA issued a statement that MMS "is nothing more than industrial bleach diluted to 28% and mixed with citric acid", whose ingestion can produce adverse effects. The event, planned to be held in San Juan, was cancelled by the hotel,

After Kalcker sued the president of the COMA for warning about the event, María Isabel Moya, the Provincial Court of Alicante ratified that there was no criminal infraction for her statements, considering that "the president acted in the exercise of her competences and in her duty to protect the health of the general public".

In 2019, the Spanish Attorney General started an investigation in which Kalcker was charged for crime against public health, having as its origin a complaint filed in October 2018 by the Ministry of Health, which warned of the "publication and sale" through the Internet of sodium chlorite.

In August 2020, a five year old boy died in Argentina, "of multiple organ failure consistent with chlorine dioxide poisoning." An investigation was opened into the death of the child as well as additional deaths associated with the treatment. Following a 7 month investigation by the Unidad Fiscal para la Investigación de Delitos contra el Medio Ambiente (UFIMA), Kalcker has been charged with "illegal practice of the medical profession and selling fake medicines."

In 2021 an Argentine lawyer filed a lawsuit against Kalcker following the death of a five-year-old boy in Neuquén Province who ingested chlorine dioxide, a chemical compound promoted by Kalcker as a cure for COVID-19. The lawyer filed the complaint before the Public Prosecutor's Office of Argentina for the commission of crimes against public health, arguing that the accused in a "completely fraudulent and illegal manner are selling the substance in question, putting in critical danger an innumerable number of Argentine compatriots".
