= Autodynamics =

Alternative to relativity

Autodynamics was a physics theory proposed by Ricardo Carezani (1921–2016) in the early 1940s as a replacement for Einstein's theories of special relativity and general relativity. Autodynamics never gained status as a viable alternative model within the physics community, and today is wholly rejected by mainstream science.

== Main tenets of autodynamics ==
The primary claim of autodynamics is that the equations of the Lorentz transformation are incorrectly formulated to describe relativistic effects, which would invalidate special relativity, general relativity, and Maxwell's equations. The effect of the revised equations proposed in autodynamics is to cause particle mass to decrease with particle velocity, being exchanged with kinetic energy (with mass being zero and kinetic energy being equal to the rest mass at c). This exchange between mass and energy is the proposed mechanism underlying most of the derived conclusions of autodynamics.

Ancillary predictions of autodynamics include:

- the nonexistence of the neutrino,
- the existence of additional particles that have not been observed by mainstream physicists (including the "picograviton" and the "electromuon"),
- the existence of additional decay modes for muons and interaction modes for energetic atomic nuclei.

== Status of autodynamics ==
Autodynamics is rejected by the mainstream scientific community. A 1999 article in the magazine Wired quotes H. Pierre Noyes, a professor at the Stanford Linear Accelerator Center, as stating, "autodynamics was disproved. Special relativity is correct" and noting that "mainstream physicists have considered autodynamics a crackpot theory for decades". Noyes was a researcher in an experiment attempting to compare the predictions of SR and AD, and concluded that the values calculated by SR were significantly closer to what was observed. Carezani later argued that the experiment was not relevant for comparing the two theories by pointing out that AD applies specifically to decay cases, yet the electrons in the Noyes experiment received energy from the external medium (klystron EM field). According to Lee Smolin, there has been "no serious attempt [by the autodynamics supporters] to make an argument or to discuss experimental data that refute their basic claims".

== See also ==
- List of topics characterized as pseudoscience
