= Pinnick–Lindgren oxidation =

Organic redox reaction of aldehydes

Pinnick oxidation
| Named after | Harold W. Pinnick |
| Reaction type | Organic redox reaction |

Pinnick–Lindgren oxidation (sometimes Pinnick oxidation or Lindgren oxidation or similar) is an organic reaction by which aldehydes can be oxidized into their corresponding carboxylic acids using sodium chlorite (NaClO_{2}) under mild acidic conditions. It was originally developed by Bengt O. Lindgren and Nilsson. The typical reaction conditions used today were developed by G. A. Kraus. H.W. Pinnick later demonstrated that these conditions could be applied to oxidize α,β-unsaturated aldehydes. There exist many different reactions to oxidize aldehydes, but only a few are amenable to a broad range of functional groups. The Pinnick oxidation has proven to be both tolerant of sensitive functionalities and capable of reacting with sterically hindered groups. This reaction is especially useful for oxidizing α,β-unsaturated aldehydes, and another one of its advantages is its relatively low cost.

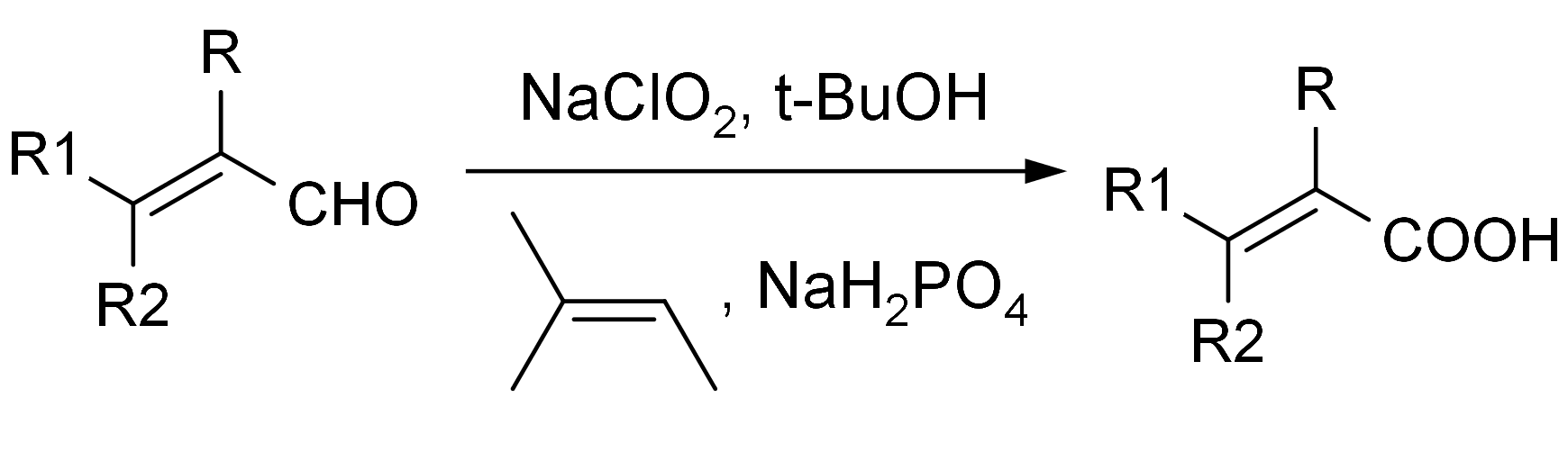
General reaction scheme for Pinnick oxidation

The oxidation takes place in water containing solvent mixtures under slightly acidic conditions (pH 3–5) with sodium chlorite as oxidizer. To avoid complicated oxidation reactions the hypochlorite, which is formed in the reaction, has to be removed from the reaction mixture by scavengers. In the original publication, sulfamic acid and resorcinol were used. George A. Kraus and co-workers were the first to use 2-methyl-2-butene as scavenger under buffered conditions for the oxidation of an aliphatic and an α,β-unsaturated aldehyde. Later hydrogen peroxide also proved to work to remove the hypochlorite.

== Mechanism ==
The proposed reaction mechanism involves chlorous acid as the active oxidant, which is formed under acidic conditions from chlorite.

ClO_{2}^{−} + H_{2}PO_{4}^{−} ⇌ HClO_{2} + HPO_{4}^{2−}

First, the chlorous acid adds to the aldehyde. Then resulting structure undergoes a pericyclic fragmentation in which the aldehyde hydrogen is transferred to an oxygen on the chlorine, with the chlorine group released as hypochlorous acid (HOCl).

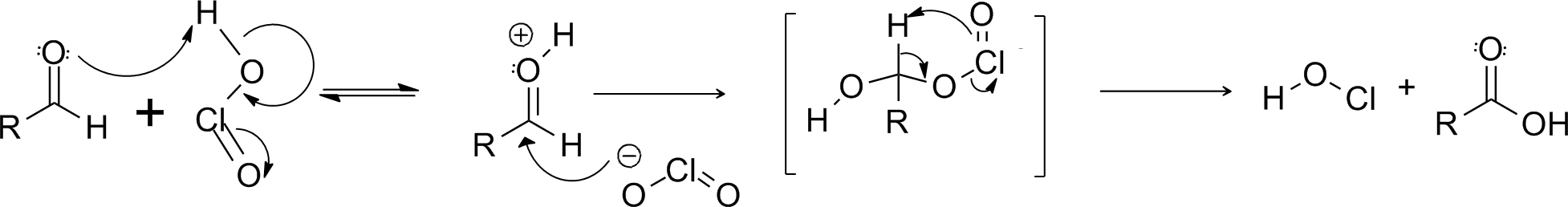
Curved arrow mechanism for generic Pinnick oxidation.

=== Side reactions and scavengers ===
The HOCl byproduct, itself a reactive oxidizing agent, can be a problem in several ways. It can destroy the NaClO_{2} reactant:

HOCl + 2ClO_{2}^{−} → 2ClO_{2} + Cl^{−} + OH^{−}

making it unavailable for the desired reaction. It can also cause other undesired side reactions with the organic materials. For example, HOCl can react with double bonds in the organic reactant or product via a halohydrin formation reaction.

To prevent interference from HOCl, a scavenger is usually added to the reaction to consume the HOCl as it is formed. For example, one can take advantage of the propensity of HOCl to undergo this addition reaction by adding a sacrificial alkene-containing chemical to the reaction mixture. This alternate substrate reacts with the HOCl, preventing the HOCl from undergoing reactions that interfere with the Pinnick reaction itself. 2-Methyl-2-butene is often used in this context:

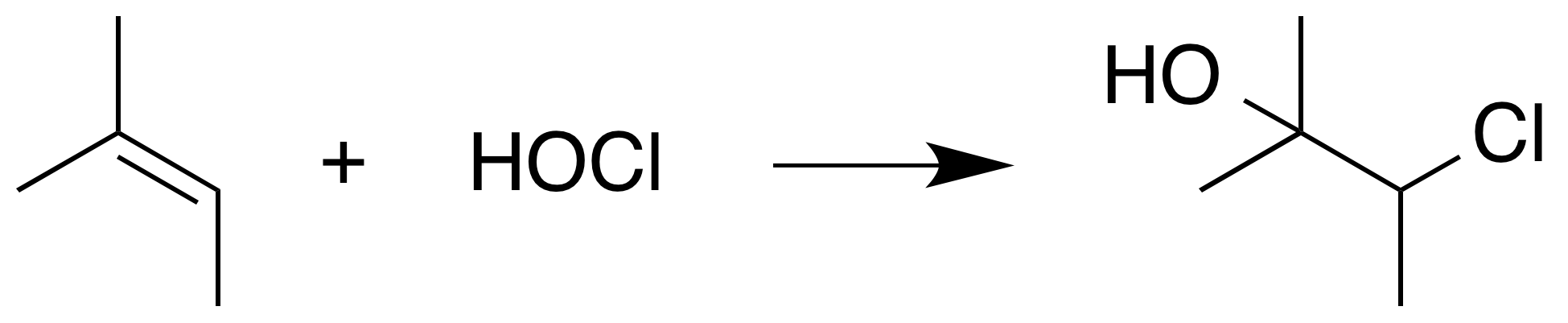

Resorcinol and sulfamic acid are also common scavenger reagents.

Hydrogen peroxide (H_{2}O_{2}) can be used as HOCl scavenger whose byproducts do not interfere in the Pinnick oxidation reaction:

HOCl + H_{2}O_{2} → HCl + O_{2} + H_{2}O

In a weakly acidic condition, fairly concentrated (35%) H_{2}O_{2} solution undergoes a rapid oxidative reaction with no competitive reduction reaction of HClO_{2} to form HOCl.

HClO_{2} + H_{2}O_{2} → HOCl + O_{2} + H_{2}O

Chlorine dioxide reacts rapidly with H_{2}O_{2} to form chlorous acid.

2ClO_{2} + H_{2}O_{2} → 2HClO_{2} + O_{2}

Also the formation of oxygen gives good indication of the progress of the reaction. However, problems sometimes arise due to the formation of singlet oxygen in this reaction, which may oxidize organic materials (i.e. the Schenck ene reaction). DMSO has been used instead of H_{2}O_{2} to oxidize reactions that do not produce great yields using only H_{2}O_{2}. Mostly electron rich aldehydes fall under this category. (See Limitation below)

Also, solid-supported reagents such as phosphate-buffered silica gel supported by potassium permanganate and polymer-supported chlorite have been prepared and used to convert aldehydes to carboxylic acid without having to do conventional work-up procedures. The reaction involves the product to be trapped on silica gel as their potassium salts. Therefore, this procedure facilitates easy removal of neutral impurities by washing with organic solvents.

== Scope and limitations ==
The reaction is highly suited for substrates with many group functionalities. β-aryl-substituted α,β-unsaturated aldehydes works well with the reaction conditions. Triple bonds directly linked to aldehyde groups or in conjugation with other double bonds can also be subjected to the reaction. Hydroxides, epoxides, benzyl ethers, halides including iodides and even stannanes are quite stable in the reaction. The examples of the reactions shown below also show that the stereocenters of the α carbons remain intact while double bonds, especially trisubstituted double bonds do not undergo E/Z–isomerization in the reaction.

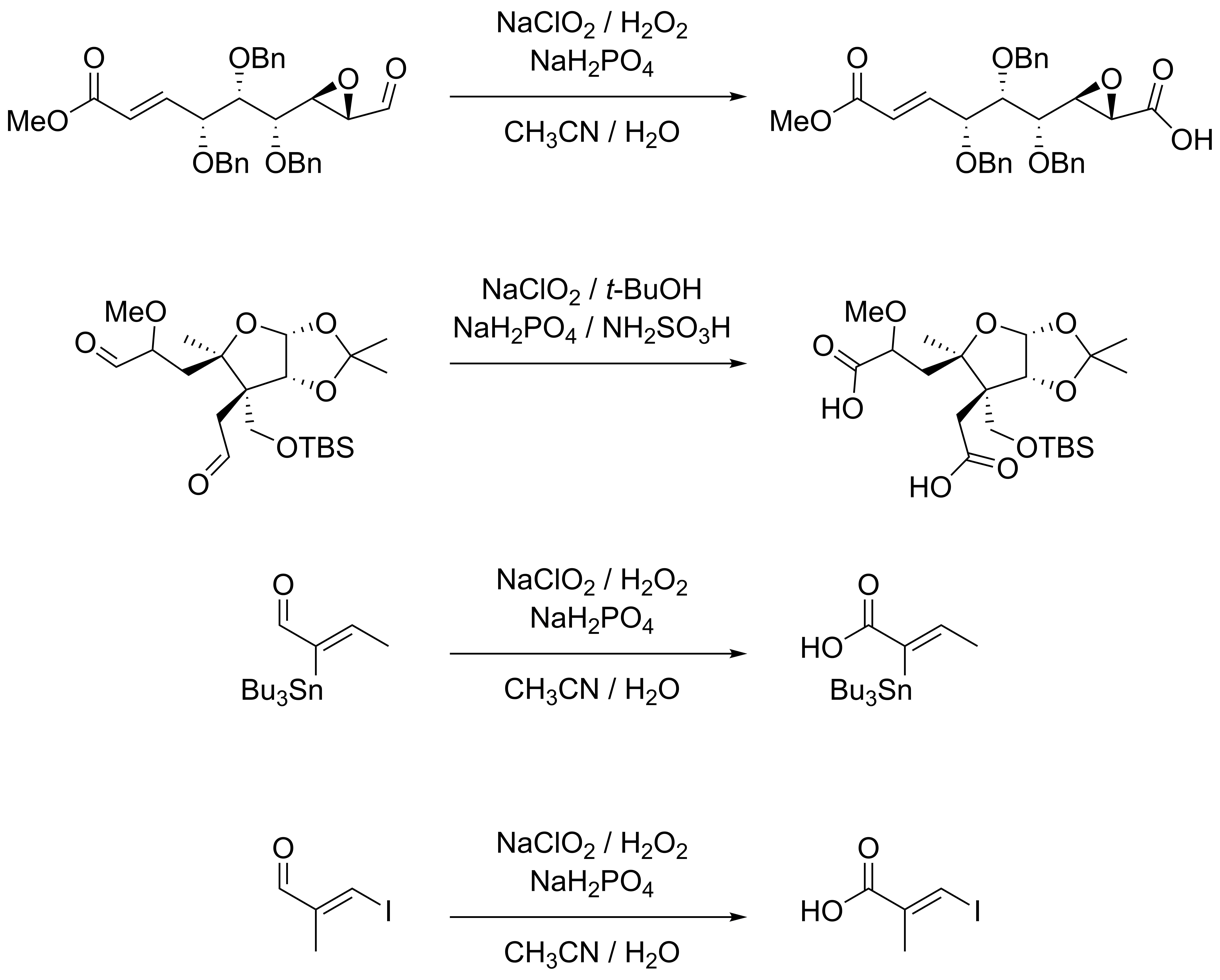
Scope

Lower yields are obtained for reactions involving aliphatic α,β-unsaturated and more hydrophilic aldehydes. Double bonds and electron-rich aldehyde substrates can lead to chlorination as an alternate reaction. The use of DMSO in these cases gives better yield. Unprotected aromatic amines and pyrroles are not well suited for the reactions either. In particular, chiral α-aminoaldehydes do not react well due to epimerization and because amino groups can be easily transformed to their corresponding N-oxides. Standard protective group approaches, such as the use of t-BOC, are a viable solution to these problems.

Thioethers are also highly susceptible to oxidation. For example, Pinnick oxidation of thioanisaldehyde gives a high yield of carboxylic acid products, but with concomitant conversion of the thioether to the sulfoxide or sulfone.

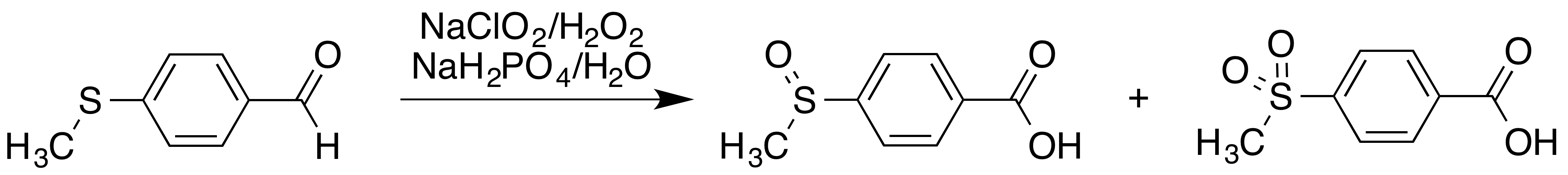

== See also ==
- Lindgren oxidation
