= Hexagonal water =

Term in marketing scam

Hexagonal water, also known as gel water, structured water, cluster water, H3O2 or H_{3}O_{2} is a term used in a marketing scam that claims the ability to create a certain configuration of water that is better for the body. The term hexagonal water refers to a cluster of water molecules forming a hexagonal shape that supposedly enhances nutrient absorption, removes metabolic wastes, and enhances cellular communication, among other things. The scam takes advantage of the consumer's limited knowledge of chemistry, physics, and physiology. Gel water is referenced in the version of the hoax in which animal fascia or plants are said to create or contain a "fourth phase" of water with an extra hydrogen and an extra oxygen, despite the reality that this compound is neither water, nor stable.

== Incompatibilities with science ==
The concept of hexagonal water clashes with several established scientific ideas. Although water clusters have been observed experimentally, they have a very short lifetime: the hydrogen bonds are continually breaking and reforming at timescales shorter than 200 femtoseconds. This contradicts the hexagonal water model's claim that the particular structure of water consumed is the same structure used by the body. Similarly, the hexagonal water model claims that this particular structure of water "resonates with energetic vibrations of the body to amplify life force". Although water molecules strongly absorb energy in the infrared range of the electromagnetic spectrum, there is no scientific evidence that supports the claim that hexagon-shaped water polymers would be created through bombardment of energy of these frequencies.

Proponents of the hexagonal water model claim that the measurable differences between commercially available "hexagonal water" products and tap water under ^{17}O nuclear magnetic resonance spectroscopy indicate hexagonal water's special properties. However, this technique shows no significant differences between the supposed "hexagonal water", ultrapure water, and human urine. The experimental observation of water clusters requires spectroscopic tools such as far-infrared (FIR) vibration-rotation-tunneling (VRT) spectroscopy (an infrared spectroscopy technique).

== See also ==
- Polywater
- List of topics characterized as pseudoscience
- Penta Water, another variation of "structured water"
- The dihydrogen monoxide parody, which takes advantage of scientific illiteracy in describing some alarming properties of water
