= Penta Water =

American bottled water brand

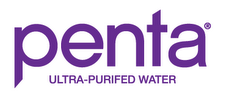
- Type: Bottled water
- Manufacturer: United Beverage
- Origin: United States
- Website: www.pentawater.com

Penta Water is a brand of bottled water produced by United Beverage, based in Southern California. Penta Water undergoes a patented process which the company claims to result in specific health benefits. These claims have been heavily contested by scientists and regulators and do not have any genuine scientific basis.

== History ==
Penta Water was created by Bill Holloway in Carlsbad, California. Holloway says that he was diagnosed with fibromyalgia which he contracted due to working with mercury at a previous job. His son, Mike Holloway, then came up with the formula for the highly purified water by accident, and the resulting water "caused him to feel better and to lead a relatively normal life". At this point he realized that he should manufacture and sell this water.

Southern California-based United Beverage acquired the patent for Penta Water in 2009, and is still manufacturing and distributing the water as of 2019.

== Claims ==
Founder Bill Holloway claimed that "the water formula actually saved his life". He also claimed to have thousands of written testimonials from people with such conditions as cancer, arthritis, cirrhosis, heart disease, and teenage acne who claim to receive relief from his purified water as it allegedly reduces swelling.

In a 2004 interview with Tom Morrow of The San Diego Union-Tribune, Holloway states "our water protects DNA. It acts as a sort of anti-aging process. Heck, it may even be the fountain of youth."

Press releases from March 2008 announced that Penta Water would be releasing a new study run by dermatologist Jean Krutmann and the Environmental Health Research Institute. This study allegedly demonstrated "that human skin cells cultured in Penta water had significantly less damage from ultraviolet radiation than skin cells cultured in plain water". The press releases claim that this suggests Penta Water may have anti-aging and antioxidant effects. Penta Water also claims to have commissioned UC Davis to continue this study into the hydration abilities and antioxidant effects of Penta Water.

== Legal challenge ==
A 2003 US class action lawsuit, led by San Diego lawyer Stephen Morris, against Penta Water on the grounds of false advertising and unfair business practice, resulted in the company no longer being allowed to claim the water has health benefits.

In response to the lawsuit, the makers of Penta said that scientists from UC San Diego as well as the Scripps Research Institute "had confirmed the health benefits of their water".

Morris said that he contacted one scientist who was listed as a collaborator on the study and "she told him she disagreed with the study's conclusions and wanted her name removed from it."

In 2016, San Diego news radio station KPBS contacted UC San Diego chemistry professor Andy Kummel, who coauthored the report on Penta Water's claims. They concluded that Penta Water's claims were "not only wrong, but absurd".

In March 2005 a public complaint was filed with the Advertising Standards Authority in the United Kingdom regarding a promotional leaflet on the qualities of Penta Water. The leaflet claimed that "it's no ordinary water" and that the water is "ultra-purified", "restructured", and can provide the consumer with something called "bio-hydration". The leaflet claimed this process, which was granted a patent for a 13 step water purification process by The US Patent Office, was proven at UC San Diego, Moscow University, and again proven by the General Physic Institute. The complaint alleged that the leaflet implied the product contained health benefits beyond those of plain water, and that it claimed water was "restructured", which the complainant did not believe was possible.

According to the Advertising Standards Authority,

The advertisers asserted that Penta was a new form of water that was restructured. They submitted research papers that they believed showed scientific evidence of restructuring and several works in preparation, including studies from UK universities, that they believed showed increased performance and recovery levels after exercise with Penta when compared with ordinary water. The advertisers argued that, because Penta could hydrate more efficiently than tap water, it was better for health; they said they had not, however, made any medicinal claims for the product.

Based on the scientific evidence presented to the Advertising Standards Authority they "concluded that the information submitted was not sufficient to prove Penta water had health benefits over and above those of ordinary water or was structured differently from ordinary water". Thus, the ASA "told the advertisers not to repeat claims that implied the product was chemically unique, had been restructured or molecularly redesigned, or hydrated cells and improved physical performance better than tap water.

In 2005 Ben Goldacre, investigating for his "Bad Science" column in The Guardian, examined Penta's website and found that Penta Water had many health claims and testimonials on their website. When he reached out to Penta for scientific evidence, he was told that there exists an in vitro study on liposomes with aquaporins in artificial membranes that demonstrates this water is absorbed faster, although this study was never produced.

Ben Goldacre received threatening messages from Penta Water in the form of a message to his Bad Science column that read "Sleep well tonight and think about how and why you tried to fuck us over and practice keeping one eye open". The company later apologized for this remark.

Penta Water claimed that seeds could germinate in half the time in Penta Water, compared to normal water. Because of this testable claim they were encouraged to attempt James Randi's million dollar challenge. Penta Water announced that they would accept the challenge. As they further discussed the terms for verification of the experiment, Penta Water declined to continue with the challenge, stating they did not have the appropriate resources at the time to provide someone to oversee the experiment.

== See also ==
- List of topics characterized as pseudoscience
- Hexagonal water aka "Structured Water"
