= Nambudripad's Allergy Elimination Techniques =

Form of alternative medicine

Alternative medicine
- Claims: To identify and treat allergies
- Related fields: Acupressure, Acupuncture, Chiropractic, Applied kinesiology
- Year proposed: 1983
- Original proponents: Devi Nambudripad
- See also: Applied kinesiology

Nambudripad's Allergy Elimination Techniques (NAET) is a form of alternative medicine which proponents claim can treat allergies and related disorders. The techniques were devised by Devi Nambudripad, a California-based chiropractor and acupuncturist, in 1983, drawing on a combination of ideas from applied kinesiology, acupuncture, acupressure, nutritional management, and chiropractic methods.

Clinical research has found no evidence supporting the accuracy of muscle testing to diagnose medical allergies. Supporters of the practice agree that mainstream science has not shown credible evidence for the effectiveness of this method.

== History ==
Devi Nambudripad was a student chiropractor and acupuncturist at the time she developed NAET. Whilst experiencing a reaction to eating carrots she attempted to overcome the reaction through a self-administered acupuncture treatment. After the treatment the reaction to eating carrots did not return. At the time of the acupuncture treatment, a remnant of carrot was on her skin, and Nambudripad concluded from this that the presence of a minute quantity of carrot during the acupuncture treatment was the key to the treatment. She then formulated a hypothesis that contact with a small amount of an allergen during an acupuncture or acupressure session can remove reactions to food and other substances.

NAET is promoted by her Nambudripad’s Allergy Research Foundation (NARF) which also publishes its own journal called The Journal of NAET, Energetics & Complementary Medicine.

She is licensed as a chiropractor and acupuncturist in California. She also identifies herself as an M.D.. Her website states that she received the Doctor of Medicine degree from University of Health Sciences Antigua (UHSA) in January 2002. The California Medical Board does not list an active license, and it does not recognize medical degrees from UHSA as valid, listing it as a "disapproved" school since 1995.

== Theory ==
NAET uses the term word allergy differently from medicine. Nambudripad claims that the central nervous system and associated sensory systems have the ability to detect the "electromagnetic signatures" of all molecules, with the central nervous system either reacting or not reacting to a particular substance. Reaction to a neutral substance is called a sensitivity. In medical science, the reaction may be so extreme as to be called an allergy. In NAET such reaction is said to manifest itself as an energy disturbance or blockage in the flow of life force qi along meridians. In stark contrast to the modern scientific understanding of allergies, Nambudripad characterizes an allergy as a condition caused by these "repulsive electromagnetic fields between an individual and the object (allergen)". Allergens may be any of a wide variety of substances, as well as more abstract notions such as emotions and colors. The cumulative effects of these energy disturbances are said to give rise to a variety of health disorders, with Nambudripad suggesting that "95 percent of human ailments arise from some sort of allergy". The theory of NAET proposes that these allergies can be eliminated by addressing the energy blockages through the use of acupuncture or acupressure. Some of these ideas and concepts are adopted from ancient Chinese medicine, which follows a different paradigm from that of modern medicine.

== Technique ==
NAET practitioners use a form of applied kinesiology called Neuromuscular Sensitivity Testing (NST or NST-NAET) to diagnose allergies by comparing the strength of a muscle in the presence and absence of a suspected allergen, although they recommend Ig-E allergy testing with a physician as well. Practitioners will then aim to remove energy blockages by having the patient hold a glass bottle containing the allergen whilst acupressure or acupuncture techniques are employed. After treatment, patients rest 20 minutes while continuing to hold the jar containing the allergen, after which time the patient will again be tested for a sensitivity reaction using the muscle strength test. If the NAET practitioner determines the sensitivity has cleared, the patient is advised to avoid the substance for the following 25 hours or more. Patients are invited to return for retesting with NAET between 25 hours and 7 days after the treatment.

== Evidence ==
Several reviews of the available evidence for various alternative techniques in allergy diagnosis have determined that applied kinesiology, the primary diagnostic technique in NAET, is ineffective at diagnosing allergies and advise against its use. Various medical associations also advise against its use, including the European Academy of Allergology and Clinical Immunology, the National Institute for Health and Clinical Excellence, the American Academy of Allergy, Asthma and Immunology, the National Institute of Allergy and Infectious Diseases, the Australasian Society of Clinical Immunology and Allergy, and the Allergy Society of South Africa.

Two medical review articles conclude that "NAET has to be the most unsubstantiated allergy treatment proposed to date" and that "there have been no studies supporting the use of these techniques". The Teuber and Porch-Curren review cautions that "there is the potential for an anaphylactic reaction if a patient with severe food allergies seeks such a therapy and tests themselves by oral challenge away from a physician's office after completing the NAET sessions successfully". The Australasian Society of Clinical Immunology and Allergy has advised against using NAET to treat allergies, criticizing its "lack of scientific rationale" and describing it as a "potentially dangerous technique".

In a critical appraisal of Nambudripad's techniques Stephen Barrett of Quackwatch writes:

NAET clashes with the concepts of anatomy, physiology, pathology, physics, and allergy accepted by the scientific community. The story of its "discovery" is highly implausible. Its core diagnostic approach – muscle testing for "allergies" – is senseless and is virtually certain to diagnose nonexistent problems. Its recommendations for dietary restrictions based on nonexistent food allergies are likely to place the patient at great risk for nutrient deficiency, and, in the case of children, at risk for social problems and the development of eating disorders.
