= Rope worms =

Dangerous pseudoscientific concept

"Rope worms" (or "ropeworms") is a pseudoscientific term for long thin pieces of damaged intestinal epithelium or other bowel content that have been misidentified as human parasitic worms. "Rope worms" were reported in 2013 in two self-published papers by Volinsky and Gubarev et al. that are not peer reviewed per the papers and which state that, "Stage 5 had 99% match to human mitochondria DNA." In fact, they are not actual parasites, but instead fragments of mucous membrane shed from the gut following the use of bleach enemas (usually marketed as Miracle Mineral Supplement) and other similarly ineffective and toxic cleanses, such as the essential oil enema described by Volinsky et al.

The phenomenon results from improper identification of intestinal artifacts expelled from the body. These "ropeworms" are often discussed, with images shared and claimed as evidence of successful detoxing, on autism forums and altmed Facebook groups, wherein various toxic and/or ineffective products are falsely claimed to cure autism and myriad other conditions and ailments. In one Facebook group, 8500 members have allegedly been charged $60 to join, half a million dollars combined, leading to questioning of the leaders' intentions.

Parents in these groups may be reluctant to take their children to their doctors, even when dangerous reactions to chlorine dioxide are apparent, such as vomiting, malaise, dehydration, and jaundice. Doctors and other mandatory reporters are generally required to report suspected child abuse (including the use of chlorine dioxide enemas) to child protective services.
