= Candida hypersensitivity =

Pseudoscientific syndrome related to yeast infections

- systemic candidiasis, chronic candidiasis

Pseudomedical diagnosis
- Risks: Nocebo

Candida hypersensitivity is a pseudoscientific syndrome promoted by William G. Crook, M.D. It is spuriously claimed that chronic yeast infections are responsible for many common disorders and non-specific symptoms including fatigue, weight gain, constipation, dizziness, muscle and joint pain, asthma, and others.

== Background ==
Candida albicans is a fungus that colonizes a large majority of the population (meaning it is present in the body but not causing an infection or any problems). Under certain conditions, however, it can cause an infection. The most common manifestations are thrush (a superficial Candida infection in the mouth) and vaginitis, also commonly referred to as a yeast infection. Several Candida species can also cause a serious infection known as invasive candidiasis, which can be systemic if blood borne (candidaemia). This is almost always restricted to those with compromised immune systems, such as patients undergoing chemotherapy or with advanced AIDS, or undergoing medical treatments.

== Symptoms ==
After reading publications by C. Orian Truss, M.D., Crook proposed the idea that a condition he termed systemic candidiasis, or Candida hypersensitivity, was responsible for a long list of common conditions and non-specific symptoms including fatigue, asthma, psoriasis, sexual dysfunction, and many others. The list of symptoms is similar to that of multiple chemical sensitivity. Many patients presenting with symptoms of environmental sensitivity claim to suffer from multiple "fashionable" syndromes.

== Criticism ==
By 2005, scientists were taking note of "a large pseudoscientific cult" that had developed around the topic of yeast infections, with claims that up to one in three people were affected by yeast-related illnesses including Candida hypersensitivity.

== Legal action ==
Some practitioners of alternative medicine have promoted dietary supplements as supposed cures for this non-existent illness, rendering themselves liable to prosecution. In 1990, alternative health vendor Nature's Way signed a FTC consent agreement not to misrepresent in advertising any self-diagnostic test concerning yeast conditions or to make any unsubstantiated representation concerning any food or supplement's ability to control yeast conditions, with a fine of US$30,000 payable to the National Institutes of Health for research in genuine candidiasis.

== See also ==
- List of topics characterized as pseudoscience
