= List of homeopathic preparations =

Substances used by homeopaths

The following substances have been commonly used in homeopathy. See Category:Homeopathic remedies for a list of other notable preparations.

| Homeopathic name | Substance | Common name |
|---|---|---|
| Aconite | Aconitum napellus | Monkshood, monk's blood, fuzi, wolf's bane |
| Aesculus hippocastanum | Aesculus hippocastanum | Horse-chestnut |
| Allium cepa | Onion | |
| Aloeaceae | Aloe succotrina | Aloe |
| Arnica | Arnica montana | Leopard's bane |
| Arsenicum album | Arsenic trioxide | |
| Baptisia | Baptisia tinctoria | Wild indigo, horseflyweed |
| Belladonna | Atropa belladonna | Deadly nightshade |
| Bellis perennis | Bellis perennis | Common daisy |
| Calendula | Calendula officinalis | Scotch marigold |
| Colocynthis | Citrullus colocynthis | Bitter cucumber |
| Digitalis | Digitalis purpurea | Foxglove |
| Drosera | Drosera rotundifolia | Sundew |
| Dulcamara | Solanum dulcamara | Woody nightshade |
| Hamamelis | Hamamelis virginiana | Witch-hazel |
| Lachesis | Lachesis muta | Bushmaster snake |
| Ledum | Ledum palustre | Marsh tea |
| Lycopodium | Lycopodium clavatum | Wolf's foot, clubmoss |
| Thuja | Thuja occidentalis | |
| Urtica urens | Stinging nettle | |
| Mag phos | Magnesium Phosphoricum | Mag phos, Magnesium Hydrogen Phosphate Trihydrate, Phosphate of Magnesia |

== See also ==
- Bach flower remedies
