= International Journal of Neuroscience =

- Discipline: Neuroscience
- Language: English
- Edited by: Mohamad Bydon

Publication details
- History: 1978–present
- Publisher: Taylor & Francis (United States)
- Frequency: Monthly
- Impact factor: 2.107 (2019)

Standard abbreviations
- ISO 4: Int. J. Neurosci.

Indexing
- ISSN: 0020-7454 (print); 1563-5279 (web)

Links
- Journal homepage

The International Journal of Neuroscience is a peer-reviewed scientific journal that publishes original research articles, reviews, brief scientific notes, case studies, letters to the editor, and book reviews concerned with all aspects of neuroscience and neurology.

== Editors ==
The editor-in-chief of the International Journal of Neuroscience is Dr. Mohamad Bydon.
