= List of pseudoscientific water fuel inventions =

This article attempts to list pseudoscientific inventions wherein common water is used to either augment or generate a fuel to power an engine, boiler or other source of power. This is not to be confused with legitimate inventions (such as hydroelectricity) in which the kinetic energy of flowing water is used for power.

== Electrolysis ==
The electrolysis of water splits water into hydrogen and oxygen, producing a usable fuel, which, when burned, turns back into water. However, the energy required for electrolysis is greater than the energy released by burning this fuel, so this is not a viable way to manufacture energy. Nonetheless, several people have claimed to create devices that do exactly this.

- Stanley Meyer, who claimed to run a car on water in 1984.
- Charles Frazer, an inventor from Ohio who, in 1918 patented a hydrogen booster which claimed to use electrolysis to increase vehicle power and fuel efficiency while greatly reducing exhaust emissions.
- Daniel Dingel, a Filipino engineer who was involved in water fuel research since 1968. A video interview showed Dingel's Toyota Corolla with an on-board hydrogen water fuel generator. In 2008 he was given a 20-year sentence for fraud.

== Submerged gasification ==
Ruggero Maria Santilli's "Magnegas" recyclers, which use an underwater carbon arc to gasify bio-contaminated liquid into a clean-burning gas.

== Transformative claims ==
Water is claimed to be transformed into a fuel itself, by the addition of some ingredient. This may be either a highly concentrated addition, or a catalyst (i.e. not consumed in use).

- Hongcheng Magic Liquid
- Gasoline pill

== See also ==
- Free energy suppression conspiracy theory
- Hydrogen fuel enhancement
- Perpetual motion
- Water-fuelled car
- Water injection (engines)
