= Gasoline pill =

Several fictitious or fraudulent inventions that claim to turn water into gasoline

The gasoline pill or gasoline powder is claimed to turn water into gasoline, which can be used to run a combustion engine. The gasoline pill is one of several claims of suppressed inventions that circulate as urban legends. Usually these urban legends allege a conspiracy that the oil industry seeks to suppress the technology that turns water to gasoline. It is impossible to chemically convert water to gasoline using additives, since their chemical structures are completely different.

== Guido Franch ==
In the United States, the best known claim to have created a gasoline pill was the work of one Guido Franch, who was active from the 1950s through the 1970s. Franch called the resulting liquid Mota fuel.

Guido Franch was a blue collar worker who lived in Livingston, Illinois. His invention was a green powder that was added to water, which he claimed had actually been invented by a fictitious German scientist named Dr. Alexander Kraft. Franch took money from a number of small investors who read about his claims in the National Tattler or a similar tabloid publication. In what became a frequent motif, he claimed that the water-into-gasoline powder formula could not be disclosed for fear that the oil industry would have it suppressed. Franch, when pressed into providing samples of his transmutation powder, produced samples of green food coloring.

As a result of his activities, Franch was prosecuted several times for fraud. His first trial in 1954 resulted in his acquittal when a prosecution witness admitted that it might be possible that "mota fuel" worked. His second trial in 1979 resulted in his conviction.

== Other water-to-gasoline "inventors" ==
In 1916, Louis Enricht claimed to have a water-to-gasoline pill. Enricht was convicted of fraud in a related case, claiming to have a method for extracting gasoline from peat, and served time in Sing Sing prison. (The Fischer–Tropsch process, which can accomplish this, had not been invented yet.) In 1917, John Andrews pitched a water-to-gasoline powder to the United States Navy. Andrews disappeared after making his pitch, but it turned out that he had returned to Canada, where he was serving in the Royal Canadian Navy.

In 1996, Ramar Pillai from South India (Tamil Nadu) claimed to be able to transmute water to gasoline by a herbal formula that he claimed was the result of a miraculous bush Boswellia ovalifoliolata. Pillai obtained 20 acres (81,000 m^{2}) of land to cultivate his bush, but in fact it turned out that he was using sleight of hand to substitute kerosene for the liquid he claimed to have derived from the bush. In October 2016 Pillai and an associate were convicted of fraud and sentenced to 3 years of rigorous imprisonment.

In 1983, Wang Hongcheng announced his Hongcheng Magic Liquid, which purportedly turned regular water into fuel with just a few drops. His announcement was widely covered by Chinese media and he was even given public funding for a company that never released a product. Years later, in 1994, the Chinese government declared that superstition and pseudoscience was rising in China and that it would start efforts to stop it. One of those efforts was to publish an article critical of Hongcheng in Science and Technology Daily, thus turning the tide of public opinion against him. Hongcheng was investigated, put on trial, and imprisoned for fraud and deceit.

Between 1992 and 2007 a businessman called Tim Johnston managed to garner over $100 million from investors, principally in Australia and New Zealand, for the promotion of a "magic pill that cut emission and made fuel last longer". Registered in the Virgin Islands, his company Firepower International finally collapsed. No assets could be retrieved and no evidence could be found of the efficacy of the much-vaunted fuel tablet. Despite the illusory nature of the product, the company had attracted high-profile promoters and investors from the Australian government, armed forces, sport and show business.

== Gasoline pills in fiction ==
The storyline of the 1943 Laurel and Hardy film, Jitterbugs, revolves around a con man (Bob Bailey) selling gas pills during the fuel rationing days of WWII.

In the 1949 motion picture Free For All, Robert Cummings starred as a scientist who claimed to have invented a pill that turned water into gasoline.

The 1940s television/radio show People Are Funny performed a stunt in which an unsuspecting crowd at Hollywood and Vine were sold "Atom Pills" at a quarter apiece. A "scientist" claimed that one pill could do the work of a hundred gallons of gasoline. When the stunt was revealed, few of the dozens who had fought to buy the pills came up to get their money back.

In the television sitcom The Beverly Hillbillies, Jethro Bodine claimed to have devised a water to gasoline pill that ran the Clampetts' old truck on water.

In an episode of the 1960s American sitcom The Munsters, "The Sleeping Cutie", Grandpa invents a gasoline pill.

A season three episode of the 1950s American television show, Alcoa Presents: One Step Beyond, "Where Are They?", which originally aired 13 December 1960, presented a story about a man calling himself Charles Elton. Elton allegedly demonstrated to government representatives in 1917 a pill that costs 2 cents that can turn 10 gallons of water into a fuel that can power an auto engine. After his successful exhibition, Elton vanishes.

The 1977 Italian comedy movie Squadra Antitruffa (meaning "Anti-scam Squad") presents a story about a scammer repeatedly demonstrating "ionized hydrogen" pills, made in Japan, that are added to a car's fuel tank after filling it with water, which is then allegedly turned into fuel. The scammer then convinces the marks to buy a number of useless pills at 10000 lire each, until a rough-mannered cop exposes the scam and mocks the scammer saying "he fills his fuel tank with turds".

In E.L. Doctorow's historical novel Ragtime, Henry Ford must deal with a man claiming to have invented a water-to-gasoline pill; possibly a reference to Louis Enricht.

In episode 254 of The Simpsons, "The Computer Wore Menace Shoes," Homer is trapped on a mysterious island with, among others, a Number 27 who is trapped there because she knows how to turn water into gasoline.

== See also ==
- Firepower International, purveyor of a fraudulent gasoline additive pill
- Hongcheng Magic Liquid
- Oxyhydrogen
- Stanley Meyers' water fuel cell
- Water-fuelled car
- Water injection
