= Hongcheng Magic Liquid =

Chinese scientific fraud incident

The Hongcheng Magic Liquid incident was a scam in China where Wang Hongcheng (Chinese: 王洪成; pinyin: Wáng Hóngchéng; born 20 August 1954), a bus driver from Harbin with no scientific education, claimed in 1983 that he could turn water into a fuel as flammable as petrol by simply dissolving a few drops of his liquid in it. He founded the Hongcheng Magic Liquid company with funds from Chinese governmental agencies and other supporters, raising a total of 300 million yuan (US$37 million), but no product was ever released.

Around that time, in 1994, the Chinese Government, alarmed by an increase in pseudoscience and superstitions in the post-Mao era, made a declaration decrying the deterioration of science education in the country, taking several measures to improve science education and to improve the prevalence of science and technology in courts. One of these efforts was to require the scientific authoritative journal Science and Technology Daily to carry an article critical of Hongcheng's invention, which had been previously rejected at several major Chinese publications. This created a growing publicity and opposition of Hongcheng's invention, silencing his supporters.

In 1995, Hongcheng refused an invitation to carry out a scientific appraisal of his invention at Beijing, and the notable scientist and debunker He Zuoxiu and 40 other scientists made a statement calling for the Chinese Government to investigate his claims. Hongcheng was eventually arrested, put to trial, and in 1998, was found guilty of fraud and deceit and condemned to 10 years of prison.

== Invention and initial experiments ==
Wang Hongcheng was a bus driver from Harbin, a former soldier with ninth-grade education (Note: Meaning that he was schooled until the age of 14 or 15 years old. The magazine stating this is from the US, "ninth-grade" in the US corresponds to the first year of High school) and no scientific training. In 1983, he claimed that he invented a liquid that could transform a liter of regular water into a fuel by simply adding two or three drops of his liquid, and that this resulting fuel was as combustible as petrol. Hongcheng called it "the fifth greatest invention of China", in a reference to the four Great Inventions of China, and his invention became more popular, finally reaching on 28 January 1993 the front pages of a major national newspaper. In the winter of 1985, Wang showed this technique in Beijing, Hebei, Zhejiang and Shanghai.

== Hongcheng Magic Liquid company ==
The Chinese security and military departments started to look into his claims and funded his research. In 1992–1993, Hongcheng founded a company called Hongcheng Magic Liquid to manufacture his product and raised a total of 300 million yuan (US$37 million). (Note: Before the trial, Science had estimated the amount to be $50 million.) No product, working or otherwise, was ever commercially released.

== Chinese Government reaction and repercussions ==
In 1994, the Chinese government was alarmed by a recent rise in pseudoscience and a revival of old superstitions. It issued a declaration addressing the increase in superstition and ignorance, the decline of science education among the population, and the government's commitment to combat this situation. After this declaration, Song Jian, then chief director of the Chinese National Science Committee, held a conference on how to carry this work among the public. Song Jian was then told at the conference that an article debunking Hongcheng's invention had been refused publication in three major national newspapers and one scientific publication. Song Jian then required Science and Technology Daily, the most authoritative newspaper in China's science and technology, to publish it. This publication explained that when Hongcheng's invention hit newspaper front pages in 1993, different newspapers reported different proportions of oil and water in their announcements, and used this to make a critical analysis. It publicized the invention, started an opposition feeling, and silenced Hongcheng and their supporters.

== Fraud conviction ==
After the public backlash caused by He Zuoxiu's article, the Chinese people started to realize that Hongcheng's "technique" was a fraud. Hongcheng faced growing criticism from scientists and media. He Zuoxiu, a member of the Chinese Academy of Sciences as well a notable scientist and debunker, had been invited several times by Hongcheng's supporters to visit the northeast and watch his invention in action. In 1995, Zuoxiu asked them to Beijing to pass a scientific appraisal of his liquid, as the country capital would be a proper place for such a scientific and universal invention. Hongcheng refused, prompting Zuoxiu and a group of other 40 scientists to ask the top Chinese legislative body, the People's Political Consultative Conference, to investigate his claims. After this declaration, his invention collapsed by itself, and it was finally found that it was a fraud.

In 1998, he was found guilty of fraud and deceit and sent to prison for 10 years Hongcheng acquired the status of a legendary figure, because some people thought that it was a case of cover-up or of free energy suppression, where he would be imprisoned not because his formula would not really work, but because of refusing to release his secret formula to the government.

== Political and cultural context ==
The Chinese Government were alarmed by this and other similar cases of promotion of pseudoscience even before Hongcheng's refusal to carry a scientific appraisal at Beijing and the publicity it carried. The Chinese government decided to tighten the appraisal system for scientific claims and other measures like creating science and technology courts. After the death of Mao Zedong, several Western pseudoscience theories appeared in rural areas, together with the return to ancient China practices like ancestor worship, astrology and fortune telling. The government newspaper had lamented "the superstition of feudal ideology is raising again in the Chinese countryside". (Note: The effects of the recent Cultural Revolution had caused almost a generation to receive incomplete or no education, had reduced the literacy rates severely, and had killed or driven away many intellectuals.) Individual claiming to have "special powers" claimed that they project their Qi out of their body to cure people, and called "masters of Qi Gong", one of them being arrested after causing the death of several patients. The Asian Rhinoceros was being driven to extinction because pulverized Rhinoceros horn were said to prevent impotence, despite the fact that Rhinoceros horn is composed of keratin, the same substance that is present in human hair and fingernails.

To address all these issues, the government of China and the Chinese Communist Party made on 5 December 1994 a joint public declaration called "Some Suggestions on How to Reinforce the Popularization of Science". In it they lamented the recent withering of public education and the growth of pseudoscience and anti-science ideas, and then indicated that they would reinforce the public education about science.

Most officials support the effort to root out pseudoscience in China, although the government still sends occasionally mixed signals, like one incident when a high-ranking official ordered the Guangming Daily to pull a letter critical of Hongcheng at the last minute. He Zuoxiu explains that corruption will also have to be fought at the same time as pseudoscience, since some officials and journalists may "have a stake" in these inventions, and would be harmed by their exposure.

== See also ==
- List of water fuel inventions
- Water-fuelled car
- Gasoline pill
- List of topics characterized as pseudoscience
