= Stanley Meyer =

Stanley Meyer may refer to:

- Stanley Allen Meyer (1940–1998), fraudulently claimed that a car could use water as fuel instead of gasoline
- Stanley A. Meyer (born 1958), American scenic designer, production designer, and illustrator
