= He Zuoxiu =

Chinese physicist

He Zuoxiu (Chinese: 何祚庥; pinyin: Hé Zuòxiū; born 1927) is a Chinese nuclear physicist and member of Chinese Academy of Sciences. He is a member of the Chinese Communist Party (CCP) and a self-described "steadfast believer in Marxism". Along with Sima Nan, He is known as a "crusader" against supernatural and "unscientific thinking," and became famous in China for his criticism of the spiritual movement Falun Gong and support for its nationwide ban. He is also a critic of traditional Chinese medicine.

== Biography ==
He Zuoxiu was born in Shanghai in 1927. He was admitted to Shanghai Jiao Tong University in 1945, and transferred to Tsinghua University and graduated in 1951.

After graduation, he started working at CCP Propaganda Department. On May 21, 1952, He published an article titled "Soviet Scientists Criticize Idealism of Quantum Mechanics" on People's Daily, arguing that Mao's political criticism against Bourgeois idealism should be applied to the natural sciences as well. In 1955, he accused architect Liang Sicheng of committing the mistake of "Bourgeois idealism" and argued in favor of destroying the Beijing city wall. In 1956, He started working at the atomic energy division of the Science Institute of China, and in 1958, he went to the Joint Institute for Nuclear Research in the USSR. In 1960, he returned to China to join the development of China's hydrogen bomb.

He was elected a member of Chinese Academy of Sciences in 1980. In 1987, He published an article claiming Marxist philosophy should guide the research and development of natural sciences.

In 2001 He published a paper claiming "the development of quantum mechanics proves that CCP general secretary Jiang Zemin. Jiang's theory on 'Three Represents' is the fundamental criterion of evaluating scientific and technological innovation".

== Criticism of pseudoscience ==
In 1994, He led a group of scientists to speak out against the Hongcheng Magic Liquid, a solution that purportedly turned water into fuel. He criticized officials who were taking kick-backs for advancing pseudoscience. He's criticism sparked an investigation and brought media attention to the claims, eventually exposing the Liquid as fraudulent.

In the 1990s, He Zuoxiu was particularly active in his criticism of "extraordinary powers." He zoomed in especially on Qigong and related phenomena, due to the fantastic claims made by so-called masters of the practice. He publicly spoke out against renowned scientists Qian Xuesen, condemning the latter's support for Qigong-related research. He advocated for a stronger role for state control in science. His crusade against pseudoscience was endorsed by four overseas Chinese Nobel Prize winners. He conceded that he was not opposed to the practice of Qigong per se as a breathing and meditation exercise, but rather the 'scientific' claims behind Qigong's effect. He believed that Qigong claims which could not be backed up by modern scientific concepts was all pseudoscience and superstition, and therefore needed to be eliminated.

In November 2006, He Zuoxiu gave an interview entitled "Life and Death: Traditional Chinese Medicine" in the publication Huanqiu Renwu (lit. "Global People"). In the interview He stated that the progression of history, more 'advanced' forms of thinking will always replace 'backward' forms, and asserted that TCM is 'backward'. He called the fundamental system of TCM, i.e., the belief in yin-yang and Wu Xing (Five phases), totally "unscientific." He said that the increased adoption of modern medicine vis-a-vis TCM is evidence that the latter is going to be eventually 'eliminated' from practice. While he concedes the TCM has some "advanced treatment methods," he says that "on the whole it falls short of [modern] Western medicine." In May 2007, He Zuoxiu continued his criticism of TCM, asserting that actress Chen Xiaoxu died from failing to see a doctor and instead relying purely on traditional herbal medicine. His sentiments were echoed by other Chinese scientists, including Zhang Gongyao and Fang Zhouzi. The group is now campaigning for the abolition of TCM practice.

He Zuoxiu is friends with Sima Nan and Fang Zhouzi. In 2006, He, Sima Nan, Yuan Zhong and Guo Zhengyi established "Anti-Fraud Trust", soliciting donations from the public. The express purpose of the trust was to fund Fang Zhouzi's activities.

== See also ==
- Scientific publishing in China
