= Fuel cell (disambiguation) =

Fuel cell may refer to:

- Fuel cell, an electrochemical device
- Racing fuel cell, a gasoline tank with baffles that prevent sloshing typically found in a race vehicle, but also on some street vehicles.
- Stanley Meyer's water fuel cell, a fraudulent device for allegedly powering a car from water
- An aircraft fuel tank (see Fuel tank#Aircraft)
