= Water-fuelled car =

Hypothetical vehicle deriving energy from water

A water-fuelled car is an automobile that hypothetically derives its energy directly from water. Water-fuelled cars have been the subject of numerous international patents, newspaper and popular science magazine articles, local television news coverage, and websites. The claims for these devices have been found to be pseudoscience and some were found to be tied to investment frauds. These vehicles may be claimed to produce fuel from water on board with no other energy input, or may be a hybrid claiming to derive some of its energy from water in addition to a conventional source (such as gasoline). There is no way to extract chemical energy from water alone which is consistent with the laws of physics.

== What water-fuelled cars are not ==
A water-fuelled car is not any of the following:

- Water injection, which is a method for cooling the combustion chambers of engines by adding water to the incoming fuel-air mixture, allowing for greater compression ratios and reduced engine knocking (detonation).
- The hydrogen car, although it often incorporates some of the same elements. To fuel a hydrogen car from water, electricity is used to generate hydrogen by electrolysis. The resulting hydrogen is an energy carrier that can power a car by reacting with oxygen from the air to create water, either through burning in a combustion engine or catalyzed to produce electricity in a fuel cell.
- Hydrogen fuel enhancement, where a mixture of hydrogen and conventional hydrocarbon fuel is burned in an internal combustion engine, usually in an attempt to improve fuel economy or reduce emissions.
- The steam car, which uses water (in both liquid and gaseous forms) as a working fluid, not as a fuel.
- An electric car charged with or directly powered by hydroelectricity.

== Extracting energy from water ==
According to the laws of physics, there is no way to extract chemical energy from water alone. Water itself is highly stable—it was one of the classical elements and contains very strong chemical bonds. Its enthalpy of formation is negative (−68.3 kcal/mol or −285.8 kJ/mol), meaning that energy is required to break those stable bonds, to separate water into its elements, and there are no other compounds of hydrogen and oxygen with more negative enthalpies of formation, meaning that no energy can be released in this manner either.

Most proposed water-fuelled cars rely on some form of electrolysis to separate water into hydrogen and oxygen and then recombine them to release energy. However, the first law of thermodynamics guarantees that the energy required to separate the elements will always be equal to the amount of energy released (assuming no losses), so this cannot be used to produce net energy. The second law of thermodynamics further states that the amount of useful energy released this way is necessarily less than the amount of energy input.

== Claims of functioning water-fuelled cars ==
=== Garrett electrolytic carburetor ===
Charles H. Garrett allegedly demonstrated a water-fuelled car "for several minutes", which was reported on September 8, 1935, in The Dallas Morning News. The car generated hydrogen by electrolysis as can be seen by examining Garrett's patent, issued that same year. This patent includes drawings which show a carburetor similar to an ordinary float-type carburetor but with electrolysis plates in the lower portion, and where the float is used to maintain the level of the water. Garrett's patent fails to identify a new source of energy.

=== Malcolm Vincent's water powered car ===
In 1973, Malcolm Vincent, of Nelson, New Zealand, was the star of a four-minute newsreel about his claim to have invented an engine powered by water. He had fitted a prototype to a car and said he's driven hundreds of miles at speeds up to 60 miles an hour. Vincent told the reporter that the engine works on a hydraulic principle, using an ordinary electric starter to give it an initial thrust.

=== Stanley Meyer's water fuel cell ===
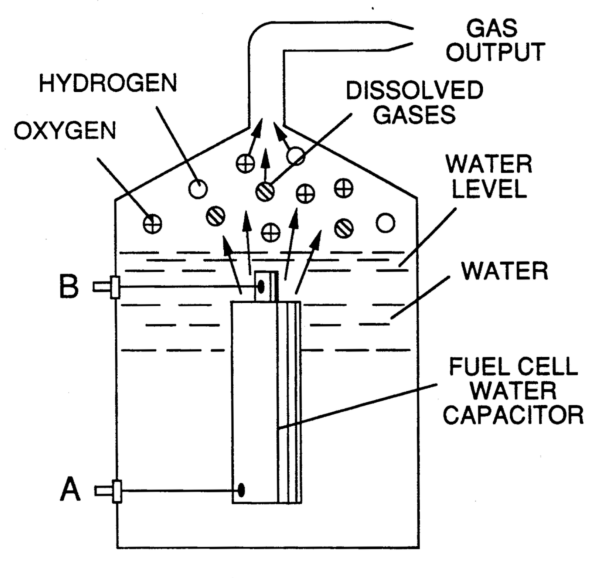
Stanley Meyer's water fuel cell

At least as far back as 1980, Stanley Meyer claimed that he had built a dune buggy that ran on water, although he gave inconsistent explanations as to its mode of operation. In some cases, he claimed that he had replaced the spark plugs with a "water splitter", while in other cases it was claimed to rely on a "fuel cell" that split the water into hydrogen and oxygen. The "fuel cell", which he claimed was subjected to an electrical resonance, would split the water mist into hydrogen and oxygen gas, which would then be combusted back into water vapour in a conventional internal combustion engine to produce net energy. Meyer's claims were never independently verified, and in an Ohio court in 1996 he was found guilty of "gross and egregious fraud". He died of an aneurysm in 1998, although conspiracy theories claim that he was poisoned.

=== Dennis Klein ===
In 2002, the firm Hydrogen Technology Applications patented an electrolyser design and trademarked the term "Aquygen" to refer to the hydrogen oxygen gas mixture produced by the device. Originally developed as an alternative to oxyacetylene welding, the company claimed to be able to run a vehicle exclusively on water, via the production of "Aquygen", and invoked an unproven state of matter called "magnegases" and a discredited theory about magnecules to explain their results. Company founder Dennis Klein claimed to be in negotiations with a major US auto manufacturer and that the US government wanted to produce Hummers that used his technology.

At present, the company no longer claims it can run a car exclusively on water, and is instead marketing "Aquygen" production as a technique to increase fuel efficiency, thus making it hydrogen fuel enhancement rather than a water-fuelled car.

=== Genesis World Energy (GWE) ===
Also in 2002, Genesis World Energy announced a market ready device which would extract energy from water by separating the hydrogen and oxygen and then recombining them. In 2003, the company announced that this technology had been adapted to power automobiles. The company collected over $2.5 million from investors, but none of their devices were ever brought to market. In 2006, Patrick Kelly, the owner of Genesis World Energy was sentenced in New Jersey to five years in prison for theft and ordered to pay $400,000 in restitution.

=== Genepax Water Energy System ===
In June 2008, Japanese company Genepax unveiled a car it claimed ran on only water and air, and many news outlets dubbed the vehicle a "water-fuel car". The company said it "cannot [reveal] the core part of this invention" yet, but it disclosed that the system used an onboard energy generator, which it called a "membrane electrode assembly", to extract the hydrogen using a "mechanism which is similar to the method in which hydrogen is produced by a reaction of metal hydride and water". The hydrogen was then used to generate energy to run the car. This led to speculation that the metal hydride is consumed in the process and is the ultimate source of the car's energy, making it a hydride-fuelled "hydrogen on demand" vehicle rather than water-fuelled as claimed. On the company's website the energy source is explained only with the words "Chemical reaction". The science and technology magazine Popular Mechanics described Genepax's claims as "rubbish". The vehicle Genepax demonstrated to the press in 2008 was a REVAi electric car, which was manufactured in India and sold in the UK as the G-Wiz.

In early 2009, Genepax announced they were closing their website, citing large development costs.

=== Thushara Priyamal Edirisinghe ===
Also in 2008, Sri Lankan news sources reported that Thushara Priyamal Edirisinghe claimed to drive a water-fuelled car about 300 km (190 miles). on 3 litres (5.3 imperial pints) of water. Like other alleged water-fuelled cars described above, energy for the car was supposedly produced by splitting water into hydrogen and oxygen using electrolysis, and then burning the gases in the engine. Thushara showed the technology to Prime Minister Ratnasiri Wickramanayaka, who "extended the Government’s full support to his efforts to introduce the water-powered car to the Sri Lankan market". Thushara was arrested a few months later on suspicion of investment fraud.

=== Daniel Dingel ===
Daniel Dingel, a Filipino inventor, has been claiming since 1969 to have developed technology allowing water to be used as fuel. In 2000, Dingel entered into a business partnership with Formosa Plastics Group to further develop the technology. In 2008, Formosa Plastics successfully sued Dingel for fraud and Dingel, who was 82, was sentenced to 20 years' imprisonment.

=== Ghulam Sarwar ===
In December 2011, Ghulam Sarwar claimed he had invented a car that ran only on water. At the time the invented car was claimed to use 60% water and 40% Diesel or fuel, but that the inventor was working to make it run on only water, probably by end of June 2012. It was further claimed the car "emits only oxygen rather than the usual carbon".

=== Agha Waqar Ahmad ===
Pakistani man Agha Waqar Ahmad claimed in July 2012 to have invented a water-fuelled car by installing a "water kit" for all kind of automobiles, which consists of a cylindrical jar that holds the water, a bubbler, and a pipe leading to the engine. He claimed the kit used electrolysis to convert water into "HHO", which is then used as fuel. The kit required use of distilled water to work. Ahmed claimed he has been able to generate more oxyhydrogen than any other inventor because of "undisclosed calculations". He applied for a patent in Pakistan. Some Pakistani scientists said Agha's invention was a fraud that violates the laws of thermodynamics.

=== Aryanto Misel ===
Indonesian inventor Aryanto Misel claimed in May 2022 that his invention, called Nikuba, can convert water into hydrogen that can be used as fuel for motorcycles. Aryanto claimed that he only required 1 liter of water for the distance of 500 kilometers.

In July 2023, Aryanto claimed that Italian-based automobile manufacturers Lamborghini, Ducati, and Ferrari are interested in Nikuba. He also claimed that he is willing to sell the device to foreign companies for 15 billion rupiahs, while also claiming that he didn't need the Indonesian government and National Research and Innovation Agency as they have "destroyed" him. Indonesian scientists from National Research and Innovation Agency stated that the device is theoretically impossible. They also stated that there is no interest from Italian automobile manufacturers in Nikuba, and Aryanto was invited by their partners instead of the automobile manufacturers.

== Hydrogen as a supplement ==
In addition to claims of cars that run exclusively on water, there have also been claims that burning hydrogen or oxyhydrogen together with petrol or diesel increases mileage and efficiency; these claims are debated. A number of websites promote the use of oxyhydrogen, also called "HHO", selling plans for do-it-yourself electrolysers or kits with the promise of large improvements in fuel efficiency. According to a spokesman for the American Automobile Association, "All of these devices look like they could probably work for you, but let me tell you they don't".

== Gasoline pill and related additives ==
Related to the water-fuelled car hoax are claims that additives, often a pill, can convert the water into usable fuel, similar to a carbide lamp, in which a high-energy additive produces the combustible fuel. These claims are all false, and often with fraudulent intent, as water itself cannot contribute any energy to the process.

== Hydrogen on demand technologies ==
A hydrogen on demand vehicle uses a chemical reaction to produce hydrogen from water. The hydrogen is then burned in an internal combustion engine or used in a fuel cell to generate electricity which powers the vehicle. These designs take energy from the chemical that reacts with water; vehicles of this type are not precluded by the laws of nature. Aluminium, magnesium, and sodium borohydride react with water to generate hydrogen and have been used in hydrogen on demand prototypes. Eventually, the chemical runs out and has to be replenished. The energy required to produce such compounds exceeds the energy obtained from their reaction with water.

One example of a hydrogen on demand device, created by scientists from the University of Minnesota and the Weizmann Institute of Science, uses boron to generate hydrogen from water. An article in New Scientist in July 2006 described the power source under the headline "A fuel tank full of water," and they quote Abu-Hamed as saying:

The aim is to produce the hydrogen on-board at a rate matching the demand of the car engine. We want to use the boron to save transporting and storing the hydrogen.

A vehicle powered by the device would take on water and boron instead of petrol, and generate boron trioxide. Elemental boron is difficult to prepare and does not occur naturally. Boron trioxide is an example of a borate, which is the predominant form of boron on earth. Thus, a boron-powered vehicle would require an economical method of preparing elemental boron. The chemical reactions describing the oxidation of boron are:

$\ce{4B + 6H2O -> 2B2O3 + 6H2}$ [Hydrogen generation step]
$\ce{6H2 + 3O2 -> 6H2O}$ [Combustion step]

The balanced chemical equation representing the overall process (hydrogen generation and combustion) is:

$$\ce{4B + 3O2 -> 2B2O3}$$

As shown above, boron trioxide is the only net byproduct, and it could be removed from the car and turned back into boron and reused. Electricity input is required to complete this process, which Al-Hamed suggests could come from solar panels. Although it is possible to obtain elemental boron by electrolysis, a substantial expenditure of energy is required. The process of converting borates to elemental boron and back might be compared with the analogous process involving carbon: carbon dioxide could be converted to charcoal (elemental carbon), then burnt to produce carbon dioxide.

== In popular culture ==
It is referred to in the pilot episode for the That '70s Show sitcom, as well as in the twenty-first episode of the fifth season and the series finale.

"Gashole" (2010), a documentary film about the history of oil prices and the future of alternative mentions multiple stories regarding engines that use water to increase mileage efficiency.

"Like Water for Octane," an episode of The Lone Gunmen, is based on a "water-powered" car that character Melvin Frohike saw with his own eyes back in 1962.

The Water Engine, a David Mamet play made into a television film in 1994, tells the story of Charles Lang inventing an engine that runs using water for fuel. The plot centers on the many obstacles the inventor must overcome to patent his device.

The plot of the 1996 action film Chain Reaction revolves around a technology to turn water (via a type of self-sustaining bubble fusion & electrolysis) into fuel and official suppression of it.

A water-powered car was depicted in a 1997 episode of Team Knight Rider (a spinoff of the original Knight Rider TV series) entitled "Oil and Water". In the episode, the vehicle explodes after a character sabotages it by putting seltzer tablets in the fuel tank. The car shown was actually a Bricklin SV-1.

== See also ==
- List of topics characterized as pseudoscience
- List of water fuel inventions
- Perpetual motion
- Water power engine
