= Unlimited energy =

Unlimited energy may refer to:

- Perpetual motion, a device or system that delivers more energy than was put into it
- Sustainable energy, the provision of energy such that it meets the needs of the present without compromising the ability of future generations to meet their needs
  - Renewable energy, energy that uses natural resources that may be naturally replenished

== See also ==
- Free energy suppression, a conspiracy theory that says that technology that could produce unlimited energy is being suppressed by special interest groups
