= Hydroxy =

Hydroxy can refer to:

- In chemical nomenclature, the prefix "hydroxy-" shows the presence of a hydroxyl functional group (−OH).
- An abbreviation for the medication hydroxyzine, which is commonly sold under the brand names Atarax, Ucerax, Serecid, and Vistaril.
- Hydroxy gas, a nickname for oxyhydrogen, a combination of hydrogen and oxygen gas produced from the electrolysis of water.
