= China Science Daily =

Chinese newspaper

中国科学报 China Science Daily
- Type: Daily newspaper
- Founded: January 1, 1959; 67 years ago
- Language: Simplified Chinese
- Headquarters: No. 3B, South First Street, Zhongguancun, Haidian District, Beijing, China
- Website: https://english.sciencenet.cn

The China Science Daily (simplified Chinese: 中国科学报; traditional Chinese: 中國科學報) is the earliest science and technology newspaper established in the People's Republic of China. It is managed by the Chinese Academy of Sciences, and jointly sponsored by the Chinese Academy of Sciences, the Chinese Academy of Engineering, the National Natural Science Foundation of China and the China Association for Science and Technology, and is published by the China Science Daily Press.

== History ==
On January 1, 1959, the newspaper Science News (科學報) was founded in Beijing, as the earliest science and technology newspaper in China. It was originally the official news bulletin of the Chinese Academy of Sciences.

During the Cultural Revolution (1966 ~ 1976), the newspaper was suspended.

On November 2, 1979, the newspaper resumed publication.

In 1985, the newspaper began to be publicly distributed in China. The number of subscriptions that year reached nearly 50,000.

On January 1, 1989, the newspaper was renamed "China Science Daily".

On July 1, 1993, the Overseas Edition of the newspaper was officially launched.

On January 1, 1999, China Science Daily was renamed "Science Times" (科學時報). By that time, the newspaper had evolved into a broadsheet daily covering wide issues of science, health, medicine and environment..

On January 18, 2007, ScienceNet was officially launched and quickly became one of the top science and technology websites in China.

In August 2011, with the approval of the State Press and Publication Administration, the newspaper resumed to the name of "China Science Daily".

In December 2017, China Science Daily was recommended by the State Administration of Press, Publication, Radio, Film and Television as one of the top 100 newspapers and periodicals in China.

In April 2021, the newspaper was awarded the title of "National Scientific Research and Popular Science Base" by the Chinese Academy of Sciences and the Ministry of Science and Technology.

In 2024, the newspaper was selected as one of the "Chinese Newspapers with High Academic Influence".

In May 2025, the newspaper's "Xiao Ke" robot editor was integrated with the large language model of DeepSeek.

== Current status ==
China Science Daily is managed by the Chinese Academy of Sciences, and jointly sponsored by the Chinese Academy of Sciences, the Chinese Academy of Engineering, the National Natural Science Foundation of China, and the China Association for Science and Technology.

The newspaper is published five days a week, by the China Science Daily Press, and distributed nationwide. It has a large readership of science and technology workers, including all academicians of the Chinese Academy of Sciences and the Chinese Academy of Engineering.

Nowaday, the original newspaper China Science Daily has developed into the China Science Daily Press (group), supervising two newspapers (China Science Daily and Medical Science Daily), one website (ScienceNet, the online newspaper), two magazines (Science News and Science New Life), and a matrix of mobile new media platforms. Among them, ScienceNet (www.sciencenet.cn) has an average annual page view count of over 300 million, ranking first among the Chinese-language science and technology websites.

The China Science Daily covers the following sections: International, General, Fields, People, Higher Education Focus, Technology Transfer, Scientific and Technological Innovation, Special Reports, Two Sessions, Book Review, National Natural Science Foundation of China, Culture, University Observation, Exemplary Figures, Sustainable Development and Open Cooperation.

Contact address: No. 3B, South First Street, Zhongguancun, Haidian District, Beijing, China.

== See also ==
- Chinese Academy of Sciences
- Science and Technology Daily
