= Firepower International =

Fraudulent Australian company (2004–07)

Firepower Operations Pty Ltd
- Type: Private
- Founded: 2004; 22 years ago in Perth, Western Australia
- Founder: Timothy Francis (Tim) Johnston
- Defunct: 2007
- Fate: Shut down by Australian Securities and Investments Commission
- Headquarters: Perth, Australia
- Products: Firepower Pill

Firepower International was a fraudulent company that advertised as a Hong Kong-based company owned and operated by Global Fuel Technologies Ltd, specializing in technology purporting to reduce the fuel consumption and environmental impact of petrol-operated vehicles. There were other offices in Sydney, China, Rhodes, Athens and Papua New Guinea, according to the now-defunct official company website. However, "in reality it was a handful of people in an industrial estate in Perth", who were conducting a complex of fraudulent operations. The original entity—Firepower Operations Pty Ltd—was a A$1 company, first registered in December 2004, owned by Firepower Holdings Group Ltd, a company with an address in the British Virgin Islands.

Through connections created with Australian federal ministers, trade officials and their networks, the governments of Britain, Russia, Romania and many others were persuaded to believe Firepower offered important solutions to global warming and the peak oil energy crisis. However, after questions were raised about the efficacy of the "Firepower Pill" and related products in reducing engine fuel consumption, the Firepower organisation's principal, Tim Johnston, was claimed by media critics to have perpetrated a large-scale confidence trick or scam and became the subject of investigation by the Australian Securities and Investments Commission (ASIC). In July 2011, ASIC banned Johnston from managing any company for twenty years.

== Firepower Pill ==
Firepower International's main product was the Firepower Pill, advertised as being able to "lower fuel consumption, reduce emissions, [and] clean and maintain your engine". The product was claimed to work by "burning more of the heavier elements of your fuel, increasing power and fuel economy" and because more of the fuel is consumed in the combustion process, hydrocarbon and carbon-dioxide emissions are lowered. Inserted into a vehicle's fuel tank, a single Firepower Pill was advertised as being able to treat up to 60 litres of petrol. Elsewhere, a larger pill was advertised, claimed to be able to treat 200 litres of petrol or diesel.

== Government involvement ==
The Australian government became involved in the scam in a number of ways—through defence-force agencies and personnel, through the export agency Austrade and directly through successful lobbying of federal minister for science Julie Bishop and Prime Minister John Howard. Johnston reportedly promised significant donations to the Liberal Party and an attempt was made to secure a funding grant from the government's A$500-million Low Emission Technology Demonstration Fund. A related Firepower entity, TPS Firepower, received almost A$400,000 in export grants from the government.

The fraud could not have continued for so long, or become so large, had it not been for the crucial intervention of Austrade. Somebody at the trade commission, probably someone junior, failed to make a rudimentary verification of any of the grandiose claims Johnston was making. Austrade took on Firepower as a client and opened doors to contacts around the world through Australian embassies. Over time, Firepower received $394,000 in grants under the Export Market Development Grants scheme. A senior Austrade manager, John Finnin, was recruited by Johnston as his chief executive. The senior trade commissioner at the Australian Embassy in Moscow, Gregory Klumov, was recruited to run Firepower's Russian operation. For years, Johnston was able to wrap himself in the credibility of government patronage.

== Sporting sponsorship ==
At its height, Firepower was one of Australia's biggest sporting sponsors. Under the company's mounting debts, commitments were reneged upon, leaving sporting teams struggling with financial pressures.

The Sydney Kings, an Australian basketball franchise part-owned by Tim Johnston, were forced to cease operations because of the collapse of Firepower. Kings players were owed large sums in unpaid wages and superannuation—a figure quoted at A$265,073.

The Perth-based rugby union team Western Force was promised millions of dollars in funding which failed to materialise, causing loss of contracted players, notably Matt Giteau.

In 2006, the rugby league team South Sydney Rabbitohs was bought by business partners Russell Crowe and Peter Holmes à Court. On 5 November that year, Russell Crowe appeared on The Tonight Show with Jay Leno and announced that Firepower was sponsoring South Sydney Rabbitohs for A$3 million over three years. Crowe showed viewers a Rabbitohs jersey with Firepower's name on it. In a press release, Peter Holmes à Court announced

Russell and I have been particularly keen to take the club forward in a socially responsible fashion and Firepower certainly fulfils that criteria. Firepower is an Australian success story—operating in over 50 countries globally and currently expanding rapidly into new markets. Firepower is an emerging brand that is already a global leader in its category.

== Controversy and demise ==
After an abortive plan (aided by the Australian government in October 2006) to establish headquarters in Switzerland, the group's founder and chief executive, Tim Johnston, moved to the United Kingdom where his whereabouts were concealed for almost two years until he was located in London by The Australian newspaper.

=== Corporate charges ===
In 2007, Firepower came under investigation by The Australian Securities and Investments Commission over raising "$60 million without adequate financial disclosures to investors". ASIC sought court orders to have Johnston, who left New Zealand in controversial circumstances in the mid-1990s, banned from operating companies in Australia. On 21 July 2008, ASIC also filed an action in the Federal Court of Australia against companies associated with Gordon Hill, Warren Anderson, Leslie Stein (Sattvic Pty Ltd) and financial adviser Quentin Ward, who is believed to have sold more than A$40 million of the shares in Perth. Ward was subsequently banned from managing a company for six years. Anderson's company Owston Nominees was alleged to have been issued 40 million one-cent shares in Firepower's Virgin Islands-based parent company Firepower BVI in June 2005, which were onsold for up to 50c a share. In March 2010, it was reported that former Western Australia state Labor government minister Gordon Hill, facing a A$5 million lawsuit, had declared bankruptcy.

=== Product doubts ===
There were also questions over whether the Firepower Pill worked as advertised. Commentators pointed to the refusal of Firepower to give detailed information about how the pill functioned and similarities between the Firepower Pill and the FE-3 pill, which had been independently proven not to increase vehicle performance.

The Firepower Pill was tested for effectiveness by the former Western Australian Department of Consumer and Employment Protection. The investigation "raised some real concerns about the validity of claims ... that Firepower made [on the packaging] in support of the fuel saving and emission reducing properties of the Firepower Pill". In light of this, the department ordered that the Firepower Pill be withdrawn from sale in Western Australia, together with other purported fuel-saving devices whose advertised claims were not substantiated.

In response, Firepower claimed many notable organizations used its product - including the Australian and New Zealand military forces and a V8 supercars team, despite the fact that no fuel additives are allowed by V8 Supercar regulations. The claims were denied by those named. Firepower also claimed to its shareholders that it was taking part in joint ventures with Shell and General Motors—claims that both companies refuted.

=== Damning documents found on computer ===
On 28 February 2009, The West Australian newspaper announced that "Thousands of internal Firepower documents have been discovered in a computer abandoned by the disgraced fuel technology firm before its multi-million-dollar collapse in 2007". The computer, believed to have been the internet server for all the computers in Firepower's Perth office, had no hard drive but contained 3 SCSI interface storage devices which had captured "thousands of emails and other documents including being sent to and from Tim Johnston, his executives and office staff". It was one of five hardware items purchased at auction for A$40 by local Internet café owner Mr Henk Beugelaar.

The documents included:

- company cheque butts, including one recording a A$10,000 "gift" to the President of Pakistan, General Pervez Musharraf
- evidence that the Howard government was complicit in official high-level backing of Firepower products through Austrade offices
- evidence of the company's constant quest for connections with high-ranking government and military officials to get deals done and acknowledgement that such consultants needed to be "looked after"

=== Federal Court action ===
Firepower's Australian operations were put into liquidation in early July 2008 in the Federal Court of Australia, followed by the British Virgin Islands arm in late September. The action was commenced by the company's own lawyers over a debt of A$70,000 and joined by mining magnate Ross Graham, who had lent Johnston A$25 million. The liquidator, Bryan Hughes reportedly believes the company traded while insolvent from 22 July 2007 and that "Johnson had stashed up to A$38 million in overseas bank accounts and was planning to use the money to build a replica company called Green Power Corporation". Firepower Operations estimated that, in July 2008, it owed more than A$16 million to various creditors, investors and groups it had sponsorship deals with.

==== Australian Securities and Investments Commission ====
Warren Anderson's company Owston Nominees No 2 was the subject of a court action launched by ASIC, which claims it sold Firepower shares to small investors without giving them a prospectus, making a A$20-million windfall. Anderson publicly urged Johnston to face his accusers. On 8 February 2011, ASIC's proceedings against Owston and other respondents were successful, the Federal Court finding that declarations and publicity orders were an appropriate form of relief for the contraventions of s727(1) of the [Corporations] Act. On 18 August 2011, ASIC succeeded in obtaining a similar determination and Federal Court orders against Sattvic Pty Ltd, the company operated by Leslie Stein.

In September 2014, ASIC announced that it had finalised its investigation.

Following ASIC’s inquiries, a brief of evidence was forwarded to the CDPP for consideration. Having regard to the evidence obtained by ASIC, the CDPP has recently informed ASIC that it is not satisfied there are reasonable prospects of a conviction, as is required under the Prosecution Policy of the Commonwealth to enable a prosecution to be commenced.

==== Return of Johnston to Australia ====
Because Johnston was never charged with fraud, ASIC lacked the necessary criminal-law basis for pursuit of his extradition to face charges in Australia. He simply had to stay out of the country to avoid facing shareholders. However, on 2 November 2009, Johnston openly returned to Australia, reportedly to see family members. On 5 November, he was ordered by the Federal Court not to leave the country, to surrender passports and to appear in a Perth court on 26 November. The injunction was served on Johnston at his Gold Coast mansion. Johnston surrendered two passports but failed to make the court appearance, citing a heart condition and fears for his personal safety. The hearing was adjourned and arrangements made for him to appear by video link from Queensland.

It has also been alleged that Johnston sought to rehabilitate his reputation while in England and facilitate continuing fraudulent actions, by use of a purported letter from ASIC which declared: "Our findings based on credible and confidential information obtained by this office, Indicates (sic) that you have acted appropriately and in accordance with the Corporate Guideline Act and therefore this office no longer finds you a person of interest in this matter." However, an ASIC spokeswoman disclaimed the existence of a "Corporate Guideline Act".

On 8 December 2009 Johnston faced the Federal Court in Perth and was examined by the liquidator, Bryan Hughes. On his way into the court room he was served with legal documents and a summons before proceedings even started. He was examined in detail over various financial transactions, including family travel payments and transactions surrounding the purchase of his Mosman Park mansion and claimed that he was forced to buy the property by his close friend and occasional antagonist Warren Anderson. In earlier evidence he claimed that Anderson forced him to pay A$4 million into Anderson's family company, Owston Nominees, then received a loan from Owston Nominees the following day to the value of A$5.8 million to allow the purchase of the property.

Johnston was accompanied later in the day by his wife Sandra and two daughters. Sandra Johnston had fled to Bali after the seizure of Johnston's passports, concerned at her own potential liability due to her position as a company director between 2005 and 2008. She stayed in the Nusa Dua Asmara cliffside villa built by Gordon Hill when he was a director of Firepower and purchased with Firepower funds. While at the villa she was allegedly intimidated by tattooed men and mystery packages. Johnston told the court that he was personally threatened by Anderson, who had used "particular people" to intimidate him.

=== Other court proceedings ===
==== Ross Graham ====
In 2008, mining entrepreneur Ross Graham, obtained a Western Australian Supreme Court order for immediate payment of over A$12 m in respect of a personally guaranteed loan. Graham proposed to commence bankruptcy proceedings if the amount was not paid, but acknowledged that he is unlikely to recover any of the money.

==== IMF (Australia) ====
It has been estimated that Australian "mum-and-dad" investors were shorn of A$100 million by a small number of entrepreneurial investors and professional advisors with inside contacts who purchased Firepower shares at a very low price for on-selling to others at much higher prices. On 3 June 2009, The West Australian newspaper announced that "Former WA police minister Gordon Hill has become the first target of investors trying to recover their money from the wreckage of failed fuel technology company Firepower after he was hit with a $5 million lawsuit yesterday". The Supreme Court writ was filed on behalf of 79 investors by lawyers for litigation funder IMF (Australia). Investors paid for shares in Firepower Holdings Limited (registered in the Cayman Islands) but were given shares in Firepower Holdings Group Limited (registered in the British Virgin Islands).

The report added that other dealers were expected to be targeted, including the private companies of property tycoon Warren Anderson and Sydney lawyer Les Stein, both of whom were heavily involved in Firepower. IMF managing director Hugh McLernon said "We will probably look at recovering about $40 million but I would be thinking that we would be battling to do much more than that."

On 17 September 2010, IMF lodged a second WA Supreme Court writ on behalf of 242 Firepower investors seeking more than A$5 million from Les and Miriam Stein and their family company Sattvic; up to A$26 million from Fremantle lawyers Matthew Morgan and Stefan Alteruthemeyer and their company Maclma; and about A$8 million from the National Australia Bank. A press report cited IMF's investment manager Paul Rainford as planning a third action against a Singapore company with the goal of recovering a total of A$60 million through the three lawsuits. IMF had decided not to pursue either Johnston or Anderson because of their likely financial incapacity.

Johnston declared bankruptcy in 2011. On 19 May 2012 liquidator Pitcher Partners said they would no longer pursue Johnston, with managing director Bryan Hughes claiming he was still owed over $100,000 for the investigation. Mr Hughes said forensic accountants Worrells Solvency & Forensic Accountants had approached all creditors including himself seeking further funds.

== See also ==
- Gasoline pill
