= Sima Nan =

Chinese journalist (born 1956)

- 司马南
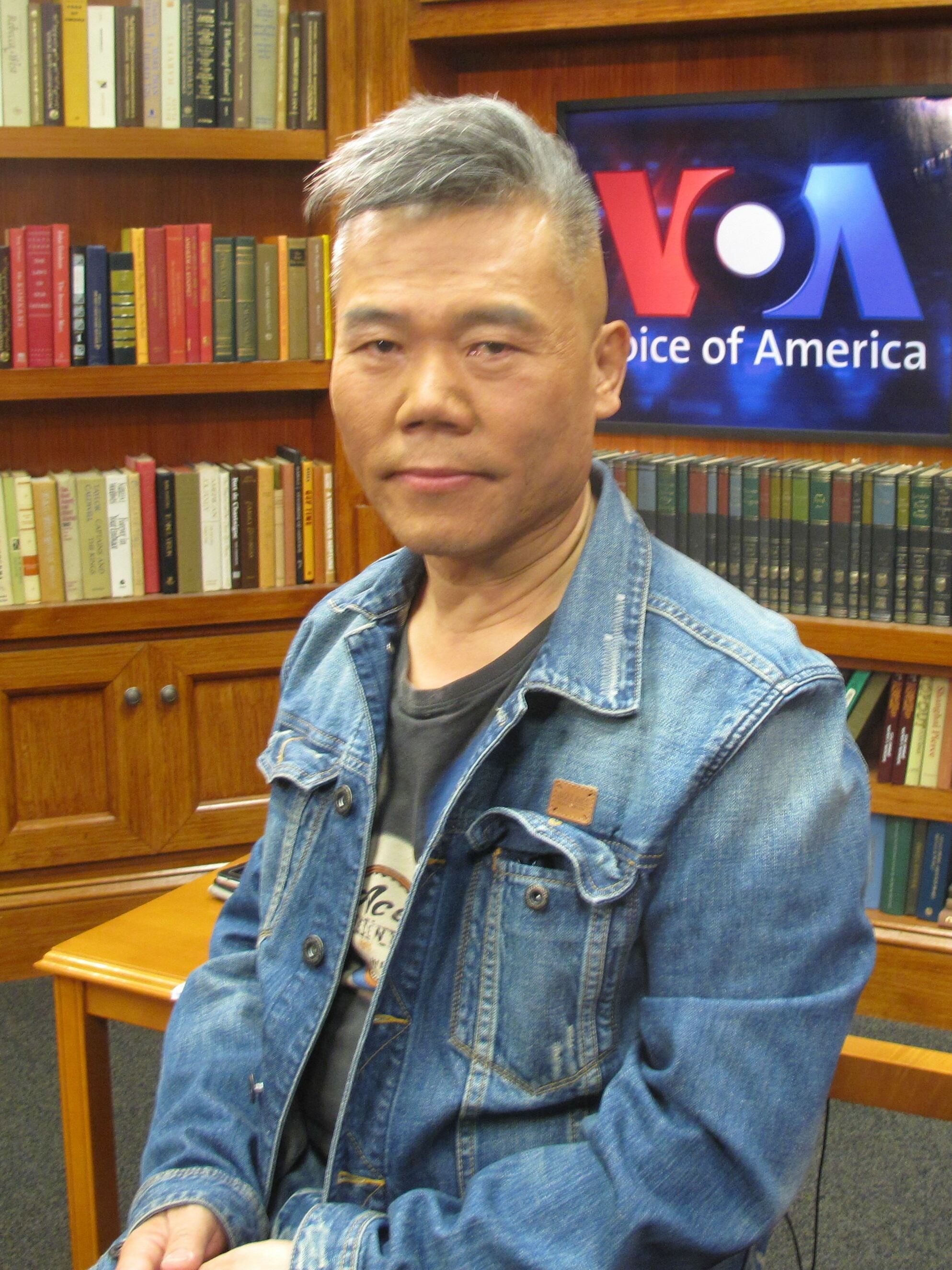
- Sima Nan in November 2012
- Born: Yu Li; 22 June 1956 (age 70); Heilongjiang, China
- Education: Harbin University of Commerce
- Occupations: Television pundit, social commentator, journalist
- Years active: 1985–present
- Notable work: Inside Story of Qigong
- Political party: Chinese Communist Party

Chinese name
- Traditional Chinese: 司馬南
- Simplified Chinese: 司马南
Transcriptions
Standard Mandarin
- Hanyu Pinyin: Sīmǎ Nán

Yu Li (于力), better known by his pen name Sima Nan (Chinese: 司马南; born 22 June 1956), is a Chinese television pundit, social commentator, and journalist. In the early 21st century, he is well known for his staunch support of Chinese Communist Party (CCP) stances and nationalistic, anti-American sentiments. In the late 1990s, he was mostly known for his criticism of pseudoscience and alleged supernatural phenomena, especially his opposition to what he called qigong-related fraud.

== Biography ==
Sima was born to a traditional Chinese medicine doctor in Heilongjiang province, although Shandong is considered his ancestral home. He graduated from Heilongjiang College of Business at the end of 1981, after which he was assigned to work for the central government in Beijing. He had worked a variety of jobs since, notably as a journalist and television producer. He is a member of the CCP since 1977.

== Filmography ==
=== Television ===
Year	English title	Chinese title	Role	Notes
1992	I Love My Family	我愛我家	Master Sima	
1995	The Father	爸爸	Qigong master	
1997	Lao Dou bar	老窦酒吧	Himself	
1999	Big Winner	大赢家	General manager	
2007	Gaokao	高考一家亲	Scholar	Researcher of the Institute of History, Chinese Academy of Social Sciences
2009	Police's Stories	派出所的故事	Chi Linfeng	
2009	Xu Beihong	徐悲鸿	Iwasa Jiro	
2009	Investment	投资	Hu Teng	
2009	Dream By Your Side	梦想在你身边	Lao Luo	
2011	Raise Head and See Bliss	抬头见喜	Director Sun	

== Publications ==
- 神功内幕 [Inside Story of Qigong] (in Chinese).
- 太乙宫黑幕 [Inside Story of the Taiyi Palace] (in Chinese). Beijing: China Society Press. 1998. ISBN 9787801460295.
- 我是司马南 [I'm Sima Nan] (in Chinese). Beijing: China Times Economic Publishing House. 2002. ISBN 9787801693013.
- 民主胡同40条 [40 Democratic Hutongs] (in Chinese). Beijing: Economic Science Press. 2011. ISBN 9787514101522.

== Views and activism ==
=== As a political commentator ===
The Wall Street Journal describes Sima as "one of China's most divisive advocates of neo-Maoist ideology", whereas Reuters characterized him as "Communist Party defender". Sima has been described as a Chinese New Left, and is among the best-known advocates of ousted political leader Bo Xilai's "Chongqing Model". Online, Chinese netizens consider him an "anti-America warrior", as a typical entry on Sima's microblog reads: "America is the enemy of all the people in the world... It’s like a giant tumor. Its military bases are all around the world. All wars after World War II were instigated, engineered or started by America...”

In 2011, Sima was invited by the Workers' Party of Korea to attend the 100th Anniversary of Kim Il Sung's birth. After viewing the military parade, Sima enthused: " Not only should North Koreans love Kim Jong Un, people from every nation should love their leaders."

Bo's top lieutenant, Wang Lijun, was an admirer of Sima. In June 2011, Wang invited Sima to give a lecture on "ideological media voice" to 1800 policemen in Chongqing. During their meeting, Wang claimed he read Sima's writings "everyday".

During the general secretaryship of Xi Jinping, Sima's radical views have become part of the mainstream of Chinese politics.

In August 2022, he admitted that back in 2010, his family had bought a house in California for US$257,000. This made him a target of widespread ridicule, with commentators saying "being anti-American is work, living in America is life" (反美是工作、留美是生活). For unknown reasons, he was blocked in Chinese social media in August 2022. His accounts were later reinstated on 27 August.

On 4 July 2023, he attended the American Independence Day dinner hosted by the US Embassy in China where also met with US Ambassador to China R. Nicholas Burns. Sima's attendance of the dinner was mocked by Chinese social media users who accused him of being hypocritical, as the day before the event he had criticized the US proposal to provide Ukraine with cluster bombs during the Russian invasion as "an act against humanity."

On 9 November 2024, South China Morning Post reported that Sima was banned from Chinese social media platforms for a year. In March 2025, the Chinese State Taxation Administration fined him CN¥ 9.27 million for tax evasion. Although Sima said he would accept responsibility, he also suggested that his Multi-channel network (MCN) firm had failed to withheld taxes for him, a claim denied by his MCN firm.

==== War on liberal Western ideas ====
In 2008, Sima waged an Internet war against Chinese commentators and intellectuals he says have hijacked this year's national dramas to undermine CCP rule and patriotic values. He targeted two of the nation's most widely read and combative newspapers, Southern Weekend and Southern Metropolis Daily, accusing them of promoting "Westernization" and liberal beliefs. He also accused the paper of writing favorably of Amnesty International and other groups critical of the Beijing Olympics and China's authoritarian government.

In September 2008, following the Beijing Olympics, Sima was interviewed by the BBC, and defended Chinese censorship regulations and the media firewall on Falun Gong in mainland China. Sima said that the group disseminates material that is blatantly "anti-China" in nature and that the Chinese public has long grown irritated with "Falun Gong rhetoric." In another interview with The Daily Telegraph, Sima says that China is not ready for personal freedom, nor suited to one man, one vote. Liberals, he claims, want to do away with "Chineseness" and turn the country into a pale imitation of the West. After Charter 08 came out, Sima wrote on his blog that the charter was a dangerous attempt to promote a Chinese "color revolution", referring to pro-democracy movements in Ukraine and Georgia.

In April 2011, days after Ai Weiwei was arrested by the Chinese government, Sima attended a web show denouncing him. Sima claimed that Ai's fame was due to his anti-China stance, and Ai received foreign funding to subvert China. Sima warned that if "Ai had his way, China will be worse". Upon learning Sima's accusations, Ai's mother challenged Sima to show evidence backing his claims.

==== Incidents ====
On 20 January 2012, Sima boarded a plane to Washington, DC, United States. At some point after arriving at Dulles International Airport, Sima leaned over the handrail of an escalator and got his head stuck between the rail and an approaching section of wall. He was rushed to hospital and received prompt treatment. The fact that a pundit who made a career out of bashing the United States quietly traveled there on the eve of Chinese New Year invited suspicions of hypocrisy and a deluge of ridicule on Chinese social networking sites. It was rumored Sima was in the U.S. to visit his wife and child living there, to which Sima did not deny, but emphasized privacy.

In October 2012, when giving a lecture at Hainan University, Sima Nan had a shoe thrown at him by a student. The episode occurred during the Q & A period. Arguing that Sima's Maoist views were a threat to freedom, the student quoted Socrates before hurling his sneaker to Sima, to the cheers of a packed auditorium.

=== As a skeptic ===
==== Qigong ====
Sima studied qigong while at college. His biography published in the Skeptical Inquirer states that he was influenced by the book Human Body Science (Chinese: 人体科学) by China's leading physicist Qian Xuesen. As a result, he became involved in the Chinese Human Body Science Association, through which he had an opportunity to witness demonstrations of the prominent masters of the time, for whom he used to run errands. Sima says this included transferring title of property the masters received from grateful followers. By 1990, he says he became disillusioned with the deception practiced by the qigong masters he had come into contact with, and found that the Qigong Science Research Association had little to do with serious research but was in fact interested in gaining influence and financial reward. Later, however, he was denounced as a "traitor" and expelled from the Human Body Science Association.

Sima says that the government had been harassing him until 1999, when the official policy on qigong underwent a reversal. Sima says he is motivated only by the satisfaction of unmasking cheats who he says prey on uneducated Chinese. His Skeptics biography alleged that, during the golden decade of qigong, the qigong network had sought to influence the highest level of the country's leadership. Governmental departments set up qigong research and development units and invested large sums of money for that purpose; people of all socioeconomic levels were deceived, in his view.

==== Falun Gong ====
According to The Wall Street Journal's Ian Johnson, Sima was an obscure debunker of charlatans who shot to stardom following the state's 1999 crackdown on Falun Gong. In the six weeks since the CCP banned the spiritual practice, Sima became a hot commodity, "jetting around the country at the behest of party bosses who hope the self-styled cultbuster can root out believers". He was even given a national "hero of atheism" award.

Demand for Sima's consulting services increased following the ban of Falun Gong; He traveled around the country to give lectures. Sima said that although he supported the government's ban on Falun Gong, he was ambivalent about the government's vitriolic campaign against the practice and the hundreds of arrests. In 2000, The Globe and Mail reported that Sima had been asked by the Canadian government to assist them in combating illegal immigration from China: faced with many boat people arriving on Canada's west coast from China who claim persecution as members of Falun Gong in order to gain refugee status, the Canadians are hoping for help in assessing the applications.

==== Supernatural phenomena ====
Sima referred to ufologists as "romantics", saying that those who alleged to have seen UFOs or have had extraterrestrial encounters, all lack hard evidence to prove their claims via objective and scientific methods.

==== Association with others ====
Sima Nan is a friend of Fang Zhouzi. In 2006, Sima Nan, He Zuoxiu, Yuan Zhong and Guo Zhengyi established "Anti-Fraud Trust", soliciting donations from the public. The express purpose of the trust was to fund Fang Zhouzi's activities.

== See also ==
- Kong Qingdong
