= Pepijn van Erp =

Dutch mathematician and skeptical activist

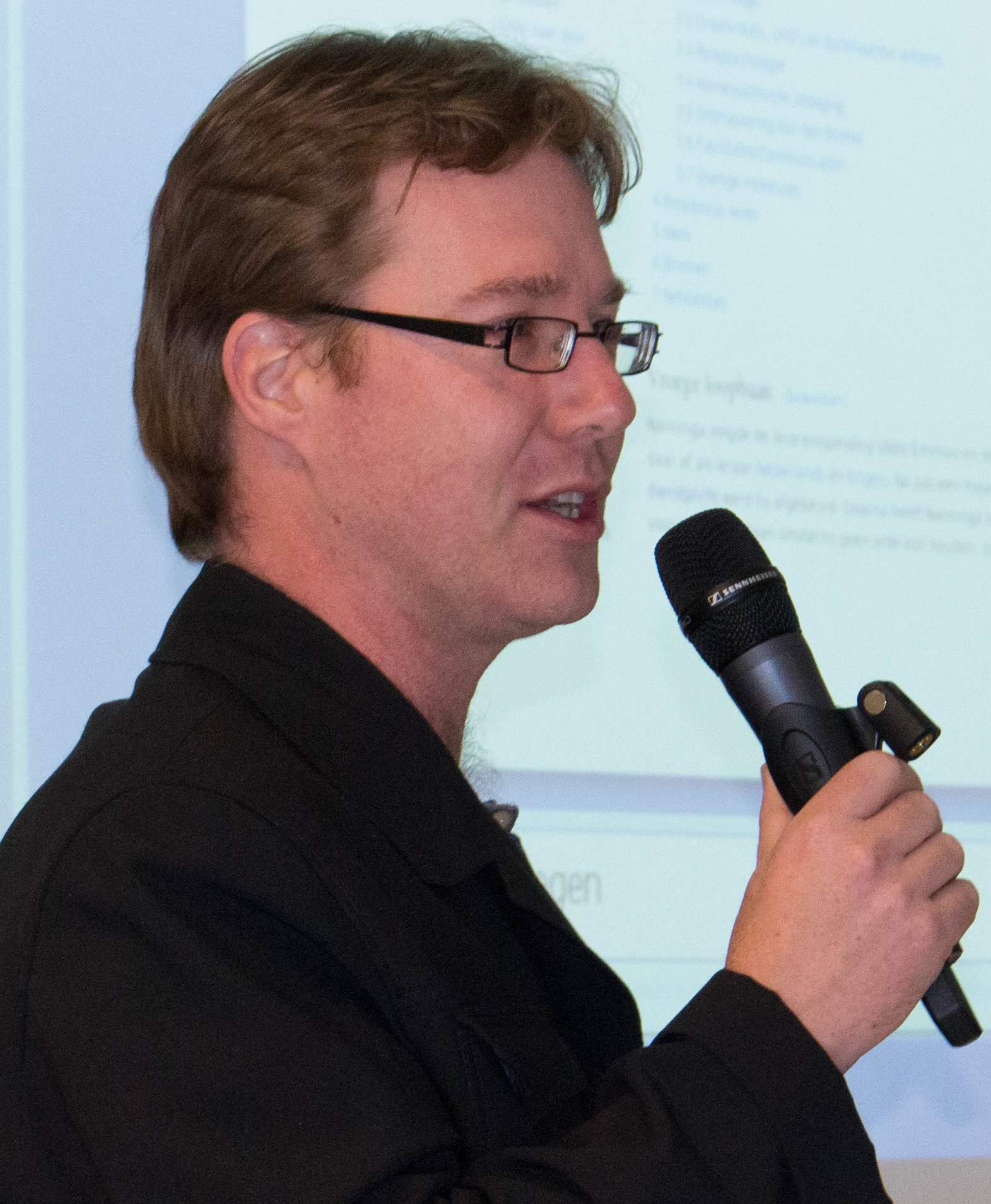
- van Erp in 2014
- Born: 1972 (age 53–54); Goirle, Netherlands
- Education: Radboud University Nijmegen
- Known for: Investigating and criticising pseudoscience, conspiracy theories and fake news
- Scientific career
- Fields: Mathematics
- Pepijn van Erp's voice Recorded October 2016
- Website: www.pepijnvanerp.nl

Pepijn van Erp (born 1972) is a Dutch mathematician and skeptical activist.

Van Erp studied mathematics at the Radboud University Nijmegen, graduating in 1999. After graduating, Van Erp worked as a statistics consultant at the PTT. Between 2002 and 2005, he lived in Tanzania. Until 2012, Van Erp was secretary at the Stichting Nijmeegs Universitair Fonds (SNUF).

In 2011, Van Erp became involved with Stichting Skepsis, where he has served as board member since March 2012. Over a number of years, he has occupied himself with all sorts of dubious claims to determine whether they are scientific or pseudoscientific in nature.

In February 2013, Van Erp was one of several commentators who accused the editorial staff of talkshow De Wereld Draait Door to uncritically present the story of the heavily handicapped Niek Zervaas, who was alleged to have been able to communicate using facilitated communication, a practice characterised as pseudoscience. The editorial staff later admitted that they had been 'blinded' by the wondrous story of Niek's parents, and should have been more skeptical.

After van Erp criticised the ideas of American-Italian nuclear physicist Ruggero Santilli, the latter sued him, his webhost, and the chairman of Skepsis Foundation in 2016. The suit against the foundation was dismissed in August 2018 and shortly thereafter the suit against van Erp was settled.

In October 2016, the electronics company Philips planned to hold a workshop called "Energy Medicine meets technology" with speakers from companies developing an electroacupuncture device and an app for mapping meridians; after van Erp posted a blog describing his efforts to get information from the companies and criticizing these devices as pseudoscience and quackery, Philips cancelled the workshop.

He is also a chess player.
