= Zhang Gongyao =

Chinese philosopher (born 1956)

Zhang Gongyao (Chinese: 张功耀; pinyin: Zhāng Gōngyào; born November 10, 1956) is a Chinese philosopher. He is a professor in Department of Philosophy, Central South University, China. He promoted the abolition of traditional Chinese medicine.

== Biography ==
Zhang was born in Chenzhou, Hunan in 1956. He received his M.A degree from Zhejiang University in 1988. In 2006, Zhang initiated a movement to call for abolishment of the traditional Chinese medicine.
