= Daniel Dingel =

Filipino inventor

- Born: January 19, 1928; San Fernando, La Union, Philippine Islands
- Died: October 18, 2010 (aged 82); Las Pinas City, Metro Manila
- Occupations: Inventor, engineer
- Known for: alleged inventor of a water-fuelled car

Daniel Dingel (1928–2010) was a Filipino engineer who claimed to have invented a "hydrogen reactor" that could power a water-fuelled car.

== Hydrogen reactor car ==
Dingel said he began working on his hydrogen reactor in 1969, and claimed to have used the device to power his 1996 Toyota Corolla. Dingle claimed that his invention splits hydrogen from water in an onboard water tank, and does not produce any carbon emissions. However, he never revealed the secret to his invention. In an interview with the Philippine Daily Inquirer, Dingel said that he would be willing to reveal the secret of his invention if the buyer would hire 200 Filipinos and their families.

Dingel was known as a vocal critic of Filipino government officials and scientists who refused to support his invention. The Philippines Department of Science and Technology, in turn, has declared his invention a hoax.

== Investment by Formosa Plastics Group and estafa case ==
In November 2000, John Ding Young of Formosa Plastics Group (FPG) sought Dingel out and, convinced that the invention was genuine, signed a "preliminary understanding" with him for several projects. He aimed to have business partners, get an international patent, and commercialize his technology.

In December 2008, Dingel became even more controversial when he was found guilty and sentenced to a maximum of 20 years imprisonment in an estafa (swindling) case filed against him by Young and FPG. In a decision dated December 9, 2008, Judge Rolando How of the Parañaque Regional Trial Court's Branch 257 found him guilty of taking $410,000 from FPG, saying that Dingel "defrauded Young when the inventor failed to fulfill his obligation of developing his 'hydrogen reactor' and creating experimental cars in 2000."

Young claimed that Dingel signed a joint venture agreement with FPG, and initially received $30,000 in goodwill money and $20,000 for research and development. Young said that Dingel then visited the FPG headquarters in Taipei and asked for $300,000 so he could purchase three cars which he would use as prototypes when he returned to the Philippines. Young added that in September 2001 he sent another $60,000 in additional funds, as agreed upon in the joint venture agreement.

Former Solicitor General of the Philippines Francisco Chavez, whom Dingel asked to serve as his counsel, said that he would appeal the court decision before it became final on Christmas Eve 2008.

Dingel died on October 18, 2010, in Las Pinas City, Metro Manila in the Philippines.
