= Stanley A. Meyer =

American scenic designer (born 1958)

- Occupations: Scenic designer, production designer, and illustrator
- Known for: Disney's Beauty and the Beast

Stanley A. Meyer (born March 13, 1958) is an American scenic designer, production designer, and illustrator. Perhaps best known for designing the original Broadway production of Disney's Beauty and the Beast (1994), Meyer has notably worked across Broadway, West End, international, and regional theatre. His work also extends to theme park attractions, arena and ice shows, parade floats, concert tours, and book illustration.

== Early life and education ==
Growing up, Meyer came from a family of limited means. He spent childhood summers at the bay in Belmont Shore, California, where his parents arranged swimming lessons before he could walk.

In high school, Meyer became a member of the Future Farmers of America. He was elected State Reporter for the California Association of FFA from 1976 to 1977, a position that included speaking engagements and service as a delegate to the FFA National Convention in Kansas City. During his time in FFA, he also raised a dairy heifer and won showmanship awards.

While in high school, Meyer began studying landscape design, horticulture, and floriculture. At the local Hemet Farmers Fair, he won first prize for a Polynesian-themed landscape design featuring anthuriums.

Meyer went on to attend Mt. San Jacinto College, studying theatre, dance, and acting. During his undergraduate years, he played the title role in Godspell and also sang in a barbershop quartet called The Undertones. Meyer transferred to and eventually graduated from California State University, Long Beach. He then went to Mason Gross School of the Arts at Rutgers University on scholarship.

== Career ==
=== Grove Shakespeare Festival and early work ===
During collegiate summers, Meyer worked at the Grove Shakespeare Festival in Garden Grove, California. He advanced from Scenic Artist and Charge Artist to becoming Assistant Designer, and later leading as Scenic Designer.

Meyer’s first scenic design for the company was The Merry Wives of Windsor in 1987. Built around miniature houses tilted at unusual angles, the design won a Los Angeles Drama-Logue Award. Jack Holland’s review for the production in Drama-Logue described Meyer's set as inventive.

Meyer went on to design King Lear, The Comedy of Errors, A Midsummer Night's Dream, and The Two Gentlemen of Verona for the festival, receiving additional Drama-Logue Awards for The Comedy of Errors and The Two Gentlemen of Verona. Sylvie Drake’s review in the Los Angeles Times singled out the gnarled-root set Stanley created for A Midsummer Night's Dream; and Polly Warfield’s review in Drama-Logue described the same design as a dappled, color-washed forest glade with roots ascending to form a staircase.

In 1986, Meyer was admitted to United Scenic Artists Local 829 after passing the union's scenic design examination in Los Angeles.

=== Disneyland ===
Meyer went on to work as an Art Director at Disneyland, helping to create stage shows, parades, and special events. Meyer’s Disneyland credits include the original musicals Plane Crazy! (Videopolis stage at Disneyland) and Dick Tracy in Diamond Double Cross (Disney's Hollywood Studios at Walt Disney World). Meyer also designed Mickey's Nutcracker, which was filmed for the Disney Channel. The position brought him into direct working contact with Disney executives Michael Eisner, Frank Wells, and Jeffrey Katzenberg.

=== Early New York work ===
During the 1980s, Meyer made his Off-Broadway debut with designs for The Marriage of Bette and Boo and Cloud 9 at the Nat Horne Theatre on Theatre Row in Manhattan. He also designed The Everafters and the Festival of One Act Comedies for Manhattan Punch Line Theatre. Upon joining the union, he designed The Secret Garden for TheatreWorksUSA. Other credits from this period include In Trousers, March of the Falsettos, Titanic, A Day in Hollywood, A Night in the Ukraine, and Marry Me a Little.

=== Disney's Beauty and the Beast ===
In 1992, Meyer was part of the creative team that pitched a stage adaptation of the animated film Beauty and the Beast to Michael Eisner and Frank Wells in Aspen, Colorado. Presenting approximately 140 black-and-white and 8 full-color scene-by-scene renderings, the resulting production, Disney's Beauty and the Beast, had its world premiere at Theatre Under the Stars in Houston, Texas before opening on Broadway at the Palace Theatre in 1994. Disney's Beauty and the Beast was the Walt Disney Company's first Broadway musical, and Meyer's design work contributed to the establishment of Disney Theatrical Group. The Broadway production later transferred to the Lunt-Fontanne Theatre, where the reduced backstage space required the use of the scenery for the First National Tour.

Meyer's scenic design for Disney's Beauty and the Beast won a Los Angeles Drama-Logue Award and received nominations from the American Theatre Wing Design Award, the New York Outer Critics Circle Award, and the Los Angeles Ovation Award. In 2001, Meyer became the first recipient of the League of American Theatres and Producers' National Broadway Award for his design of the North American tour.

Stanley went on to design subsequent national and international productions of the show. For the production's 25th anniversary, producers Thomas Schumacher and Anne Quart brought back members of the original creative team. Meyer redesigned the production, including new digital backdrops. He also introduced large moving architectural "scrolls" that transition on curvilinear paths to suggest the enchanted castle. Much of the design was developed remotely over video conference during the COVID-19 pandemic. The 25th Anniversary production was directed and choreographed by Matt West. Ahead of a West End run, technical rehearsals were held in Bristol, England. This U.K. production subsequently toured Australia, and the same creative team also worked on the 30th Anniversary U.S. National Tour.

=== Other theatre ===
Following Disney's Beauty and the Beast, Meyer designed the World Premiere of Elton John and Tim Rice's Aida for Disney Theatrical Group. Originally titled Elaborate Lives: The Legend of Aida, the work premiered at the Alliance Theatre in Atlanta. Meyer’s other World Premiere theatre credits include WarholCapote (American Repertory Theater, directed by Michael Mayer.) Treasure Island, A New Musical (Arkansas Repertory Theatre, directed by Brett Smock), and Joe Bard's Zoz! The Bard of Dublin Liberties (CSULB).

He designed the 2001 Buenos Aires production of Little Shop of Horrors (Alejandro Romay Theatrical Productions), the 2015 American premiere of Saturday Night Fever (Finger Lakes Musical Theatre Festival), The New Nutcracker in 2016 (Lone Star Ballet in Amarillo, Texas), and the North American premiere of From Here to Eternity in 2016—his third collaboration with Tim Rice.

Meyer has a rich history with Syracuse Stage, designing The Three Musketeers alongside Artistic Director Robert M. Hupp in his directorial debut at the theatre. His design received a Syracuse Area Live Theatre (SALT) Award for Best Scenic Design. In 2024, Stanley returned to Syracuse Stage to design Dial M for Murder, his first realistic period interior set.

Meyer also contributed to Buzz!!, a developmental Las Vegas musical about director-choreographer Busby Berkeley, with songs by Alan Menken and David Zippel.

=== Concert tours ===
In the world of concert tours, Meyer designed production for Cyndi Lauper's True Colors tour in 2007. He designed Alice Cooper's 2007 and 2009 world tours, as well as the 2010 Theatre of Death tour. He also designed three tours for the Steve Miller Band: the 2010 Bingo! tour, a 2012 world tour, and a 2014 tour co-headlined with Journey.

=== Parade design ===
Meyer has designed numerous floats for the Tournament of Roses Parade in Pasadena, California. Working with Fiesta Parade Floats, his first float was titled A Sea of Surprises, marking SeaWorld's 50th anniversary, and receiving the 2014 President's Award for most outstanding use and presentation of flowers.

Subsequently, Stanley has received the 2015 Queen's Award for The Bachelor: Inspiring Love, the 2015 Extraordinaire Award for Kiehl's: Inspiring a Beautiful World, and the 2015 Sweepstakes Award (the parade's top honor) for a float designed for Dole Food Company.

=== Illustration ===
Stanley A. Meyer is the illustrator for 101 Things I Hate About Your House, an interior design book written by James Swan and Carol Beggy, with illustrations incorporating the pets of the authors and collaborators. Meyer is also the key art illustrator for the new musical Winnie-the-Pooh: Forever Friends, premiering at First Stage in Minneapolis, MN in January 2027.

== Awards and nominations ==
Category, Awarding body	Award	Result	Work
Best Scenic Design for a Musical, Disney Theatrical Group	The League of American Theatres and Producers National Broadway Award	Winner	Beauty and the Beast (2001 North America Tour)
Best Scenic Design for a Musical, Disney Theatrical Group	American Theatre Wing Design Award	Nominee	Beauty and the Beast
Outstanding Scenic Design for a Musical, Disney Theatrical Group	Los Angeles Drama Logue Award	Winner	Beauty and the Beast
Best Scenic Design for a Musical, Disney Theatrical Group	New York Outer Critics Circle Award	Nominee	Beauty and the Beast
Best Scenic Design for a Musical, Disney Theatrical Group	Los Angeles Ovation Award	Nominee	Beauty and the Beast
Best Outdoor Nighttime Spectacular, Universal Studios Japan	THEA Award	Winner	Peter Pan's Neverland
Outstanding Achievement - Indoor Marine Waterpark, SeaWorld Abu Dhabi, Yas Island, UAE	THEA Award	Winner	
Best Outdoor Daytime Spectacular, SeaWorld & InMotion Entertainment	IAPPA Brass Ring Award	Winner	Blue Horizons
Outstanding Scenic Design, Grove Shakespeare Festival	Los Angeles Drama Logue Award	Winner	The Merry Wives of Windsor
Outstanding Scenic Design, Grove Shakespeare Festival	Los Angeles Drama Logue Award	Winner	The Comedy of Errors
Outstanding Scenic Design, Grove Shakespeare Festival	Los Angeles Drama Logue Award	Winner	The Two Gentlemen of Verona
Best Scenic Design, Syracuse Stage	SALT Syracuse Area LIve Theatre Award	Winner	The Three Musketeers
Most Outstanding Use and Presentation of Flowers, Tournament of Roses Parade (2014)	President Award	Winner	SeaWorld: Sea of Surprises
Most Outstanding Presentation of Roses, Tournament of Roses Parade (2015)	Queen Award	Winner	The Bachelor: Inspiring Love
Most Extraordinary Float^{(*Including floats that do not retract to 55')*}, Tournament of Roses Parade (2015)	Extraordinaire Award	Winner	Kiehl's: Inspiring a Beautiful World
Top Award in the Parade - Most Beautiful Entry, Encompassing Float Design, Floral Presentation and Entertainment, Tournament of Roses Parade (2015)	Sweepstakes Award	Winner	Dole: Rhythm of Hawaii
Most Outstanding Artistic Design and Use of Floral and Non-Floral Materials, Tournament of Roses Parade (2016)	Director Award	Winner	Dole: Soaring Over Paradise
Most Outstanding Use and Presentation of Flowers, Tournament of Roses Parade (2016)	President Award	Winner	The Bachelor: Love is the Greatest Journey
Most Outstanding Creative Concept and Float Design, Tournament of Roses Parade (2016)	Grand Marshal Award	Winner	Kaiser Permanente: Helping Mother Nature Thrive
Most Outstanding Imagination & Innovation to Advance the Art of Float Design, Tournament of Roses Parade (2016)	Crown City Innovator Award	Winner	Kiehl's: The Beauty of Adventure
Best Depiction of Life in California, Tournament of Roses Parade (2016)	Governor Award	Winner	Miracle-Gro: Life Starts Here
Most Outstanding Use and Presentation of Flowers, Tournament of Roses Parade (2016)	President Award	Winner	Northwestern Mutual: Dancing into Adventure
Top Award in the Parade - Most Beautiful Entry, Encompassing Float Design, Floral Presentation and Entertainment, Tournament of Roses Parade (2017)	Sweepstakes Award	Winner	Dole: Spirit of Hawaii
Most Outstanding Presentation of Roses, Tournament of Roses Parade (2017)	Queen Award	Winner	Miracle-Gro: Everything’s Coming Up Roses
Most Outstanding Use of Animation, Tournament of Roses Parade (2017)	Animation Award	Winner	Northwestern Mutual: Waves of Hope
Most Outstanding Use and Presentation of Flowers, Tournament of Roses Parade (2017)	President's Award	Winner	The Bachelor: Echoes of Love
Most Outstanding Creative Concept and Float Design, Tournament of Roses Parade (2018)	Grand Marshal Award	Winner	Dole: Sharing Nature's Bounty
Most Whimsical and Amusing Float, Tournament of Roses Parade (2018)	Bob Hope Humor Award	Winner	Northwestern Mutual: Letting Kids Be Kids
Most Outstanding Depiction of Life in California, Tournament of Roses Parade (2018)	Golden State Award	Winner	The City of Riverside/The Mission Inn: 25th Annual Festival of Lights
Most Outstanding Use of Animation, Tournament of Roses Parade (2018)	Animation Award	Winner	Underground Service Alert: Making It Safe for All
Most Outstanding Innovation in the Use of Floral and Non-Floral Materials, Tournament of Roses Parade (2019)	Past President Award	Winner	Dig Alert: Backyard Harmony
Most Outstanding Display of Floral Presentation, Float Design and Entertainment, Tournament of Roses Parade (2019)	Wrigley Legacy Award	Winner	Dole: Rhythm of Paradise
Most Whimsical and Amusing Float, Tournament of Roses Parade (2019)	Bob Hope Humor Award	Winner	Northwestern Mutual: Spend Your Life Living
Most Outstanding Display of Floral Presentation, Float Design and Entertainment, Tournament of Roses Parade (2020)	Wrigley Legacy Award	Winner	Kaiser Permanente: Courage to Reimagine
Most Outstanding Display of Fantasy and Imagination, Tournament of Roses Parade (2020)	Fantasy Award	Winner	Northwestern Mutual: Spend Your Life Living
