= Oxyhydrogen =

Explosive mixture of hydrogen and oxygen gases

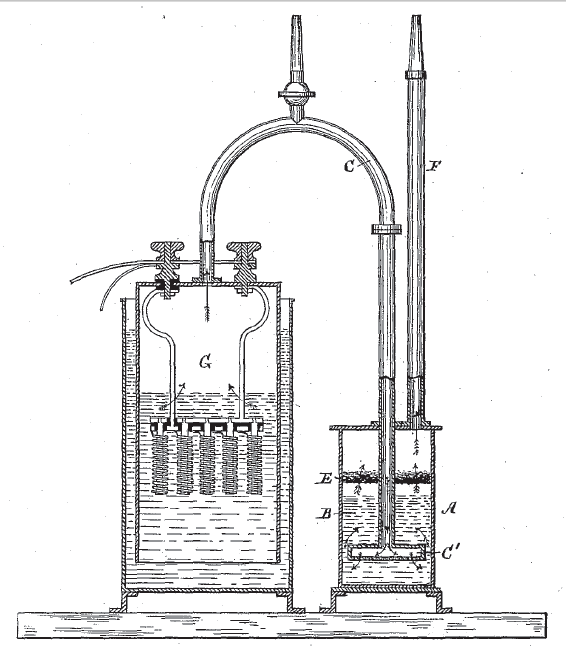
Nineteenth-century electrolytic cell for producing oxyhydrogen

Oxyhydrogen is a mixture of hydrogen (H_{2}) and oxygen (O_{2}) gases. This gaseous mixture is used for torches to process refractory materials and was the first gaseous mixture used for welding. Theoretically, a ratio of 2:1 hydrogen:oxygen is enough to achieve maximum efficiency; in practice a ratio 4:1 or 5:1 is needed to avoid an oxidizing flame.

This mixture may also be referred to as Knallgas (Scandinavian and German Knallgas; lit. 'bang-gas'), although some authors define knallgas to be a generic term for the mixture of fuel with the precise amount of oxygen required for complete combustion, thus 2:1 oxyhydrogen would be called "hydrogen-knallgas".

"Brown's gas" and HHO are terms for oxyhydrogen originating in pseudoscience, although x H_{2} + y O_{2} is preferred due to HHO meaning H_{2}O.

== Properties ==
Oxyhydrogen will combust when brought to its autoignition temperature. For the stoichiometric mixture in air, at normal atmospheric pressure, autoignition occurs at about 570 °C (1,058 °F). At standard temperature and pressure, the minimum energy required to ignite such a mixture with a spark is about 0.007 mJ and it can burn when it is between about 4% and 95% hydrogen by volume.

When ignited, the gas mixture converts to water vapor and releases energy, which sustains the reaction: 241.8 kJ of energy (LHV) for every mole of H_{2} burned. The amount of heat energy released is independent of the mode of combustion, but the temperature of the flame varies. The maximum temperature of about 2,800 °C (5,100 °F) is achieved with an exact stoichiometric mixture, about 700 °C (1,300 °F) hotter than a hydrogen flame in air. When either of the gases are mixed in excess of this ratio, or when mixed with an inert gas like nitrogen, the heat must spread throughout a greater quantity of matter, reducing flame temperature.

Oxyhydrogen is explosive and can detonate when ignited, releasing a large amount of energy. This is often demonstrated in classroom environments in which teachers fill a balloon with the gas, due to the easy access of hydrogen and oxygen.

== Production by electrolysis ==
A precisely stoichiometric mixture may be obtained by water electrolysis, which uses an electric current to dissociate the water molecules:

Electrolysis: 2 H_{2}O → 2 H_{2} + O_{2}
Combustion: 2 H_{2} + O_{2} → 2 H_{2}O

William Nicholson was the first to decompose water in this manner in 1800. In theory, the input energy of a closed system always equals the output energy, as the first law of thermodynamics states. However, in practice no systems are perfectly closed, and the energy required to generate the oxyhydrogen always exceeds the energy released by combusting it, even at maximum practical efficiency, as the second law of thermodynamics implies (see Electrolysis of water#Efficiency).

== Applications ==
Limelights used an oxyhydrogen flame as a high-temperature heat source

=== Lighting ===
Many forms of oxyhydrogen lamps have been described, such as the limelight, which used an oxyhydrogen flame to heat a piece of quicklime to white hot incandescence. Because of the explosiveness of the oxyhydrogen, limelights have been replaced by electric lighting.

=== Oxyhydrogen blowpipe ===
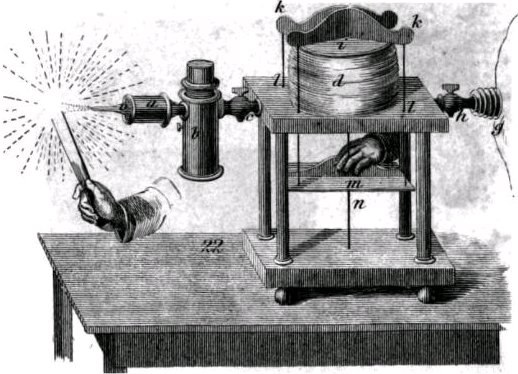
Nineteenth-century bellows-operated oxy-hydrogen blowpipe, including two different types of flashback arrestor

The foundations of the oxy-hydrogen blowpipe were laid down by Carl Wilhelm Scheele and Joseph Priestley around the last quarter of the eighteenth century. The oxy-hydrogen blowpipe itself was developed by the Frenchman Bochard-de-Saron, the English mineralogist Edward Daniel Clarke and the American chemist Robert Hare in the late 18th and early 19th centuries. It produced a flame hot enough to melt such refractory materials as platinum, porcelain, fire brick, and corundum, and was a valuable tool in several fields of science. It is used in the Verneuil process to produce synthetic corundum.

=== Oxyhydrogen torch ===
An oxyhydrogen torch (also known as hydrogen torch) is an oxy-gas torch that burns hydrogen (the fuel) with oxygen (the oxidizer). It is used for cutting and welding metals, glasses, and thermoplastics.

Due to competition from arc welding and other oxy-fuel torches such as the acetylene-fueled cutting torch, the oxyhydrogen torch is seldom used today, but it remains the preferred cutting tool in some niche applications.

Oxyhydrogen was once used in working platinum, because at the time, only it could burn hot enough to melt the metal 1,768.3 °C (3,214.9 °F). These techniques have been superseded by the electric arc furnace.

== Pseudoscientific claims ==
Oxyhydrogen is associated with various exaggerated claims. It is often called "Brown's gas" or "HHO gas", a term popularized by fringe physicist Ruggero Santilli, who claimed that his HHO gas, produced by a special apparatus, is "a new form of water", with new properties, based on his fringe theory of "magnecules".

Many other pseudoscientific claims have been made about oxyhydrogen, like an ability to neutralize radioactive waste, help plants to germinate, and more.

Oxyhydrogen is often mentioned in conjunction with vehicles that claim to use water as a fuel. The most common and decisive counter-argument against producing this gas on board to use as a fuel or fuel additive is that more energy is always needed to split water molecules than is recouped by burning the resulting gas. Additionally, the volume of gas that can be produced for on-demand consumption through electrolysis is very small in comparison to the volume consumed by an internal combustion engine.

An article in Popular Mechanics in 2008 reported that oxyhydrogen does not increase the fuel economy in automobiles.

"Water-fueled" cars should not be confused with hydrogen-fueled cars, where the hydrogen is produced elsewhere and used as an energy carrier, or where hydrogen is used as fuel enhancement.
