= Hydrogen fuel enhancement =

Process to improve fuel economy, power output, or emissions

Hydrogen fuel enhancement is the process of using a mixture of hydrogen and conventional hydrocarbon fuel in an internal combustion engine, typically in a car or truck, in an attempt to improve fuel economy, power output, emissions, or a combination thereof. Methods include hydrogen produced through an electrolysis, storing hydrogen on the vehicle as a second fuel, or reforming conventional fuel into hydrogen with a catalyst.

There has been a great deal of research into fuel mixtures, such as gasoline and nitrous oxide injection. Mixtures of hydrogen and hydrocarbons are no exception. These sources say that contamination from exhaust gases has been reduced in all cases, and they suggest that a small efficiency increase is sometimes possible.

Many of these sources also suggest that modifications to the engine's air-fuel ratio, ignition timing, emissions control systems, electronic control systems and possibly other design elements, might be required in order to obtain any significant results. A modified vehicle in this way may not pass mandatory anti-smog controls. Due to the inherent complexity of these subsystems, a necessity of modern engine design and emissions standards, such claims made by proponents of hydrogen fuel enhancement are difficult to substantiate and always disputed.

To date, hydrogen fuel enhancement products have not been specifically addressed by the United States Environmental Protection Agency, as no research devices or commercial products have reports available as per the "Motor Vehicle Aftermarket Retrofit Device Evaluation Program." They do, however, point out that installation of such devices often involves illegally tampering with an automobile's emissions control system, which could result in significant fines.

Environment Canada does have a research paper on the subject. In tests done in their laboratory in 2004 they found no improvement in engine efficiency or fuel economy.

There are also many aftermarket kits available for sale outside of the US. The fitting of these kits outside the US may not contravene laws in those countries where fitted.

== Electrolysis ==
Hydrogen fuel enhancement from electrolysis (using automotive alternators) has been promoted for use with gasoline-powered and diesel trucks, although electrolysis-based designs have repeatedly failed efficiency tests and contradict widely accepted laws of thermodynamics (i.e. conservation of energy). Proponents, who sell the units (often called "HHO devices"), claim that the dynamics are often misconstrued, and due to the chemical properties of the resulting mixture, it is possible to gain efficiency increases in a manner that does not violate any scientific laws. Many tests by consumer watch groups have shown negative results. This technique may seem appealing to some at first because it is easy to overlook energy losses in the system as a whole. Those unfamiliar with electrodynamics may not realize that the electrolytic cell drains current from a car's electrical system, causing an increase in mechanical resistance in the alternator that will always result in a net power reduction. Since it requires more energy to separate hydrogen from oxygen than would be gained from burning the hydrogen produced in this method, the concept of such a device is often stated to be in direct violation of the first and second laws of thermodynamics. Monetary prizes have been offered to sellers or promoters of these devices to demonstrate their claims of increased fuel economy are true, with very few sellers taking the challenges and no device passing the challenges.

== Catalysis ==
Arvin Meritor, a Tier 1 supplier of automotive technology, at one time, was experimenting with a plasma reformer technology which would use hydrogen produced from the fuel to enhance engine combustion efficiency and reduce emissions of NO_{x}. This reference states that a 20% to 30% increase in engine thermal efficiency is possible. However, this requires that the engine should be modified to operate in the ultra-lean region of the plot of compression ratio vs. air/fuel equivalence ratio (lambda), along with other modifications. This technology would not work well as a retrofit to unmodified engine technology. This research was conducted in conjunction with the Sloan Automotive Laboratory at MIT. Eventually, the division conducting this research was sold off to an equity investment firm.

== See also ==
- Water-fuelled car
- Combined cycle hydrogen power plant
