= Ruggero Santilli =

Italian physicist

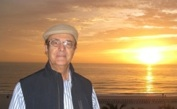
- Born: September 8, 1935 (age 91); Capracotta, Molise, Italy
- Education: University of Naples, University of Turin
- Known for: Fringe science
- Spouse: Carla
- Scientific career
- Fields: Theoretical physics
- Workplaces: Institute for Basic Research

Ruggero Maria Santilli (born September 8, 1935) is an Italo-American nuclear physicist. Mainstream scientists dismiss his theories as fringe science.

== Biography ==
Ruggero Maria Santilli was born September 8, 1935) in Capracotta. He studied physics at the University of Naples and earned his PhD in physics from the University of Turin, graduating in 1965. He held various academic positions in Italy until 1967, when he took a position at University of Miami; a year later he moved to Boston University, and subsequently held visiting scientist positions at Massachusetts Institute of Technology and Harvard University.

In September 1981, Santilli established a one-man organization, the Institute for Basic Research in Boston; he told a reporter from St. Petersburg Times in 2007 that he left Harvard because scientists there viewed his work as "heresy".

In 1982 Austrian-British philosopher Karl Popper wrote that Santilli's calls for tests on the validity of quantum mechanics within nuclear and hadronic structures, represented a return to scientific sanity.

In 1985 he published a book, Il Grande Grido: Ethical Probe on Einstein's Followers in the U.S.A, an Insider's View, in which he said that in many institutions there is an effective conspiracy to suppress or not investigate novel theories which may conflict with established scientific theories, such as Einstein's theory of relativity. According to Santilli, institutions receive funding and have established entire departments dedicated to long established theories, and so he argues that these same institutions are ill-equipped to challenge their own scientific paradigms with new theories. Santilli claimed that a number of scientists, including Nobel Laureates Sheldon Glashow and Steven Weinberg, conspired to stop him from conducting research which might have led to the inapplicability of part of Einstein's theory of relativity while he was at Harvard. He has complained that papers he has submitted to peer-reviewed American Physical Society journals were rejected because they were controlled by a group of Jewish physicists led by Weinberg. Santilli has filed a number of lawsuits alleging the suppression of his scientific ideas, including a lawsuit against the magazine Infinite Energy.

Santilli worked on new mathematics and new understandings of physics, to address what he saw as unsolved problems in quantum chemistry; he has published papers and books describing new chemical species called "magnecules" that he says are explained by his mathematics and theories. He told the reporter from St. Petersburg Times that the scientific establishment has not accepted this work.

Around 1990 he moved with the institute back to Florida.

In Florida he worked as a consultant and started companies to support the development and commercialization of his work. In 1990 his publishing company, Hadronic Press, Inc, was registered in Florida under the names of Santilli and his wife. It publishes two journals, Hadronic Journal and Algebras, Groups and Geometries, as well as proceedings, monographs, and textbooks.

Santilli consulted for a company called EarthFirst from 1998 to 2001, and after the relationship ended he sent letters to several of EarthFirst's clients saying they were infringing patents he owned on MagneGas. This led to five years of litigation. In 2007 he founded MagneGas Corporation which went public through a reverse merger in early 2008; the reconstituted company acquired a license to Santilli's inventions in the territory of the western hemisphere from a company called Hyfuels, Inc. of which Santilli was the CEO, and later that year directly acquired other patents and trademarks related to MagneGas from Santilli. According to MagneGas' annual report for the financial year ending December 31, 2017, Santilli's son, Ermanno, was the president and CEO, and due to their holdings of preferred stock, "the Santilli Family has the ability to significantly influence all matters requiring approval by stockholders of our company." His wife Carla is a director. Their daughter and Ermanno's sister, Luisa Ingargiola, is a director and was formerly the CFO. Ruggero had no executive or director role, but the licenses with Hyfuels remain in place and he "personally contributed a small refinery" for the company's use.

As of Nov 2nd, 2018, Carla Santilli and Luisa Ingargiola had both resigned from their roles as directors with the company and Ermanno Santilli had stepped down as CEO.

After an explosion at its facility in 2016, the company changed its raw material from organic waste to soybean oil. As of 2018, the company was not profitable; it had revenue from selling its gas to metalworking companies as an alternative to acetylene, and aspired to compete more broadly with natural gas. As of 2018 two people had been killed and one person injured by MagneGas canisters; as of July 2018 the company was under investigation by OSHA as well as the US gas transport regulator.

In 2013, Santilli became involved with another publicly traded company called Thunder Fusion Corporation, formed when a publicly traded shell company acquired intellectual property generated by Santilli around fusion power that had been owned by Hyfuels. The company changed its name to Thunder Energies Corporation in 2014. Thunder Energies said that it developed a telescope that could detect galaxies, asteroids and other objects in space that were made of antimatter, and in early 2016 Santilli announced that the company had taken pictures of otherwise invisible antimatter objects on Earth. Santilli claimed he was able to use the telescope—a standard, commercial telescope re-fitted with concave lenses, to view antimatter galaxies and images that he interpreted as invisible beings. He planned to sell the telescopes to amateur astronomers in America.

In 2016, Santilli sued Dutch mathematician and skeptic Pepijn van Erp, his webhost, and the chairman of Skepsis Foundation over blog postings in which van Erp had criticized Santelli's work as pseudoscience and ridiculous. The suit against the foundation's chairman was dismissed in August 2018 and shortly thereafter the suit against van Erp was settled.

In 2017 an article in Perspectives on Science described Santilli's Institute for Basic Research as follows: "The substance of the IBR's program is more directed at a Kuhnian rather than an institutional revolution but the readiness with which its supporters endorse the idea of a Jewish conspiracy could class it as having revolutionary intent and being norm violating. Its strong leadership style suggests pathological individualism and an emphasis on opposition to mainstream science." It also noted, describing tendencies of advocates for fringe science: "...there is a surprising readiness to discuss the possibility that the resistance of the mainstream to fringe ideas is the consequence of mainstream cabals, particularly, a Jewish conspiracy. The website scientificethics.org, makes allegations of Jewish corruption and scientific gangsterism as a cause of the 'persecut[ion] of the Italian American scientist R. M. Santilli,' leading to the suppression of unorthodox scientific ideas, particularly those that conflict with 'organized Jewish interests on Einstein.'"

== Selected publications ==
- Santilli, Ruggero (1978). Foundations of Theoretical Mechanics: The inverse problem in Newtonian mechanics (PDF). New York: Springer-Verlag. OCLC 9020170.
- Santilli, Ruggero (1983). Foundations of Theoretical Mechanics: Birkhoffian Generalization of Hamiltonian Mechanics (PDF). Berlin: Springer-Verlag. ISBN 978-0-387-09482-3.
- Santilli, Ruggero (1984). Il Grande Grido: Ethical Probe on Einstein's Followers in the U.S.A.: An Insider's View. Louisville: Alpha Pub. ISBN 978-0-931753-00-8.
- Santilli, Ruggero Maria (1997). "Relativistic hadronic mechanics: Nonunitary, axiom-preserving completion of relativistic quantum mechanics". Foundations of Physics. 27 (5): 625–729. Bibcode:1997FoPh...27..625S. doi:10.1007/BF02550172. S2CID 121113126.
- Santilli, Ruggero (2001). Foundations of Hadronic Chemistry: with Applications to New Clean Energies and Fuels. Berlin: Springer. ISBN 978-1-4020-0087-4.
- Santilli, R. M.; Aringazin, A. K. (2004). "Structure and Combustion of Magnegases". Hadronic Journal. 27 (2004): 299–330. arXiv:physics/0112066. Bibcode:2001physics..12066S.
- Santilli, Ruggero (2006). Isodual Theory of Antimatter with Applications to Antigravity, Grand Unification and Cosmology (PDF). Fundamental Theories of Physics. Vol. 151. Springer. Bibcode:2006itaa.book.....S. doi:10.1007/1-4020-4518-2 (inactive 31 July 2025). ISBN 1-4020-4518-2.
