= Science and Technology Daily =

Chinese government newspaper

- Native name: 科技日报
- Type: Daily science and technology newspaper
- Publisher: Ministry of Science and Technology
- Editor: Zhang Jingan
- Founded: 1986
- Language: Chinese
- Headquarters: Beijing
- Website: stdaily.com

Science and Technology Daily (Chinese: 科技日报; pinyin: Kējì rìbào) is the official newspaper of the Ministry of Science and Technology of the People's Republic of China. It is published in Chinese and based in Beijing.

== History ==
It was one of the few Chinese newspapers to cover the 1989 Tiananmen Square protests and massacre.

In March 2018, Science and Technology Daily won the Third National Top 100 Publications in China.
