= Water fuel cell =

Perpetual motion machine

The water fuel cell is a non-functional design for a "perpetual motion machine" created by Stanley Allen Meyer (August 24, 1940 – March 20, 1998). Meyer claimed that a car retrofitted with the device could use water as fuel instead of gasoline. Meyer's claims about his "Water Fuel Cell" and the car that it powered were found to be fraudulent by an Ohio court in 1996.

== Purported design ==
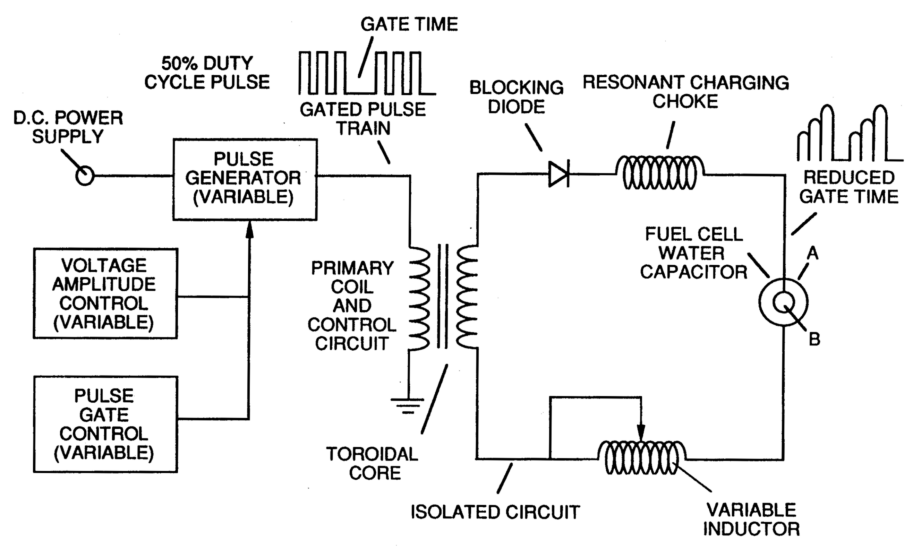
The circuit

The water fuel cell purportedly split water into its component elements, hydrogen and oxygen. The hydrogen gas was then burned to convert chemical energy to heat energy, a process that reconstituted the water molecules. According to Meyer, the device required less energy to perform electrolysis than the minimum energy requirement predicted or measured by conventional science. The mechanism of action was alleged to involve "Brown's gas", a mixture of oxyhydrogen with a ratio of 2:1, the same composition as liquid water; which would then be mixed with ambient air (nitrogen, oxygen, argon, etc). The resultant hydrogen gas was then burned, resulting in the reconstitution of the water molecules in another unit separate from the unit in which water was separated. If the device worked as specified, it would violate both the first and second laws of thermodynamics, allowing operation as a perpetual motion machine.

Throughout his patents Meyer used the terms "fuel cell" or "water fuel cell" to refer to the portion of his device in which electricity is passed through water to produce hydrogen and oxygen. Meyer's use of the term in this sense is contrary to its usual meaning in science and engineering, in which such cells are conventionally called "electrolytic cells". Furthermore, the term "fuel cell" is usually reserved for cells that produce electricity from a chemical redox reaction, whereas Meyer's fuel cell consumed electricity, as shown in his patents and in the circuit pictured on the right. Meyer describes in a 1990 patent the use of a "water fuel cell assembly" and portrays some images of his "fuel cell water capacitor". According to the patent, in this case "... the term 'fuel cell' refers to a single unit of the invention comprising a water capacitor cell ... that produces the fuel gas in accordance with the method of the invention."

== Media coverage ==
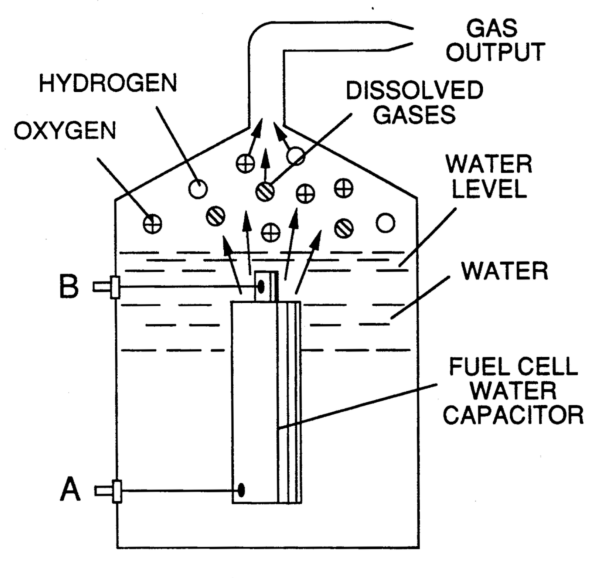
The water fuel cell

In a news report on an Ohio TV station, Meyer showed a dune buggy he claimed was powered by his water fuel cell. He stated that only 22 US gallons (83 liters) of water were required to travel from Los Angeles to New York. Furthermore, Meyer claimed to have replaced the spark plugs with "injectors" that introduced a hydrogen/oxygen mixture into the engine cylinders. The water was subjected to an electrical resonance that dissociated it into its basic atomic make-up. The water fuel cell would split the water into hydrogen and oxygen gas, which would then be combusted back into water vapor in a conventional internal combustion engine to produce net energy.

Philip Ball, writing in academic journal Nature, characterized Meyer's claims as pseudoscience, noting that "It's not easy to establish how Meyer's car was meant to work, except that it involved a fuel cell that was able to split water using less energy than was released by recombination of the elements ... Crusaders against pseudoscience can rant and rave as much as they like, but in the end they might as well accept that the myth of water as a fuel is never going to go away."

== Lawsuit ==
Stanley Meyer's invention was later termed fraudulent after two investors to whom he had sold dealerships offering the right to do business in Water Fuel Cell technology sued him in 1996. His car was due to be examined by the expert witness Michael Laughton, Professor of Electrical Engineering at Queen Mary University of London and Fellow of the Royal Academy of Engineering. However, Meyer made what Professor Laughton considered a "lame excuse" on the days of examination and did not allow the test to proceed. His "water fuel cell" was later examined by three expert witnesses in court who found that there "was nothing revolutionary about the cell at all and that it was simply using conventional electrolysis." The court found Meyer had committed "gross and egregious fraud" and ordered him to repay the two investors their $25,000.

== Meyer's death ==
Stanley Meyer died suddenly on March 20, 1998, while dining at a restaurant. His brother claimed that during a meeting with two Belgian investors, Meyer suddenly ran outside, saying "They poisoned me". After an investigation, the Grove City police agreed with the Franklin County coroner report that ruled that Meyer, who had high blood pressure, died of a cerebral aneurysm. Some of Meyer's supporters believe that he was assassinated to suppress his inventions. Philippe Vandemoortele, one of the Belgian investors, stated that he had been supporting Meyer financially for several years and considered him a personal friend, and that he has no idea where the rumors of his involvement in the death came from.

== Aftermath ==
Meyer's patents have expired, and his inventions are now in the public domain. However, no commercial engine or vehicle manufacturer has incorporated his work.

== See also ==
- Free energy suppression conspiracy theory – New energy suppression
- History of perpetual motion machines
