= Free energy suppression conspiracy theory =

Conspiracy theory

Free energy suppression (or new energy suppression) is a conspiracy theory that technologically viable, pollution-free, no-cost energy sources are being suppressed by governments, corporations, or advocacy groups. Devices allegedly suppressed include perpetual motion machines, cold fusion generators, torus-based generators, reverse-engineered extraterrestrial technology, anti-gravity propulsion systems, and other generally unproven or physically impossible, low-cost energy sources.

== Claims ==
The alleged suppression (or weakening) of the technology is claimed to have occurred since the mid-19th century and allegedly perpetrated by various government agencies, corporate powers, special interest groups, and fraudulent inventors. The special interest groups are usually claimed to be associated with the fossil fuel or nuclear industry, whose business model would be threatened.

Claims of suppression include:

- The claim that the scientific community has controlled and suppressed research into alternative avenues of energy generation via the institutions of peer review and academic pressure.
- The claim that devices exist which are capable of extracting significant and usable power from pre-existing unconventional energy reservoirs, such as the quantum vacuum zero point energy, for little or no cost, but are being suppressed.
- The claim that related patents have been bought up, such as those for 100 mpg carburetors.

Some people who have been claimed to be suppressed, harassed, or killed for their research are Stanley Meyer, Eugene Mallove, and Nikola Tesla. Free energy proponents claim that Tesla developed a system (the Wardenclyffe Tower) that could generate unlimited energy for free. His system was only intended to transmit energy for free; the system's energy would still need to be generated through conventional means.

Proponents of the conspiracy theory include Gary McKinnon, a Scottish computer hacker who unlawfully accessed computer systems to look for evidence of a secret free energy device.

Videos apparently showing homemade perpetual motion machines generating free energy with magnets omit that said machines possess hidden batteries to create the illusion of perpetual motion, since their existence would violate the first law of thermodynamics.

Followers of the Tartaria conspiracy theory believe an advanced civilization called Tartaria destroyed by a "mud flood" now covered up by the world's governments once had free wireless energy.

== See also ==
- Disclosure (ufology)
- Gravitational energy
- Invention Secrecy Act
- List of pseudoscience topics
- Potential cultural impact of extraterrestrial contact
