= Reiki =

Pseudoscientific healing technique

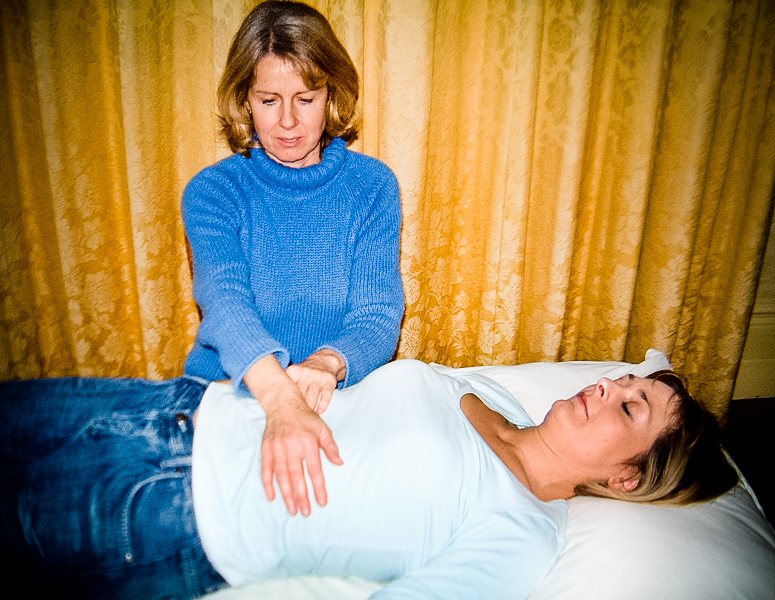
A reiki session in progress

Reiki (Note: /ˈreɪki/ RAY-kee; Japanese: 霊気) is a pseudoscientific form of energy healing, a type of alternative medicine created by Mikao Usui in Japan in the 1920s. Reiki practitioners use a technique called palm healing or hands-on healing through which, according to practitioners, a "universal energy" is transferred through the palms of the practitioner to the client, to encourage emotional or physical healing. It is based on qi (chi), which practitioners say is a universal life force; there is no empirical evidence that such a life force exists.

Reiki is used as an illustrative example of pseudoscience in scholarly texts and academic journal articles. Its marketing has been described as "fraudulent misrepresentation", and reiki itself as a "nonsensical method", with a recommendation that the United States government agency NCCIH stop funding reiki research because it "has no substantiated health value and lacks a scientifically plausible rationale".

Clinical research does not show reiki to be effective as a treatment for any medical condition, including cancer, diabetic neuropathy, anxiety, or depression. There is no proof of the effectiveness of reiki therapy compared to placebo. Studies reporting positive effects have had methodological flaws.

It has no plausible mechanism or proven medical benefit, and major medical organizations do not recommend it as a treatment, especially in place of evidence-based care. While reiki is generally low-risk, concerns exist that patients might forgo effective treatments. Reiki has no standardized regulation or certification.

== Etymology ==
According to the Oxford English Dictionary, the English alternative medicine word reiki comes from Japanese reiki (霊気) "mysterious atmosphere, miraculous sign", combining rei "universal" and ki "vital energy"—the Sino-Japanese reading of Chinese língqì (靈氣) "numinous atmosphere".

== Conceptual basis ==
Reiki's teachings and adherents claim that qi is a physiological force that can be manipulated to treat a disease or condition. There is no evidence for the existence of qi. Reiki is classified as a pseudoscientific practice based on confusion between metaphysical and empirical concepts.

Most research on reiki is poorly designed and prone to bias. There is no reliable empirical evidence that reiki is helpful for treating any medical condition, although some physicians have said it might help promote feelings of general well-being. In 2011, William T. Jarvis of The National Council Against Health Fraud stated there "is no evidence that clinical reiki's effects are due to anything other than suggestion" or the placebo effect.

The 22 April 2014 Skeptoid podcast episode entitled "Your Body's Alleged Energy Fields" relates a reiki practitioner's report of what was happening as she passed her hands over a subject's body:

What we'll be looking for here, within John's auric field, is any areas of intense heat, unusual coldness, a repelling energy, a dense energy, a magnetizing energy, tingling sensations, or actually the body attracting the hands into that area where it needs the reiki energy, and balancing of John's qi.

== Technique ==
A session usually lasts for approximately one hour. "Level 1" practitioners place a hand or hands on or near various parts of the body for several minutes. During this time, a vital energy is meant to flow from the practitioner into the client's body. "Level 2" practitioners alternatively may offer their services at a distance with no skin contact.

== Research and critical evaluation ==
Reiki is used as an illustrative example of pseudoscience in scholarly texts and academic journal articles. David Gorski writes that reiki vies with homeopathy to be the "one quackery that rules them all" because of its "sheer ridiculousness and disconnect from reality". Jann Bellamy, a lawyer and critic of alternative medicine, has described the marketing of reiki as "fraudulent misrepresentation".

In criticizing the State University of New York for offering a continuing education course on reiki, one source stated, "reiki postulates the existence of a universal energy unknown to science and thus far undetectable surrounding the human body, which practitioners can learn to manipulate using their hands," and others said, "In spite of its [reiki's] diffusion, the baseline mechanism of action has not been demonstrated ..." and, "Neither the forces involved nor the alleged therapeutic benefits have been demonstrated by scientific testing."

Several authors have pointed to the vitalistic energy that reiki is claimed to treat, with one saying, "Ironically, the only thing that distinguishes reiki from therapeutic touch is that it [reiki] involves actual touch," and others stating that the International Center for Reiki Training "mimic[s] the institutional aspects of science" seeking legitimacy but holds no more promise than an alchemy society.

A guideline published by the American Academy of Neurology, the American Association of Neuromuscular & Electrodiagnostic Medicine, and the American Academy of Physical Medicine and Rehabilitation states, "Reiki therapy should probably not be considered for the treatment of PDN [painful diabetic neuropathy]." Canadian sociologist Susan J. Palmer has listed reiki as among the pseudoscientific healing methods used by cults in France to attract members.

Stephen Barrett of Quackwatch describes reiki as a "nonsensical method". As a reason for why NCCAM should stop funding reiki research, he writes: "Reiki has no substantiated health value and lacks a scientifically plausible rationale. Science-based healthcare settings should not tolerate its use, and scarce government research dollars should not be used to study it further."

=== Evidence quality ===
A 2008 systematic review of nine randomized clinical trials found several shortcomings in the literature on reiki. Depending on the tools used to measure depression and anxiety, the results varied and were not reliable or valid. Furthermore, the scientific community has been unable to replicate the findings of studies that support reiki. The review also found issues with the reporting methodology in some of the literature, in that parts were often omitted completely or not clearly described. Frequently in these studies, sample sizes were not calculated, and adequate allocation and double-blind procedures were not followed. The review also reported that such studies exaggerated the effectiveness of treatment and failed to control for differences in the experience of reiki practitioners or for the possibility that the same practitioner might produce different outcomes at different times. None of the studies in the review provided a rationale for the treatment duration, and no study reported adverse effects.

=== Safety ===
Safety concerns for reiki sessions are very low and are akin to those of many complementary and alternative medicine practices. Some physicians and health care providers, however, believe that patients may unadvisedly substitute proven treatments for life-threatening conditions with unproven alternative modalities, including reiki, thus endangering their health.

=== Catholic Church concerns ===
In March 2009, the Committee on Doctrine of the United States Conference of Catholic Bishops (USCCB) issued the document Guidelines for Evaluating Reiki as an Alternative Therapy, in which they declared that the practice of reiki was based on superstition, being neither truly faith healing nor science-based medicine: "Reiki lacks scientific credibility. It has not been accepted by the scientific and medical communities as an effective therapy." It stated that reiki was incompatible with Christian spirituality since it involved belief in a human power over healing rather than prayer to God, and that, viewed as a natural means of healing, it lacked scientific credibility. The 2009 guideline concluded that "since reiki therapy is not compatible with either Christian teaching or scientific evidence, it would be inappropriate for Catholic institutions, such as Catholic health care facilities and retreat centers, or persons representing the Church, such as Catholic chaplains, to promote or to provide support for reiki therapy." Since this announcement, some Catholic laypeople have continued to practice reiki, but it has been removed from many Catholic hospitals and other institutions.

In a December 2014 article from the USCCB's Committee on Divine Worship on exorcism and its use in the Church, reiki is listed as a practice "that may have [negatively] impacted the current state of the afflicted person".

== Training, certification and adoption ==
A reiki practitioner who offers teaching is known as a "reiki master".

There is no central authority controlling use of the words reiki or reiki master. Certificates can be purchased online for under $100. It is "not uncommon" for a course to offer attainment of reiki master in two weekends. There is no regulation of practitioners or reiki master in the United States.

The Washington Post reported in 2014 that in response to customer demand, at least 60 hospitals in the United States offered reiki, at a cost of between $40 and $300 per session. Cancer Research UK reported in 2019 that some cancer centers and hospices in the UK offer free or low-cost reiki for people with cancer. The cost per session for treatment vary widely, but a CNBC report found a practitioner charging $229 per session of 60–90 minutes.

== History ==
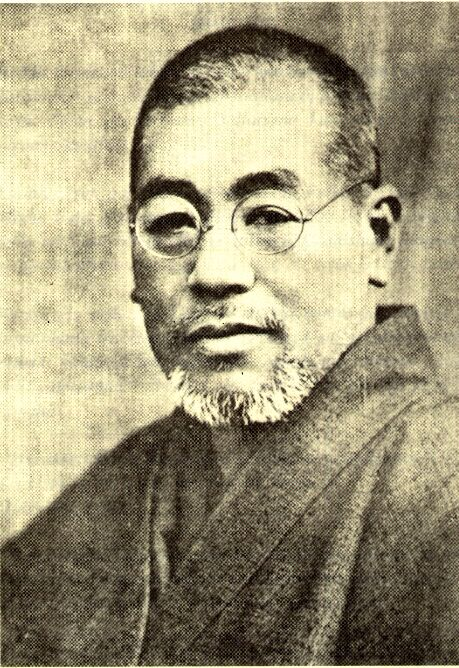
Mikao Usui (1865–1926)

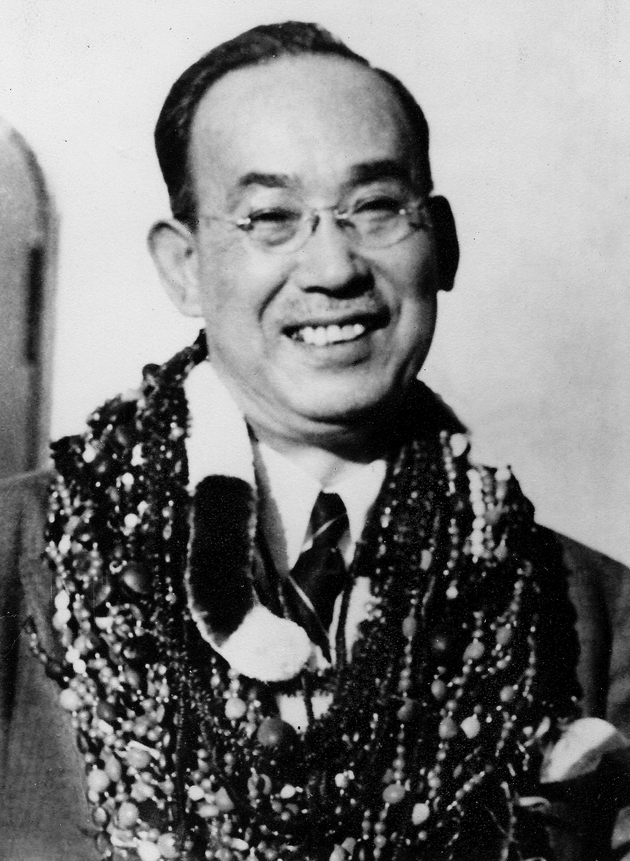
Chujiro Hayashi (1880–1940)

Mikao Usui originated the practice in Japan. According to the inscription on his memorial stone, Usui taught his system of reiki to more than 2,000 people during his lifetime. While teaching reiki in Fukuyama, Hiroshima, Usui suffered a stroke and died on 9 March 1926.

The first reiki clinic in the United States was started in 1970 by Hawayo Takata, a student of Chujiro Hayashi (who was a disciple of Usui).

== See also ==
- Glossary of alternative medicine
- List of ineffective cancer treatments
- Scientific skepticism
- The Force
