= Naturopathy =

Form of alternative medicine

Alternative medicine
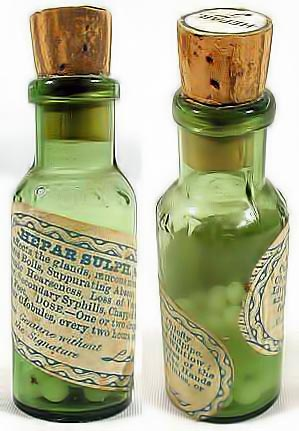
- A homeopathic preparation of Hepar sulph – homeopathy can be offered as part of naturopathic treatment.
- Claims: Diseases are cured through the body's "natural healing" ability which is primarily aided by practices labelled as "natural" (and not primarily by pharmaceutical drugs, surgery, and other treatments within evidence-based medicine, not seen as "natural"), comprising widely ranging "nature cures" and any form of alternative medicine that may be labelled as "natural"
- Related fields: Alternative medicine
- Original proponents: Benedict Lust; Sebastian Kneipp
- MeSH: D009324
- See also: Humorism, heroic medicine, vitalism

Naturopathy, or naturopathic medicine, is a form of alternative medicine. A wide array of practices branded as "natural", "non-invasive", or promoting "self-healing" are employed by its practitioners, who are known as naturopaths. These treatments range from the pseudoscientific and thoroughly discredited, such as homeopathy, to the widely accepted, such as certain forms of psychotherapy. The ideology and methods of naturopathy are based on vitalism and folk medicine rather than evidence-based medicine, although practitioners may use techniques supported by evidence. The ethics of naturopathy have been called into question by medical professionals and its practice has been characterized as quackery.

Naturopathic practitioners commonly encourage alternative treatments that are rejected by conventional medicine, including resistance to surgery or vaccines for some patients. The diagnoses made by naturopaths often have no basis in science and are often not accepted by mainstream medicine.

Naturopaths frequently campaign for legal recognition in the United States. Naturopathy is prohibited in three U.S. states (Florida, South Carolina, and Tennessee) and tightly regulated in many others. Some states, however, allow naturopaths to perform minor surgery or even prescribe drugs. While some schools exist for naturopaths, and some jurisdictions allow such practitioners to call themselves doctors, the lack of accreditation, scientific medical training, and quantifiable positive results means they lack the competency of true medical doctors.

== History ==
The term "naturopathy" originates from natura (Latin root for 'birth') and pathos (the Greek root for 'suffering') to suggest "natural healing". Naturopaths claim the ancient Greek "Father of Medicine", Hippocrates, as the first advocate of naturopathic medicine, before the term existed. Naturopathy has its roots in the 19th-century Natural Cure movement of Europe. After graduating as a licenciate of the Royal College of Physicians of Edinburgh in 1879, Thomas Allinson began promoting his hygienic medicine in London, advocating a natural diet, exercise, and avoidance of tobacco and overwork.

The term naturopathy was coined in 1895 by John Scheel, and bought by Benedict Lust, whom naturopaths consider to be the "Father of U.S. Naturopathy". Lust had been schooled in hydrotherapy and other natural health practices in Germany by Father Sebastian Kneipp; Kneipp sent Lust to the United States to spread his drugless methods. Lust defined naturopathy as a broad discipline rather than a particular method, and included such techniques as hydrotherapy, herbal medicine, and homeopathy, as well as eliminating overeating, tea, coffee, and alcohol. He described the body in spiritual and vitalistic terms with "absolute reliance upon the cosmic forces of man's nature". According to the Merriam-Webster Dictionary, the first known use of "naturopathy" in print is from 1901.

From 1901, Lust founded the American School of Naturopathy in New York. In 1902, the original North American Kneipp Societies were discontinued and renamed "Naturopathic Societies". In September 1919, the Naturopathic Society of America was dissolved, and Benedict Lust founded the American Naturopathic Association to supplant it. Naturopaths became licensed under naturopathic or drugless practitioner laws in 25 states in the first three decades of the twentieth century. Naturopathy was adopted by many chiropractors, and several schools offered both Doctor of Naturopathy (ND) and Doctor of Chiropractic (DC) degrees. Estimates of the number of naturopathic schools active in the United States during this period vary from about one to two dozen.

After a period of rapid growth, naturopathy went into decline for several decades after the 1930s. In 1910, the Carnegie Foundation for the Advancement of Teaching published the Flexner Report, which criticized many aspects of medical education, especially quality and lack of scientific rigour. The advent of penicillin and other "miracle drugs" and the consequent popularity of modern medicine also contributed to naturopathy's decline. In the 1940s and 1950s, a broadening of scope-of-practice laws led many chiropractic schools to drop their ND degrees, though many chiropractors continued to practice naturopathy. From 1940 to 1963, the American Medical Association campaigned against heterodox medical systems. By 1958, practice of naturopathy was licensed in only five states. In 1968, the United States Department of Health, Education, and Welfare issued a report on naturopathy concluding that naturopathy was not grounded in medical science and that naturopathic education was inadequate to prepare graduates to make appropriate diagnosis and provide treatment; the report recommends against expanding Medicare coverage to include naturopathic treatments. In 1977, an Australian committee of inquiry reached similar conclusions; it did not recommend licensure for naturopaths.

Beginning in the 1970s, there was a revival of interest in the United States and Canada, in conjunction with the "holistic health" movement. As of 2009, fifteen U.S. states, Puerto Rico, the US Virgin Islands and the District of Columbia licensed naturopathic doctors, and the State of Washington requires insurance companies to offer reimbursement for services provided by naturopathic physicians. On the other hand, some states, such as South Carolina and Tennessee, prohibit the practice of naturopathy.

In the United States, the Indian Health Service began accepting naturopathic doctors in their clinics and practice in 2013, also making loan repayment available to NDs.

In 2015, a former naturopathic doctor, Britt Marie Hermes, began writing critically about her experience in naturopathic medical training and practice. Her blog garnered a large following among skeptics while enraging some proponents of alternative medicine.

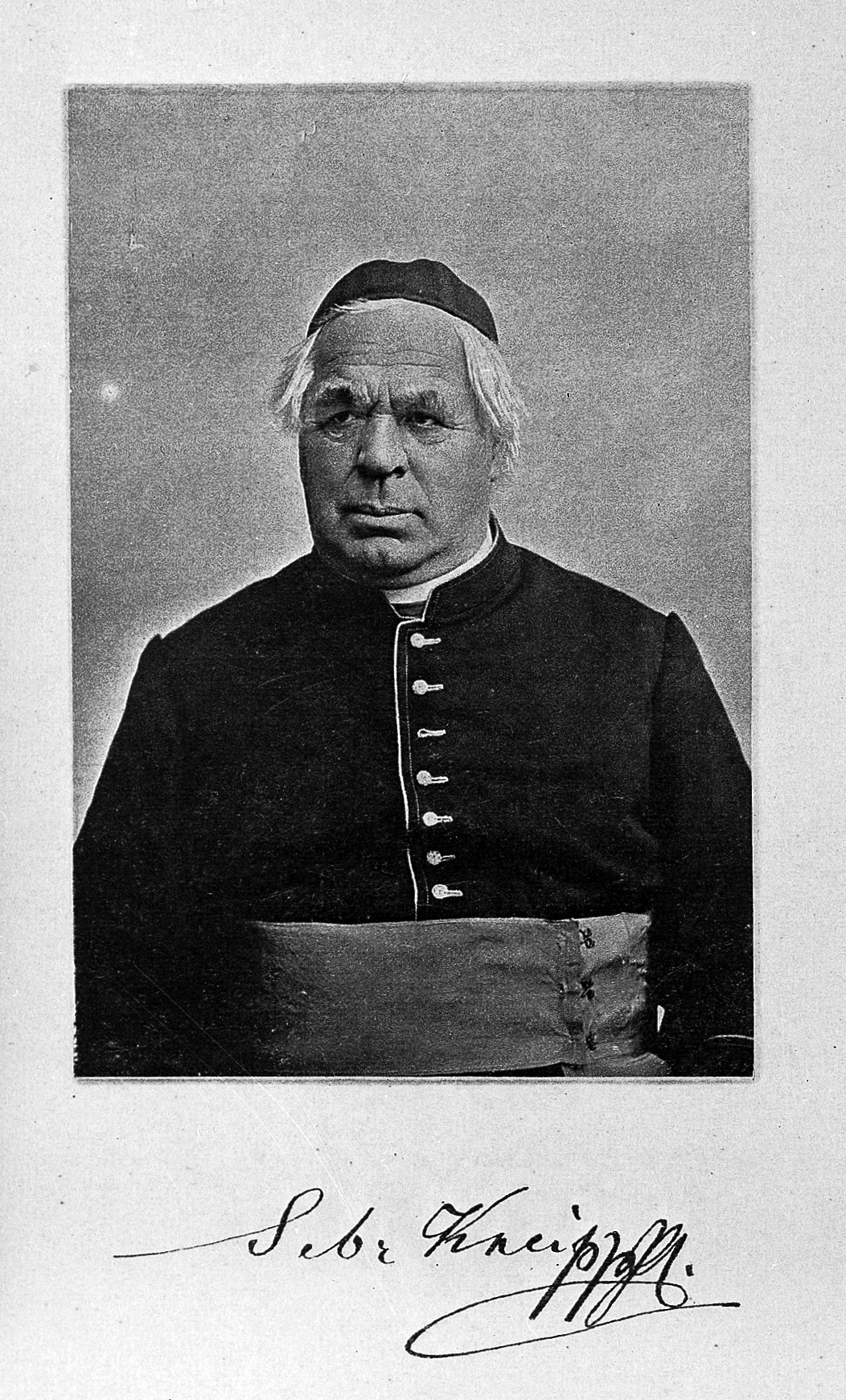
Sebastian Kneipp c. 1898, a Bavarian priest and forefather of naturopathy

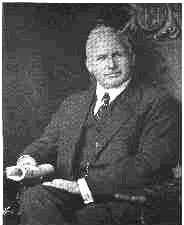
Benedict Lust c. 1902, the founder of naturopathy in the U.S.

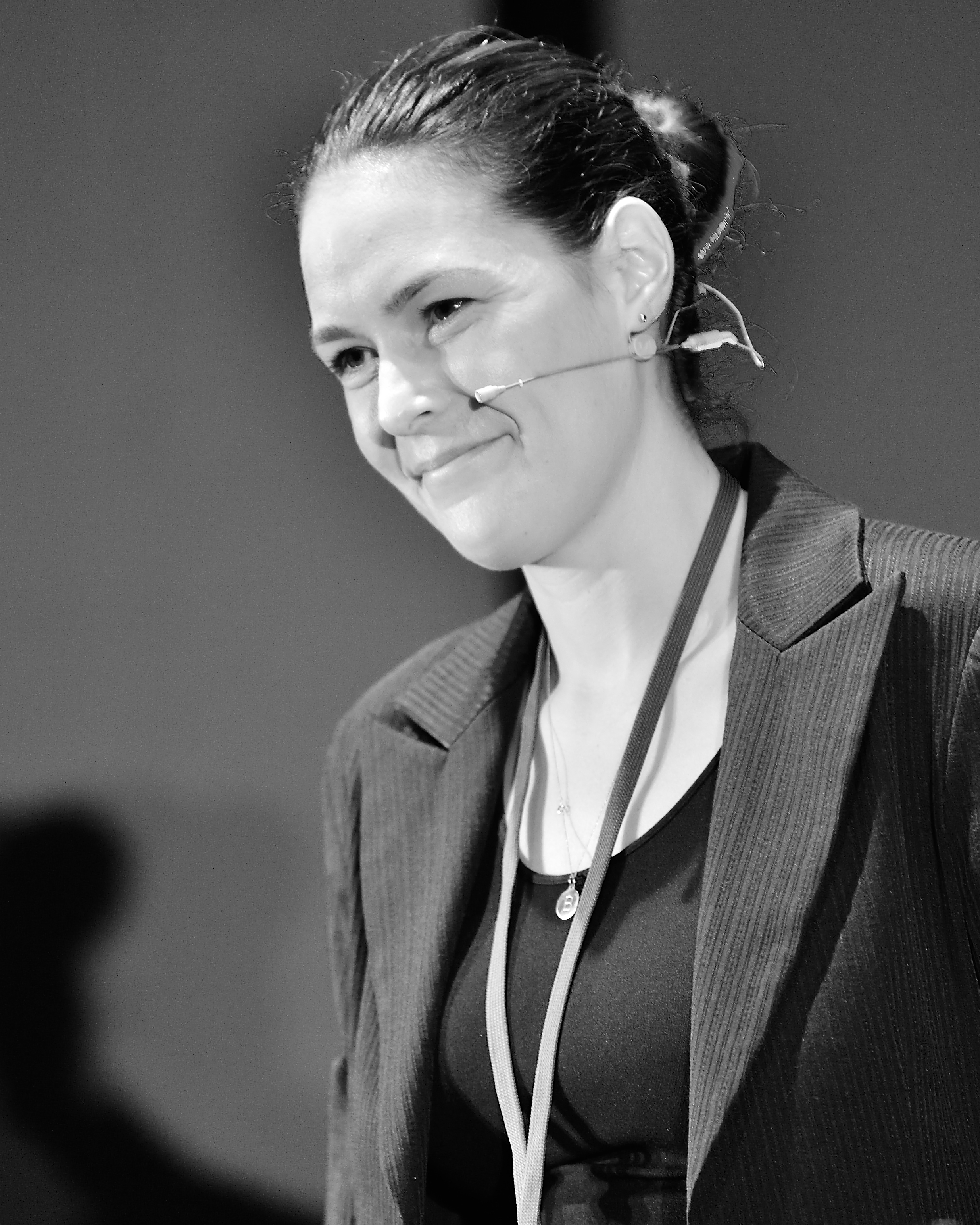
Britt Marie Hermes c. 2016, a former naturopathic doctor and major critic of naturopathic medicine

== Practice ==
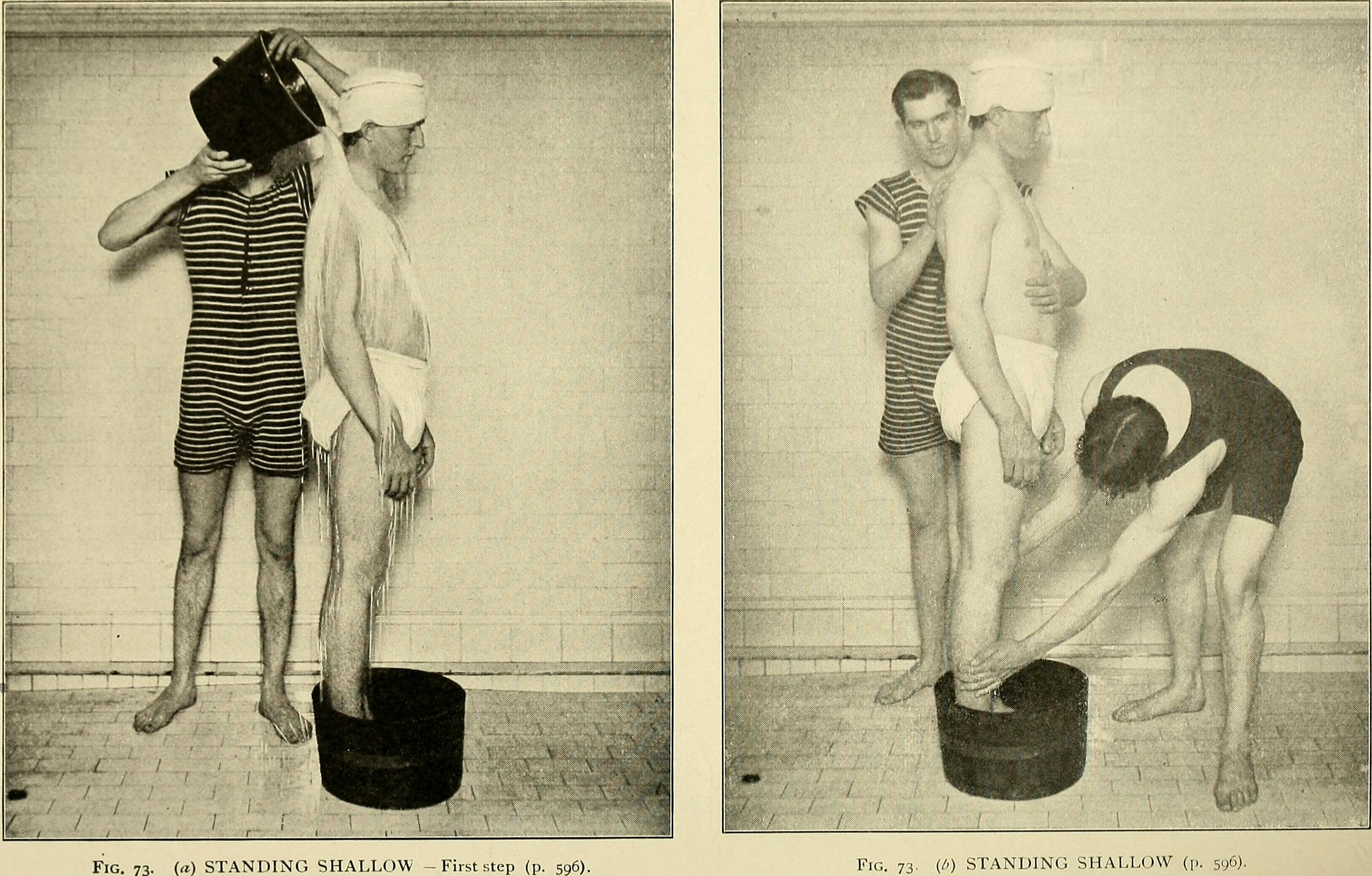
A patient undergoing a hydrotherapy session

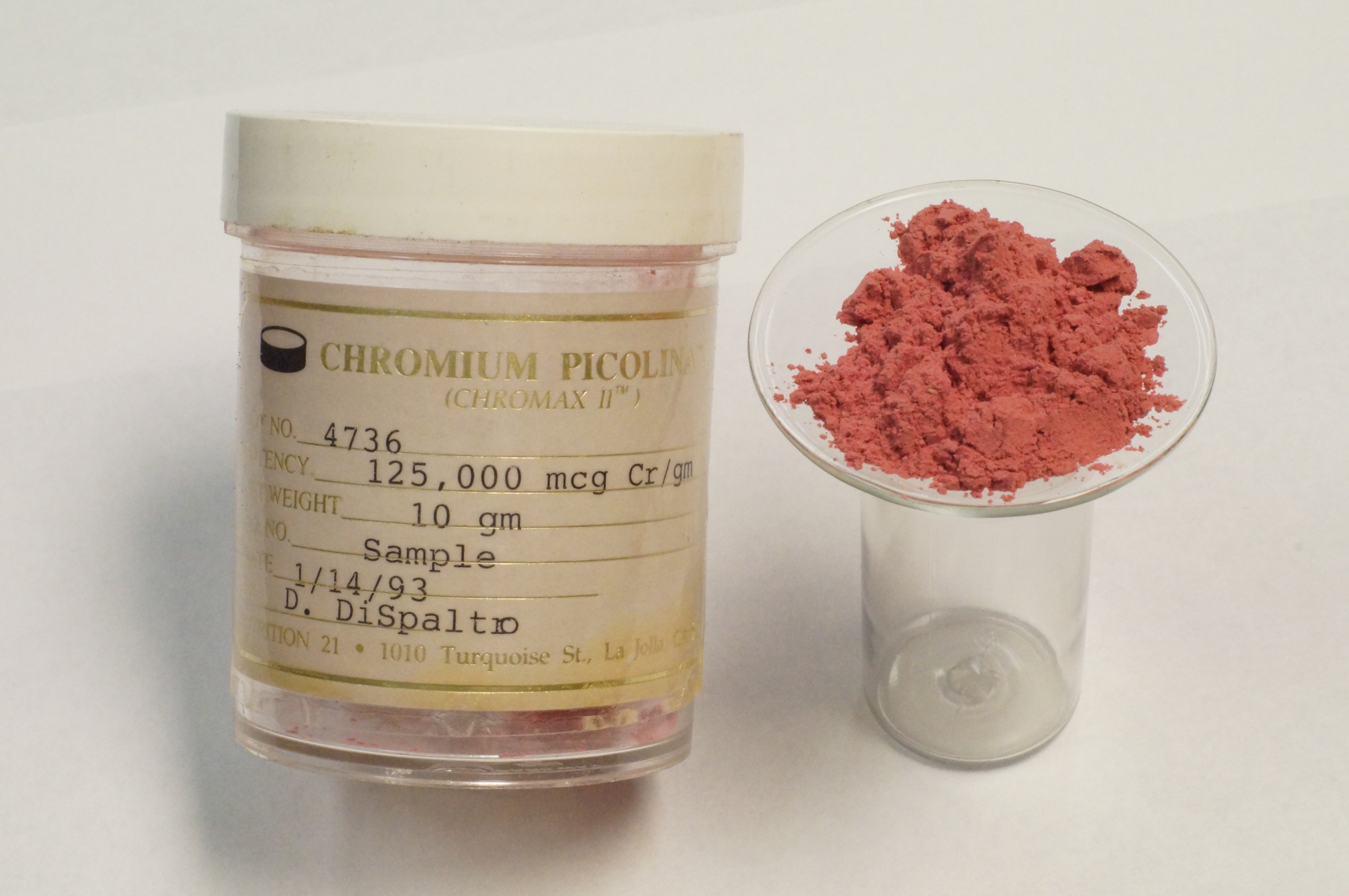
A nutritional supplement of Chromium(III) picolinate, Chromax II

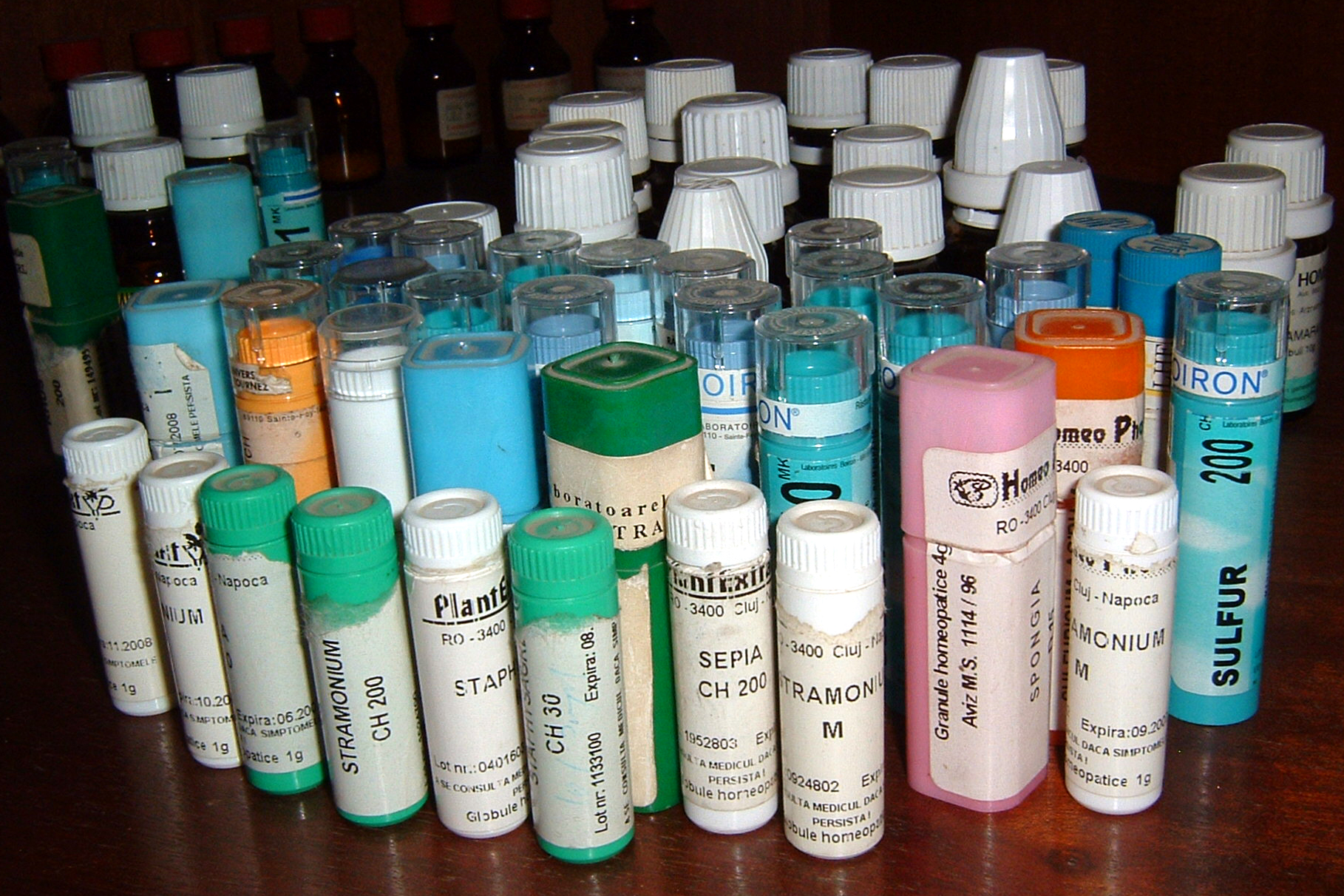
Homeopathic preparations are commonly used by naturopaths. The practice is considered a pseudoscience.

In 2003, a report was presented by Kimball C. Atwood, an American medical doctor and researcher from Newton, Massachusetts, best known as a critic of naturopathic medicine, stating among other criticisms that "The practice of naturopathy is based on a belief in the body's ability to heal itself through a special vital energy or force guiding bodily processes internally".

Diagnosis and treatment concern primarily alternative therapies and "natural" methods that naturopaths claim promote the body's natural ability to heal. Many naturopaths in India now use modern diagnostic techniques in their practice. Naturopaths focus on a holistic approach, avoiding the use of surgery and conventional medicines. Naturopaths aim to prevent illness through stress reduction and changes to diet and lifestyle, often rejecting the methods of evidence-based medicine.

A consultation typically begins with a comprehensive patient interview assessing lifestyle, medical history, emotional tone, and physical features, as well as physical examination. Many naturopaths present themselves as primary care providers, and some naturopathic physicians may prescribe drugs, perform minor surgery, and integrate other conventional medical approaches such as diet and lifestyle counselling with their naturopathic practice. Traditional naturopaths deal exclusively with lifestyle changes, not diagnosing or treating disease. Naturopaths do not generally recommend vaccines and antibiotics, based in part on the early views that shaped the profession, and they may provide alternative remedies even in cases where evidence-based medicine has been shown effective.

=== Methods ===
Naturopaths are often opposed to mainstream medicine and take an antivaccinationist stance.

The particular modalities used by a naturopath vary with training and scope of practice. These may include herbalism, homeopathy, acupuncture, nature cures, physical medicine, applied kinesiology, colonic enemas, chelation therapy, color therapy, cranial osteopathy, hair analysis, iridology, live blood analysis, ozone therapy, psychotherapy, public health measures and hygiene, reflexology, rolfing, massage therapy, and traditional Chinese medicine. Nature cures include a range of therapies based on exposure to natural elements such as sunshine, fresh air, or heat or cold, as well as nutrition advice such as following a vegetarian and whole food diet, fasting, or abstention from alcohol and sugar. Physical medicine includes naturopathic, osseous, or soft tissue manipulative therapy, sports medicine, exercise, and hydrotherapy. Psychological counseling includes meditation, relaxation, and other methods of stress management.

A 2004 survey determined the most commonly prescribed naturopathic therapeutics in Washington state and Connecticut were botanical medicines, vitamins, minerals, homeopathy, and allergy treatments. An examination published in 2011 of naturopathic clinic websites in Alberta and British Columbia found that the most commonly advertised therapies were homeopathy, botanical medicine, nutrition, acupuncture, lifestyle counseling, and detoxification.

In 2020, a survey of methods used by naturopaths in fourteen countries reported that 27% of clients received acupuncture, 22% homeopathy, 16% "other energetic medicines", and 13.5% were given hydrotherapy. A mean of 4.0 "treatments" were provided to each customer. One-third (33%) of patients consulted with only the naturopath to manage their primary health concern.

=== Evidence basis ===
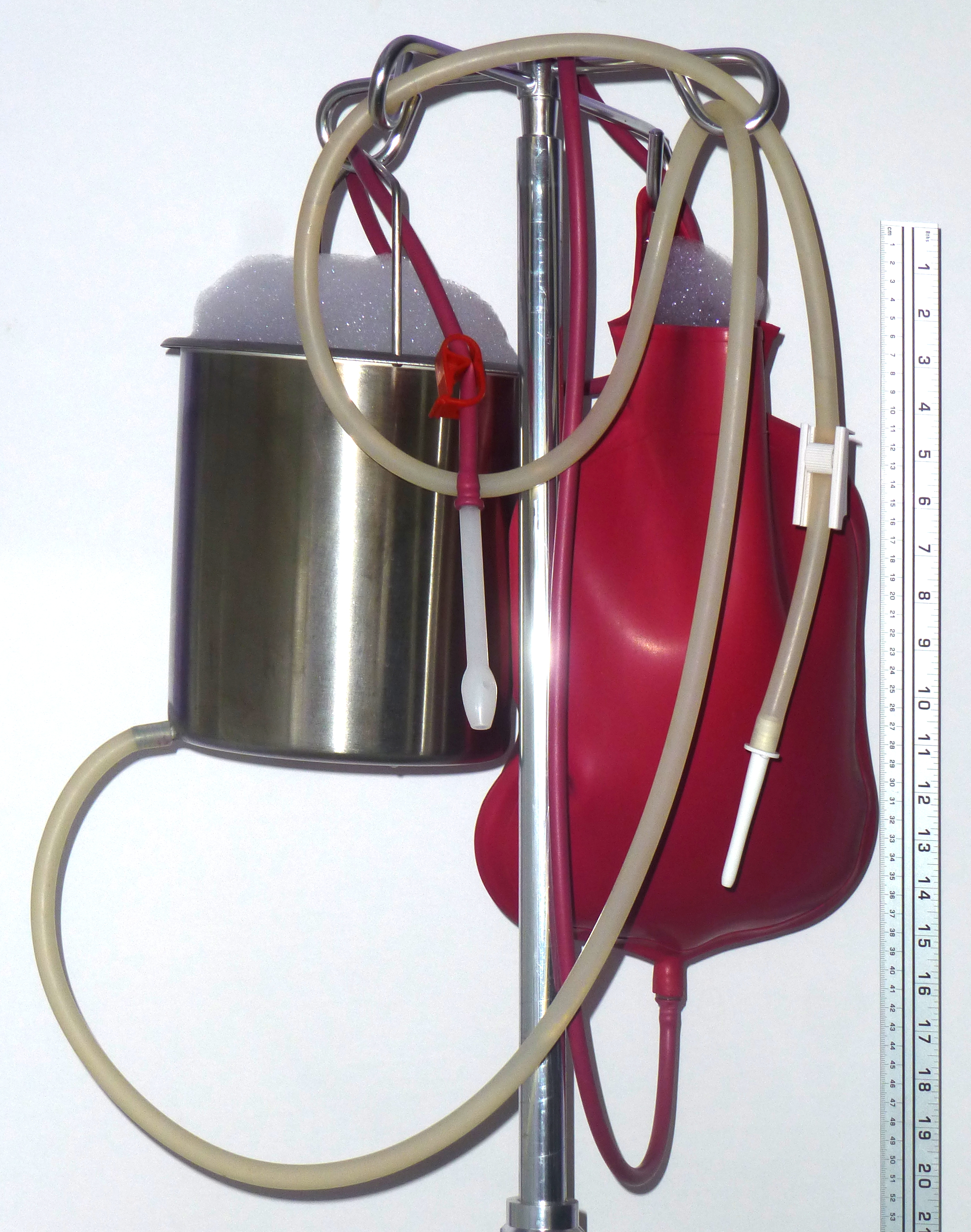
Equipment for administering large enemas: a bag and a bucket, each holding a gallon. Enemas and colonic irrigation are commonly used by naturopaths for a wide range of medical conditions, for which there are no known health benefits.

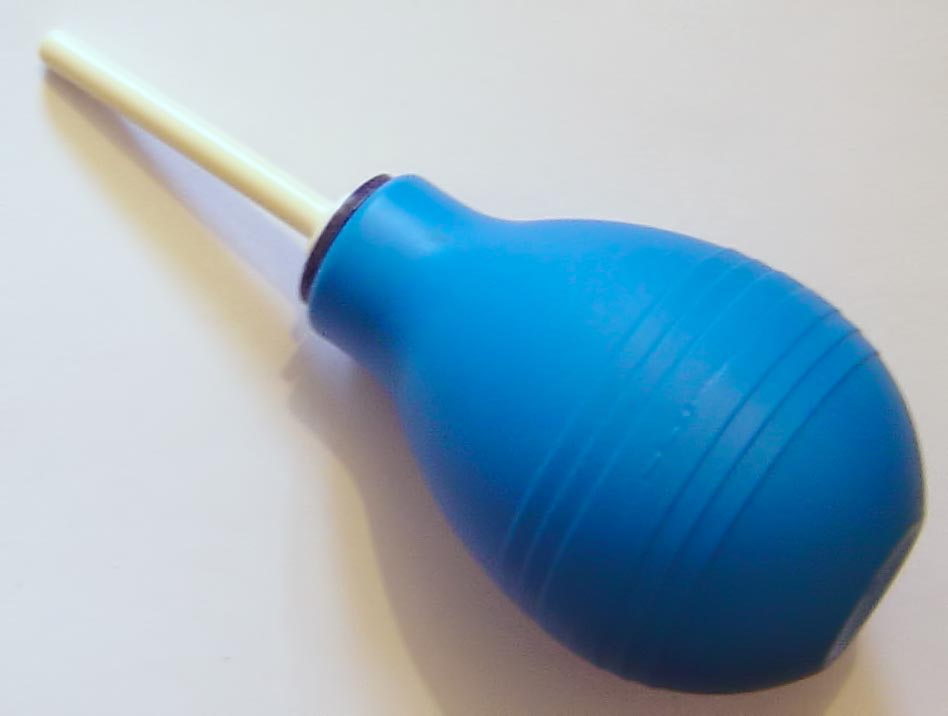
A rectal bulb syringe for injecting a small enema

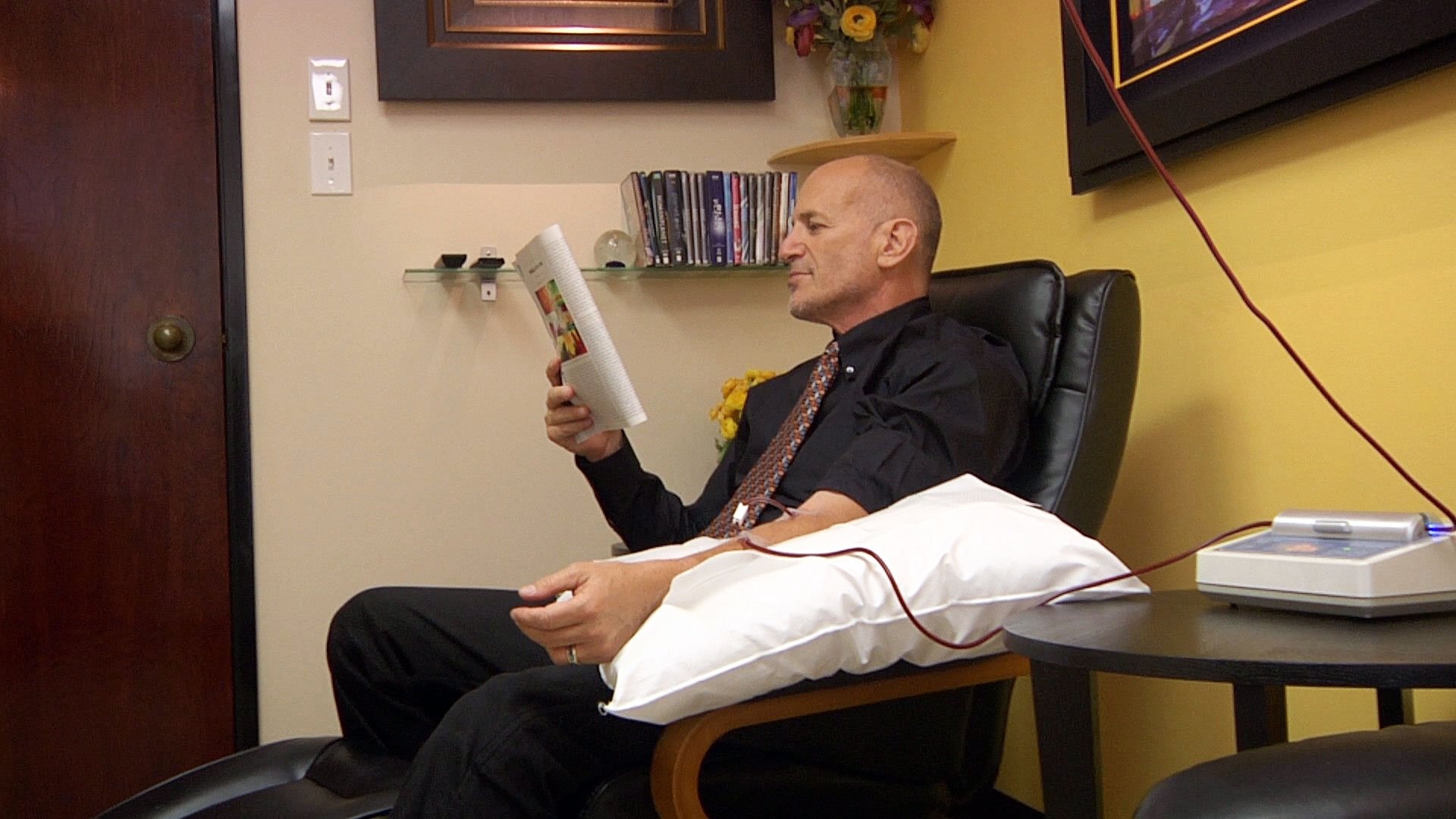
Person undergoing ozone IV therapy with ultraviolet irradiation. According to the FDA, "Ozone is a toxic gas with no known useful medical application in specific, adjunctive, or preventive therapy."

Naturopathy as a whole lacks an adequate scientific basis, and it is rejected by the medical community. Although it includes valid lifestyle advice from mainstream medicine (healthy sleep, balanced diet, regular exercise), it typically adds a range of pseudoscientific beliefs. Some methods rely on immaterial "vital energy fields", the existence of which has not been proven, and there is concern that naturopathy as a field tends towards isolation from general scientific discourse. Naturopathy is criticized for its reliance on and its association with unproven, disproven, and other controversial alternative medical treatments, and for its vitalistic underpinnings. Natural substances known as nutraceuticals show little promise in treating diseases, especially cancer, as laboratory experiments have shown limited therapeutic effect on biochemical pathways, while clinical trials demonstrate poor bioavailability. According to the American Cancer Society, "scientific evidence does not support claims that naturopathic medicine can cure cancer or any other disease". According to Britt Hermes, naturopath student programs are problematic because "As a naturopath [student], you are making justifications to make the rules and to fudge the standards of how to interpret research all along the way. Because if you don't, you're not left with anything, basically".

In 2015, the Australian Government's Department of Health published the results of a review of alternative therapies that sought to determine if any were suitable for being covered by health insurance; Naturopathy was one of 17 therapies evaluated for which no clear evidence of effectiveness was found.

Kimball C. Atwood IV writes, in the journal Medscape General Medicine,

Naturopathic physicians now claim to be primary care physicians proficient in the practice of both "conventional" and "natural" medicine. Their training, however, amounts to a small fraction of that of medical doctors who practice primary care. An examination of their literature, moreover, reveals that it is replete with pseudoscientific, ineffective, unethical, and potentially dangerous practices.

In another article, Atwood writes that "Physicians who consider naturopaths to be their colleagues thus find themselves in opposition to one of the fundamental ethical precepts of modern medicine. If naturopaths are not to be judged "nonscientific practitioners", the term has no useful meaning".

A former licensed naturopathic doctor, Britt Marie Hermes, states that "any product that is sold by a naturopath almost guarantees that there is no reliable scientific data to support whatever health claims are made, and that while some naturopaths claim to only practice evidence based medicine, "the problem is, all naturopaths in an accredited naturopathic program are required to extensively study homeopathy, herbal medicine, energy healing, chiropractic techniques, water therapy" and other pseudoscientific practices. Hermes further notes that, while some naturopaths claim that their method can be effective treatments for psychological disorders, "no naturopathic treatment has been clinically proven to be safe and effective for bipolar disorder or any other condition."

According to Arnold S. Relman, the Textbook of Natural Medicine is inadequate as a teaching tool, as it omits to mention or treat in detail many common ailments, improperly emphasizes treatments "not likely to be effective" over those that are, and promotes unproven herbal remedies at the expense of pharmaceuticals. He concludes that "the risks to many sick patients seeking care from the average naturopathic practitioner would far outweigh any possible benefits".

The Massachusetts Medical Society states, "Naturopathic practices are unchanged by research and remain a large assortment of erroneous and potentially dangerous claims mixed with a sprinkling of non-controversial dietary and lifestyle advice."

=== Safety of natural treatments ===
Naturopaths often recommend exposure to naturally occurring substances, such as sunshine, herbs and certain foods, as well as activities they describe as natural, such as exercise, meditation and relaxation. Naturopaths claim that these natural treatments help restore the body's innate ability to heal itself without the adverse effects of conventional medicine. However, "natural" methods and chemicals are not necessarily safer or more effective than "artificial" or "synthetic" ones, and any treatment capable of eliciting an effect may also have deleterious side effects.

Certain naturopathic treatments offered by naturopaths, such as homeopathy, rolfing, and iridology, are widely considered pseudoscience or quackery. Stephen Barrett of QuackWatch and the National Council Against Health Fraud has stated that naturopathy is "simplistic and that its practices are riddled with quackery". "Non-scientific health care practitioners, including naturopaths, use unscientific methods and deception on a public who, lacking in-depth health care knowledge, must rely upon the assurance of providers. Quackery not only harms people, it undermines the ability to conduct scientific research and should be opposed by scientists", says William T. Jarvis. In the 2018 Australian case against Marlyin Bodnar, who advised a mother to treat her infant son's eczema with a raw food diet which nearly led to the child's starvation death, Judge Peter Berman said, "Well intentioned but seriously misguided advice is, as the facts of this case demonstrate, capable of causing great harm and even death to vulnerable children." Furthermore, Britt Hermes criticizes the "pervasive culture of patient blaming" among naturopathic practitioners, where "when something doesn't work for the patient and the patient is not experiencing all of the positive effects and zero side-effects that are promised with the therapy, it's never because the therapy doesn't work, it's because the patient didn't do something right."

=== Vaccination ===
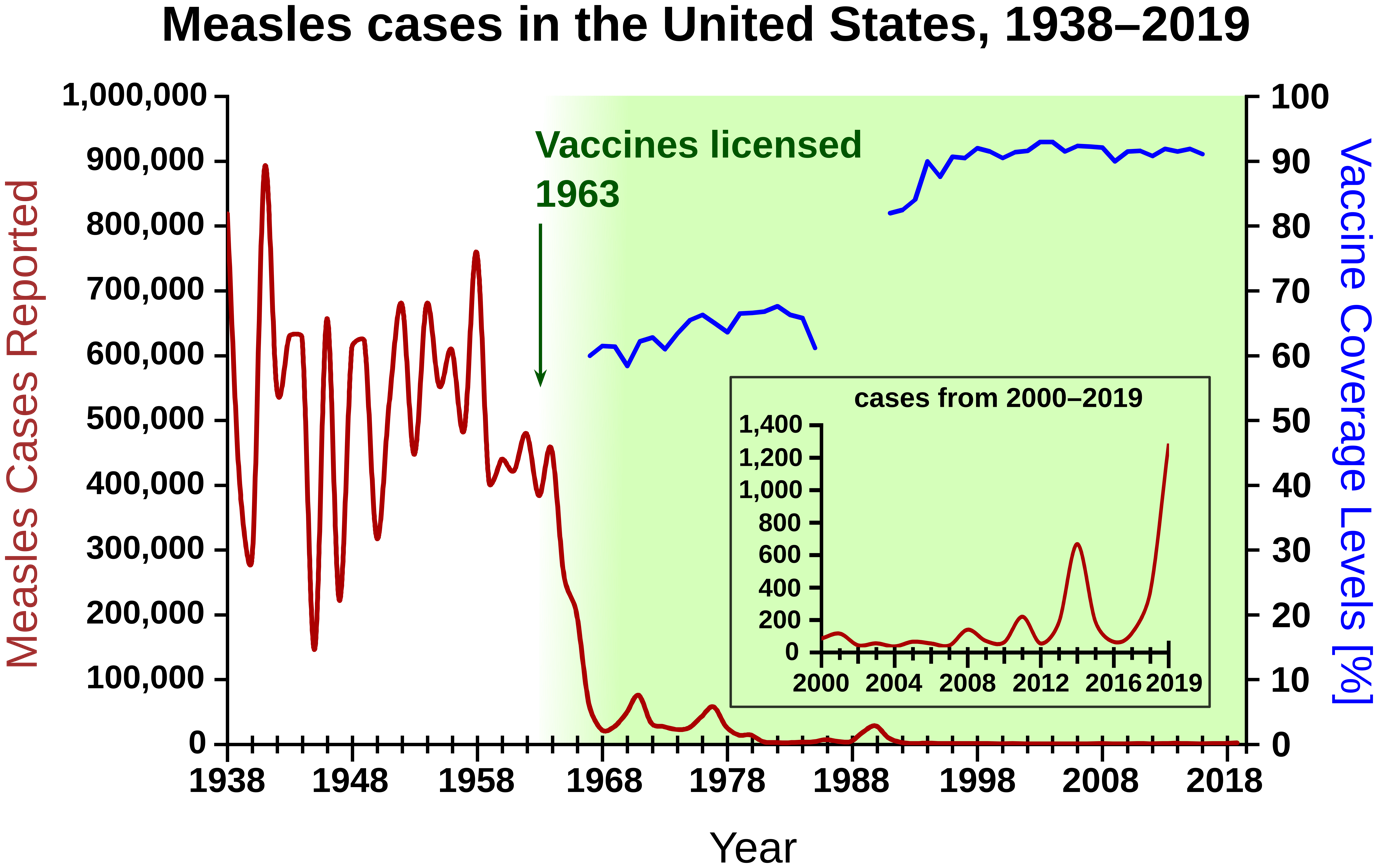
Measles cases reported in the United States fell dramatically after the introduction of the measles vaccine.

Many naturopathy practitioners voice their opposition to vaccination. The reasons for this opposition are based, in part, on the early views which shaped the foundation of this occupation. A naturopathy textbook, co-authored by Joseph Pizzorno, recalls anti-vaccine beliefs associated with the founding of naturopathy in the United States: "a return to nature in regulating the diet, breathing, exercising, bathing and the employment of various forces" in lieu of the smallpox vaccine.

In general, evidence about associations between naturopathy and pediatric vaccination is sparse, but "published reports suggest that only a minority of naturopathic physicians actively support full vaccination". In Washington state from 2000 to 2003, children were significantly less likely to receive immunizations if they had seen a naturopath. A survey of naturopathic students published in 2004 found that students at the Canadian College of Naturopathic Medicine became less likely to recommend vaccinations to their patients and became more distrustful of public health and conventional medicine as they advanced in the program.

The British Columbia Naturopathic Association lists several major concerns regarding the pediatric vaccine schedule and vaccines in general, and the group's policy is to not advocate for or against vaccines. The Oregon Association of Naturopathic Physicians reports that many naturopaths "customize" the pediatric vaccine schedule.

As of April 25, 2022, a British Columbia government report found that 69.2% of naturopaths reported having received at least two COVID vaccines or receiving a medical exemption. This was much lower than all the other regulated medical professions in the report. The number for two professions – dieticians and physicians/surgeons – was 98%.

As of 2016, the American Association of Naturopathic Physicians, which is the largest professional organization for licensed naturopaths in the U.S., is "still discussing its stance on vaccinations".

== Practitioners ==
Naturopath practitioners can generally be categorized into three groups: 1) those with a government issued license; 2) those who practice outside of an official status ("traditional naturopaths"); 3) those who are primarily another kind of health professional who also practices naturopathy.

In Switzerland, these divisions fall between those with a federal diploma, those recognized by health insurances, and those with neither federal diploma nor recognition by health insurances. Naturopaths with federal diploma can be divided into four categories: European traditional medicine, Chinese traditional medicine, ayurvedic medicine and homeopathy. The number of listed naturopaths (including traditional healers) in Switzerland rose from 223 in 1970 to 1835 in 2000.

=== Licensed naturopaths ===
Licensed naturopaths may be referred to as "naturopathic doctors" or "naturopathic physicians" in 26 US states or territories and 5 Canadian provinces. Licensed naturopaths present themselves as primary care providers. Licensed naturopaths do not receive comparable training to medical doctors in terms of the quality of education or quantity of hours.

In British Columbia, legislation permits licensed naturopaths to use the title "doctor" or "physician". However, section 102 of the bylaw of the College of Naturopathic Physicians of British Columbia (CNPBC), the terms "naturopathic" or "naturopathic medicine" must be included anytime the term doctor or physician is used by a member of the CNPBC.

==== Education ====
National University of Natural Medicine trains students in naturopathic medicine who are eligible to become licensed in some jurisdictions in North America.

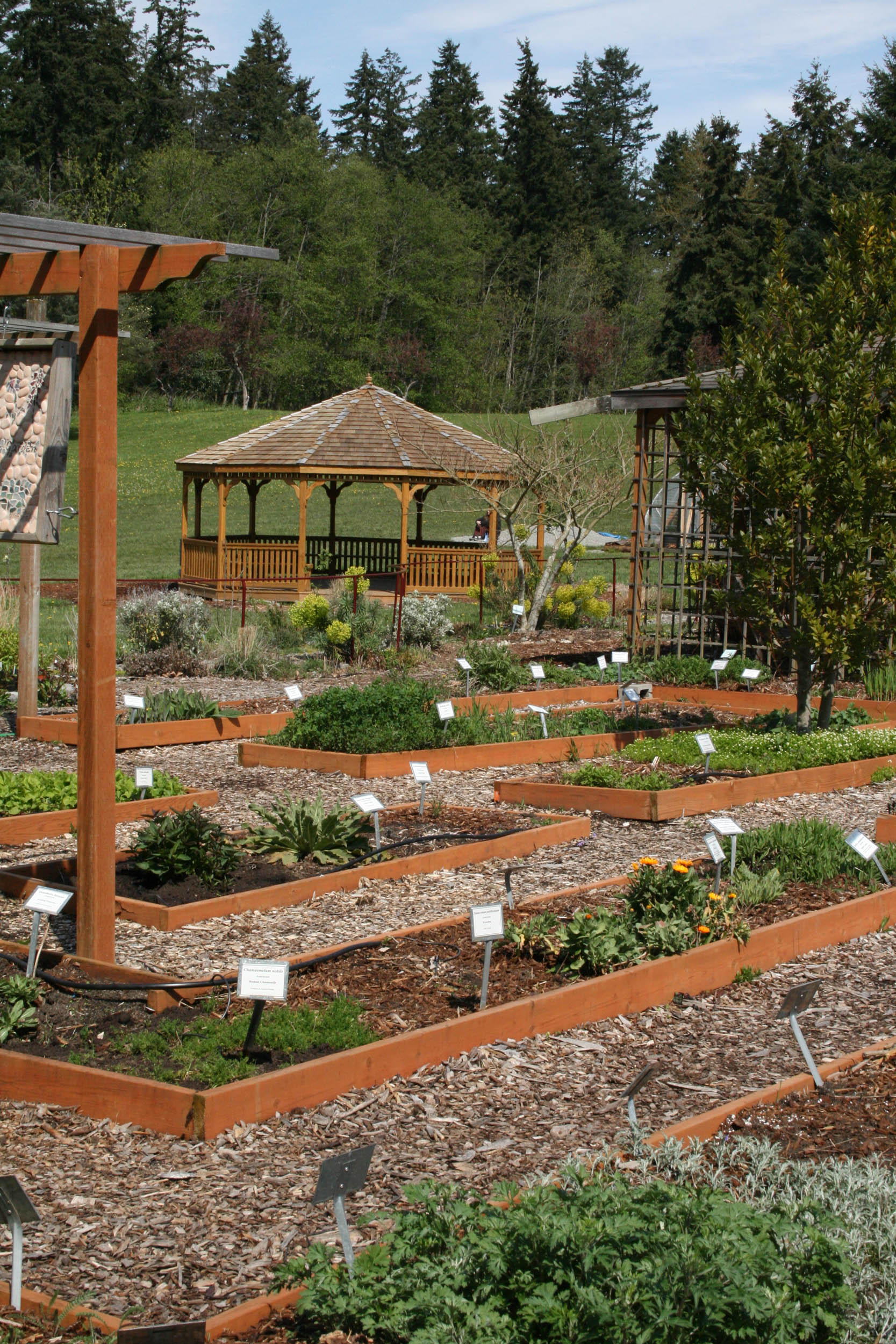
The herb garden at Bastyr University, another naturopathic program whose graduates can become licensed naturopaths in some North American jurisdictions

Licensed naturopaths must pass the Naturopathic Physicians Licensing Examinations (NPLEX) administered by the North American Board of Naturopathic Examiners (NABNE) after graduating from a program accredited by the Council on Naturopathic Medical Education (CNME). Training in CNME-accredited programs includes basic medical diagnostics and procedures such as rudimentary physical exams and common blood tests, in addition to pseudoscientific modalities, such as homeopathy, acupuncture, and energy modalities. These accredited programs have been criticized for misrepresenting their medical rigor and teaching subjects that are antithetical to the best understandings of science and medicine. The CNME as an accrediting authority has been characterized as unreliable and suffering from conflicts of interest. The naturopathic licensing exam has been called a mystery by those outside the naturopathic profession and criticized for testing on homeopathic remedies, including for the use to treat pediatric emergencies.

Several schools in North America exist for the study of naturopathic medicine, some accredited by the CNME. The CNME and the Association of Accredited Naturopathic Medical Colleges (AANMC) claim entrance requirements and curricula at accredited colleges are often similar or comparable to those required and offered at conventional medical schools. However, the lack of accreditation by the Liaison Committee on Medical Education may indicate insufficiency of scientific medical training and/or quantifiable positive results, and accordingly it remains disputed whether graduates of medical colleges accredited by the CNME have the competency of Medical Doctors and Doctors of Osteopathy.

Naturopathic doctors are not eligible for medical residencies, which are available exclusively for medical doctors and doctors of osteopathic medicine. There are limited post-graduate "residency" positions available to naturopathic doctors offered through naturopathic schools and naturopathic clinics approved by the CNME. Most naturopathic doctors do not complete such a residency, and naturopathic doctors are not mandated to complete one for licensure, except in the states of Utah and Connecticut. Continuing education in naturopathic modalities for health care professionals varies greatly.

==== Political activity in the United States ====
Naturopathic practitioners affiliated with the CNME-accredited schools lobby state, provincial, and federal governments for medical licensure and participation in social health programs. The American Association of Naturopathic Physicians represents licensed naturopaths in the United States; the Canadian Association of Naturopathic Doctors represents licensed naturopaths in Canada. Naturopathic lobbying efforts are funded by vitamin and supplement makers and focus on portraying naturopathic education as comparable to medical education received by physicians and on having high professional standards. Medical societies and advocacy groups dispute these claims by citing evidence of licensed naturopathic practitioners using pseudoscientific methods without a sound evidence basis and lacking adequate clinical training to diagnose and treat disease competently according to the standard of care. Jann Bellamy has characterized the process by which naturopathic practitioners and other practitioners of pseudoscience convince lawmakers to provide them with medical licenses as "legislative alchemy".

Since 2005, the Massachusetts Medical Society has opposed licensure based on concerns that NDs are not required to participate in residency and concerns that the practices of naturopaths included many "erroneous and potentially dangerous claims". The Massachusetts Special Commission on Complementary and Alternative Medical Practitioners rejected their concerns and recommended licensure. The Massachusetts Medical Society states:

Naturopathic medical school is not a medical school in anything but the appropriation of the word medical. Naturopathy is not a branch of medicine. It is a hodge podge of nutritional advice, home remedies and discredited treatments ... Naturopathic colleges claim accreditation but follow a true "alternative" accreditation method that is virtually meaningless. They are not accredited by the same bodies that accredit real medical schools and while some courses have similar titles to the curricula of legitimate medical schools the content is completely different.

In 2015, a former naturopathic doctor, Britt Marie Hermes, who graduated from Bastyr University and practiced as a licensed ND in Washington and Arizona, began advocating against naturopathic medicine. In addition to opposing further licensure, she believes that NDs should not be allowed to use the titles "doctor" or "physician", and should be barred from treating children. She states:

Naturopaths aggressively lobby for laws to issue them medical licenses. I would characterize this political effort as a perverted redefinition of the words "physician", "doctor", "medical school", and "residency" in order to mask the inadequacy of the training provided in naturopathic programs. ND students do not realize that they are taking educational shortcuts and therefore do not possess any demonstrable competencies found in modern medicine.

=== Traditional naturopaths ===
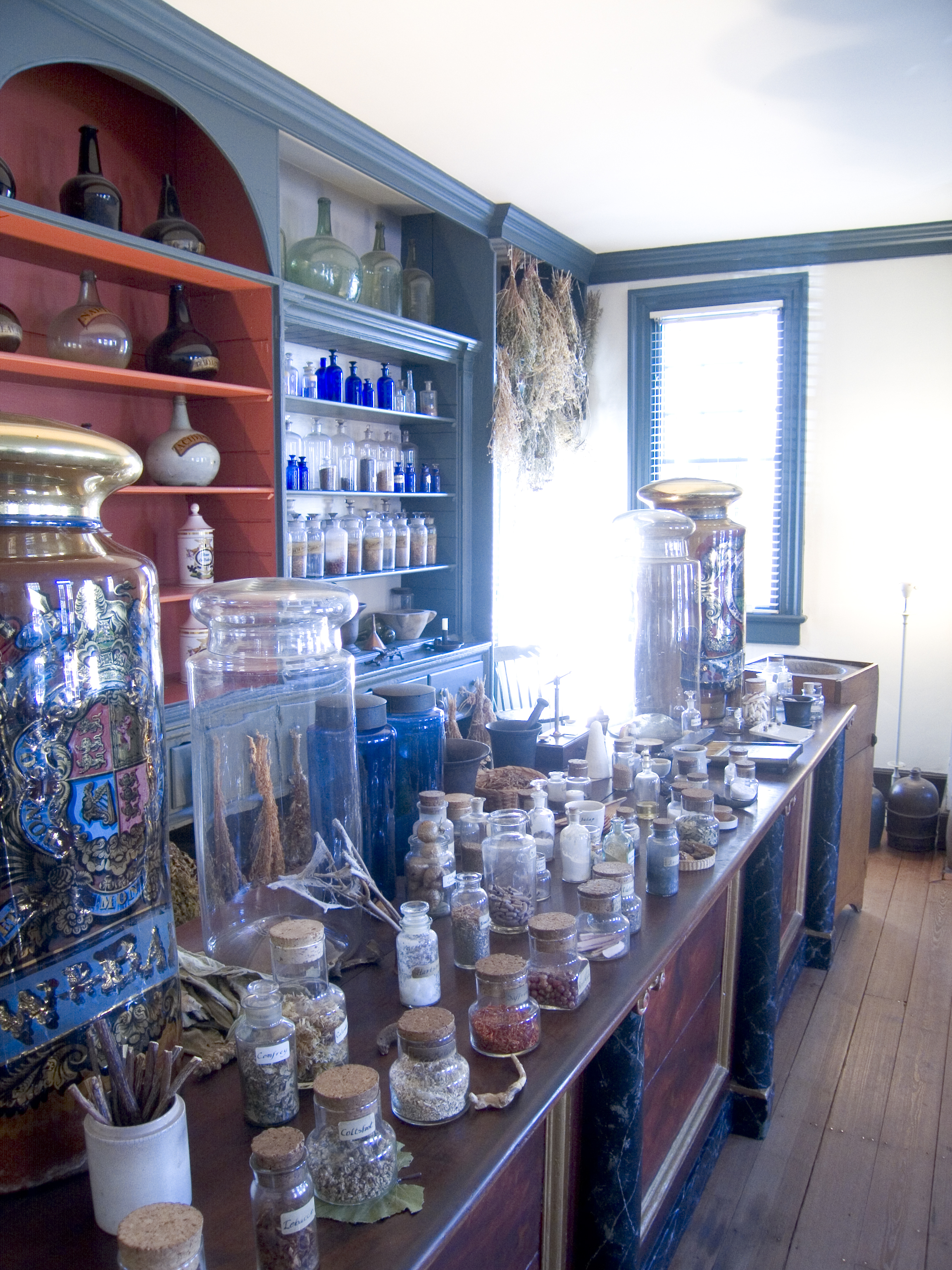
Hugh Mercer Apothecary in Fredericksburg, Virginia, a pharmacy founded by Hugh Mercer, a Scottish physician, in the mid-18th century. It is now a museum demonstrating 18th-century medical treatments.

Traditional naturopaths are represented in the United States by the American Naturopathic Association (ANA), representing about 1,800 practitioners and the American Naturopathic Medical Association (ANMA).

The level of naturopathic training varies among traditional naturopaths in the United States. Traditional naturopaths may complete non-degree certificate programs or undergraduate degree programs and generally refer to themselves as naturopathic consultants. These programs often offer online unaccredited degrees, but do not offer comprehensive biomedical education or clinical training.

Traditional naturopathic practitioners surveyed in Australia perceive evidence-based medicine to be an ideological assault on their beliefs in vitalistic and holistic principles. They advocate for the integrity of natural medicine practice.

Naturopaths graduating from accredited programs argued in 2002 that their training used evidence-based scientific principles unlike traditional naturopathic programs, but this claim remains inaccurate.

== Regulation ==
Naturopathy is practiced in many countries and is subject to different standards of regulation and levels of acceptance. The scope of practice varies widely between jurisdictions, with some covering naturopathy under medical regulation and allowing practitioners to prescribe drugs and perform minor surgery, while other jurisdictions outlaw naturopathy entirely.

=== Australia ===
In 1977, a Commonwealth Government inquiry reviewed all colleges of naturopathy in Australia and found that despite having syllabuses appearing to cover the basic biomedical sciences, actual lectures had little connection to those syllabuses and no significant practical work was available. In addition, there did not appear to be significant or systematic coverage of techniques favoured by naturopaths, such as homeopathy, Bach's floral remedies, or mineral salts.

The position of the Australian Medical Association is that "evidence-based aspects of complementary medicine can be part of patient care by a medical practitioner", but it has concerns that there is "limited efficacy evidence regarding most complementary medicine. Unproven complementary medicines and therapies can pose a risk to patient health either directly through misuse or indirectly if a patient defers seeking medical advice." The AMA's position on regulation is that "there should be appropriate regulation of complementary medicine practitioners and their activities".

In 2015, the Australian government found no clear evidence of effectiveness for naturopathy. Accordingly, In 2017 the Australian government named naturopathy as a practice that would not qualify for insurance subsidies, saying this step would "ensure taxpayer funds are expended appropriately and not directed to therapies lacking evidence".

=== India ===
In India, naturopathy is overseen by the Department of Ayurveda, Yoga and Naturopathy, Unani, Siddha and Homoeopathy (AYUSH); there is a 5½-year degree in "Bachelor of Naturopathy and Yogic Sciences" (BNYS) degree that was offered by twelve colleges in India as of August 2010. The National Institute of Naturopathy in Pune that operates under AYUSH, which was established on December 22, 1986, and encourages facilities for standardization and propagation of the existing knowledge and its application through research in naturopathy throughout India.

=== North America ===
In five Canadian provinces, seventeen U.S. states, and the District of Columbia, naturopathic doctors who are trained at an accredited school of naturopathic medicine in North America are entitled to use the designation ND or NMD. Elsewhere, the designations "naturopath", "naturopathic doctor", and "doctor of natural medicine" are generally unprotected or prohibited.

In North America, each jurisdiction that regulates naturopathy defines a local scope of practice for naturopathic doctors that can vary considerably. Some regions permit minor surgery, access to prescription drugs, spinal manipulations, midwifery (natural childbirth), and gynecology; other regions exclude these from the naturopathic scope of practice or prohibit the practice of naturopathy entirely.

==== Canada ====
Five Canadian provinces license naturopathic doctors: Ontario, British Columbia, Manitoba, Saskatchewan, and Alberta. British Columbia has the largest scope of practice in Canada, allowing certified NDs to prescribe pharmaceuticals and perform minor surgeries. Ontario also permits prescription from a modified formulary list, following separate examination.

==== United States ====
- U.S. jurisdictions that currently regulate or license naturopathy include Alaska, Arizona, California, Connecticut, Colorado, Delaware, District of Columbia, Hawaii, Idaho, Kansas, Maine, Maryland, Massachusetts, Minnesota, Montana, New Hampshire, New Mexico, North Dakota, Oregon, Pennsylvania, Rhode Island, Wisconsin, Puerto Rico, US Virgin Islands, Utah, Vermont, and Washington. Additionally, Virginia licenses the practice of naturopathy under a grandfather clause. (This was previously also the case in Florida, though currently no practitioners remain active under the grandfather provisions).
  - U.S. jurisdictions that permit access to prescription drugs: Arizona, California, District of Columbia, Hawaii, Idaho, Kansas, Maine, Montana, New Hampshire, New Mexico, Oregon, Utah, Vermont, and Washington.
  - U.S. jurisdictions that permit minor surgery: Arizona, District of Columbia, Kansas, Maine, Montana, Oregon, Utah, Vermont, and Washington.
- Three U.S. states specifically prohibit the practice of naturopathy: Florida, South Carolina and Tennessee.

=== Switzerland ===
The Swiss Federal Constitution defines the Swiss Confederation and the Cantons of Switzerland within the scope of their powers to oversee complementary medicine. In particular, the Federal authorities must set up diplomas for the practice of non-scientific medicine. The first of such diplomas has been validated in April 2015 for the practice of naturopathy. There is a long tradition of naturopathy and traditional medicine in Switzerland. The Cantons of Switzerland make their own public health regulations. Although the law in certain cantons is typically monopolistic, the authorities are relatively tolerant with regard to alternative practitioners.

=== United Kingdom ===
Naturopathy is not regulated in the United Kingdom. In 2012, publicly funded universities in the United Kingdom dropped their alternative medicine programs, including naturopathy.

== See also ==
- Appeal to nature
- Arnold Ehret
- Essential nutrient
- Friedrich Eduard Bilz
- Barbara O'Neill
- Health freedom movement
- Heilpraktiker
- Kneipp facility
- List of ineffective cancer treatments
- List of topics characterized as pseudoscience
- Megavitamin therapy
- Orthomolecular medicine
- Osteopathy and osteopathic medicine
- Phytonutrient
- Therapeutic nihilism
