= William M. London =

American professor of public health and consumer advocate

William Matthew London
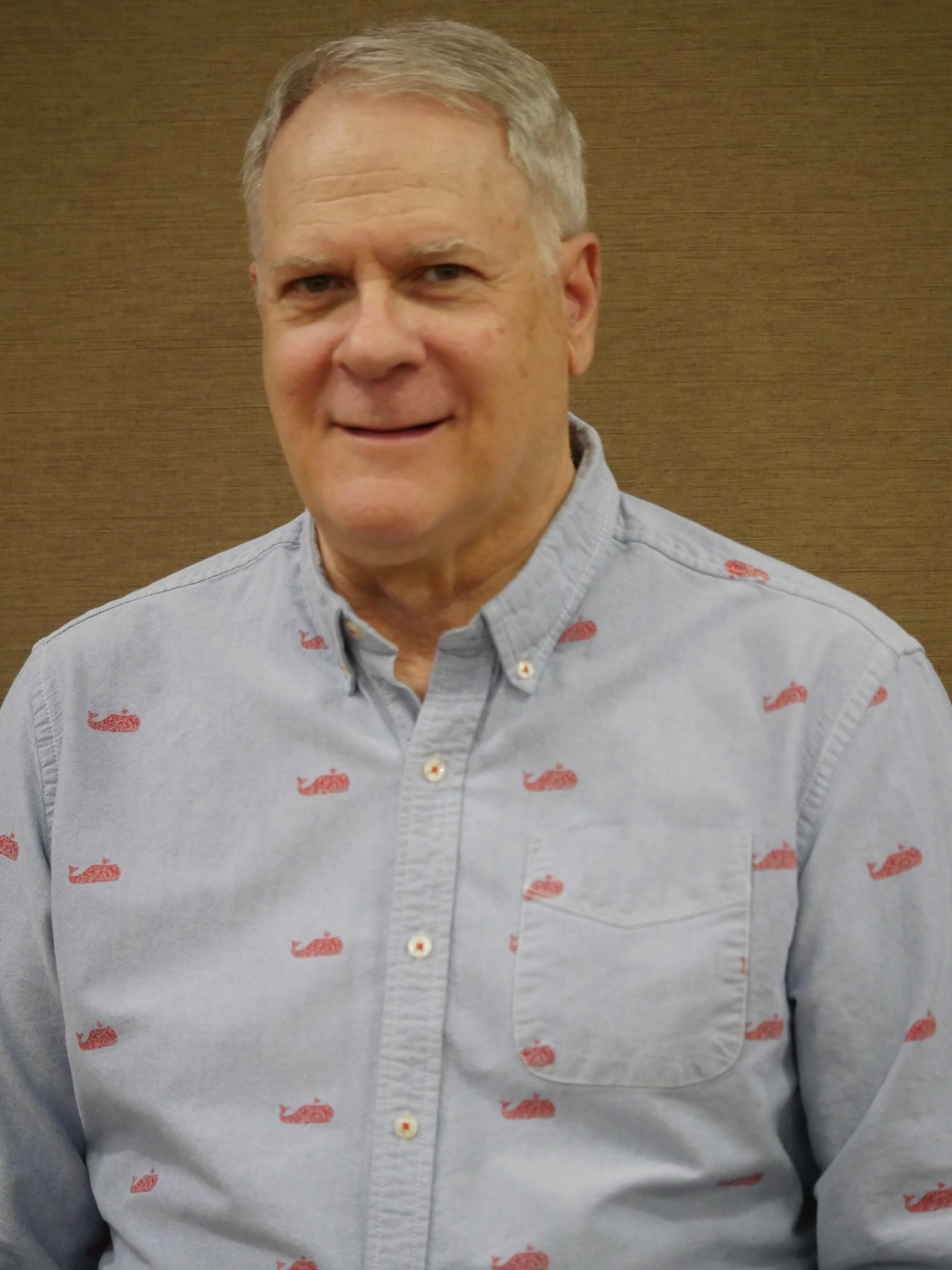
- Known for: Consumer advocacy
- Title: Professor of Public Health

Academic background
- Education: BA Biological Sciences, University at Buffalo SUNY; BA Geography, University at Buffalo SUNY; Ed.M. Educational Psychology, University at Buffalo SUNY; Ed.M. Health Education, University at Buffalo SUNY; Ed.D. Health Education, University at Buffalo SUNY; M.P.H., Loma Linda University
- Alma mater: University at Buffalo SUNY

Academic work
- Discipline: Public health
- Sub-discipline: Consumer health
- Institutions: Kent State University; College of Saint Elizabeth; Charles R. Drew University of Medicine and Science; California State University, Los Angeles
- Website: calstatela.edu/faculty/william-m-london

William Matthew London is an American professor of public health and a consumer advocate. He is the editor of the Quackwatch network's weekly electronic newsletter Consumer Health Digest and has written for both professional and general audiences. Health fraud figures prominently among his writing and research interests.

== Academic career ==
Prior to his pursuit of higher education, London was an alumnus of Hillcrest High School (Queens), and graduated in the class of 1975 along with Fran Drescher and Ray Romano.

Attending the University at Buffalo SUNY, London holds undergraduate degrees in biological sciences and in geography; both an Ed.M. in educational psychology and an Ed.M in Health Education and an Ed.D. in health education. He also obtained a M.P.H. from Loma Linda University.

He taught at a variety of universities (Kent State, Saint Elizabeth, Charles Drew), before landing at California State University, Los Angeles for the 2006–2007 school year, in the health science program. While at Charles Drew, he established the university's Master of Public Health in Urban Public Health, which aims at training public health professionals in disease prevention and health promotion "for culturally diverse and medically underserved urban communities".

He is a section editor of the Californian Journal of Health Promotion, and a member of the Review Board of the American Journal of Health Behavior. He is a former senior editor for the journal Focus on Alternative and Complementary Therapies and a former contributing editor for The Scientific Review of Alternative Medicine and Aberrant Medical Practices.

While living in Ohio, he planned and delivered training programs in drug abuse prevention for school personnel, for a period of four years. Arguing that the American Government's "war on drugs" during the 1990s has more to do with a moral panic than with public health, London has publicly called for an end to the strong emphasis law enforcement agencies have placed on the prohibition of drugs during that period. His interventions on drug policy include testimonies to legislative committees, notably the Subcommittee on Select Education and Civil Rights of the United States House Committee on Education and Labor in 1993.

== Consumer advocacy ==
With Stephen Barrett and others, London co-authored several editions of Consumer Health: A Guide to Intelligent Decisions.

He is a former president of the National Council Against Health Fraud (NCAHF), a nonprofit aimed at providing science-based information to consumers so that they can recognize fraud and misinformation on health matters. As the group's representative, he delivered a statement to the White House Commission on Complementary and Alternative Medicine Policy, in which he asked the Commission to recognize "the need to identify health fraud and quackery masquerading as 'complementary' and 'alternative' medicine" and made four recommendations to that effect.

He started assisting Stephen Barrett in editing NCAHF's electronic newsletter Consumer Health Digest in 2002 and has served as the editor since 2018. The publication was founded by Barrett in 2001 and as of 2018 it shipped electronically to 10,500 subscribers weekly. A conference on health fraud he organized in 1988 led to the creation of the Ohio Council Against Health Fraud (with London as president), as a state chapter of the national organization.

London denounces unethical practices of some chiropractors and other alternative health practitioners in the media and specialized publications.

London co-hosts the Credential Watch website since 2005. He's a Skeptical Inquirer columnist and a consultant to the Committee on Skeptical Inquiry. He writes in The Scientific Review of Alternative Medicine and Aberrant Medical Practices as a contributing editor. He was made a Fellow of the Committee for Skeptical Inquiry in 2020.

== Selected publications ==
- Napier, Kristine M.; London, William M.; Whelan, Elizabeth M. (1996). Cigarettes what the warning label doesn't tell you. The first comprehensive guide to the health consequences of smoking. New York: American Council on Science and Health.
- Barrett, Stephen; London, William; Jarvis, William T.; Kroger, Manfred (1997). Consumer Health: A Guide To Intelligent Decisions (6th ed.). Brown Benchmark. ISBN 9780072505115.
- London, William M.; Whelan, Elizabeth M.; Nwosu, Matthew C.; Kleiman, Cindy F.; Zdorovyak, Inna (1998). "An evaluation of the environmental health chapters in high school health textbooks". Journal of Health Education. 29 (6): 339–345. doi:10.1080/10556699.1998.10603364 – via Taylor & Francis Online.
- London, William M.; Whelan, Elizabeth M.; Kava, Ruth (2000). "Expert reviews of health reports on CBS Television's 60 Minutes, 1978-1995". Technology. 7 (5): 539–552.
- Barrett, Stephen; London, William; Jarvis, William T.; Kroger, Manfred (2001). Consumer Health: A Guide To Intelligent Decisions (7th ed.). McGraw-Hill Education. ISBN 9780072485219.
- Barrett, Stephen; London, William; Baratz, Robert; Kroger, Manfred (2006). Consumer Health: A Guide To Intelligent Decisions (8th ed.). McGraw-Hill Education. ISBN 9780072972238.
- Barrett, Stephen; London, William; Baratz, Robert; Kroger, Manfred; Hall, Harriet (2012). Consumer Health: A Guide To Intelligent Decisions (9th ed.). McGraw-Hill Education. ISBN 9780078028489.
