= Harriet Hall =

American medical doctor and skeptic (1945–2023)

Harriet A. Hall
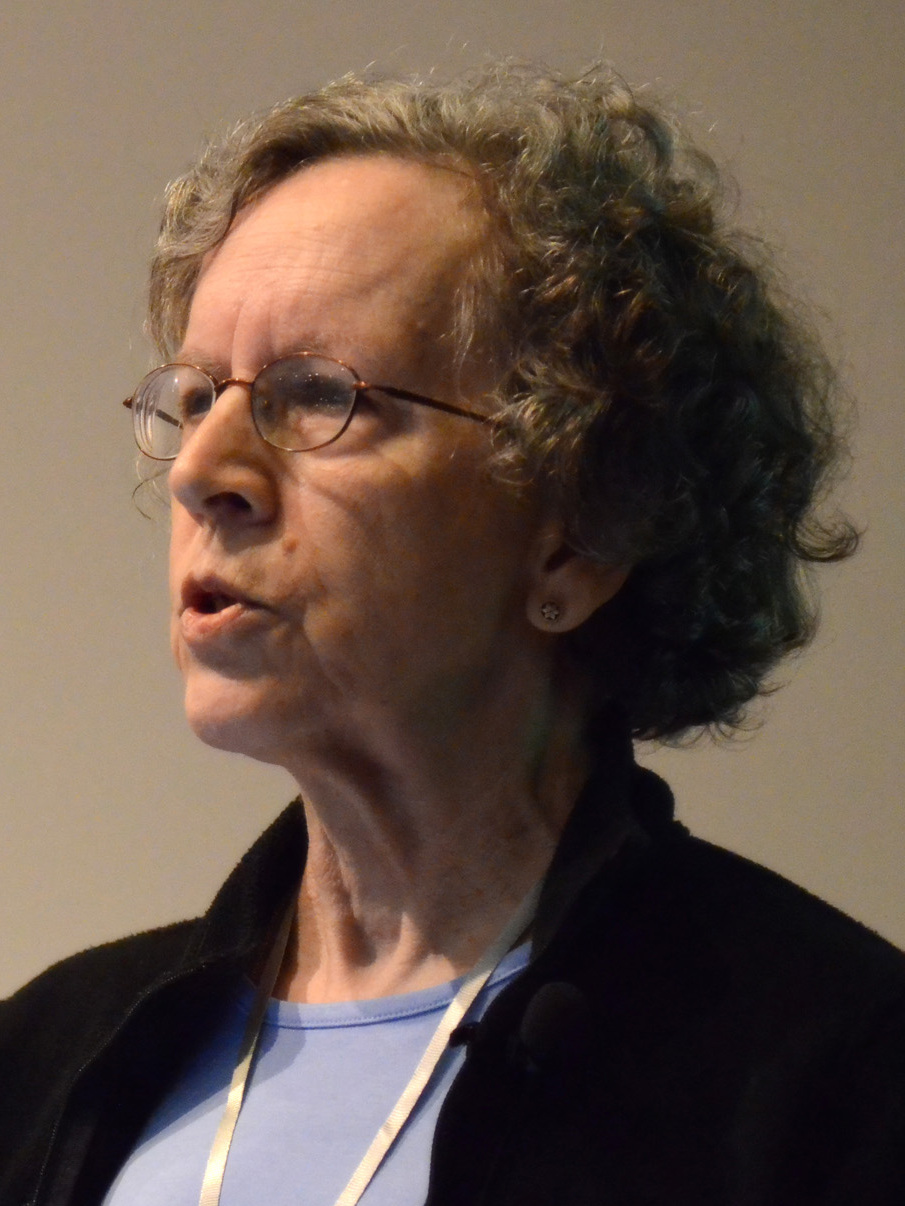
- Hall speaking in November 2016
- Born: Harriet Anne Hoag; July 2, 1945; St. Louis, Missouri, U.S.
- Died: January 11, 2023 (aged 77); Puyallup, Washington, U.S.
- Education: University of Washington
- Spouse: Kirk Hall
- Children: 2
- Military career
- Allegiance: United States
- Branch: United States Air Force
- Service years: 1969–1989
- Rank: Colonel
- Awards: Meritorious Service Medal
- Other work: Medical blogger and critic of alternative medicine
- Harriet Hall's voice Recorded March 2014
- Website: www.skepdoc.info

Harriet A. Hall (July 2, 1945 – January 11, 2023) was an American family physician, U.S. Air Force flight surgeon, author, science communicator, and skeptic. She wrote about alternative medicine and quackery for the magazines Skeptic and Skeptical Inquirer and was a regular contributor and founding editor of Science-Based Medicine. She wrote under her own name or used the pseudonym "The SkepDoc". After retiring as a colonel in the U.S. Air Force, Hall was a frequent speaker at science and skepticism related conventions in the US and around the world.

== Early life and education ==
Harriet Anne Hoag was born on July 2, 1945, in St. Louis, Missouri. The oldest of four siblings, she was raised in the View Ridge neighborhood of Seattle, Washington. While in her teens, she began to question her Methodist upbringing, later becoming an atheist.

Hoag attended the University of Washington, where she was awarded a baccalaureate degree in Spanish language and literature. She went on to the University of Washington School of Medicine to earn a Doctor of Medicine in 1970.

In 1971, Hoag did an internship at David Grant USAF Medical Center in California. She was then stationed in Spain for seven years as a general medical officer.

Hoag pursued aerospace medicine to become a flight surgeon, graduating in 1979 and becoming certified in family medicine. She began her assignment at Francis E. Warren Air Force Base in Wyoming, where she met and married Kirk Albert Hall Jr. She was the second woman to complete her medical internship in the Air Force and was the first female graduate of the Air Force family medicine residency at Eglin Air Force Base in Florida.

== Career ==
Hall served in the U.S. Air Force for 20 years. She retired as a full colonel from Joint Base Lewis–McChord in Washington state.

Hall said she had been a "passive skeptic" for quite some time, only reading the literature and attending the various meetings. In 2002, she met Wallace Sampson at the Skeptic's Toolbox workshop in Eugene, Oregon. Sampson encouraged Hall to write an article for the Scientific Review of Alternative Medicine testing so-called "Vitamin O" products she had seen advertised in the mail. She then began writing articles for Skeptical Inquirer. Hall spoke with Michael Shermer at The Amazing Meeting in 2005 about the book The God Code and he asked her write a review of it for Skeptic magazine. From 2006 to 2023 she had a regular column in Skeptic magazine titled The SkepDoc, which was also used as the name of her website. Before the Toolbox, "I had not done any writing... one thing led to another and now I'm on the faculty of the Skeptic's Toolbox."

In 2008 she published Women Aren't Supposed to Fly: The Memoirs of a Female Flight Surgeon, an autobiography focusing on her experiences as a flight surgeon in the U.S. Air Force (she retired as a full colonel). As a female physician, air force officer, pilot and flight surgeon, she was a minority in several respects, and encountered prejudice. The title of the book refers to an incident after her first solo flight when an airport official told her, "Didn't anybody ever tell you women aren't supposed to fly?"

In 2008, Hall was among the five founding editors to launch Science-Based Medicine. In addition to serving as an editor, she contributed over 700 articles to Science-Based Medicine.

Hall spoke at the Science-Based Medicine Conference and The Amazing Meeting 7, among other venues in 2009. She was interviewed on podcasts such as The Reality Check, Skepticality and The Skeptic Zone.

Starting in the January 2010 issue, Hall had a regular 250-word column debunking common health myths in O, The Oprah Magazine. Her relationship with the magazine was rocky, and the column ended in the June 2010 issue. She later said about this experience that "The editor who hired me was replaced by a less sympathetic one (...). They restricted me to a measly 200 words and wanted to tell me exactly what to write about and what to say. I couldn’t even recognize the final edited version as my writing."

Hall was on the board and had been a founding member of the Institute for Science in Medicine, formed in 2009. In 2010 she was elected a Fellow of the Committee for Skeptical Inquiry.

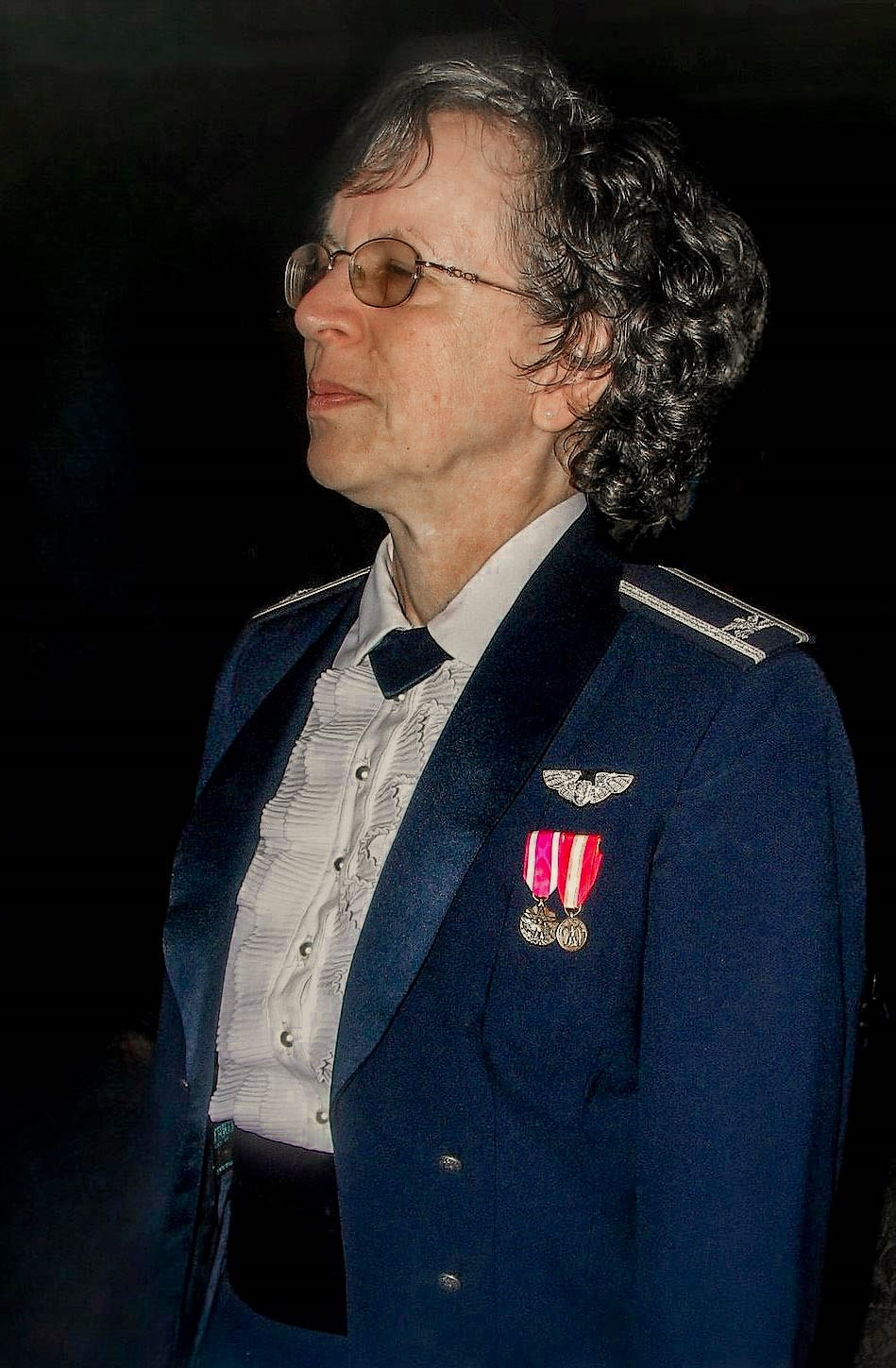
Hall on the JREF Amazing Adventure — North to Alaska

On August 21, 2010, Hall was honored with an award recognizing her contributions in the skeptical field, from the IIG during its 10th Anniversary Gala.

Hall spoke at the 6th World Skeptic Congress in Berlin, "Complementary and Alternative Medicine: Fairy Tale Science and Placebo Medicine".

In 2015 she published a YouTube lecture series entitled "Science Based Medicine", commissioned by the James Randi Educational Foundation. It is presented as a course consisting of ten lectures regarding the differences between science-based and evidence-based medicine, complementary and alternative medicine (CAM), chiropractic, acupuncture, homeopathy, naturopathy, and herbal medicine, energy medicine, miscellaneous "alternatives", pitfalls in research, and science-based medicine in the media and politics.

From 2018, Hall published a regular column in Skeptical Inquirer called "Reality Is the Best Medicine".

== Criticism of alternative medicine ==
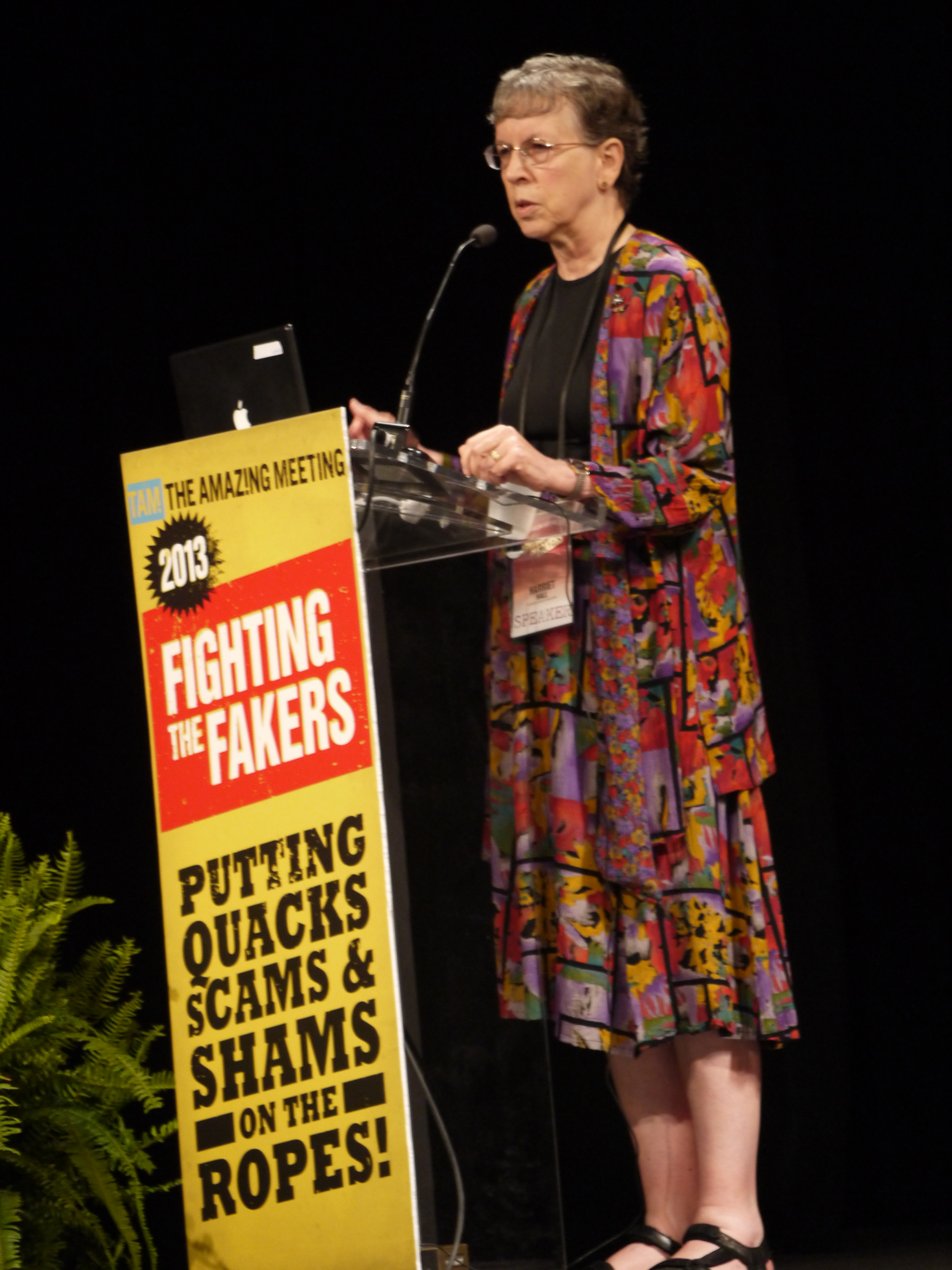
Hall speaking at The Amazing Meeting in 2013

Hall was an outspoken critic of alternative medicine, often questioning its effectiveness. "If it were shown to be truly effective, it would be part of regular medicine." In her work she emphasized the importance of following the scientific evidence for or against any remedy. When asked about the cold remedy Airborne she said, "There's more evidence for chicken soup than for Airborne. In the absence of any credible double-blind studies to support the claims for Airborne, I'll stick to hand washing." She criticized the U.S. Army for its use of acupuncture: "the idea that putting needles in somebody's ear is going to substitute for things like morphine is just ridiculous."

Hall publicly criticized the recommendations and products of Daniel G. Amen in an article at Quackwatch and elsewhere, saying "Amen's recommendations defy science, common sense and logic." She criticized many other proponents of alternative therapies, including Andrew Weil.

Hall was an advisor to Quackwatch as well as an Associate Editor and frequent author of the Science-Based Medicine blog.

In 2022, Hall published a children's book called There's No Such Thing as the Tooth Fairy! about kids who debate the existence of the tooth fairy. Hall had previously coined the term "tooth fairy science" to refer to studying a phenomenon before establishing its existence.

Hall emphasized her "SkepDoc's Rule", which states: "Before you believe a claim, find out who disagrees with it and why." She elaborates, "Once you have located the opposing arguments you can evaluate which side has the most credible evidence and the fewest logical fallacies. It's usually easy to spot the winner."

Hall firmly advocated for only one standard of evidence:

Science-based medicine has one rigorous standard of evidence, the kind [used for pharmaceuticals] .... CAM has a double standard. They gladly accept a lower standard of evidence for treatments they believe in. However, I suspect they would reject a pharmaceutical if it were approved for marketing on the kind of evidence they accept for CAM.

== Review of Irreversible Damage ==
On June 15, 2021, Hall published a book review of Irreversible Damage in Science-Based Medicine (SBM) stating that the book "brings up some alarming facts that desperately need to be looked into", that the affirmative care model for gender dysphoria in children "is a mistake and a dereliction of duty", and that the current political climate has made scientific study of these matters nearly impossible.

Within two days, the review was removed and replaced with a retraction notice authored by Steven Novella and David Gorski. They stated that the health protocols for dealing with gender dysphoria in children were misrepresented and argued that an increase in gender dysphoria diagnoses can be explained without invoking a theory of social contagion, as well as stating that the science behind gender-affirming care indicates it improves mental health. Novella and Gorski emphasized that Hall was still an editor in good standing at Science-Based Medicine, and praised her history of promoting good science.

Science-Based Medicine also published a series of articles from doctors specialising in LGBTQ+ health care, which were critical of the book and Hall's positive review. Several skeptics supported Hall including the evolutionary biologist Jerry Coyne and SBM editor emeritus Kimball Atwood who advised SBM to retain Hall's review and criticized Novella and Gorski's decision to censor it. When journalist Jesse Singal criticized Novella and Gorski's retraction of Hall's original article and the factual accuracy of the follow-up articles, his critique was also met with criticism.

Hall's review of Shrier's book was republished at Skeptic.com, and an updated version that responded to the criticisms was published on her personal website.

== Personal life and death ==
At Francis E. Warren Air Force Base, she met and married Kirk Albert Hall Jr., who would also retire from the Air Force. Together they had two daughters.

Later in life, Hall resided in Puyallup, Washington. In her last years she suffered from arrhythmia and heart failure. She died in her sleep on January 11, 2023, at the age of 77.

== Selected publications ==
Highlights and publications mentioned in this article:

- Barrett, S.; WM London; M Kroger; H Hall; R Baratz (2012). Consumer Health: A Guide to Intelligent Decisions (9th ed.). McGraw-Hill. ISBN 978-0-07-802848-9.
- Hall, Harriet A. (Spring–Summer 2003), "Analysis of Claims and of an Experiment to Prove That Oxygen is Present in "Vitamin O"", Scientific Review of Alternative Medicine, 7 (1): 29–33
- Hall, Harriet A. (May–June 2003a), "Wired to the Kitchen Sink: Studying Weird Claims for Fun and Profit", Skeptical Inquirer, vol. 27, no. 3, Committee for Skeptical Inquiry, pp. 46–48
- Hall, Harriet A. (Fall 2003), "Chiropractic Information in a Public Library", Scientific Review of Alternative Medicine, 7 (2): 78–86
- Hall, Harriet A. (2007a) [2005], "A Skeptical View of SPECT Scans and Dr. Daniel Amen", Quackwatch
- Hall, Harriet A. (Spring–Summer 2005), "Blind-spot Mapping, Cortical Function, and Chiropractic Manipulation", Scientific Review of Alternative Medicine, 9 (1): 11–15
- Hall, Harriett (2005). "Seek & Ye Shall Find: The God Code (Book Review)". Skeptic. 11 (4).
- Hall, Harriet A. (May–June 2006), "Teaching Pigs to Sing: An Experiment in Bringing Critical Thinking to the Masses", Skeptical Inquirer, vol. 30, no. 3, pp. 36–39, archived from the original on June 2, 2013
- Hall, Harriet A. (June 24, 2008), "Death By Medicine", Science-Based Medicine
- Hall, Harriet A. (2008a). Women Aren't Supposed to Fly : The Memoirs of a Female Flight Surgeon. Lincoln, NE: iUniverse. p. 221. ISBN 978-0-595-49958-8. OCLC 263094055.
- Hall, Harriet; Howell, Kevin (2022). There's No Such Thing as the Tooth Fairy!. Lincoln, NE: BookBaby. p. 36. ISBN 978-1-66785-244-7.
