= Hawayo Takata =

Japanese-American Reiki practitioner

Hawayo Hiromi Takata (December 24, 1900 – December 11, 1980) was a Japanese-American woman born in Hanamaulu, Territory of Hawaii, who helped introduce the spiritual practice of Reiki to the Western World. Takata even went so far as to recommend that Reiki masters be ordained as ministers (somewhere in the 1980s, some became ministers in the Universal Brotherhood Movement, Inc.).

Takata was trained in Reiki by Chujiro Hayashi in Tokyo, Japan and became a Master Practitioner by 1940. Hayashi had learned from Mikao Usui, the first teacher of Reiki, in the early 1900s. Identification of training lineage is common among Reiki practitioners. Within the tradition, Takata is sometimes known as Reiki Grand Master Teacher Hawayo Takata.

Takata died at 2.45 a.m. on December 11, 1980 at Van Buren County Memorial Hospital, in Keosauqua, Iowa.
