= Chujiro Hayashi =

Developer of Reiki (1880–1940)

Chūjirō Hayashi
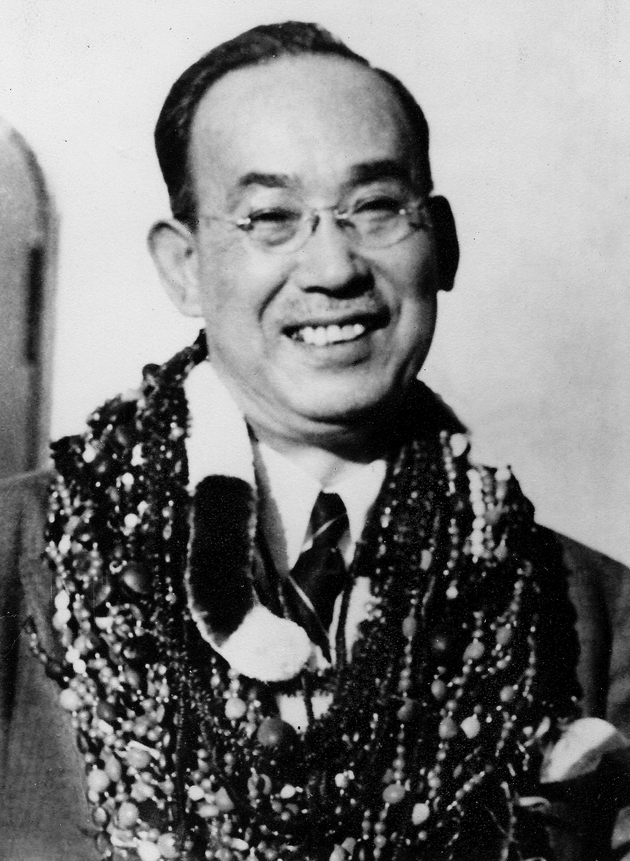
- Born: 15 September 1880; Tokyo, Japan
- Died: 11 May 1940 (aged 59); Atami, Japan
- Cause of death: ritual suicide
- Occupation: naval surgeon
- Known for: Reiki

Chujiro Hayashi (林 忠次郎, Hayashi Chūjirō; 15 September 1880 – 11 May 1940), a disciple of Mikao Usui, played a major role in the transmission of Reiki out of Japan.

Hayashi was a naval physician and employed Reiki to treat his patients. He began studying with Usui in the early 1920s. He made his branch, Hayashi Reiki Kenkyu-kai in Tokyo, Shinano-machi while his master Usui was still alive, and has kept the way of Usui's teaching.

Hayashi initiated and trained Hawayo Takata and helped her bring Reiki to Hawaii. He also trained Chiyoko Yamaguchi, the founder of Jikiden Reiki.

In 1940, Hayashi committed seppuku, a Japanese form of ritual suicide.

== Life ==
Chujiro Hayashi was born in Tokyo on September 15, 1880. Having graduated from the 30th class at the Japan Naval Academy in 1902, he served in a port-patrolling division in the Russo-Japanese War from February 4 of that year until a peace treaty concluded the War on September 5, 1906.

In 1918 he became a Director of Ominato Port Defence Station where Kanichi Taketomi (later to become the 3rd chairman of Usui Ryoho Gakkai) was the Chief of Staff. "Ominato" was a port located at the foot of Mt Osore, Shimokita Peninsula in Aomori, in the North of Japan. At that time, defense ports were regarded as the second most important ports after Naval Base ports.

Hayashi had a wife and two children. His wife, Chie, was born in 1887 and married him after she graduated from Shizuoka Women's High School. Their first child, Tadayoshi, was born in 1903 and majored in economics at Keio University. Kiyoe, their second child, was born 7 years later and she went on to study at the same school as her mother.

== Activities ==
In the beginning of the 1920s Hayashi became a student of Mikao Usui, the founder of Reiki. Being a physician, he soon became one of Usui's prominent students in the Usui Reiki Ryoho Gakkai. Later on he became instrumental in the worldwide spread of Reiki. In 1925 Hayashi became a Shihan, and on January 16, 1926, he became a senior teacher and a board member of the Usui Reiki Ryoho Gakkai.

After Mikao Usui's death, around 1927–1928, Hayashi separated from the original group and founded the Hayashi Reiki Kenkyukai. In 1935, his institute was registered at 28 Higashi-shinano-cho, Yotsuya, Tokyo, now known as 27 Shinano-cho, Shinjuku ward, Tokyo.

Here he employed 20 Reiki practitioners who worked on ten massage tables, two practitioners per client. He actively promoted Reiki throughout Japan and held seminars to teach Reiki to a great number of people.

One of his organizers was Wasaburo Sugano, the uncle of Chiyoko Yamaguchi, the founder of Jikiden Reiki. Sugano began organizing trainings for Hayashi from around 1930 onwards. From 1935 they were held at the Sugano's residence in Daishoji, Ishiwawa prefecture.

Upon the invitation of Hawayo Takata, Hayashi visited Hawaii between October 1937 and February 1938. According to the Hawaii Hochi newspaper he taught 350 students from all races the practitioner degrees, Shoden and Okuden, while in Hawaii.

Following a trip to Hawaii between the year 1937-38 prior to the Japanese invasion on Pearl Harbor Dr. Hayashi was requested by the Japanese military to forward information regarding locations of warehouses and other key targets in Honolulu. As a Reiki teacher and healer this went against his principles and refused and committed ritual suicide (seppuku) to avoid his family from being disgraced by Japanese society. Dr. Hayashi died honourably on the 11th May 1940. [14]

Chujiro Hayashi ended his life at his villa in Atami – a hot spring resort near Mt Fuji – on May 11, 1940. He was succeeded by his wife, Chie Hayashi as the head of the Hayashi Reiki Kenkyukai, which closed its doors in the mid-1950s. Only two of his students and their successors are known to teach Reiki in public, Chiyoko Yamaguchi and Hawayo Takata.

== Circulation of Reiki in the world ==
Through Hawayo Takata Reiki spread first in the US and later all over the world. Some changes happened to the way of practicing it in this process of internationalization.

Chiyoko Yamaguchi founded the Jikiden Reiki Institute in 1999, together with her son Tadao Yamaguchi. In Jikiden Reiki the original teachings are unchanged, the course content is identical to what Chiyoko Yamaguchi and other family members learned from Chujiro Hayashi in the 1930s.

== See also ==
- Alternative medicine
- Laying on of hands
- Glossary of alternative medicine
- US National Center for Complementary and Alternative Medicine
- Timeline of Reiki history

== Bibliography ==
- Hayashi, Chujiro; Arjava Petter, Frank; Yamaguchi, Tadao (2004). The Hayashi Reiki Manual: Japanese Healing Techniques from the Founder of the Western Reiki System. Dorset, England: Lotus Press. ISBN 0-914955-75-6.
- Yamaguchi, Tadao (2007). Light on the Origins of Reiki. A handbook for Practicing the Original Reiki of Usui and Hayashi. Twin Lakes: Lotus Press. ISBN 978-0-9149-5565-8.
- Petter, Frank Arjava (2012). This is Reiki: Transformation of Body, Mind and Soul from the Origins to the Practice. Twin Lakes: Lotus Press. ISBN 978-0940985018.
- Nishina, Masaki (2014). Reiki and Japan. A Cultural View of Western and Japanese Reiki. English edition.
- Kleemann, Silke; Jayne, Amanda (2021). Women in Reiki. Lifetimes dedicated to healing in 1930s Japan and today. English edition.
