= Mikao Usui =

Developer of Reiki (1865–1926)

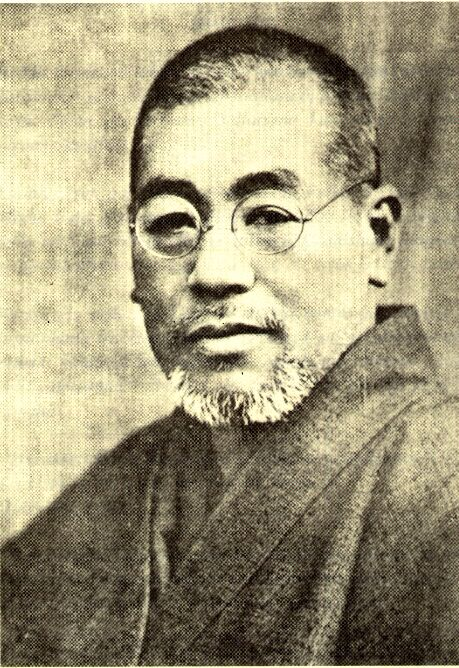
- 臼井甕男
- Born: 15 August 1865; Taniai (now called Miyama cho) (Gifu)
- Died: 9 March 1926 (aged 60); Fukuyama (福山市)
- Occupation: Reiki Master
- Known for: Reiki

Mikao Usui (臼井甕男, 15 August 1865 – 9 March 1926, commonly Usui Mikao in Japanese) is argued to have been the creator of a form of pseudoscientific spiritual practice called Reiki, a form of alternative therapy for the supposed treatment of physical, emotional, and mental diseases.

== Early life, family and education ==
Usui's memorial stone states he was born on 15 August 1865 in the village of Taniai (now called Miyam-cho) located in the Yamagata district of the Gifu Prefecture, near present-day Nagoya, Japan.

Usui's father's common name was Uzaemon. His mother being from the Kawai family. His brothers, Sanya and Kuniji, became a doctor and a policeman respectively. He also had an older sister called Tsuru. Usui's ancestors were members of the once influential Chiba clan and were Hatamoto samurai. According to the inscription on his memorial, Tsunetane Chiba, a military commander during the end of the Heian period and the start of the Kamakura period (1180–1230), was also one of Usui's ancestors. In 1551, Toshitane Chiba conquered the city Usui and thereafter all family members acquired that name.

Although there are many stories suggesting Usui earned a doctorate of theology at the theological seminary of the University of Chicago, there is no proof he ever attended, let alone received any degree from the University of Chicago.

It has also been claimed that Usui travelled to several Western countries, as well as to China as a part of his studies which supposedly included history, medicine, Buddhism, Christianity, psychology, and Taoism.

== Career and activities ==
Usui's professional teachings aimed to provide a method for students to achieve connection with a "universal life force" energy to help them in their self-development. Students of Usui received 'five principles' to live by and those with a further interest in the teachings became dedicated practitioners of Reiki. Individuals supposedly visited Usui for different purposes such as healing and spiritual teachings.

Usui's spiritual teachings are thought by some to have been an amended form of Shugendō, a Japanese mountain ascetic shamanistic practice which incorporates Shinto and Buddhist rituals. The roles of Shugendō practitioners include offering religious services, fortune telling, divination, channelling, prayer, ritual incantations and exorcism.

According to the inscription on his memorial stone, Usui taught Reiki to over 2,000 people during his lifetime.

=== Claims of Reiki's Christian origins ===
Hawayo Takata, a Reiki Master under the tutelage of Chujiro Hayashi (林 忠次郎, 1880–1940), allegedly added Christian themes into Reiki's history of development to make Reiki more appealing to the West; to this end, she allegedly linked Reiki to Jesus Christ alongside Buddhism. As time went by, also a rumour circulated that she falsely presented Usui as the dean of a Christian school, while he had obtained the knowledge of Reiki from Buddhist roots, and Takata claimed that he had been inspired from the story of Jesus Christ, who had healed with the touch of his hand – she would have said this to spread Reiki among Christians too, believing it would otherwise be extinct.

It is argued by some that Reiki originated from Buddhism, however this is claim is debated by both independent scholars and Reiki practitioners..

=== Activity in the 1920s ===
During the early 1920s, Usui did a 21-day prayer and fasting practice on Mount Kurama. Common belief dictates that it was during these 21 days that Usui developed Reiki.

In April of the 11th year of Taisho (1922 A.D.) he settled in Harajuku, Aoyama, Tokyo and set up the Gakkai to teach Reiki Ryoho and give treatments. Even outside of the building it was full of pairs of shoes of the visitors who had come from far and near.

— Usui Memorial Stone

In September of the 12th year (1923 A.D.) there was a great earthquake and a conflagration broke out. Everywhere there were groans of pains from the wounded. Sensei, feeling pity for them, went out every morning to go around the town, and he cured and saved an innumerable number of people.

— Usui Memorial Stone

== Personal life and death ==
Usui married Sadako Suzuki, who bore children by the names of Fuji and Toshiko. Fuji (1908–1946) became a teacher at Tokyo University. Toshiko died at age 22 in 1935.

While traveling to Fukuyama to teach, he suffered a stroke and died on March 9, 1926. His grave is at Saihoji Temple, in Suginami, Tokyo.

The family's ashes are buried at the grave site at the Saihō-ji Temple in Tokyo.

== See also ==
- Glossary of alternative medicine
- Laying on of hands
