= Robert Baratz =

American dentist and campaigner against health fraud

Robert Sears Baratz
- Other name: Robert S. Baratz
- Education: Northwestern University
- Spouse: Yes
- Children: Two
- Awards: 1992 Presidential Citation from the American Dental Association, 1993 Good Neighbor award from Newton, Massachusetts
- Scientific career
- Fields: Dentistry, Medicine
- Workplaces: South Shore Health Center
- Thesis: Development of the rat dorsal lingual keratinizing epithelium: morphology and protein biochemistry (1975)

Robert Sears Baratz is an American dentist and skeptic who practices in Braintree, Massachusetts. Baratz has practiced dentistry since 1972 and emergency medicine since 1991. He was formerly the executive director of the National Council Against Health Fraud (NCAHF).

== Education and academic career ==
Baratz holds three doctorates (M.D., D.D.S., and Ph.D.). He is board certified in oral medicine, and completed his residency in internal medicine at the Carney Hospital. He received his PhD from Northwestern University in 1975. As of 2002, he was a faculty member at Northeastern University, as well as at Boston University School of Medicine, where he has been a faculty member since 1976.

== Views ==
Baratz has harshly criticized spending money on researching alternative medicine. Baratz has also criticized the use of the Heimlich Maneuver on drowning victims, which he has referred to as "human experimentation" and which he says "violates the basic rules of medical ethics," as well as insulin potentiation therapy. In addition, Baratz, along with the American Dental Association (for which he is a spokesperson), believes dental amalgams to be safe and their alleged adverse health effects unproven.

Baratz has also voiced opposition to chiropractic, and appeared in an episode of Frontline called "A Different Way to Heal?" which questioned the scientific foundation of alternative medicine. In the episode, he said that "The chiropractic theory of manipulation as being curative of disease or in terms of diagnosing disease, is based on a false premise." The episode was harshly criticized by Daryl Wills, then-president of the American Chiropractic Association, who wrote in a letter to PBS that he "found it ironic that a program titled "Scientific American Frontiers" would completely ignore the scientific foundation of the chiropractic profession" and also questioned the NCAHF's neutrality with regard to alternative medicine-related topics. In reply, Baratz posted a response on the NCAHF's website in which he argued that "The fact that one does research on chiropractic does not make it "evidence-based." One can research scams and collect statistics on them. They are still scams." Baratz is also a scientific advisor to the American Council on Science and Health, and co-authored the book Consumer Health: A Guide to Intelligent Decisions along with Stephen Barrett, Harriet Hall, William London, and Manfred Kroger.

In 2006, Baratz filed a complaint about Victoria Wulsin's endorsement of malariotherapy as a treatment for AIDS to the State Medical Board of Ohio; As of 2008 the complaint had been closed. In 2009, Baratz teamed up with Kimball Atwood, Wallace Sampson and Elizabeth Woeckner to write an article in the Medscape Journal of Medicine which harshly criticized the use of chelation therapy as an alternative medical treatment.

== Selected publications ==
- Baratz, R. S.; Farbman, A. I. (1975). "Morphogenesis of rat lingual filiform papillae". American Journal of Anatomy. 143 (3): 283–30. doi:10.1002/aja.1001430303. PMID 1155358.
- Kousvelari, E. E.; Baratz, R. S.; Burke, B.; Oppenheim, F. G. (1980). "Immunochemical identification and determination of proline-rich proteins in salivary secretions, enamel pellicle, and glandular tissue specimens". Journal of Dental Research. 59 (8): 1430–1438. doi:10.1177/00220345800590081201. PMID 6772700. S2CID 209326449.
- Neubauer, L.; Baratz, R. S.; Laing, R. A.; Oak, S. S.; Leibowitz, H. M. (1984). "Coalescence of Endothelial Cells in the Traumatized Cornea: III. Correlation Between Specular and Scanning Electron Microscopy". Archives of Ophthalmology. 102 (6): 921–922. doi:10.1001/archopht.1984.01040030741034. PMID 6732577.
