= Stephen Barrett =

American psychiatrist (born 1933)

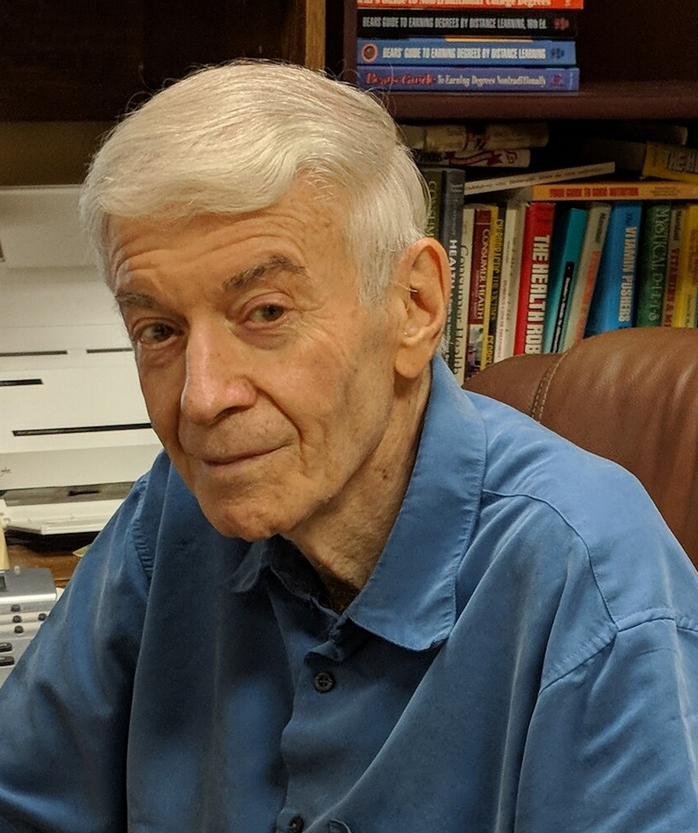
- Born: Stephen Joel Barrett; 1933 (age 92–93); New York City, U.S.
- Education: Columbia University
- Occupations: Psychiatrist, author, consumer advocate, webmaster
- Years active: 1961–1993 (psychiatry)
- Known for: Being the webmaster of Quackwatch
- Spouse: Judith Nevyas Barrett
- Children: 3
- Website: QuackWatch.org

Stephen Joel Barrett (/ˈbærɪt/; born 1933) is an American retired psychiatrist, author, and consumer advocate best known for his work combatting health fraud and promoting evidence-based medicine. He founded Quackwatch, a network of websites that critiques unproven or questionable medical practices, and co-founded the National Council Against Health Fraud. A longtime critic of pseudoscience and alternative medicine, Barrett has written extensively on medical misinformation and served as an advisor to several scientific and health advocacy organizations. His work has earned him both praise from scientific communities and criticism from proponents of alternative health practices.

== Early life and education ==
Barrett was born in New York City. He is a 1957 graduate of the Columbia University College of Physicians and Surgeons and completed his psychiatry residency in 1961. In 1968, he completed part of a correspondence course in American Law and Procedure at La Salle Extension University in Chicago.

== Career ==
A longtime resident of Allentown, Pennsylvania, Barrett now resides in Chapel Hill, North Carolina.

In addition to webmastering his websites, Barrett was a co-founder, vice-president and a board member of the National Council Against Health Fraud (NCAHF). He is a scientific advisor to the American Council on Science and Health, and a fellow of the Committee for Skeptical Inquiry (CSI). From 1987 through 1989, he taught health education at Pennsylvania State University.

Barrett was the consulting editor for the Consumer Health Library at Prometheus Books, and has been a peer-review panelist for two medical journals. He has also served on the editorial board of Medscape and the Scientific Review of Alternative Medicine. According to his website, he "has written more than 2,000 articles and delivered more than 300 talks at colleges, universities, medical schools, and professional meetings. His media appearances include Dateline, Today, Good Morning America, Primetime, Donahue, CNN, National Public Radio, and more than 200 other radio and television talk show interviews."

Quackwatch received the award of Best Physician-Authored Site by MD NetGuide, May 2003. In 1984, he received an FDA Commissioner's Special Citation Award for Public Service in fighting nutrition quackery. He was included in the list of outstanding skeptics of the 20th century by Skeptical Inquirer magazine. In 1986, he was awarded honorary membership in the American Dietetic Association. Barrett has been profiled in Biography Magazine (1998) and in Time (2001).

The magazine Spiked included Barrett in a survey of 134 persons they termed "key thinkers in science, technology and medicine."

=== Quackwatch ===
In 1996, Barrett launched Quackwatch, a website aimed at investigating health-related frauds, myths, fads, fallacies, and misconceptions. Initially operated under the nonprofit Quackwatch, Inc., the organization was dissolved in 2008. In 2020, the website became part of the Center for Inquiry, which now maintains its content.

Barrett defines quackery as "anything involving overpromotion in the field of health," reserving the term "fraud" for instances involving deliberate deception. The site includes contributions from scientific, technical, and lay volunteers, with numerous references to published research articles.

Barrett has been a vocal critic of alternative medicine practices, including chiropractic, homeopathy, and acupuncture. He has stated that he does not aim to provide balanced coverage on these topics, asserting that "quackery and fraud don't involve legitimate controversy and are not balanced subjects." This stance has led to criticism from proponents of alternative medicine, who argue that his approach lacks objectivity.

Despite the criticism, Quackwatch has been cited by various media outlets, academic journals, and professional organizations as a resource for information on questionable health practices. Some authors have described the site as overly biased in its presentation.

== Publications ==
Barrett's (co)authored or (co)edited books include:

- Vitamins and Minerals: Help or Harm?, Marshall CW (1983). Lippincott Williams & Wilkins ISBN 0-397-53060-9 (edited by Barrett, won the American Medical Writers Association award for best book of 1983 for the general public, republished by Consumer Reports Books).
- Health Schemes, Scams, and Frauds, Barrett SJ (1991). Consumer Reports Books, ISBN 0-89043-330-5
- The Vitamin Pushers: How the "Health Food" Industry Is Selling America a Bill of Goods, Barrett SJ, Herbert V (1991). Prometheus Books, ISBN 0-87975-909-7
- The Health Robbers: A Close Look at Quackery in America, Barrett SJ, Jarvis WT, eds. (1993). Prometheus Books, ISBN 0-87975-855-4
- Reader's Guide to Alternative Health Methods, Zwicky JF, Hafner AW, Barrett S, Jarvis WT (1993). American Medical Association, ISBN 0-89970-525-1
- Chemical Sensitivity: The Truth About Environmental Illness (Consumer Health Library), Barrett, SJ & Gots, Ronald E. (1998). Prometheus Books. ISBN 9781573921954
- Dubious Cancer Treatment, Barrett SJ & Cassileth BR, editors (2001). Florida Division of the American Cancer Society
- Consumer Health: A Guide to Intelligent Decisions, Barrett S, London W, Kroger M, Hall H, Baratz R (2013). (textbook, 9th ed.) McGraw-Hill, ISBN 978-0078028489

Collections of articles:

- Paranormal Claims: A Critical Analysis, 2007, edited by Bryan Farha, University Press of America, ISBN 978-0-7618-3772-5. Three of the eighteen chapters are written by Barrett.

Barrett's articles include:

- In 1985, Barrett was the author of the "Commercial hair analysis. Science or scam?" article in the Journal of the American Medical Association that exposed commercial laboratories performing multimineral hair analysis. He commented that in his opinion, "commercial use of hair analysis in this manner is unscientific, economically wasteful, and probably illegal." His report has been cited in later articles, including one which concluded that such testing was "unreliable."
- "A Close Look at Therapeutic Touch", Rosa L, Rosa E, Sarner L, Barrett SJ. (April 1, 1998). JAMA, Vol. 279, No. 13, pp 1005–1010.

== See also ==
- Barrett v. Rosenthal
- Consumer protection
- Debunker
- Evidence-based medicine
- Pseudoscience
