= Liquid oxygen supplement =

Products that claim to add extra oxygen to the human body

Liquid oxygen supplements are products that claim to add extra oxygen to the human body, most often through a chemical process in the digestive system, like the breakdown of hydrogen peroxide or magnesium peroxide. While the FDA describes these products as being inert, and has penalized some producers who made explicit medical claims, it has not prohibited their sale.

== Liquid oxygen ==
Liquid oxygen is the name of a product that is a solution of hydrogen peroxide and other compounds including sodium chloride (common salt) that claims to help with "jet lag, fatigue, altitude sickness, headaches, hangovers, youthful skin, energy, and insomnia".

Professor Ken Harvey, a member of the World Health Organization team that formulated criteria for the promotion of medicinal drugs and a member of Auspharm Consumer Health Watch, states that the product is "no more than salty water", and that most forms of water carry some dissolved oxygen. The Federal Trade Commission has prosecuted some makers of such products for making "blatantly false and unsubstantiated health claims", although it has not banned the sale of such products.

The product claims to have an effect through increasing the amount of oxygen in the body but this is unnecessary as oxygen is absorbed by the lungs via breathing. Among the ingredients sometimes listed by makers are magnesium peroxide, or "deionized water and sodium chloride [salt]". It cannot contain simple liquid oxygen, which would boil at −183 °C (−297.4 °F; 90.1 K) at normal pressure, but ostensibly contains oxygen in some other form, like hydrogen peroxide, that will be released after consumption.

== Vitamin O ==
Vitamin O is a dietary supplement marketed and sold by Rose Creek Health Products and its sister company The Staff of Life (doing business as R-Garden) since 1998. Despite its name, the product is not recognized by nutritional science as a vitamin. In 1999, the Federal Trade Commission fined the manufacturer for making false statements claiming health benefits resulting from the use of the product. The manufacturer had claimed that taking the supplement had beneficial effects on a wide variety of ailments, including angina, anaemia, and various forms of cancer, and that it also increased vigor and provided for a more positive state of mind. The company states that Vitamin O is "a special supplemented oxygen taken in liquid form and produced through electrical-activation with a saline solution from the ocean," and that the substance increases the amount of oxygen present in the blood.

While Rose Creek Health Products complied with the Dietary Supplement Health and Education Act of 1994 in that the product was sold without approval by the Food and Drug Administration because no claims about its medical efficacy were made by its producers, Rose Creek collected statements from users who attributed wide-ranging benefits to taking their supplement. However, subsequent ads also ran statements allegedly coming from experts and which provided anecdotal evidence from small-scale clinical trials showing positive results in several patients. Because of this, the Federal Trade Commission filed an injunction in March 1999 against Rose Creek Health Products Inc., stating that the ads being run in both print and online sources, including USA Today, were "blatantly false". Studies run on Vitamin O showed it to be composed largely of salt water as well as a small quantity of germanium, which would provide no benefits not attributable to the placebo effect.

On April 28, 2000, Rose Creek Health Products Inc., agreed to pay a cash settlement of $375,000 for consumer redress, and to abstain from making claims as to the health benefits attributed to the supplement, or promoting its efficacy in treating illnesses. However, in 2005, the Food and Drug Administration issued a warning letter to R-Garden, indicating that its product labeling, website, and literature that the company distributed with shipped product were promoting Vitamin O as drugs — i.e., agents intended for use in the cure, mitigation, treatment or prevention of disease. These included testimonial claims that a person unable to walk because of congestive heart failure had been able to walk again and ceased taking "heart pills or pain pills" after a three-month course of the product, and that another was able to breathe very easily again despite chronic obstructive pulmonary disease and repeated prior bouts of chronic bronchitis and pneumonia thanks to the product. As of 2010, the product contains a disclaimer stating "This product is not intended to diagnose, treat, cure or prevent any disease".
