= William T. Jarvis =

American health educator and skeptic (1935–2016)

William Tyler Jarvis (October 19, 1935 – March 1, 2016) was an American health educator and skeptic.

== Biography ==
Jarvis graduated from University of Minnesota, University of Minnesota Duluth and Kent State University. In 1973, he obtained a PhD in health education from the University of Oregon. He was professor of preventive medicine at Loma Linda University.

In 1976, Jarvis cofounded the National Council Against Health Fraud and was president from 1977 until his retirement in 2000. He was an adviser to the American Council on Science and Health. He was a noted critic of alternative medicine and was known for exposing quackery. He described chiropractic as "the most significant nonscientific health-care delivery system in the United States."

Jarvis was a scientific consultant for the Committee for Skeptical Inquiry and a charter member of the Council for Scientific Medicine.

== Publications ==
- Quackery and You (1983)
- Food: Facts and Fallacies from A-Z (1985)
- The Health Robbers: A Close Look at Quackery in America (1993) [with Stephen Barrett]
- Consumer Health: A Guide to Intelligent Decisions with PowerWeb: Health and Human Performance (2001) [with Stephen Barrett]
