= Hair analysis (alternative medicine) =

Analysis of hair to assist alternative diagnosis

Alternative therapy

In mainstream scientific usage, hair analysis is the chemical analysis of a hair sample. The use of hair analysis in alternative medicine as a method of investigation to assist alternative diagnosis is controversial and its use in this manner has been opposed repeatedly by the AMA because of its unproven status and its potential for healthcare fraud.

== Background ==
In hair analysis, the levels of minerals and metals in the hair sample are analyzed. Alternative medicine advocates state that this allows them to diagnose mineral deficiencies, heavy metal poisoning, and that autistic people have anomalous hair test results.

As of 1998, of the nine commercial 'nutritional hair analysis' laboratories operating in the United States, three indicated that they primarily used ICP-MS, four primarily used ICP-AES, and one reported use of directly coupled plasma (DCP)-AES. DCP-AES is an older technique that is potentially less stable than ICP-AES. On average, these laboratories measure 26 elements per hair sample. Nutritional hair analysis laboratories require between 0.3 and 1 gram for the AES methods, and 0.25-1 gram for ICP-MS." The amount selected depends on the analytical method used, but sample sizes in the 50 milligram range are reported.

== Inconsistent results ==
In 1983, a New York Times article criticized the industry for inconsistent results, fraudulent practices, unscientific aspects, and being "a consumer ripoff that in some cases is dangerous".

In 1984, the FTC successfully obtained an injunction to stop a hair analysis laboratory's false claims to the public, on the basis that it was "inaccurate, worthless to consumers and possibly harmful because it might prevent patients from seeking proper medical attention".

In a 1985 investigation of 13 commercial laboratories published in the Journal of the American Medical Association noted inconsistencies and questionable content in their reports and recommendations:

Hair samples from two healthy teenagers were sent under assumed names to 13 commercial laboratories performing multimineral hair analysis. The reported levels of most minerals varied considerably between identical samples sent to the same laboratory and from laboratory to laboratory. The laboratories also disagreed about what was "normal" or "usual" for many of the minerals. Most reports contained computerized interpretations that were voluminous, bizarre, and potentially frightening to patients. Six laboratories recommended food supplements, but the types and amounts varied widely from report to report and from laboratory to laboratory. Literature from most of the laboratories suggested that their reports were useful in managing a wide variety of diseases and supposed nutrient imbalances. However, commercial use of hair analysis in this manner is unscientific, economically wasteful, and probably illegal.

The author did not explicitly rule out further diagnostic uses for hair mineral analyses in the future, but listed three issues that prevent hair mineral tests provided by the sampled labs from being accepted as scientifically sound and clinically viable: a lack of standardization and general agreement on the techniques by which hair mineral content was to be determined, a lack of consensus on the meaning of hair mineral content analyses, and a lack of agreement on treatments for putative imbalances.

The labs suggested a variety of 'abnormal conditions' were indicated by the hair samples, none of which were present. These varied between samples from the same test subjects.

In 2001, a follow-up investigation was conducted to see if things had improved since the 1985 investigation. The authors concluded:

Hair mineral analysis from these laboratories was unreliable, and we recommend that health care practitioners refrain from using such analyses to assess individual nutritional status or suspected environmental exposures. Problems with the regulation and certification of these laboratories also should be addressed.

Tests have shown that levels of heavy metal in the body may not be reflected by the levels in the hair.

The American Medical Association has stated and restated twice in the last two decades their position: "The AMA opposes chemical analysis of the hair as a determinant of the need for medical therapy and supports informing the American public and appropriate governmental agencies of this unproven practice and its potential for health care fraud."

In 2011, a comprehensive review of the scientific literature on hair elemental (mineral) analysis, the most up-to-date resource on the current status, was published. Concerning commercial practices offering services to individuals, assuming analysis is conducted correctly and compared to a suitable control population (which generally is not the case), it concluded: "offering a diagnosis as to the cause of an abnormal concentration is currently not feasible and is difficult to see as realistic".
