= National Council Against Health Fraud =

Former American consumer advocate organization

- Formation: 1983
- Founder: William T. Jarvis
- Dissolved: 2011
- Type: Network of people
- Location: United States
- Official language: English
- Website: www.ncahf.org

The National Council Against Health Fraud (NCAHF) was a not-for-profit, US-based organization, that described itself as a "private nonprofit, voluntary health agency that focuses upon health misinformation, fraud, and quackery as public health problems."

== History ==
According to archived website, the NCAHF evolved from three separate organizations. The Lehigh Valley Committee Against Health Fraud, Inc. (LVCAHF, now called Quackwatch) was founded in 1969 by Stephen Barrett and H. William Gross, D.D.S. in Allentown, Pennsylvania. The Southern California Council Against Health Fraud (SCCAHF) had its origin in 1976 at Loma Linda University with academic colleagues William T. Jarvis and Gordon Rick as co-founders. Thomas H. Jukes of University of California, Berkeley founded the third organization, an unnamed group in northern California.

For a time between 1998 and 2000, the NCAHF operated under the name National Council for Reliable Health Information (NCRHI). The organization became inactive in 2002, and its legal entity was formally dissolved in 2011.

== Position on health issues ==
=== Acupuncture ===
The NCAHF asserted that acupuncture is scientifically unproven as a modality of treatment. In 1990, it said that research during the past twenty years had failed to demonstrate that acupuncture was effective against any disease. Perceived effects of acupuncture are, argued the NCAHF, probably due to a combination of expectation, suggestion and other psychological mechanisms. The NCAHF pointed out that acupuncture was banned in China in 1929 but underwent a resurgence in the 1960s. The organization also advocated that insurance companies should not be required to cover acupuncture treatment and that licensure of lay acupuncturists should be phased out.

=== Amalgam fillings ===
There has been some controversy regarding the use of amalgam fillings by dentists, because the amalgam contains mercury. Some forms of mercury are toxic to humans, but the NCAHF cites the CDC in stating that there is no evidence that "the health of the vast majority of people with amalgam is compromised" or that "removing amalgam fillings has a beneficial effect on health". The NCAHF criticizes those who they believe exploit unfounded public fears for financial gain. NCAHF asserts that breath, urine and blood testing for mercury are inaccurate. Other tests for mercury exposure described by the NCAHF as invalid can include skin testing, stool testing, hair analysis and electrodermal testing.

=== Chiropractic ===
The NCAHF contended that chiropractic can be dangerous and lead to injury or permanent disability. However, the NCAHF did not categorically oppose the practice. It differentiated between chiropractors who promote what it considered good and bad chiropractic practices. The former promote methods of diagnosis and treatment which have a scientific basis. For example, NCAHF claims there is no scientific support for vertebral subluxation. Their view is that chiropractors should restrict their scope of practice to neuromusculoskeletal problems such as muscle spasms, strains, sprains, fatigue, imbalance of strength and flexibility, stretched or irritated nerve tissue, and so forth. Chiropractors should refer cases involving pathology to qualified medical practitioners.

In contrast, what the NCAHF considered bad are those chiropractors who believe the spinal adjustment will cure or alleviate a variety of diseases, such as infection, arthritis, cancer, diabetes, nutritional deficiencies or excesses, appendicitis, blood disorders, or kidney disease. These practitioners may use unproven, disproven, or questionable methods, devices, and products such as adjusting machines, applied kinesiology, chelation therapy, colonic irrigation, computerized nutrition deficiency tests, cranial osteopathy, cytotoxic food allergy testing, DMSO, Gerovital, glandular therapy, hair analysis, herbal crystallization analyses, homeopathy, internal managements, iridology, laser beam acupuncture, laetrile, magnetic therapy, and so forth.

=== Diet advice ===
The NCAHF was opposed to dietary recommendations and practices not supported by scientific evidence, including behavior-related claims. Unverified assessment methods such as iridology, applied kinesiology, and routine hair analysis for assessment of nutritional status are criticized. NCAHF and some of its members have long opposed implementation of beliefs that they characterize as unfounded or unscientific.

NCAHF also questioned the health claims, marketing, safety, efficacy and labeling of many herbal supplements. Herbal preparations are regulated as foods, rather than as drugs, in the United States. The NCAHF advocates regulations for a special OTC category called "Traditional Herbal Remedies" (THRs) with an adverse reaction surveillance program, product batches marked for identification and tracking, package label warnings about proposed dangers of self-treatment, oversight requirements from outside of the herbal industry, and strong penalties for unapproved changes in herbal product formulations.

=== Diploma mills ===
The NCAHF asserted that many unqualified practitioners are able to mislead the public by using diploma mills or "degree mills" to get "specious degrees". Diploma mills are not accredited, and frequently engage in "pseudoscience and food faddism". NCAHF also noted that "some of the 'faculty' or 'academic' advisors at several of these schools have criminal convictions in the area of health fraud". NCAHF considers diploma mills harmful to the students and to the public.

== Usefulness as a source ==
The National Council Against Health Fraud was mentioned as a useful source for information by the United States Department of Agriculture, the 2003 edition of "Cancer Medicine", published by the American Cancer Society, and many other organizations and libraries.

The journal Dynamic Chiropractic, while highly critical of NCAHFs views on chiropractic, has written: "The National Council Against Health Fraud is considered a valuable information source for many agencies nationwide. They are well networked and, as demonstrated by their past history, are able to influence the efforts of various agencies and insurance carriers. The NCAHF's ability to publish its opinions and hold these types of conferences does make them a substantial "player" in the area of health fraud."

In 1998, the AMA's Council on Scientific Affairs used NCAHF board member John Renner as a contributing source for some of the content in their "Report 12."

== Criticism from alternative medicine supporters ==
The American Chiropractic Association (ACA) criticised a 2002 PBS broadcast which included an episode about chiropractic in which the NCAHF was involved. ACA president Daryl D. Wills responded to PBS officials stating (in part): "I find it ironic that a program titled 'Scientific American Frontiers' would completely ignore the scientific foundation of the chiropractic profession. The chiropractic portion of the June 4 episode titled 'A Different Way to Heal?' irresponsibly characterized chiropractic care -- a legitimate, research-based form of health care -- as a fraudulent hoax." and that "[t]he producers of your program could not have expected objectivity" from the NCAHF. The producer of the program replied in detail and explicitly denied these allegations: "The segment did not claim that chiropractic is fraudulent and did not attempt to prove or disprove that chiropractic 'works,' but it does state that chiropractic has no basis in science. This conclusion is entirely justified by both current research and generally accepted views of human anatomy."

== See also ==
- Evidence-based medicine
- Medical ethics
- Scientific skepticism
