= Lindstrom (disambiguation) =

Lindstrom is a surname.

Lindstrom may also refer to:

== Places ==
- Lindstrom, Minnesota, United States
- Lindstrøm Peak, in the Queen Maud Mountains, Antarctica
- Lindstrom Peninsula, Ellesmere Island, Nunavut, Canada
- Lindstrom Ridge, in the Darwin Mountains, Antarctica
- 5281 Lindstrom, a minor planet

== Other uses ==
- Lindström (company), a multinational textile services company
- Carl Lindström Company, a global record company
- Lindström quantifier, a family of sets in mathematical logic
- Lindström's theorem, a mathematical result concerning first-order logic
- Lindstrom Field, a sport stadium in Lindsborg, Kansas, United States
- Lindstrom House, a residence in Bainbridge Island, Washington, United States
