= Strom =

Strom may refer to:

== Astronomy ==
- 8408 Strom (1995 SX12), a main-belt asteroid discovered on September 18, 1995 by Spacewatch at Kitt Peak

== Geography ==
- Strom, Virginia, an unincorporated community in Botetourt County, Virginia, United States
- Strom (Ucker), a river of Brandenburg, Germany
- Strom Glacier, a steep valley glacier flowing from the north side of Mount Fridtjof Nansen to the head of the Ross Ice Shelf
- Strom Lake, a lake in Minnesota

== Surname ==
- Ström (surname)
- Strøm, a surname

== People ==
- Strom Peterson (born 1967 or 1968), American politician serving in the Washington State House of Representatives
- Allen Axel Strom (c.1914–1997), Australian environmental educator and naturalist
- Brent Strom (born 1948), a former baseball player who played as a pitcher in Major League Baseball
- Brock Strom (born 1934), a former American football player
- David M. Strom (born 1957), American experimental particle physicist at the University of Oregon
- David Strom (born 1964), Research Director at the Emmer for Governor Campaign
- Earl Strom (1927–1994), American professional basketball referee
- Harry Strom (1914–1984), the ninth Premier of Alberta, Canada, from 1968 to 1971
- Jeff Strom, a footballer who represented New Zealand at international level
- Karl Morin-Strom (born 1952), a former politician in Ontario, Canada
- Kevin Alfred Strom (born 1956), American white nationalist activist
- Lyle Elmer Strom (1925–2023), a United States federal judge
- Mark Strom (born 1982), a Mexican American professional basketball player
- Rick Strom (American football) (born 1965), former American football player who played as a quarterback in the NFL
- Rick Strom (music producer), American music producer
- Stephanie Strom, American journalist, correspondent for The New York Times
- Virginia Strom-Martin (born 1948), American politician, served in the California state Assembly
- Yale Strom, American Klezmer violinist, amateur ethnomusicologist, documentarist, and writer
- Strom Thurmond (1902–2003), American politician

== Companies ==
- Strom Products, an American food manufacturer in Bannockburn, Illinois
- Verlag Der Strom, Christian publishing company located in Stuttgart, Germany

== Music ==
- "Strom" (song), song by Die Toten Hosen from the album In aller Stille

== Other ==
- Ström Vodka, brand of vodka

== See also ==
- Die Stadt hinter dem Strom, a German language existentialist novel by Hermann Kasack, published in 1947 in Berlin
- Die Stadt hinter dem Strom (opera), an oratorio-opera in three acts composed by Hans Vogt
- Ein Strom fließt durch Deutschland, an East German film
- J. Strom Thurmond Dam, a concrete-gravity and embankment dam at the border of South Carolina and Georgia, creating Lake Strom Thurmond
- Lake Strom Thurmond, a reservoir at the border between Georgia and South Carolina in the Savannah River Basin
- Suzuki V-Strom 1000, a dual-sport motorcycle with a 996 cc V-twin engine and a standard riding posture
- Suzuki V-Strom 650, a mid-weight, dual-sport motorcycle with a standard riding posture, fuel injection and an aluminum chassis
- Storm (disambiguation)
