= Lindström =

- Pronunciation: Swedish:

Origin
- Language: Swedish
- Meaning: ornamental name composed of the elements lind (lime tree) and ström (river)
- Region of origin: Sweden, Norway, Denmark

Other names
- Variant form: Lindstrøm

Lindström or Lindstrøm is a Scandinavian surname used in the Swedish, Danish and Norwegian languages. In English-speaking countries, the name is commonly spelled as Lindstrom. Notable people with the surname include:

- Adolf Lindstrøm (1866–1939), Norwegian chef and polar explorer
- Alec Lindstrom (born 1998), American football player
- Anders Lindström (born 1969), Swedish guitarist and pianist
- Anders Lindström (born 1955), Swedish Army officer
- Bengt Lindström (1925–2008), Swedish painter
- Bjarne Lindstrøm (born 1942), Norwegian diplomat
- Brian Lindstrom (1961–2026), American documentary filmmaker
- Chris Lindstrom (born 1997), American football player
- Claës Lindsström (1876–1964), Swedish vice admiral
- Curt Lindström (born 1940), Swedish ice hockey coach
- Daniel Lindström (born 1978), Swedish pop singer
- Ernest W. Lindstrom (1891–1948), American genetics professor
- Freddie Lindstrom (1905–1981), American baseball player
- Fredrik Lindström (writer) (born 1963), Swedish linguist, comedian, film director and presenter
- Gunnar Lindström (1896–1951), Swedish athlete
- Gustaf Lindström (1829–1901), Swedish paleontologist
- Gustav Lindström (born 1998), Swedish ice hockey player
- Hans-Peter Lindstrøm (born 1973), Norwegian electronic musician, commonly referred to mononymously as Lindstrøm
- Jesper Lindstrøm (born 2000), Danish footballer
- Joakim Lindström (born 1983), Swedish ice hockey player
- Jörgen Lindström (born 1951), Swedish actor
- Liam Lindström (born 1985), Canadian ice hockey player
- Linde Lindström (Mikko Viljami Lindström, born 1976), Finnish lead guitarist of the band HIM
- Lise Lindstrom, American operatic soprano
- Marika Lindström (born 1946), Swedish actress
- Martin Lindstrom, Danish branding expert and author
- Matt Lindstrom (born 1980), American baseball player
- Mattias Lindström (footballer) (born 1980), Swedish professional football (soccer) player
- Mattias Lindström (ice hockey) (born 1991), Swedish ice hockey player
- Maurits Lindström (1932–2009), Swedish geologist and paleontologist, specialist of prehistoric fish
- Mikael Lindström (born 1944), Swedish diplomat
- Morgan Lindstrøm (born 1956), Norwegian musician and composer
- Pär Lindström (born 1970), Swedish freestyle swimmer
- Per Lindström (1936–2009), Swedish logician
- Pia Lindström (born 1938), American television anchor
- Rikard Lindström (1882–1943), Swedish painter
- Rune Lindstrøm (born 1963), Norwegian musician
- Shane Lindstrom (born 1994), American record producer known professionally as Murda Beatz
- Torsten Lindström (born 1974), Swedish politician
- Tuija Lindström (1950–2017), Finnish-Swedish photographer
- Ulla Lindström (1909–1999), Swedish politician
- Veli-Matti Lindström (born 1983), Finnish ski jumper
- Willy Lindström (born 1951), Swedish former ice hockey player

== Fictional characters ==
- Bess Lindstrom, fictional character on The Mary Tyler Moore Show
- Helen Lindstrom, fictional character in the Venturer Twelve Science Fiction series
- Lars Lindstrom, main character in the film Lars and the Real Girl
- Natalie Lindstrom, fictional character in Stephen Woodworth novels
- Phyllis Lindstrom, fictional character on The Mary Tyler Moore Show and Phyllis
- Rose Nylund (née Lindström), main character in The Golden Girls

== See also ==
- Ström (surname), Swedish surname
- Strøm, Norwegian and Danish surname
