= Ferruccio Ritossa =

Italian geneticist (1936–2014)

- Born: February 25, 1936; Pinguente, Istria
- Died: January 9, 2014 (aged 77)
- Known for: Discovery of the heat shock response
- Scientific career
- Fields: Genetics, molecular biology
- Institutions: Istituto di Genetica e Biofisica, University of Bari, University of Bologna

Ferruccio Ritossa (February 25, 1936 – January 9, 2014) was an Italian geneticist best known for his discovery of the heat shock response in the model organism Drosophila (fruit flies).

== Early life and education ==
Ritossa was born in the town of Pinguente in Istria in 1936, one of three sons. His father, a butcher, was killed in the foibe killings when Ritossa was a young child. His mother moved the family to Italy and taught school in an orphanage, where her three children were also educated. Ritossa attended the University of Bologna to study agricultural sciences and graduated in 1958. He became interested in genetics, particularly in then-emerging molecular studies of the field, and joined a newly established course in biophysics taught by Adriano Buzzati-Traverso at the University of Pavia, where Buzzati-Traverso had begun to establish Drosophila research and collections. Buzzati-Traverso founded a laboratory, now the Istituto di Genetica e Biofisica, in Naples and invited Ritossa to join him there.

== Heat shock studies ==
Ritossa was interested in the newly emerging field of molecular genetics and began to study the polytene chromosomes found in Drosophila salivary glands. These chromosomes exhibit characteristic changes called "puffs" under certain conditions, now known to reflect activation of transcription. As Ritossa later recalled, an accidental change in the temperature of a laboratory incubator unexpectedly revealed a distinct "puffing" pattern, and in following up on this serendipitous discovery he found that RNA was reliably and rapidly produced in puffs induced by temperature, later described as "the first known environmental stress acting directly on gene activity". The paper describing these observations was reportedly rejected by the high-impact scientific journal Nature and eventually published in the journal Experientia in 1962. The paper was not initially widely cited. Its significance became more widely appreciated in the 1970s as new information emerged, particularly with the discovery of heat shock proteins reported in 1974 and the identification of heat-shock responses in other organisms, now recognized as a universal response.

== Subsequent career ==
Ritossa spent several years working in the United States, first working with Robert von Borstel at Oak Ridge National Laboratory and later with Sol Spiegelman and Kim Atwood at the University of Illinois. He returned to Italy to rejoin Buzzati-Traverso's laboratory institution in Naples and remained there till 1969, when he joined the faculty at the University of Bari. After 15 years he moved again to the University of Bologna, from which he retired in the 1990s. Although he was for some time better known for his work on nucleic acid hybridization with Spiegelman and Atwood than for heat shock, growing interest in the field recognized his contributions, including through a 1982 meeting at Cold Spring Harbor Laboratory that was the first specifically on heat shock. He was recognized with a medal by the Cell Stress Society International, which now maintains an award for early-career scientists in his honor.

== Retirement ==
After retiring from his faculty position, Ritossa moved to a farm near Dozza and became a sculptor. He died on January 9, 2014.
