= Mario Ageno =

Italian biophysicist (1915–1992)

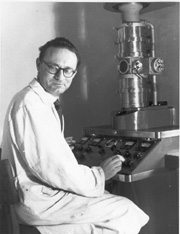
Mario Ageno

Mario Ageno (March 2, 1915 – December 23, 1992) is considered one of Italy's most important biophysicists.

== Early life and education ==
Born in Livorno from a Genoese family, he studied physics for two years in Genoa, when one of his professors noticed his talent as a scientist, and suggested that he should move to Rome. He did, and from 1934 started collaborating with the "Via Panisperna boys" on nuclear physics and cosmic rays; the former became the subject of his graduation thesis under the supervision of Enrico Fermi, in 1936. He was one of the last Italian students to study under Fermi before Fermi emigrated to the United States. In 1938 he was recruited to work with Edoardo Amaldi on the first Italian particle accelerator.

== Career ==
Aged 21, Ageno was selected to work with the "Via Panisperna boys" during their final years; when World War II broke out, he was drafted and fought in Libya. In 1949, he moved to the Physics department at the Istituto Superiore di Sanità, under the direction of Giulio Trabacchi, whom he succeeded in the position of head of department in 1959. With the collaboration of Franco Graziosi, he devoted the activities of the department to biophysics.

Thanks to his collaboration with Adriano Buzzati-Traverso, Ageno taught at the University of Pavia in 1960–1961, and became a member of the first scientific council of Traverso's Laboratorio Internazionale di Genetica e Biofisica. He left the Istituto Superiore di Sanità for the University of Rome La Sapienza in 1969, to accept the first professorship in Biophysics in Italian history. Becoming famed for his strictness with students, he continued his research in the university setting, focusing on mathematical and physical models for bacterial growth, developing a complex view on the relationships between physics and biology, which are summed up in his book Che cos'è la vita? In occasione del cinquantenario di What Is Life? di Erwin Schrödinger (Italian for "What Is life? In the occasion of the fiftieth anniversary of What Is Life? by Erwin Schrödinger). During his career, he authored about three hundred published scientific works and a handful of divulgative books, became a member of the Accademia dei Lincei, and was awarded an honorary degree in Biology.

== Retirement and death ==
Mario Ageno retired in 1985, and died suddenly on December 23, 1992. His papers (54 boxes) are held by the Physics Department of the Università di Roma "La Sapienza". There is a street named after him in Rome.

== Publications ==
- Mario Ageno (1990). "Orientamenti per una teoria della divisione cellulare - A new proposal concerning the timing of cellular division". Rendiconti Lincei. 1 (1): 73–79. doi:10.1007/BF03001751. S2CID 131467960.
- M. Ageno; A. Battistini; E. Liberati; A. M. F. Valli (1990). "Verifiche sperimentali della teoria della crescita batterica. I - Experimental tests of the theory of growth of a bacterial culture. I". Rendiconti Lincei. 1 (1): 55–62. doi:10.1007/BF03001749. S2CID 91398581.
- M. Ageno; M. Claro; A. de Blasio (1990). "Verifiche sperimentali della teoria della crescita batterica. II - Experimental tests of the theory of growth of a bacterial culture. II". Rendiconti Lincei. 1 (1): 63–71. doi:10.1007/BF03001750. S2CID 140534883.
- M. Ageno, S. Agudio e M. Benevolo (1990). "II passaggio di una coltura batterica dalla crescita aerobica a quella anaerobica I - The transition of a bacterial culture from aerobic to anaerobic growth conditions. I". Rendiconti Lincei. 1 (1): 81–89. doi:10.1007/BF03001752. S2CID 192512921.
- M. Ageno; S. Agudio; M. Benevolo; A. M. F. Valli (1990). "Il passaggio di una coltura batterica dalla crescita aerobica a quella anaerobica I - The transition of a bacterial culture from aerobic to anaerobic growth conditions. II". Rendiconti Lincei. 1 (2): 219–227. doi:10.1007/BF03001898. S2CID 130092610.
- M. Ageno, Methods and problems in biophysics. Riv. Nuovo Cim. 14, 1–71 (1991). https://doi.org/10.1007/BF02810146
