= A Dream Play =

Swedish play by August Strindberg

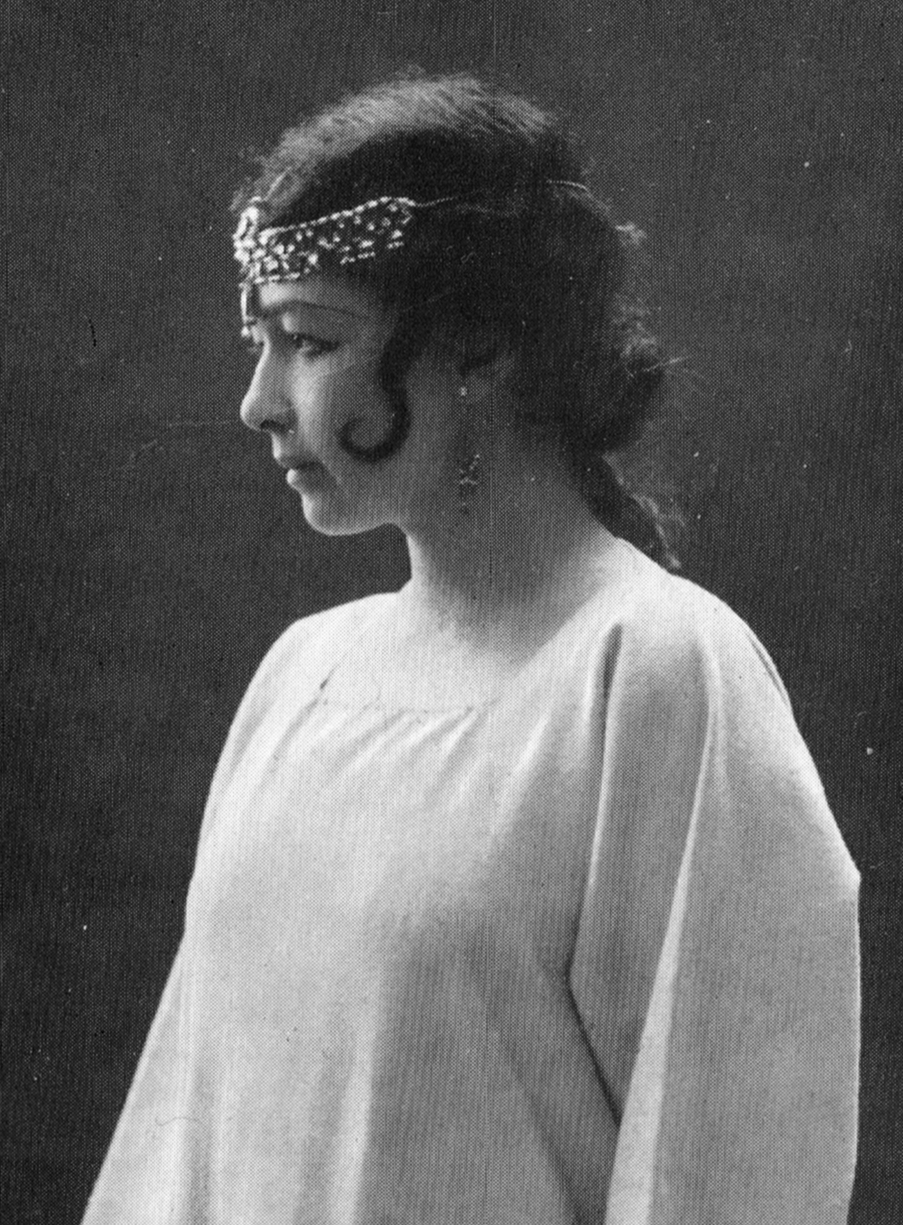
- Harriet Bosse as Indra's Daughter in the 1907 première of A Dream Play
- Original language: Swedish
- Written by: August Strindberg
- Genre: Expressionism

Premiere
- Date: 17 April 1907

A Dream Play (Swedish: Ett drömspel), sometimes staged in English as The Dream Play, is a fantasy play in 14 scenes written in 1901 by the Swedish playwright August Strindberg. It was published in Swedish in 1902 and first performed in Stockholm on 17 April 1907. It remains one of Strindberg's most admired and influential dramas, seen as an important precursor to both dramatic Expressionism and Surrealism.

== Background ==
Strindberg wrote the play in autumn 1901. Initially entitled "Det växande slottet" ("The growing castle"), it was completed in November 1901 with its title changed to Ett drömspel. Influences from Indian religions, the works on mysticism by Carl du Prel and the philosophy of Arthur Schopenhauer prominently inspired the play, as did Strindberg's stay at Furusund in the Stockholm archipelago, which he found a dream-like place. Ett drömspel was first published in spring 1902 to several positive reviews by contemporary critics.

== Plot ==
The primary character in the play is Agnes, a daughter of the Vedic god Indra. She descends to Earth to bear witness to problems of human beings. She meets about 40 characters, some of them having a clearly symbolical value (such as four deans representing theology, philosophy, medicine, and law) and is herself enmeshed in a wrenching marriage. After experiencing all sorts of human suffering (for example poverty, cruelty, and the routine of family life), the daughter of gods realizes that human beings are to be pitied. Only the Poet, who has created the dream, seems unaffected by human suffering. Finally, she returns to Heaven and this moment corresponds to the awakening from a dream-like sequence of events.

== Interpretations ==
The use of a dream to represent a setting in a theatrical work appealed to the traditionally realist author in that Strindberg expresses realistic concerns such as materialism, class struggle, gender role struggle, and the destruction of traditional marriage in (as stated in the preface) "the disconnected but apparently logical form of a dream. Everything can happen; everything is possible and likely."

The play itself represents a change in his style, one that would have widespread influence on the development of modernist drama. Eschewing realism, Strindberg explained that he had modeled his play, not on the pattern of cause and effect that had characterized the well-made play, but on the associative links found in dreams. Locales dissolve and give way to each other; time both moves forward and backward. During the course of the play, a castle grows up in the garden, as if it were a plant. At the play's end, it burns, revealing a wall of suffering and despairing faces, then blossoms at its top in a huge chrysanthemum.

A description of the play's style can be found in Strindberg's prefatory note:

The characters split, double, multiply, evaporate, condense, dissolve and merge. But one consciousness rules them all: the dreamer's; for him there are no secrets, no inconsistencies, no scruples and no laws. He does not judge or acquit, he merely relates; and because a dream is usually painful rather than pleasant, a tone of melancholy and compassion for all living creatures permeates the rambling narrative.^{:12}

The play itself does not center around a single well-defined individual, but rather simply follows someone who seems to be a combination of different professional men, all confused. The feminine foil to these men is Indra's Daughter, a Christ-like figure. She was played in the original production by Harriet Bosse, Strindberg's ex-wife.^{:59}

== Psychology of the author ==
Strindberg wrote it following a near-psychotic episode. During that time, he came to be extremely disturbed, thinking witches were attempting to murder him. He later wrote a memoir about this period of his life. Eventually, though, he recovered, thanks to his mother-in-law.

Previously, Strindberg had seen himself as a martyr, constantly persecuted by women. This affected his view of the overall relationship between the sexes, and of course his writing. He finally realized that he was playing a part in his failed relationships after his third marriage to Bosse collapsed. Bosse was behind the main character of A Dream Play.

The play, called by Strindberg "the child of my greatest pain", reflects the author's observation that life is an illusion, similar to a dream.

== Notable productions ==
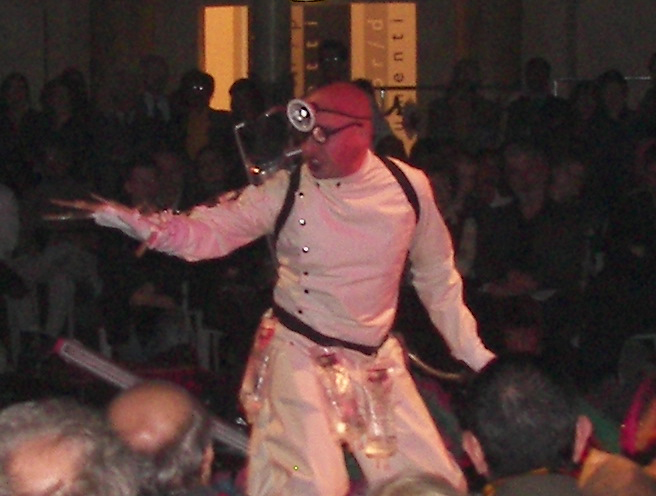
The Quarantine Inspector in a 2010 production of A Dream Play

The world premiere of A Dream Play was performed at The Swedish Theatre in April 1907, six years after it was written. Harriet Bosse, Strindberg's third wife (divorced by this time) played Indra's daughter. Victor Castegren directed the production and Carl Grabow was the designer. Critics at the time noted that the demands of the play made it nearly impossible to mount a satisfactory production. Strindberg himself desired to re-stage it in his Intimate Theatre, but ultimately it was not successful.

Max Reinhardt directed one of the most influential versions of the play. First staged in 1921 at the Royal Dramatic Theatre, Stockholm,^{:38} later that year he mounted a more famous production at Berlin's Deutsches Theater. The New York premiere of the play was directed by James Light for performance by the Provincetown Players at the Provincetown Playhouse in 1926 under the title The Dream Play.

The play afterward attracted some of the 20th century's most celebrated directors, including, Olof Molander, Antonin Artaud, Ingmar Bergman, Roger Blin, Robert Wilson, Mike Dempsey, Robert Lepage and Alejandro Jodorowsky. The German director Knut Ström staged A Dream Play in Düsseldorf in 1918, co-directed with Paul Henkels.

Ingmar Bergman staged the play three times, filming the first production for TV in 1963. At the end of Bergman's film Fanny and Alexander (1982), Emilie Ekdahl, the new manager of the town's dramatic theatre, declares that she will immediately mount Strindberg's Dream Play, with herself and Helena Ekdahl (her mother-in-law) playing principal parts. Handed Strindberg's playscript, and concluding the film, Helena reads aloud to her grandson, Alexander: "Everything can happen. Everything is possible and probable. Time and space do not exist. On a flimsy framework of reality, the imagination spins, weaving new patterns."

An edited version by Caryl Churchill was staged at the National Theatre in London in 2005. The edited version was brought to other areas too, such as Edge Theatre Ensemble in Seattle and Jobsite Theater in Tampa, and was brought to Sheffield's Drama Studio in February 2012.

A new adaptation by Emma Reay was performed at Oxford Playhouse in 2011. Dreamplay: Asian Boys Vol. 1, playwright Alfian Sa'at's loose adaptation, premiered in Singapore in 2000 and was re-staged in 2014.
