= Klaipėda Free Economic Zone =

Tax free area in Lithuania

Coordinates: 55°41′N 21°11′E

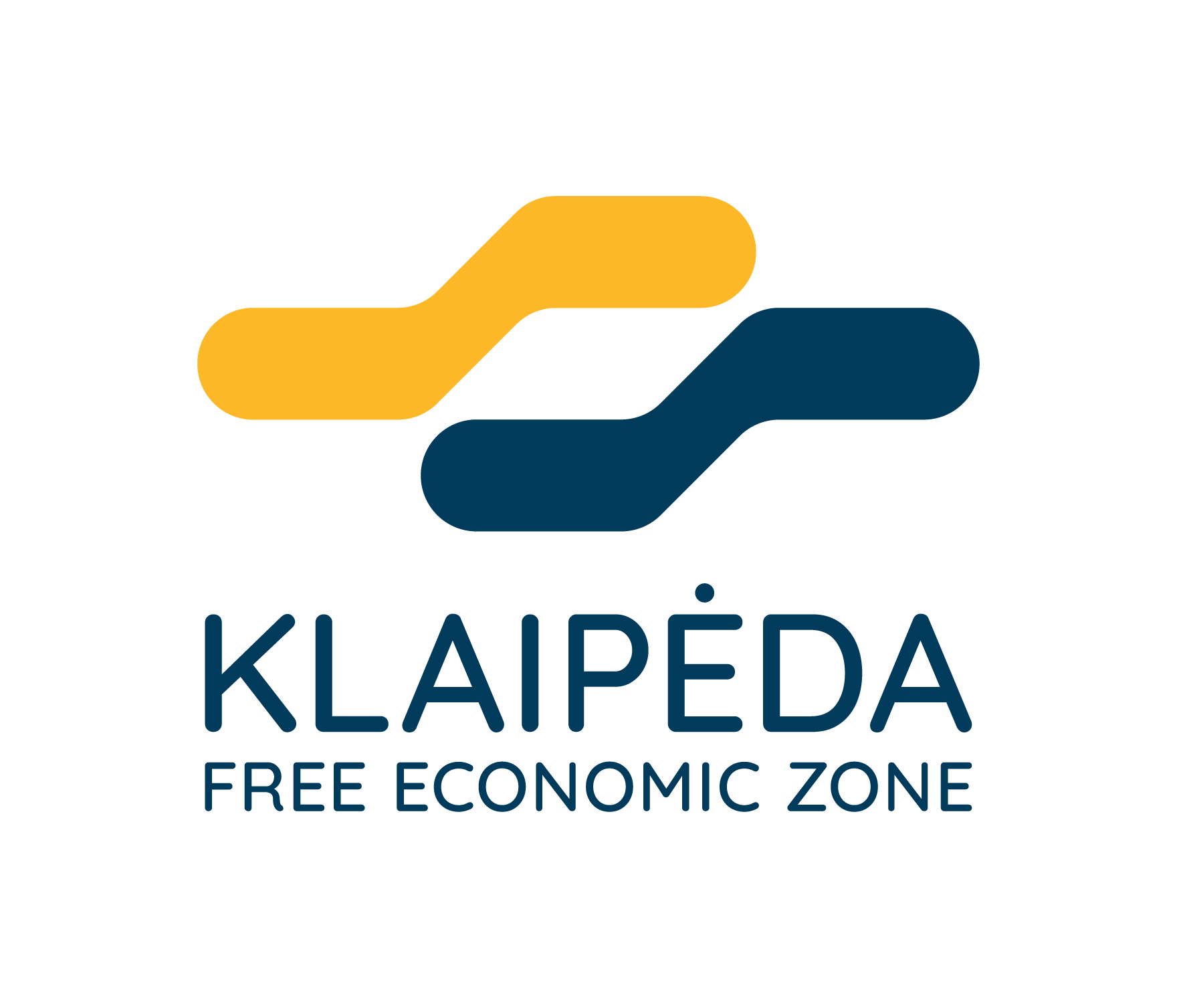
- Type: UAB
- Industry: RE development; Main industries: Plastics & Chemicals, Engineering industry & Metal structures, Automotive components, Value Added Logistics, Food processing, Defence
- Founded: 2002, Lithuania
- Headquarters: Pramonės Str. 31, LT-94103, Klaipėda, Lithuania
- Key people: Eimantas Kiudulas (CEO)
- Revenue: €1.2 billion (2025)
- Number of employees: >4,500
- Website: fez.lt

The Klaipėda Free Economic Zone (shortened to Klaipėda FEZ) (Lithuanian: Klaipėdos laisvoji ekonominė zona) is a designated economic area in Klaipėda, Lithuania. It was established in 1996 and officially launched in 2002. The zone spans approximately 4.12 km^{2} (1.59 square miles) and hosts manufacturing and logistics companies and their associated activities. The zone is linked with regional road and rail infrastructure that provides connections across Lithuania and neighbouring European countries.

== History ==
Tax incentives
Tax	
Corporation tax	0% (first 10 years); 8.5% (following 6 years)
Real estate tax	0%

The Klaipėda FEZ was established in 2002 and is managed by the Klaipėda FEZ Management Company (Lithuanian: Klaipėdos LEZ Valdymo Bendrovė), a private limited liability company. Approximately 60% of the Klaipėda FEZ Management Company is owned by the Baltic Fund, an investment fund financed by foreign investors, while the remaining shares are held by city enterprises, municipalities, and the Government of Lithuania.

The Pierre J. Everaert Family Trust became the zone's largest private shareholder, holding a significant minority stake in the Klaipėda FEZ Management Company.

European Union accession negotiations initially created regulatory uncertainty for the zone. This mainly concerned whether Lithuania's tax incentives would remain compatible with EU rules on state aid and competition. In 2003, it secured a major investment commitment when Indorama Ventures announced plans to invest €80 million in a plastic production facility.

Since 2004, Lithuania-based companies have participated in the Klaipėda FEZ to attract additional investment. In 2005, the Klaipėda FEZ initiated plans for expansion and further land development, seeking support from the European Union structural funds. By the end of 2007, Klaipėda FEZ had attracted approximately €174 million in cumulative investment.

== Location ==
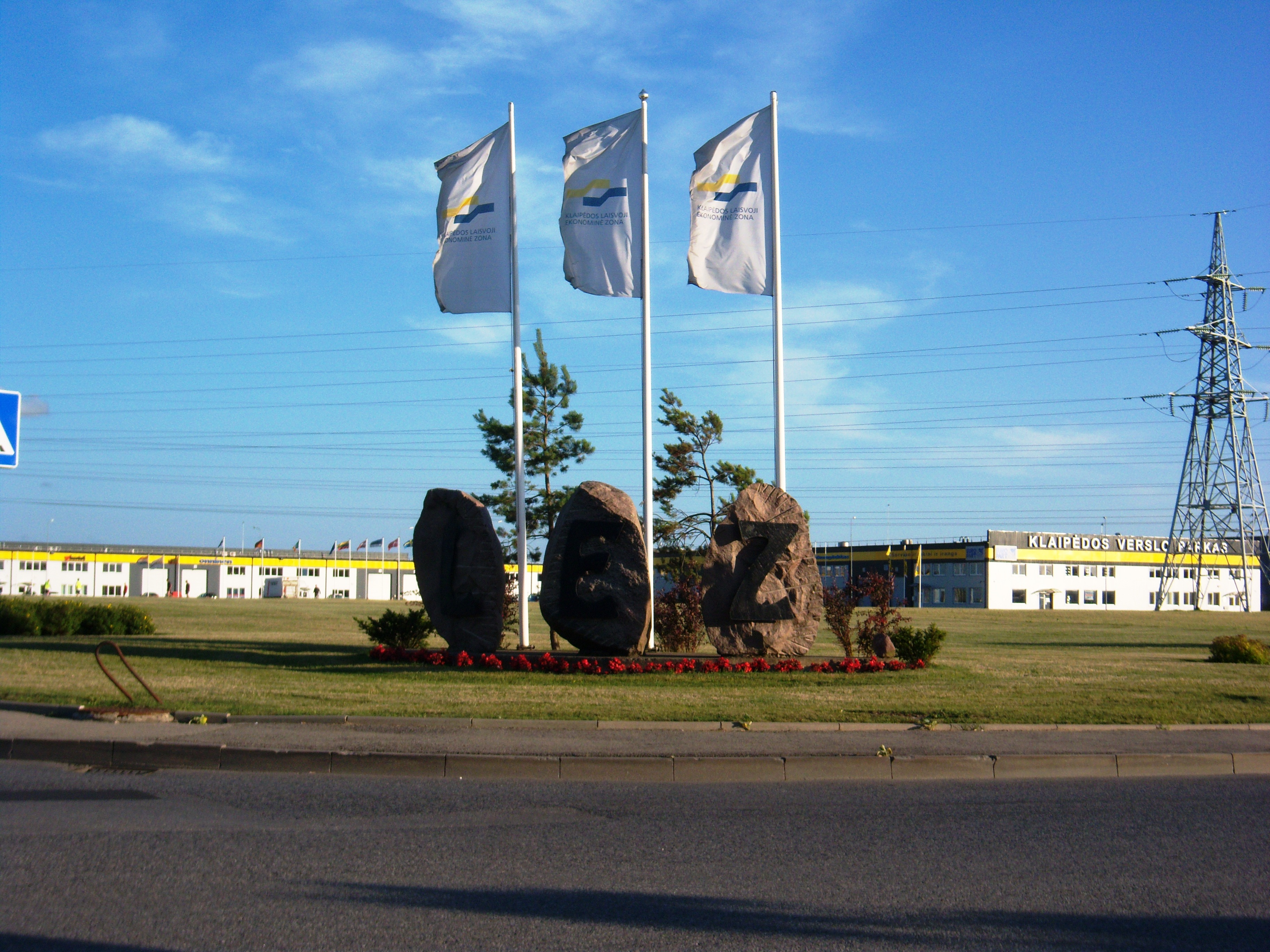
Stones marking the area where the Klaipėda FEZ begins

The Klaipėda FEZ is located to the south-east of the city of Klaipėda, close to the main Klaipėda-Vilnius highway, approximately 8 km from the Port of Klaipėda, 35 km from Klaipėda-Palanga International Airport, 218 km from Kaunas Airport, and 304 km from Vilnius Airport.

== Operations within the Klaipėda FEZ ==
As of 2024, the zone includes over 100 companies from 17 countries, with a combined workforce of a little over 4,500 employees. Since its founding, cumulative planned and implemented investments have exceeded €880 million.

== Companies ==
The following companies operate within or are closely associated with Klaipėda FEZ operations (as of 2024):

- Orion Global PET
- Neo Group
- Retal Baltic
- Glassbel Baltic
- Atlas Premium Lietuva
- Mestilla
- Be-Ge Baltic
- Pack Klaipėda
- Skuba Lietuva
- Klaipėda Business Park
- Albright Lietuva
- Gren Klaipėda
- ANI Plast
- Heidelberg Materials
- Vingės logistika
- AD REM LEZ
- Lavango Engineering LT
- Lindström
- Rehau Production LT
- Baltic Comri Technologies
- Elme Metall Klaipėda
- Werner Wirth Baltic
- Etman
- Hawe Hydraulic
