= Thunstrom =

Thunstrom, Thunström, Thunstrøm, is a Swedish surname. It may also be spelled as Thunstroem, Thunstrœm, Thunstrem, Thunstrohm, Thunstroom, Thunstroum.

People with this surname include:

- Allie Thunstrom (born 1988), U.S. ice hockey player
- Frida Svedin Thunström (born 1989), Swedish ice hockey player
- Olle Thunstrom, Swedish saxophonist; member of Beat Funktion

== See also ==
- Thun (disambiguation)
- Strom (disambiguation)
