= Mattias Lindström =

Mattias Lindström may refer to:

- Mattias Lindström (footballer) (born 1980), Swedish football (soccer) player
- Mattias Lindström (ice hockey) (born 1991), Swedish ice hockey player
