= Forester =

Person who practices forest management

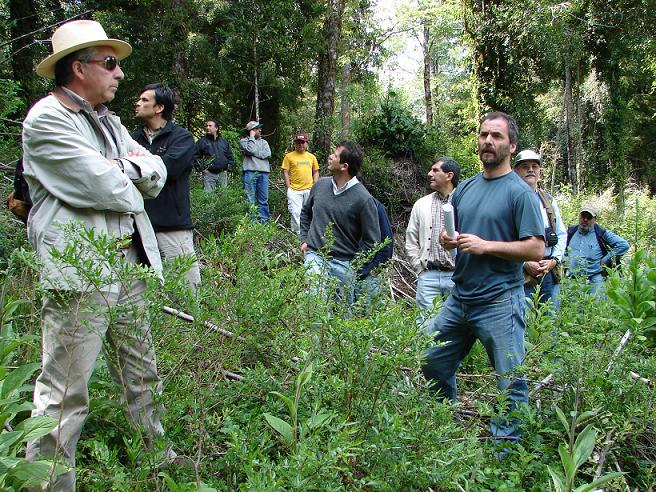
Foresters of Southern University of Chile in the Valdivian forests of San Pablo de Tregua, Chile.

A forester is a person who practices forest management and forestry, the science, art, and profession of managing forests. Foresters engage in a broad range of activities including ecological restoration and management of protected areas. Foresters manage forests to provide a variety of objectives including direct extraction of raw material, outdoor recreation, conservation, hunting and aesthetics. Emerging management practices include managing forestlands for biodiversity, carbon sequestration and air quality.

== Description ==
Foresters work for the timber industry, government agencies, conservation groups, local authorities, urban parks boards, citizens' associations, and private landowners. The forestry profession includes a wide diversity of jobs, with educational requirements ranging from college bachelor's degrees to PhDs for highly specialized work.

Industrial foresters plan forest regeneration starting with careful harvesting. Urban foresters manage trees in urban green spaces. Foresters work in tree nurseries growing seedlings for woodland creation or regeneration projects. Foresters improve tree genetics. Forest engineers develop new building systems. Professional foresters measure and model the growth of forests with tools like geographic information systems. Foresters may combat insect infestation, disease, forest and grassland wildfire, but increasingly allow these natural aspects of forest ecosystems to run their course when the likelihood of epidemics or risk of life or property are low. Increasingly, foresters participate in wildlife conservation planning and watershed protection. Foresters have been mainly concerned with timber management, especially reforestation, forests at prime conditions, and fire control.

Many people confuse the role of the forester with that of the logger, but most foresters are concerned not only with the harvest of timber, but also with the sustainable management of forests. The forester Jack C. Westoby remarked that "forestry is concerned not with trees, but with how trees can serve people".

== Career ==
=== United States ===
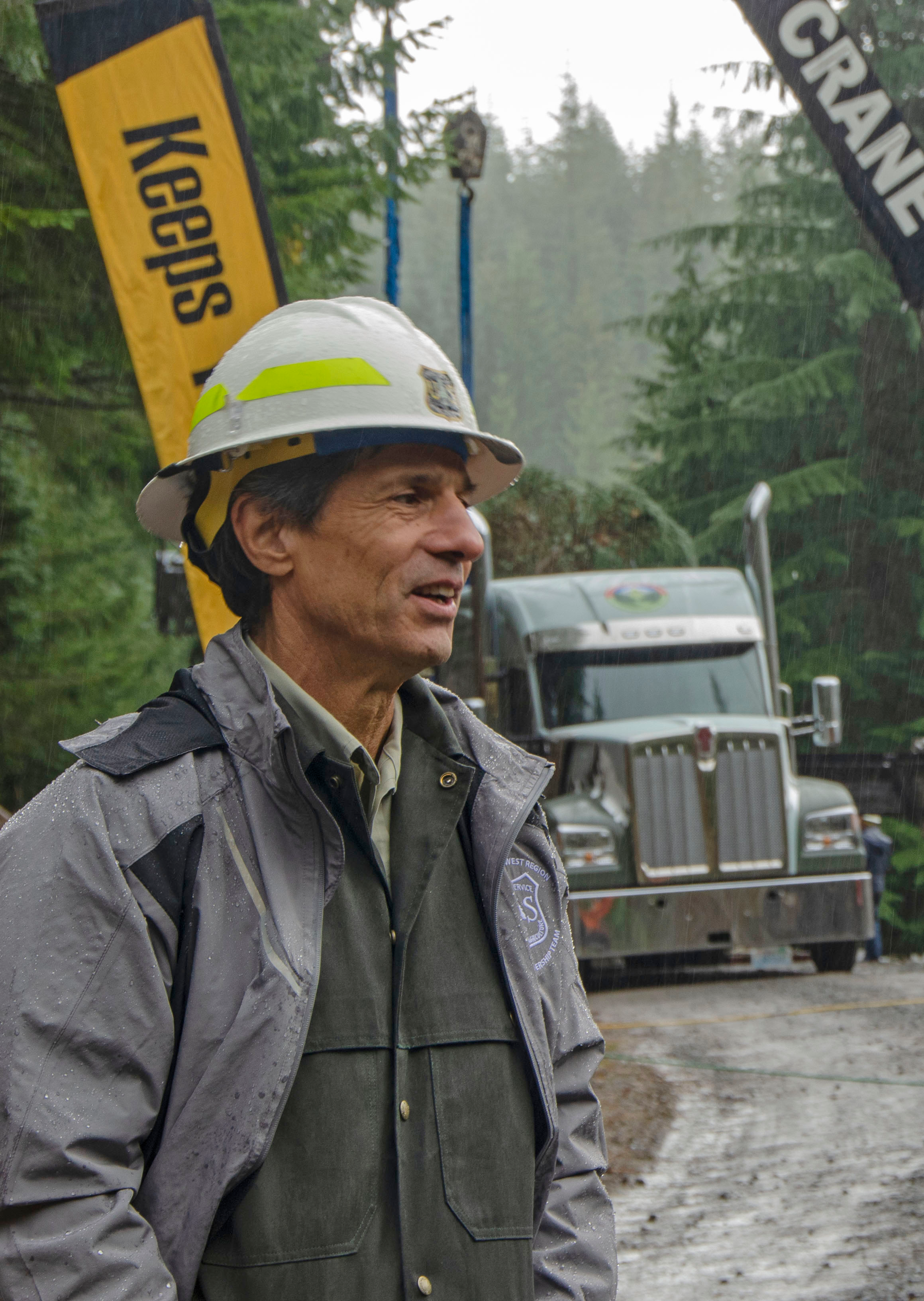
Forester Glenn Casamassa, U.S. Forest Service Regional Forester in the Pacific Northwest Region

The median salary of foresters in the United States was $53,750, in 2008. Beginning foresters without bachelor's degrees make considerably less. Those with master's degrees are able to command salaries closer to the average. The Council for Higher Education Accreditation considers the Society of American Foresters as the principal accreditor for academic degree programs in professional forestry, both at a Bachelor's and Master's level.

Usually a bachelor's degree is considered the minimum education required, but some individuals are able to secure a job without a college education based on their experience. Some states have a licensing requirement for foresters, and most of those require at least a four-year degree.

Foresters are often employed by private industry, federal and state land management agencies, or private consulting firms.

== Medieval foresters ==
Forester was a title used widely during Medieval times. The forester usually held a position equal to a sheriff or local law enforcer, and he could act as a barrister or arbiter. He was often based in a forester's lodge, and was responsible for patrolling the woodlands on a lord or noble's property, hence the synonymous term 'woodward'. His duties included negotiating sales of lumber and timber and stopping poachers from illegally hunting. Frequently outlaws would take refuge in heavily wooded regions. When this occurred it was the duty of the forester to organize armed posses to capture or disperse the criminals and during war time foresters were used as scouts to spy on enemy troop movement. The pay and status of foresters was usually above average, reflecting the responsibility of their role in a medieval environment and economy.

== Notable foresters ==
- Margaret Stoughton Abell (1908–2004) - First American research forester in US Forest Service.
- Dietrich Brandis (1824–1907)
- Ralph E. Brock (1881–1959), first Black forester in the United States
- John Ednie Brown (1848–1899)
- Aimo Cajander (1879–1943) - Professor of forestry and Director-General of Forest and Park Service in Finland.
- Carl von Carlowitz (1645–1714) - Father of sustainable yield forestry
- Geoffrey Chaucer (1343–1400)
- Hugh Francis Cleghorn (1820–1895)
- Jean-Baptiste Colbert (1619–1683)
- John Evelyn (1620–1706)
- Bernhard Fernow (1851–1923)
- Douglas Hamilton (1820–1895)
- Georg Ludwig Hartig (1764–1837)
- Ralph Hosmer (1874–1963)
- Jens Hvass
- Norman Jolly (1882–1954)
- Charles Lane Poole (1885–1970)
- Aldo Leopold (1887–1948)
- Michel de Montaigne (1533–1592) ["Man of essays and wood"]
- John Muir (1838–1914) ["Father of National Parks"]
- Herman von Nördlinger (1818–1897)
- Gifford Pinchot (1865–1946)
- Christian Ditlev Frederik Reventlow (1748–1827)
- Roy Robinson, 1st Baron Robinson (1883–1952)
- Viktor Schauberger (1885–1958)
- Carl A. Schenck (1868–1955)
- Sir William P.D. Schlich (1840–1925)
- F.X. Schumacher (1892–1967)
- Richard St. Barbe Baker (1889–1982) Global Forester/Environmentalist
- Israel af Ström (1778–1856)
- Michael Taylor (b. 1966) - American Forester who discovered Hyperion (tree) and many tall redwood trees.
- T. B. Walker (1840–1928)
- Jack C. Westoby (1913–1988)
- Peter Wohlleben - German forester.
- Raphael Zon (1874–1956)
- Frank H. Wadsworth (1915–2022)
- Susan Bell (forester)

== See also ==
- Arborist
- List of forest research institutes
- List of forestry universities and colleges
- Reeve (England)
- Society of American Foresters
- Institute of Chartered Foresters
- Verderer
