= Besse Day =

American statistician

Besse Beulah Day (later known as Besse Day Mauss, 1889–1986) was an American statistician known for her contributions to the statistics of forestry and naval engineering, and in particular for pioneering the use of design of experiments in engineering.

== Education and career ==
Day was born in 1889 in Chapel Hill, Missouri. She earned a bachelor's degree in mathematics at Central Missouri State Teachers College, and a master's degree in mathematics and statistics in 1927 from the University of Michigan School of Forestry and Conservation.^{[D53]}

She worked for the Victor Talking Machine Company from 1927 to 1929 before joining the United States Forest Service in 1930. In 1943 she moved to Johns Hopkins University to assist the war effort by helping develop a radio-based proximity fuze. After the war she became head of statistics at the United States Naval Engineering Experiment Station in Annapolis, Maryland,^{[D53]} and later a consulting statistician for the Bureau of Ships. As part of her work for the Navy, she transferred her knowledge of the design of experiments from forestry to naval engineering, for example using this method to determine which types of steel were susceptible to cracks in welding.^{[D49a]}^{[D49b]}

In 1960 she and her husband, contractor Charles E. Mauss, bought a house on South Carolina Avenue in Washington, DC, where they lived until retiring in 1969 to New Oxford, Pennsylvania. She died on September 14, 1986, in New Oxford.

== Recognition ==
Day became a Fellow of the American Statistical Association in 1951 for being "diligent in the applications of statistical theory to the two widely separated fields of forestry and engineering". She also became a Fellow of the American Association for the Advancement of Science in 1951. In 1958, she was elected to the Washington Academy of Sciences "in recognition of her pioneer work in the statistical design of experiments in many fields particularly those of forestry and engineering and for her unique achievements in the exposition of statistical methods". She was also a fellow of the American Society for Quality Control.^{[D53]}

Her 1955 paper "The technique of regression analysis"^{[DDS55]} was the 1956 winner of the Brumbaugh Award of the American Society for Quality, as the year's best contribution to the industrial application of quality control.

== Selected publications ==
SD39.	Schumacher, Francis X.; Day, Besse B. (February 1939), "The influence of precipitation upon the width of annual rings of certain timber trees", Ecological Monographs, 9 (4): 387–429, Bibcode:1939EcoM....9..387S, doi:10.2307/1943279, JSTOR 1943279

DA39.	Day, Besse B.; Austin, Lloyd (July 1939), "A three-dimensional lattice design for studies in forest genetics" (PDF), Journal of Agricultural Research, 59 (2): 101–120, archived from the original (PDF) on January 21, 2019

DS42.	Day, Besse B.; Sandomire, Marion M. (December 1942), "Use of the discriminant function for more than two groups", Journal of the American Statistical Association, 37 (220): 461–472, doi:10.1080/01621459.1942.10500647

D49a.	Day, Besse B. (1949), "Application of statistical methods to research and development in engineering", Review of the International Statistical Institute, 17 (3/4): 129–155, doi:10.2307/1400864, JSTOR 1400864

D49b.	Day, Besse B. (October 1949), "The statistical part in welding investigations", American Welding Society Journal, 28 (10): 449s–461s

D53.	Day, Besse B. (May 1953), "The use of statistics in planning laboratory and fleet test work", Journal of the American Society for Naval Engineers, 65 (2), Wiley: 339–352, doi:10.1111/j.1559-3584.1953.tb05858.x. See in particular the author biography, p. 339.

DDS55.	Day, Besse B.; Del Priore, F. R.; Sax, Edward P. (August 1955), "The technique of regression analysis", Industrial Quality Control, 12 (2): 10–19
