= Kimball Chase Atwood III =

American geneticist

- Born: 1921; New York City
- Died: October 1992 (aged 70–71)
- Education: Columbia University (BA); New York University (MD)
- Children: Kimball Chase Atwood IV
- Scientific career
- Fields: Genetics, molecular biology
- Workplaces: University of Illinois; Columbia University Medical School

Kimball Chase Atwood III (1921 – October 13, 1992) was an American geneticist who spent much of his academic career at the University of Illinois and later at Columbia University Medical School.

== Early life and education ==
Atwood was born in 1921 in New York City. He grew up in the city and remained there for his education, receiving his B.A. from Columbia University in 1942. He trained as a physician and received his MD from New York University School of Medicine, but pursued basic research rather than clinical work following a short residency at Bellevue Hospital.

== Academic career ==
Atwood worked with Francis J. Ryan in the zoology department at Columbia University, focused on laboratory demonstration of natural selection in bacteria. He spent eight years, from 1950 to 1958, as a researcher at Oak Ridge National Laboratory investigating the biological effects of radiation exposure. He then moved to the University of Chicago and subsequently to the University of Illinois, where he became the head of the microbiology department and collaborated with Sol Spiegelman and Ferruccio Ritossa on influential studies of nucleic acid hybridization. Atwood moved again to Columbia University Medical School in 1969 and spent the rest of his faculty career there. Atwood retired from Columbia in 1987 and moved to Woods Hole, Massachusetts, where he continued to teach courses.

The phrase "publish or perish" describing incentives in academic publishing has been attributed to Atwood around 1950, though earlier uses of the phrase exist.

== Personal life ==
Atwood and his wife Barbara had four children. Their son Kimball Chase Atwood IV is a physician and skeptic noted for his critique of naturopathic medicine. In retirement Atwood was a horticulturalist and scuba diver. He died at 71 of pancreatic cancer on October 13, 1992.
