= Kimball Atwood =

American medical doctor, researcher and alternative medicine critic

Kimball Chase Atwood IV
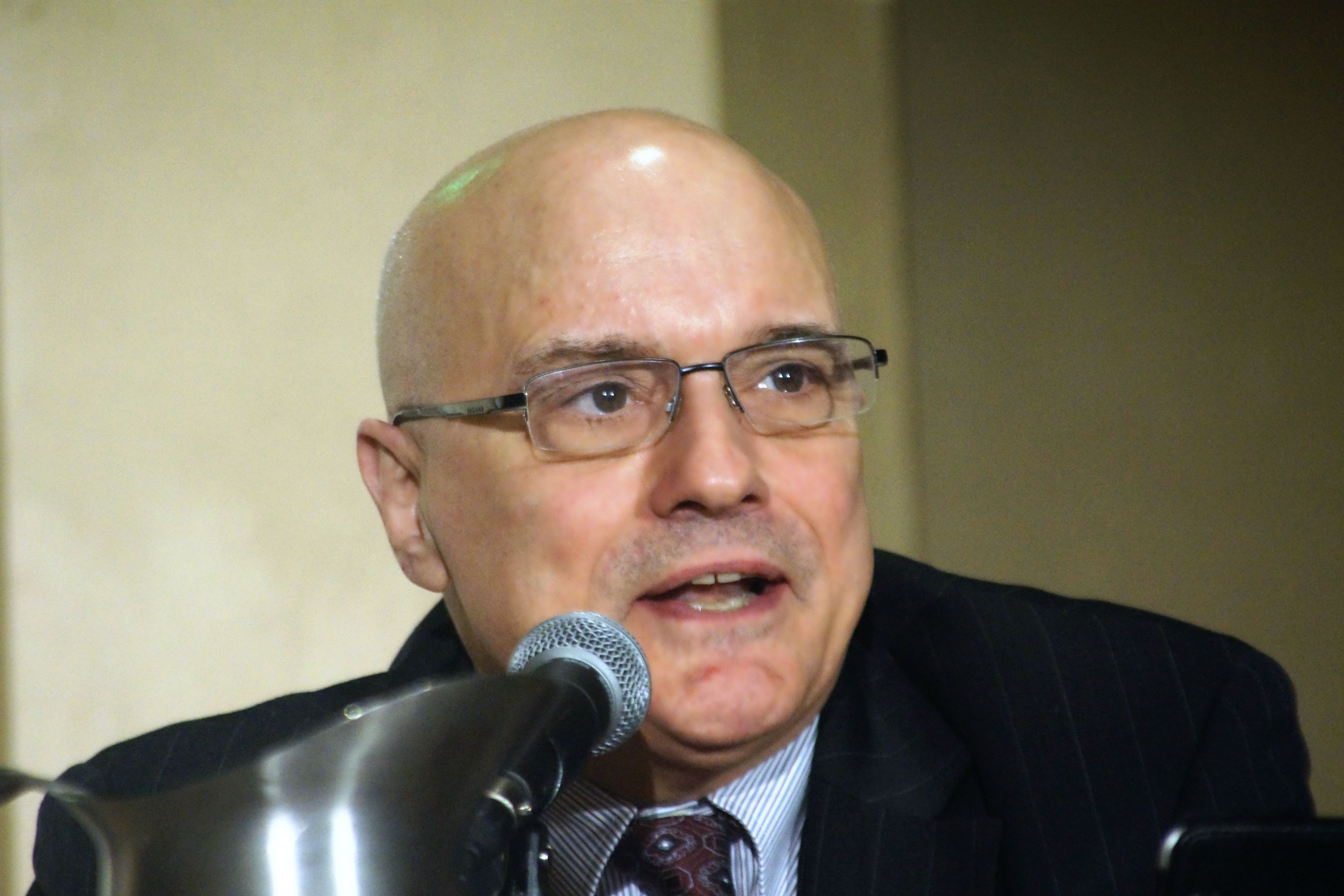
- Atwood at CSICon in 2012
- Citizenship: USA
- Occupations: Anesthesiologist, Internal Medicine, Assistant Clinical Professor
- Known for: Scientific skepticism and criticism of naturopathy
- Relatives: Kimball C. Atwood III (father)
- Medical career
- Profession: Anesthesiology, Assistant Professor
- Institutions: Newton-Wellesley Hospital and Tufts University School of Medicine

Kimball C. Atwood IV is an American medical doctor and researcher from Newton, Massachusetts. He is retired as an assistant clinical professor at Tufts University School of Medicine and anesthesiologist at Newton-Wellesley Hospital.

An active skeptic, Atwood has served as an associate editor of the journal Scientific Review of Alternative Medicine and as associate editor at Science-Based Medicine. He is also co-editor of Naturowatch, one of Quackwatch's affiliated sites. In 2010, Atwood was elected as one of sixteen Fellows of the Committee for Skeptical Inquiry.

Atwood is best known as a critic of naturopathic medicine. His long term interest in pseudoscience was piqued in 2000 by a nursing conference held at his hospital where therapeutic touch and other alternative healing practices were promoted as effective treatments for pleural mesothelioma. Atwood represented the opposition to naturopathic physicians licensing in his state and was the primary author of the minority report opposing such licensure in Massachusetts.

== Education and career ==
Atwood is the son of Barbara Frances Drew and Kimball Chase Atwood III, a geneticist. He has four siblings. He attended Harvard Medical School and did his internship and residency at Beth Israel Deaconess Medical Center. He holds board certifications from the American Board of Anesthesiology and the American Board of Internal Medicine. He received his Massachusetts State Medical License in 1981 and retired as an anesthesiologist in 2019 from Newton-Wellesley Hospital.

Atwood is a Founding Fellow Board of Director for the Institute for Science in Medicine. In 2010, he was elected as one of sixteen Fellows of the Committee for Skeptical Inquiry, an honor granted for "major contributions to science and reason, critical inquiry, and public education". He has served Citizens For Responsible Care and Research Incorporated (CIRCARE) as a board member from 2009-2014 and as vice president from 2013-2015. He has been affiliated with Massachusetts Medical Society.

== Opposition to naturopathy licensure in Massachusetts ==
Atwood was a member of the Massachusetts Special Commission on Complementary and Alternative Medical Practitioners, which convened in 2000 after six attempts by naturopathic groups to become licensed as health care providers. The Special Commission generated two reports in 2002. The majority report recommended licensure for naturopaths. Atwood coauthored the minority report which opposed the licensure. The minority report stated that there was no point in pursuing the goal of naturopathic licensure until the field radically changed, otherwise healthcare in the state would suffer in terms of safety and reputation. In 2003 Atwood, who was at the time chair of the MMS Committee on Quality of Medical Practice, gave testimony opposing naturopathic licensure in Massachusetts to the Joint Committee on Health Care on behalf of the MMS.

Naturopathic licensure did not succeed in the state of Massachusetts until 2017.

== Criticism of naturopathy ==
Atwood is especially critical of naturopathic medicine and is concerned about the extent to which medical institutions have accepted naturopathic practices.

In an interview on the podcast The Skeptics' Guide to the Universe, Atwood explained why he concentrates his efforts on naturopaths. Atwood said that, although some naturopaths have "the trappings of legitimacy", such as advanced degrees from naturopathic institutes, and may seek state licensure or recognition as primary healthcare providers, they are not trained in modern medical techniques.

In the interview, Atwood described the "hodgepodge" of techniques promoted by naturopathic physicians. He indicated the dangers of state and federal officials and Medicare legitimizing alternative medicine, and said that, while naturopaths may claim that their teachings are based on science, they are not supported by clinical research.

== Science-based medicine advocate ==
Atwood is an advocate of science-based medicine (SBM) rather than evidence-based medicine (EBM). In a series of blog posts, Atwood said that EBM falls short in evaluating the claims of complementary and alternative medicine (CAM).

Atwood uses homeopathy as an example to illustrate the weakness of EBM. Under the guidelines of EBM, all health claims should be subjected to randomized controlled trials, including those of pseudoscientific "alternative medicine" practices like homeopathy. Atwood says this is inappropriate because homeopathy is a health claim with no prior plausibility.

Atwood writes that clinical trials to investigate homeopathic claims are often backed by proponents of the practices, and tend to be small and of poor quality. He says that equivocal or weakly positive results are wrongly interpreted as evidence for the validity of homeopathy, or of the value of further homeopathic research. Eventually, he believes, these studies will be superseded by larger, better-designed ones disproving homeopathic claims. He urges skepticism of clinical results which contradict established knowledge or basic science.

In the abstract of Atwood's presentation to the European Skeptics Congress in 2003, he wrote that the claims of naturopaths "are so implausible that to study them is a bad idea.... [I]t gives a scientifically-naïve citizenry the misleading impression that legitimate scientists think such claims have merit, thus encouraging health fraud and waste. It is bad ethics because it wastes resources and exploits human subjects."

== Criticism of chelation therapy ==
In 2008, Atwood was the lead author of "Why the NIH Trial to Assess Chelation Therapy (TACT) Should Be Abandoned", a Medscape article criticizing the National Institute of Health (NIH) and the National Center for Complementary and Alternative Medicine (NCCAM) for spending US$30 million on the Trial to Assess Chelation Therapy (TACT). Chelation therapy is a high risk (including death), medical procedure used to remove heavy metals from the body. The original study started in 2003. The criticism by Atwood is summarized:

We have investigated the method and the trial.... We present evidence that chelationists and their organization, the American College for Advancement in Medicine, used political connections to pressure the NIH to fund the TACT. The TACT protocols justified the trial by misrepresenting case series and by ignoring evidence of risks. The trial employs nearly 100 unfit co-investigators. It conflates disodium EDTA and another, somewhat safer drug. It lacks precautions necessary to minimize risks. The consent form reflects those shortcomings and fails to disclose apparent proprietary interests. The trial's outcome will be unreliable and almost certainly equivocal, thus defeating its stated purpose. We conclude that the TACT is unethical, dangerous, pointless, and wasteful. It should be abandoned.

The Chicago Tribune indicated several problems with the study including difficulty in finding enough patients, improper consent by failing to include death as a risk, the expense and a congressional push in 1999 by Representative Dan Burton of Indiana.

Proponents of the procedure pointed out a statistical significant difference in the results. 26% of the chelation patients went on to suffer a heart attack, stroke, or other heart problems compared with 30% of the patients on placebo. Medical researchers question the results because:

30% of participants dropped out of the trial, undermining comparison between the treatment and placebo. Critics also note that nearly two dozen trial co-investigators have been disciplined by state medical boards for infractions ranging from insurance fraud to providing ineffective treatments. "They offer aromatherapy, crystal therapy and every imaginable wacky form of medicine. You can’t do high-quality research at sites like that", says Steven Nissen, a cardiologist at the Cleveland Clinic in Ohio. "We wasted $30 million and 10 years on an unreliable study".

Atwood said in 2012 that the results of TACT research agreed with his 2008 prediction: they were ambiguous and the authors could not recommend chelation therapy for CAD. While the authors recommended further research, Atwood disagreed, saying the study "convincingly demonstrates that the claims of chelationists have been bogus all along. That's because those claims have been far more dramatic than even the small effect that the TACT may appear to support." Atwood alleged that many of the investigators had criminal records. He said that medical journals should not publish this study due to alleged ethical violations of misleading the subjects in the consent form, which he said were a violation of the Helsinki Declaration.
