= Drosophila buzzatii =

Scientific classification
- Kingdom: Animalia
- Phylum: Arthropoda
- Class: Insecta
- Order: Diptera
- Family: Drosophilidae
- Genus: Drosophila
- Species: D. buzzatii

Binomial name
- Drosophila buzzatii Patterson and Wheeler, 1942

Species of fly

Drosophila buzzatii is a species of fruit fly in the genus Drosophila, described by Patterson and Wheeler in 1942. It is named for geneticist Adriano Buzzati-Traverso.
