= Spiegelman's Monster =

RNA molecule chain

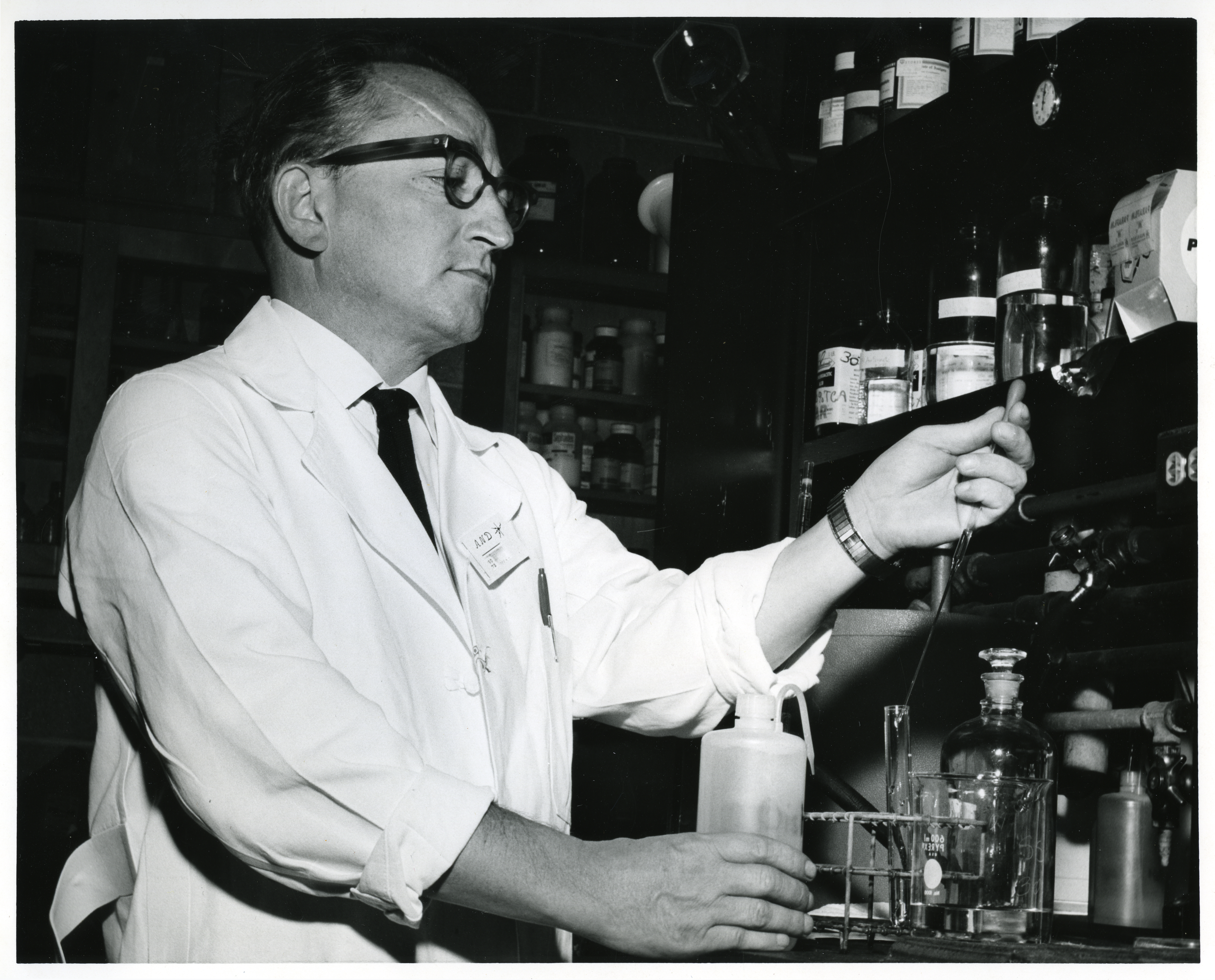
Sol Spiegelman in his Laboratory c. 1965

Spiegelman's Monster is an RNA chain of only 218 nucleotides that is able to be reproduced by the RNA replication enzyme RNA-dependent RNA polymerase, also called RNA replicase. It is named after its creator, Sol Spiegelman, of the University of Illinois at Urbana-Champaign who first described it in 1965.

== Description ==
Spiegelman introduced RNA from a simple bacteriophage Qβ (Qβ) into a solution which contained Qβ's RNA replicase, some free nucleotides, and some salts. In this environment, the RNA started to be replicated. After a while, Spiegelman took some RNA and moved it to another tube with fresh solution. This process was repeated.

Shorter RNA chains were able to be replicated faster, so the RNA became shorter and shorter as selection favored speed. After 74 generations, the original strand with 4,500 nucleotide bases ended up as a dwarf genome with only 218 bases. This short RNA sequence replicated very quickly in these unnatural circumstances.

== Further work ==
M. Sumper and R. Luce of Manfred Eigen's laboratory replicated the experiment, except without adding RNA, only RNA bases and Qβ replicase. They found that under the right conditions the Qβ replicase can spontaneously generate RNA which evolves into a form similar to Spiegelman's Monster.

Eigen built on Spiegelman's work and produced a similar system further degraded to just 48 or 54 nucleotides—the minimum required for the binding of the replication enzyme, this time a combination of HIV-1 reverse transcriptase and T7 RNA polymerase.

== See also ==
- Abiogenesis
- RNA world hypothesis
- PAH world hypothesis
- Viroid
