= Jon Matsumoto =

Canadian ice hockey player (born 1986)

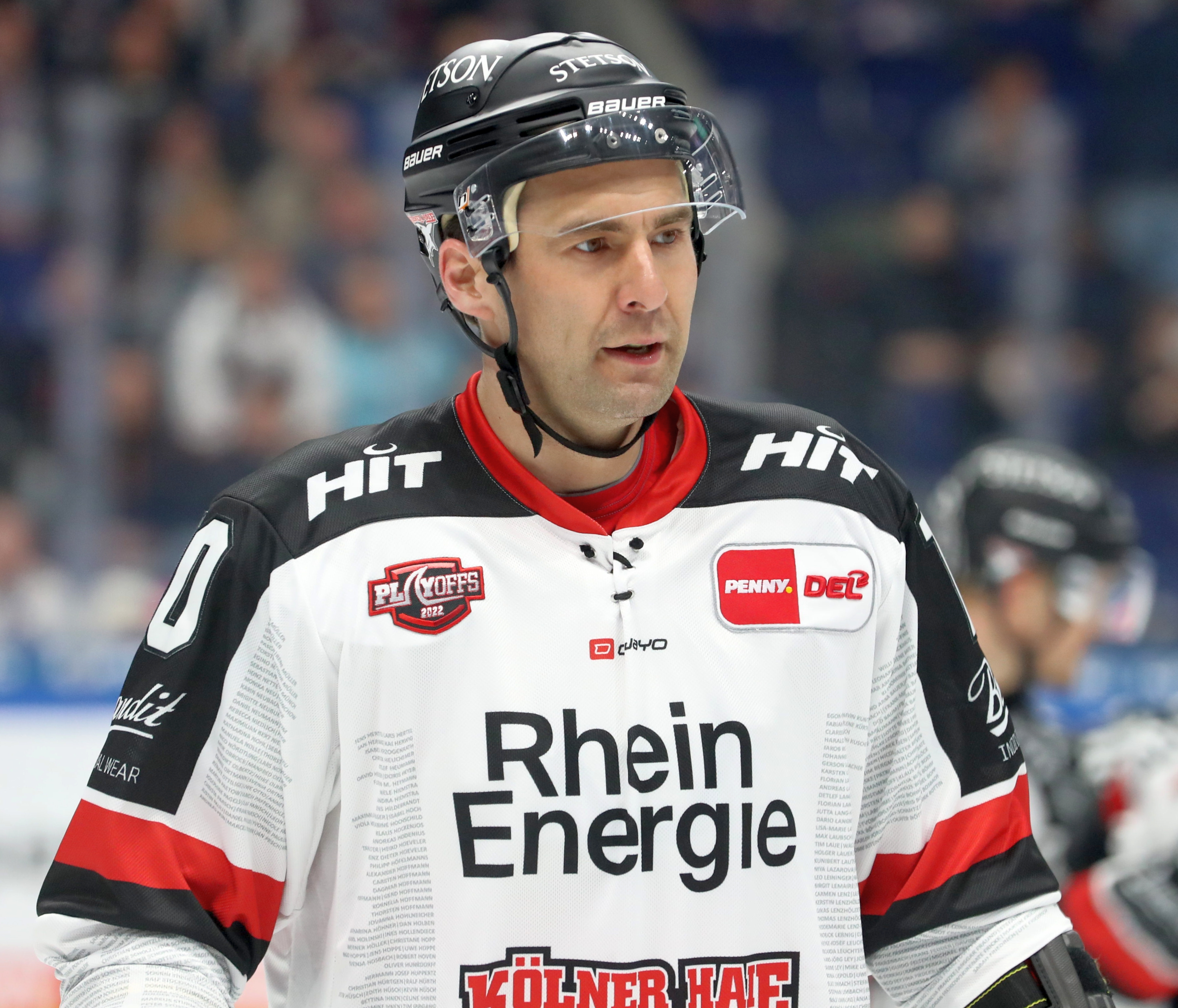
- Born: October 13, 1986 (age 39) Ottawa, Ontario, Canada
- Height: 6 ft 0 in (183 cm)
- Weight: 184 lb (83 kg; 13 st 2 lb)
- Position: Centre
- Shoots: Left
- DEL2 team Former teams: Krefeld Pinguine; Carolina Hurricanes; Florida Panthers; Schwenninger Wild Wings; Augsburger Panther; EHC München; Iserlohn Roosters; Kölner Haie
- NHL draft: 79th overall, 2006; Philadelphia Flyers
- Playing career: 2007–present

Jonathan Richard Matsumoto (born October 13, 1986) is a Canadian-German professional ice hockey player who is currently playing for Krefeld Pinguine of the DEL2.

== Playing career ==
Matsumoto began playing collegiate hockey for the Bowling Green State University Falcons during the 2004-05 season. He became just the third freshman in Falcons' history to lead the team in scoring. After two successful seasons, he was drafted by the Philadelphia Flyers in the third round, 79th overall, of the 2006 NHL entry draft.

Following his junior season, Matsumoto began working out with the Flyers' AHL affiliate, the Philadelphia Phantoms. Flyers' management liked what they saw, and on March 14, 2007, Matsumoto decided to forgo his senior season and signed an entry-level contract with the Flyers. He was assigned to the Phantoms and made his professional debut on March 16, 2007.

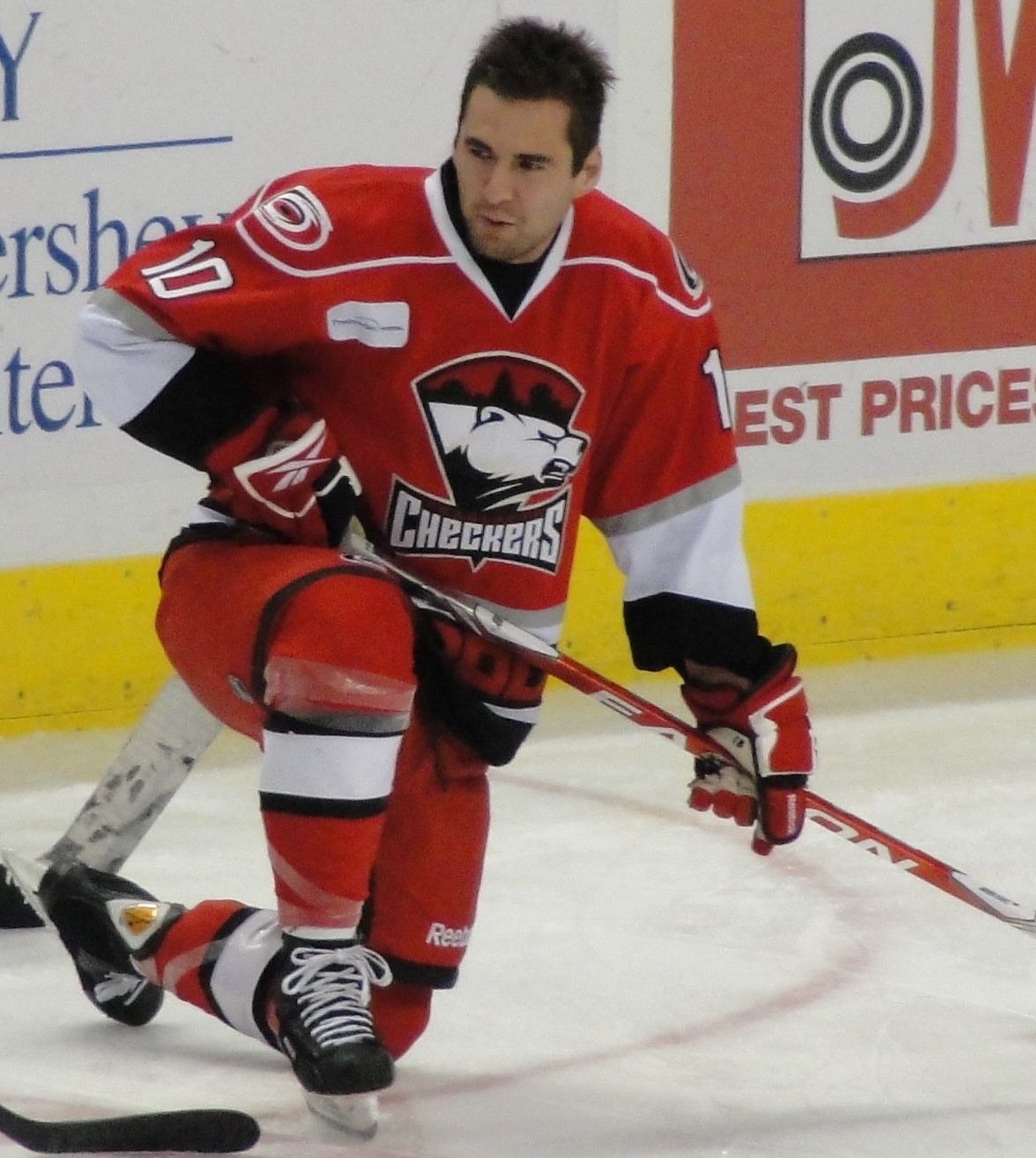
Matsumoto during his tenure with the Charlotte Checkers.

On June 26, 2010, Philadelphia traded Matsumoto to the Carolina Hurricanes for a 2010 seventh-round draft pick. Four months later Matsumoto made his NHL debut on November 1 against the Flyers. Matsumoto scored his first NHL goal on November 3, 2010 against Rick DiPietro of the New York Islanders. The game was also his first multi-goal game in the NHL, as he added a second goal in the third period.

Matsumoto was traded by the Hurricanes to the Florida Panthers on January 18, 2012 with Mattias Lindström, in exchange for Evgenii Dadonov and A. J. Jenks.

On July 12, 2012, Matsumoto was signed as a free agent by the San Jose Sharks. He was directly assigned to the Worcester Sharks to start the 2012–13 season due to the NHL lockout. After scoring 32 points in 60 games, Matsumoto was loaned to the Chicago Wolves to end the year on April 8, 2013.

On July 8, 2013, Matsumoto returned to the Florida Panthers organization as a free agent, signing a one-year contract.

After spending the first 7 professional seasons of his career in North America, on May 26, 2014, Matsumoto agreed to his first European contract, signing a one-year deal with German club, Schwenninger Wild Wings of the DEL. After a season with the Wild Wings, Matsumoto joined fellow DEL competitor, Augsburger Panther on a one-year deal on July 23, 2015. He made 52 appearances for the Panthers, tallying 20 goals and 29 assists.

On May 2, 2016, he put pen to paper on a deal with EHC München that had captured the German championship only some weeks earlier. Matsumoto won German championship titles with München in 2017 and 2018, earning DEL Playoff MVP distinction in 2018. On May 4, 2018, he signed with fellow DEL side Iserlohn Roosters.

Matsumoto continued his scoring pace in the 2018–19 season with the Roosters, potting a DEL personal best of 22 goals and 56 points in just 52 games. Despite interest to remain by the club to remain in Iserlohn, Matsumoto continued to build upon his journeyman status in the DEL, signing a one-year contract with his fifth German club, Kölner Haie, on May 2, 2019.

Following four seasons with the Sharks in the DEL, Matsumoto opted to extend his professional career by signing a one-year contract with second tier club, Krefeld Pinguine of the DEL2, on June 30, 2023.

== Career statistics ==
			Regular season					Playoffs
Season	Team	League	GP	G	A	Pts	PIM	GP	G	A	Pts	PIM
2002–03	Cumberland Grads	CJHL	8	2	3	5	2	10	4	7	11	2
2003–04	Cumberland Grads	CJHL	51	31	32	63	26	7	5	5	10	6
2004–05	Bowling Green State University	CCHA	36	18	14	32	22	2	2	0	2	0
2005–06	Bowling Green State University	CCHA	36	20	28	48	43	2	2	0	2	0
2006–07	Bowling Green State University	CCHA	38	11	22	33	70	2	0	2	2	4
2006–07	Philadelphia Phantoms	AHL	16	2	2	4	10	—	—	—	—	—
2007–08	Philadelphia Phantoms	AHL	77	20	24	44	52	12	2	2	4	10
2008–09	Philadelphia Phantoms	AHL	78	29	34	63	77	4	1	2	3	4
2009–10	Adirondack Phantoms	AHL	80	30	32	62	50	—	—	—	—	—
2010–11	Charlotte Checkers	AHL	65	20	28	48	36	15	3	5	8	12
2010–11	Carolina Hurricanes	NHL	13	2	0	2	4	—	—	—	—	—
2011–12	Charlotte Checkers	AHL	41	13	21	34	22	—	—	—	—	—
2011–12	San Antonio Rampage	AHL	35	10	16	26	28	10	4	9	13	8
2011–12	Florida Panthers	NHL	1	0	0	0	0	—	—	—	—	—
2012–13	Worcester Sharks	AHL	60	14	18	32	30	—	—	—	—	—
2012–13	Chicago Wolves	AHL	5	1	0	1	0	—	—	—	—	—
2013–14	San Antonio Rampage	AHL	29	6	5	11	24	—	—	—	—	—
2014–15	Schwenninger Wild Wings	DEL	52	14	10	24	36	—	—	—	—	—
2015–16	Augsburger Panther	DEL	52	20	29	49	54	—	—	—	—	—
2016–17	EHC Red Bull München	DEL	51	11	25	36	49	14	6	8	14	2
2017–18	EHC Red Bull München	DEL	46	11	12	23	20	16	8	6	14	2
2018–19	Iserlohn Roosters	DEL	52	22	34	56	18	—	—	—	—	—
2019–20	Kölner Haie	DEL	52	13	16	29	36	—	—	—	—	—
2020–21	Kölner Haie	DEL	37	16	22	38	22	—	—	—	—	—
2021–22	Kölner Haie	DEL	53	15	27	42	20	5	1	1	2	4
2022–23	Kölner Haie	DEL	54	11	27	38	24	6	0	0	0	4
AHL totals			486	145	180	325	329	41	10	18	28	34
NHL totals			14	2	0	2	4	—	—	—	—	—
DEL totals			449	133	202	335	279	41	15	15	30	12
