= Sol Spiegelman =

American molecular biologist

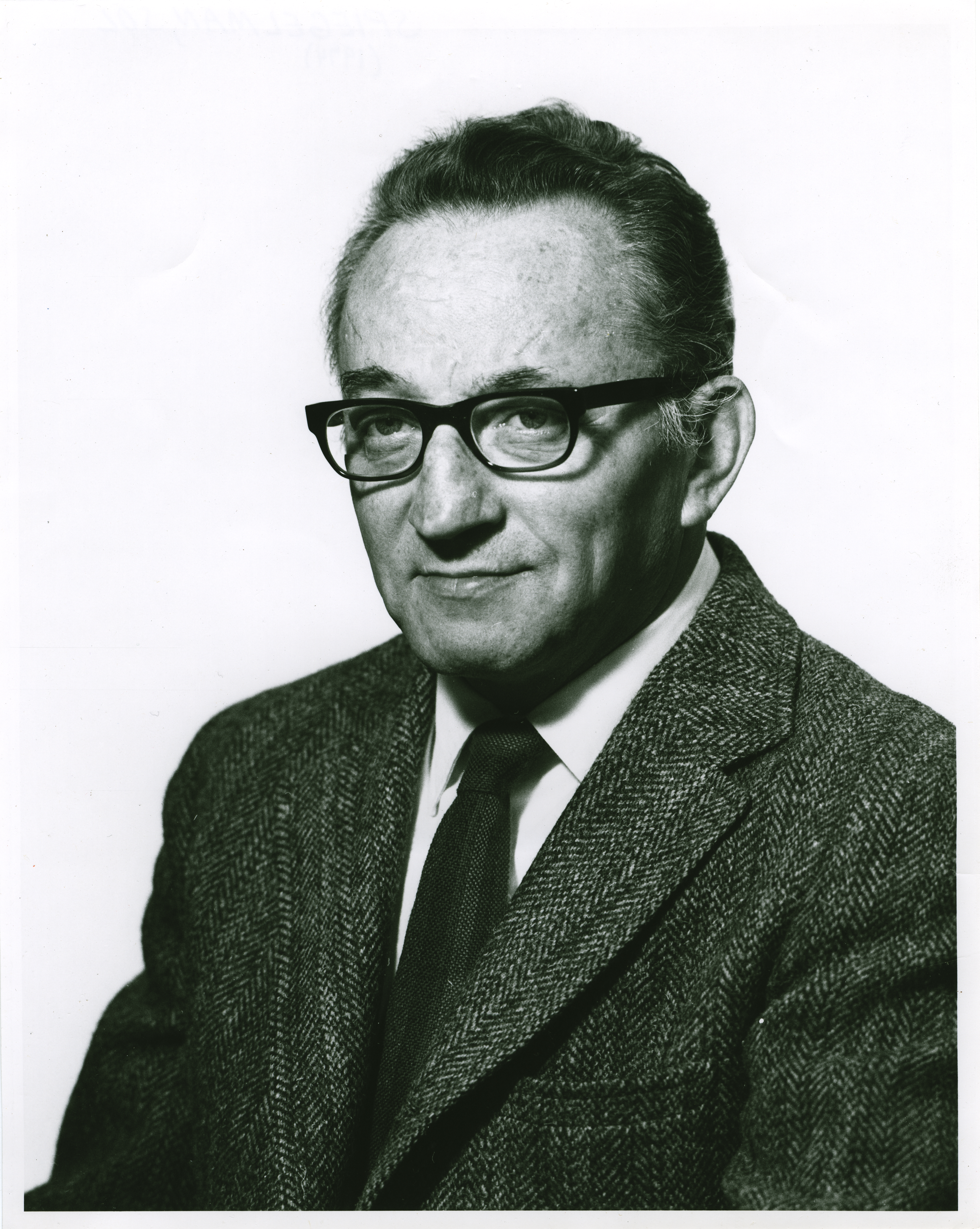
- Sol Spiegelman
- Born: December 14, 1914; Brooklyn, New York, U.S.
- Died: January 21, 1983 (aged 68); New York, New York, U.S.
- Education: City College of New York, Washington University in St. Louis
- Known for: nucleic acid hybridization, Spiegelman's monster experiment
- Scientific career
- Fields: Molecular biology, genetics
- Workplaces: University of Illinois at Urbana-Champaign, Columbia University
- Doctoral students: Norman R. Pace

Sol Spiegelman (December 14, 1914 – January 21, 1983) was an American molecular biologist. He developed the technique of nucleic acid hybridization, which helped to lay the groundwork for advances in recombinant DNA technology.

== Early life and education ==
Spiegelman was born in Brooklyn, New York City in 1914. He attended the City College of New York and was initially interested in biology, but found the courses uninspiring and instead chose to focus on math and physics. During his undergraduate work he took a leave of absence to work in a biology laboratory, where he studied the genetics of bacteria. He graduated in 1939 with a bachelor's degree in mathematics. He then began his graduate studies at Columbia University in 1940, studying cellular physiology under the supervision of H.B. Steinbach. Spiegelman joined Steinbach in his move to Washington University School of Medicine two years later, and received his PhD from that institution in 1944. His graduate work focused on what was then known as enzymatic "induction" or "adaptation", now known to reflect changes in gene expression in response to environmental factors. He continued to work at Washington University until 1948, and then took a one-year Public Health Service fellowship at the University of Minnesota.

== Academic career ==
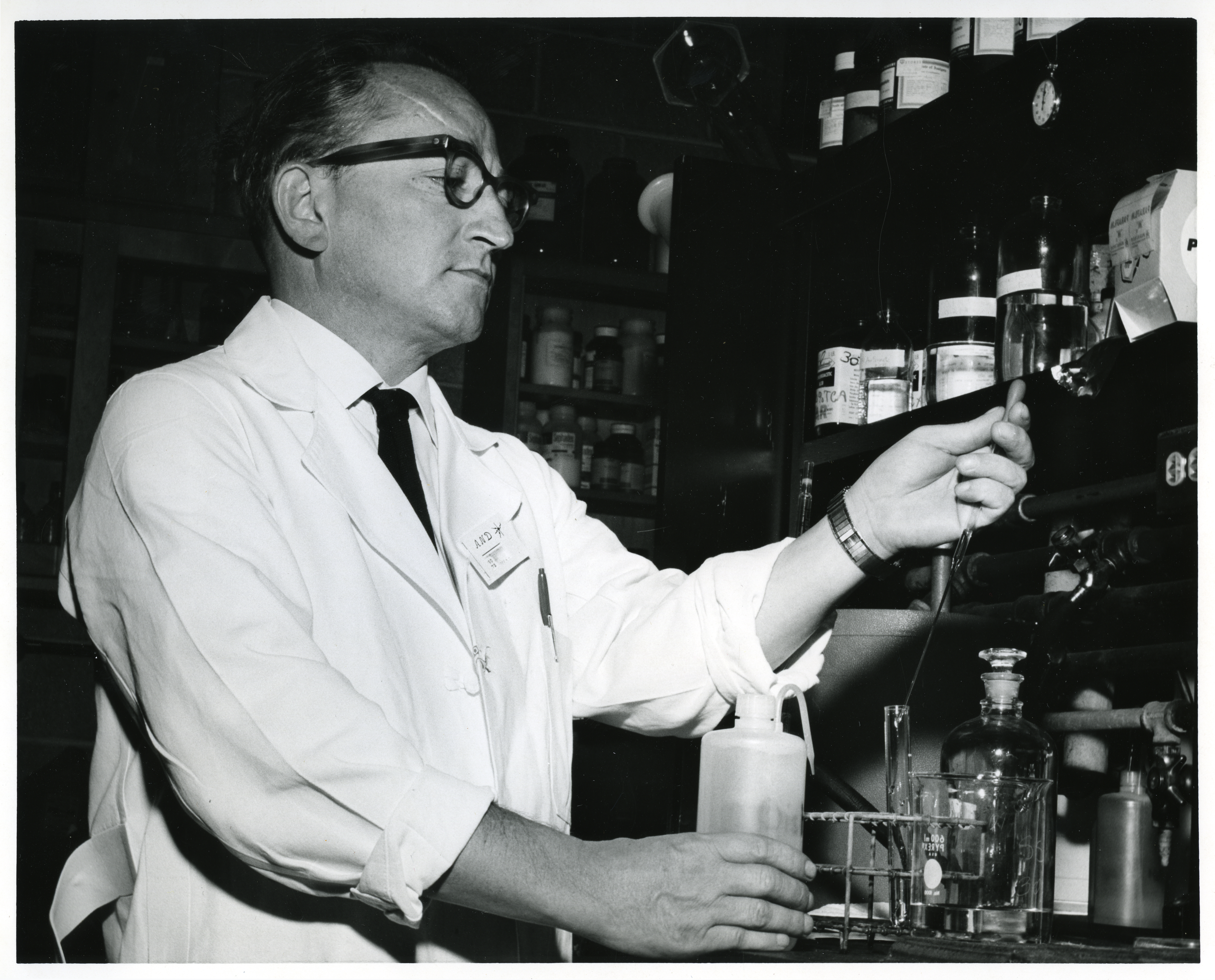
The scientist Sol Spiegelman in his Laboratory ca. 1965

In 1949, Spiegelman joined the faculty at the University of Illinois, where he would spend the next 20 years of his academic career. His research in this time focused on nucleic acids and particularly on the enzymes associated with nucleic acid synthesis, originating from work on bacteriophage with RNA genomes such as MS2 phage and bacteriophage Qβ. His work with Qβ RNA led to a noted experiment with self reproducing RNA structures called Spiegelman's Monster. Among his best-known work is his research on nucleic acid hybridization, much of which was conducted in along with Kim Atwood and Ferruccio Ritossa building on work by Rich and Davies in 1956, which helped to lay the groundwork for advances in recombinant DNA technology.

Spiegelman's later research focused on cancer and in 1969 he moved to the Columbia University College of Physicians and Surgeons, becoming a professor of human genetics and development as well as the directory of the Institute of Cancer Research. He was particularly interested in potential viral causes of cancer. In 1975, he was named University Professor.

== Awards and honors ==
Spiegelman received the Lasker Award in 1974 for his 1965 work on Qβ RNA. In 1981 he received the Antonio Feltrinelli International prize in Biology for his contributions to molecular biology. He was elected to the United States National Academy of Sciences in 1965 American Academy of Arts and Sciences a year later.

== Personal life ==
Spiegelman and his wife Helen had three children. He died of pancreatic cancer in 1983.

== See also ==
- Spiegelman Monster
