= Evgenii Dadonov =

Russian ice hockey player (born 1989)

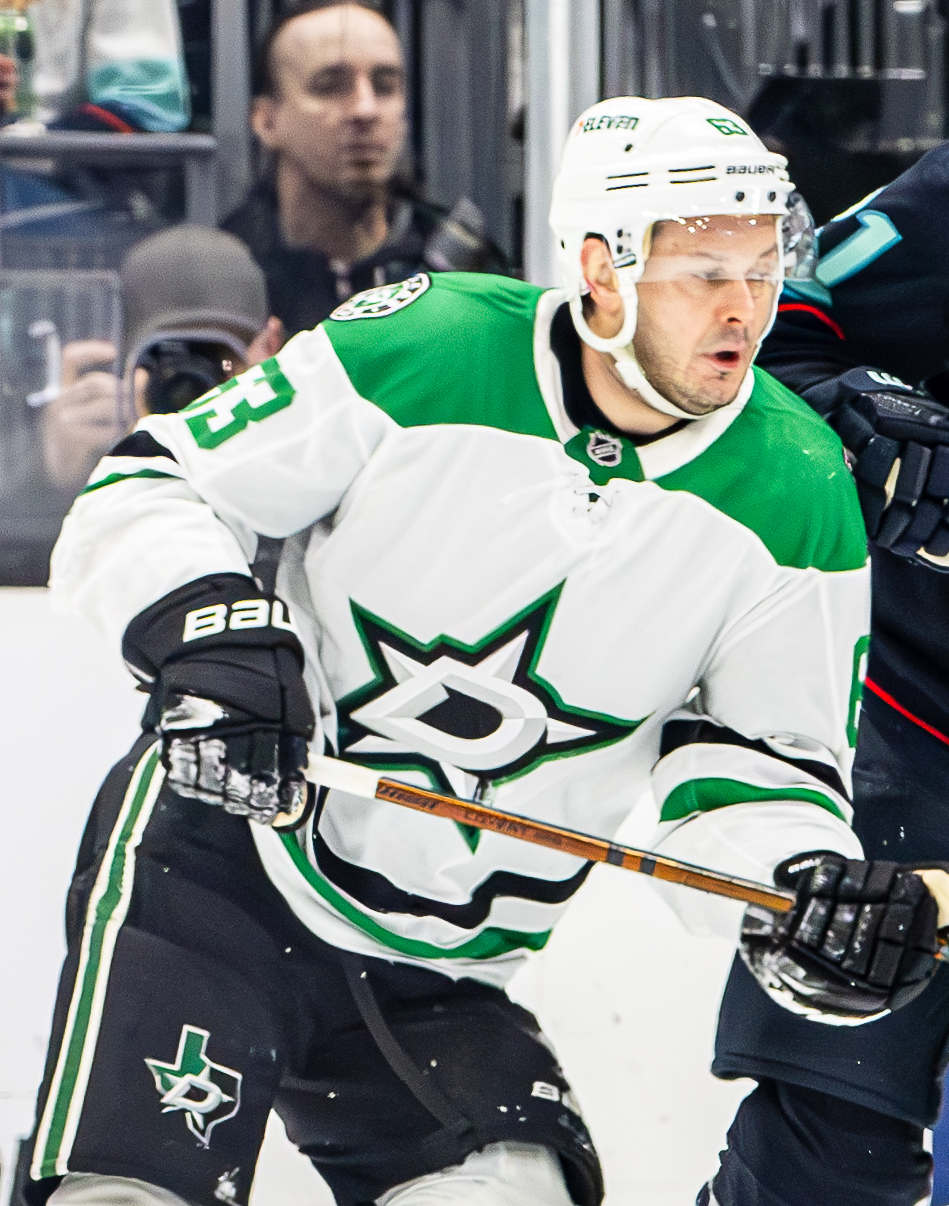
- Dadonov with the Dallas Stars in 2025
- Born: 12 March 1989 (age 37) Chelyabinsk, Russian SFSR, Soviet Union
- Height: 5 ft 10.5 in (179 cm)
- Weight: 185 lb (84 kg; 13 st 3 lb)
- Position: Winger
- Shoots: Left
- KHL team Former teams: Ak Bars Kazan; Traktor Chelyabinsk; Florida Panthers; Donbass Donetsk; SKA Saint Petersburg; Ottawa Senators; Vegas Golden Knights; Montreal Canadiens; Dallas Stars; New Jersey Devils
- National team: Russia
- NHL draft: 71st overall, 2007; Florida Panthers
- Playing career: 2006–present

Yevgeny Anatolyevich Dadonov (Russian: Евгений Анатольевич Дадонов; born 12 March 1989) is a Russian professional ice hockey winger for Ak Bars Kazan of the Kontinental Hockey League (KHL). He previously played in two stints for the Florida Panthers where he was originally selected 71st overall in the 2007 NHL entry draft, as well as the Ottawa Senators, Vegas Golden Knights, Montreal Canadiens, Dallas Stars and New Jersey Devils of the National Hockey League (NHL).

== Playing career ==
Dadonov played for Traktor Chelyabinsk in the Russian Super League and Kontinental Hockey League (KHL). He was drafted 71st overall by the Florida Panthers of the National Hockey League (NHL) in the 2007 NHL entry draft and joined the team in 2009, playing a season with their American Hockey League (AHL) affiliate, the Rochester Americans.

=== North America ===
Dadonov was recalled by the Panthers and made his NHL debut on 6 April 2010 in a 5–2 loss to the Ottawa Senators, though the coach, Peter DeBoer praised his play after the game. He played four games with the Panthers during the 2009–10 season. Returning to Rochester the following season, he was recalled on 7 December 2010 to replace an injured Radek Dvořák. Dadonov scored his first NHL goal on 15 December 2010 against Cam Ward of the Carolina Hurricanes. In January 2011 Dadonov was selected to participate in the 2011 NHL All-Star Game SuperSkills Competition as one of 12 rookies.

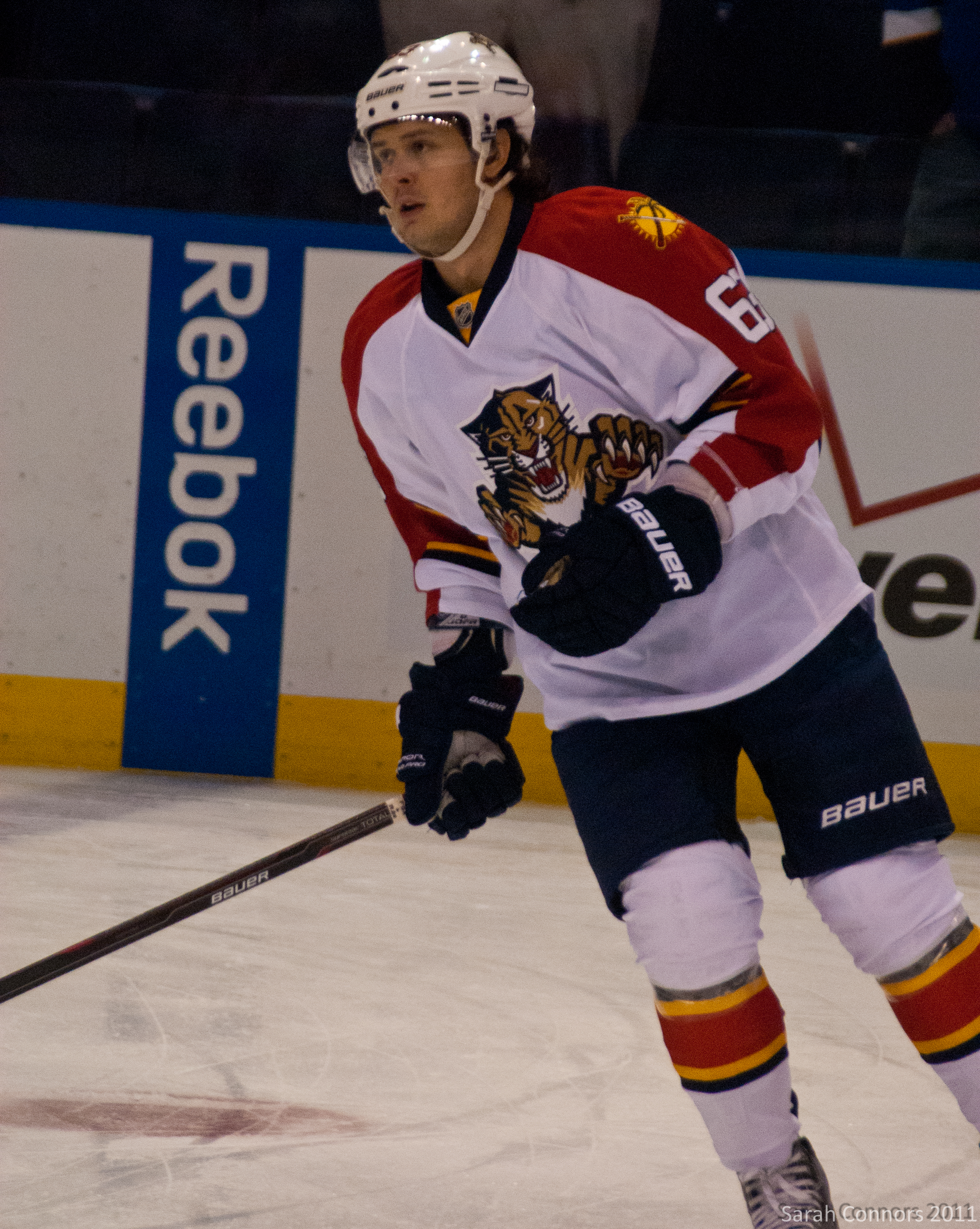
Dadonov with the Florida Panthers in 2011 during his first stint with the team

In the 2011–12 season, the last year of his entry-level contract, after failing to gain a regular position into the Panthers line-up on 18 January 2012, Dadonov was traded, along with A.J. Jenks, by the Panthers to the Carolina Hurricanes in exchange for Jonathan Matsumoto and Mattias Lindstrom. He played 15 games with the Panthers that year, tallying two goals and three points and nine points in 20 games with the Panthers AHL affiliate, the San Antonio Rampage. Dadonov was assigned to the Hurricanes' affiliate, the Charlotte Checkers where he played the remainder of the season out.

=== Donbass ===
On 7 July 2012, Dadonov left the Hurricanes and North America to return to the KHL with Donbass. In December 2013 he signed a three-year extension with the club, and expressed interest in acquiring Ukrainian citizenship. With Donbass, Dadonov won the 2012–13 IIHF Continental Cup, and became the second scoring leader of the tournament. In the 2013–14 KHL season Dadonov helped Donbass reach the Conference Semifinals.

=== SKA Saint Petersburg ===
With HC Donbass suspending operations due to the outbreak of War in Donbass Dadonov signed a multi-year contract with KHL club SKA Saint Petersburg on 11 June 2014. In 2015, Dadonov played a vital role in helping SKA Saint Petersburg to win the Gagarin Cup for the first time. When team captain Ilya Kovalchuk was named Most Valuable Player of the season, he refused to accept it and instead passed the award on to Dadonov. In a later interview, Kovalchuk said that he felt Dadonov deserved the award more. At the end of the season, the KHL named Dadonov one of the two winners of the "Gentleman on Ice" award for his fair play and sportsmanship.

=== Return to Florida Panthers ===
Having evolved and matured his game over the previous five seasons spent in the KHL, Dadonov opted to pursue a return for a second attempt in the NHL. With his rights having expired from the Hurricanes, Dadonov returned to his original club, the Florida Panthers, in agreeing to a three-year, $12 million contract on 1 July 2017. In his final year with the Panthers, he scored 25 goals and 47 points in 69 games but had a disappointing record in the 2020 Stanley Cup playoffs, only registering one point as the Panthers were bounced by the New York Islanders in the first round.

=== Ottawa Senators ===
After three productive seasons with the Panthers, Dadonov left the club as an unrestricted free agent, to sign a three-year, $15 million contract with the Ottawa Senators on 15 October 2020. Dadonov saw his production drop in his first season after signing with the Senators compared to his time in Florida, putting up 20 points in 55 games, under half a point-per-game average. He only spent the 2020–21 season with the Senators before being traded to the Vegas Golden Knights during the subsequent off-season.

=== Vegas Golden Knights ===
After a disappointing first season with the Senators, Dadonov was traded to the Vegas Golden Knights in exchange for Nick Holden and a 2022 third-round draft pick on 28 July 2021. He was acquired by the Golden Knights to provide depth scoring and as a backup should the Golden Knights need to move larger contracts to get under the salary cap.

During the 2021–22 season, the Golden Knights attempted to trade both Dadonov and a conditional second-round pick to the Anaheim Ducks in exchange for John Moore and Ryan Kesler at the NHL trade deadline on 21 March 2022, in order to alleviate salary cap constraints caused by the acquisition of star forward Jack Eichel from the Buffalo Sabres. The deal immediately came into question due to a no-trade clause in Dadonov's contract. A report the same day stated the Golden Knights claimed the Senators did not inform them of the no-trade clause, and the NHL's central registry processed the trade before Dadonov disputed its validity. On 23 March, the trade was officially voided. The controversy led to the NHL announcing plans to change how no-trade clauses were handled in the future.

Dadonov's profile was elevated as a result of the events, and days after the resolution he scored the overtime-winning goal in a 26 March game against the Chicago Blackhawks, receiving strong applause from the home crowd. The final two months of the season were Dadonov's strongest, and he finished with 20 goals and 23 assists. It was widely expected, however, that the Golden Knights would again attempt to trade Dadonov in the offseason.

=== Montreal Canadiens and Dallas Stars ===
Following the Golden Knights missing the postseason for the first time in franchise history, Dadonov was traded to the Montreal Canadiens in exchange for Shea Weber on 16 June 2022. In the final year of his contract, Dadonov began the 2022–23 season in a top-six offensive role. However, he was unable to replicate his previous offensive totals. In 50 regular season games, he registered only 4 goals and 18 points.

On 26 February 2023, Dadonov was traded by the Canadiens, with half his salary retained, to the Dallas Stars in exchange for fellow struggling Russian, Denis Gurianov. Dadonov scored in his debut with the Stars, a 5–4 loss to the Vancouver Canucks. He finished the season with Dallas appearing in 23 games scoring 3 goals and 15 points. In the 2023 Stanley Cup Playoffs, Dadonov elevated his play, registering 10 points in 16 games and helping Dallas get all the way to the Western Conference Finals before being eliminated by the eventual Stanley Cup champions, Vegas Golden Knights.

On 27 June 2023, Dadonov signed a two-year contract extension with the Stars worth $4.5 million. He played in 50 games with Dallas during the 2023–24 season, scoring 12 goals and 23 points before suffering a serious fracture against the Montreal Canadiens on 10 February that kept him out for 29 games. He played in 19 games in the 2024 Stanley Cup playoffs, scoring three goals and seven points.

=== New Jersey Devils ===
Following three seasons with the Stars, Dadonov left as a free agent and extended his NHL career with the New Jersey Devils, signing a one-year, $1 million contract on 1 July 2025.

== Career statistics ==
=== Regular season and playoffs ===
| | | | Regular season | | | | | Playoffs |
| Season | Team | League | GP | G | A | Pts | PIM | GP | G | A | Pts | PIM |
|---|---|---|---|---|---|---|---|---|---|---|---|---|
| 2004–05 | Traktor–2 Chelyabinsk | RUS.3 | 2 | 1 | 0 | 1 | 0 | — | — | — | — | — |
| 2005–06 | Traktor–2 Chelyabinsk | RUS.3 | 20 | 6 | 6 | 12 | 2 | — | — | — | — | — |
| 2005–06 | Traktor Chelyabinsk | RUS.2 | — | — | — | — | — | 1 | 0 | 0 | 0 | 0 |
| 2006–07 | Traktor Chelyabinsk | RSL | 24 | 1 | 1 | 2 | 8 | — | — | — | — | — |
| 2006–07 | Traktor–2 Chelyabinsk | RUS.3 | 4 | 2 | 0 | 2 | 14 | — | — | — | — | — |
| 2007–08 | Traktor Chelyabinsk | RSL | 43 | 7 | 13 | 20 | 20 | 2 | 0 | 0 | 0 | 0 |
| 2007–08 | Traktor–2 Chelyabinsk | RUS.3 | 12 | 4 | 7 | 11 | 32 | — | — | — | — | — |
| 2008–09 | Traktor Chelyabinsk | KHL | 40 | 11 | 4 | 15 | 8 | 3 | 0 | 0 | 0 | 2 |
| 2009–10 | Rochester Americans | AHL | 76 | 17 | 23 | 40 | 36 | 7 | 0 | 1 | 1 | 0 |
| 2009–10 | Florida Panthers | NHL | 4 | 0 | 0 | 0 | 0 | — | — | — | — | — |
| 2010–11 | Rochester Americans | AHL | 24 | 8 | 8 | 16 | 4 | — | — | — | — | — |
| 2010–11 | Florida Panthers | NHL | 36 | 8 | 9 | 17 | 14 | — | — | — | — | — |
| 2011–12 | San Antonio Rampage | AHL | 20 | 5 | 4 | 9 | 4 | — | — | — | — | — |
| 2011–12 | Florida Panthers | NHL | 15 | 2 | 1 | 3 | 2 | — | — | — | — | — |
| 2011–12 | Charlotte Checkers | AHL | 35 | 3 | 16 | 19 | 6 | — | — | — | — | — |
| 2012–13 | Donbass Donetsk | KHL | 52 | 14 | 23 | 37 | 12 | — | — | — | — | — |
| 2013–14 | Donbass Donetsk | KHL | 54 | 15 | 14 | 29 | 24 | 13 | 7 | 4 | 11 | 4 |
| 2014–15 | SKA Saint Petersburg | KHL | 53 | 19 | 27 | 46 | 10 | 22 | 15 | 5 | 20 | 8 |
| 2015–16 | SKA Saint Petersburg | KHL | 59 | 23 | 23 | 46 | 4 | 15 | 3 | 6 | 9 | 2 |
| 2016–17 | SKA Saint Petersburg | KHL | 53 | 30 | 36 | 66 | 39 | 18 | 9 | 10 | 19 | 2 |
| 2017–18 | Florida Panthers | NHL | 74 | 28 | 37 | 65 | 8 | — | — | — | — | — |
| 2018–19 | Florida Panthers | NHL | 82 | 28 | 42 | 70 | 8 | — | — | — | — | — |
| 2019–20 | Florida Panthers | NHL | 69 | 25 | 22 | 47 | 10 | 4 | 0 | 1 | 1 | 2 |
| 2020–21 | Ottawa Senators | NHL | 55 | 13 | 7 | 20 | 4 | — | — | — | — | — |
| 2021–22 | Vegas Golden Knights | NHL | 78 | 20 | 23 | 43 | 18 | — | — | — | — | — |
| 2022–23 | Montreal Canadiens | NHL | 50 | 4 | 14 | 18 | 16 | — | — | — | — | — |
| 2022–23 | Dallas Stars | NHL | 23 | 3 | 12 | 15 | 2 | 16 | 4 | 6 | 10 | 2 |
| 2023–24 | Dallas Stars | NHL | 51 | 12 | 11 | 23 | 8 | 19 | 3 | 4 | 7 | 2 |
| 2024–25 | Dallas Stars | NHL | 80 | 20 | 20 | 40 | 10 | 16 | 1 | 3 | 4 | 2 |
| 2025–26 | New Jersey Devils | NHL | 24 | 1 | 0 | 1 | 2 | — | — | — | — | — |
| KHL totals | | | 311 | 112 | 128 | 240 | 97 | 71 | 34 | 26 | 60 | 18 |
| NHL totals | | | 641 | 164 | 198 | 362 | 102 | 55 | 8 | 14 | 22 | 8 |

Medal record

Men's ice hockey

Representing Russia

World Championships
| Gold medal – first place | 2014 Belarus | |
| Silver medal – second place | 2015 Czech Republic | |
| Bronze medal – third place | 2016 Russia | |
| Bronze medal – third place | 2017 Germany/France | |
| Bronze medal – third place | 2019 Slovakia | |

World Junior Championships
| Bronze medal – third place | 2008 Czech Republic | |
| Bronze medal – third place | 2009 Canada | |

IIHF World U18 Championship
| Gold medal – first place | 2007 Finland | |

=== International ===
| Year | Team | Event | Result | GP | G | A | Pts | PIM |
|---|---|---|---|---|---|---|---|---|
| 2006 | Russia | U18 | 3rd place, bronze medalist(s) | 4 | 4 | 2 | 6 | 0 |
| 2007 | Russia | U18 | 1st place, gold medalist(s) | 7 | 2 | 2 | 4 | 2 |
| 2008 | Russia | WJC | 3rd place, bronze medalist(s) | 7 | 0 | 0 | 0 | 4 |
| 2009 | Russia | WJC | 3rd place, bronze medalist(s) | 7 | 2 | 5 | 7 | 2 |
| 2014 | Russia | WC | 1st place, gold medalist(s) | 10 | 0 | 2 | 2 | 0 |
| 2015 | Russia | WC | 2nd place, silver medalist(s) | 10 | 4 | 7 | 11 | 2 |
| 2016 | Russia | WC | 3rd place, bronze medalist(s) | 10 | 6 | 7 | 13 | 6 |
| 2016 | Russia | WCH | 4th | 4 | 0 | 1 | 1 | 0 |
| 2017 | Russia | WC | 3rd place, bronze medalist(s) | 10 | 3 | 5 | 8 | 0 |
| 2018 | Russia | WC | 6th | 8 | 2 | 5 | 7 | 2 |
| 2019 | Russia | WC | 3rd place, bronze medalist(s) | 10 | 7 | 4 | 11 | 0 |
| Junior totals | | | | 21 | 4 | 7 | 11 | 8 |
| Senior totals | | | | 62 | 22 | 31 | 53 | 10 |

== Awards and honours ==
| Award | Year | Ref |
KHL
| All-Star Game | 2013* | |
| Gagarin Cup champion | 2015, 2017 | |
| Gentleman Award | 2015 | |
