= Francis X. Schumacher =

American forest biometrician (1892–1967)

- Born: March 14, 1892; Dayton, Ohio
- Died: June 3, 1967 (aged 75); Durham, North Carolina
- Education: University of Michigan
- Known for: Introduction of statistical sampling and experimental design to American forestry. Growth & yield modeling
- Awards: Distinguished Service Cross; Barrington Moore Memorial Award in Biological Science, Society of American Foresters
- Scientific career
- Fields: Forestry
- Workplaces: University of California, Berkeley, United States Forest Service, Duke University

Francis X. Schumacher (March 14, 1892 – June 3, 1967) was a prominent forest biometrician. He served on the forestry faculty at The University of California before being called to work as chief of the section forest measurements, U.S. Forest Service. His interest in statistics led him to an affiliation with R.A. Fisher, and Schumacher led early advances to adopt statistical methods in forest inventories and silvicultural research. He joined the faculty of the Duke Graduate School of Forestry as one of its original seven faculty members. He co-authored textbooks on forest mensuration and sampling with other notable forest biometricians Donald Bruce and Roy A. Chapman. He was the first to apply the equation form Y = e^{a+b/X}, widely known as the Schumacher equation, to timber growth and yield modeling.

In 1957, he was elected as a Fellow of the American Statistical Association. Schumacher was named a Fellow, Society of American Foresters in 1959 and was awarded an honorary doctorate from North Carolina State University the same year.
