= Ström (surname) =

Ström is a Swedish surname literally meaning "stream". Notable people with the surname include:

== People ==
- Albin Ström (1892–1962), Swedish socialist politician
- Anders Ström, Swedish cross country skier who competed in the 1928 Winter Olympics
- Carl Ström (1888–1957), Swedish film actor
- Elma Ström (1822–1889), Swedish opera singer
- Eva Ström, Swedish lyricist, novelist, biographer and literary critic
- Frank Ström, Swedish former handball player who competed in the 1972 Summer Olympics
- Fredrik Ström (1880–1948), Swedish Socialist politician and a prolific writer
- Israel af Ström (1778–1856), Swedish forest researcher and founder of Sweden's national Forestry Institute.
- Karin Ström, Swedish singer and writer
- Nikke Ström (1951–2026), Swedish rock musician
- Oscar af Ström (1867–1952), Swedish horse rider who competed in the 1912 Summer Olympics
- Peter Ström, Swedish professional ice hockey right winger
- Stefan Ström (born 1977), Swedish retired boxer
- Staffan Ström (1934–2016), Swedish physicist

== See also ==
- Strøm
