= Strom Lake =

Lake in the state of Minnesota, United States

- Location within Minnesota
- Location: Blue Earth County, Minnesota
- Coordinates: 44°8′38″N 94°21′39″W
- Type: lake

Strom Lake is a lake in Blue Earth County, Minnesota, in the United States.

Strom Lake was named for Andrew Strom, an early settler.
