= David M. Strom =

American physicist and academic

- Born: David Mattill Strom; 1959 (age 66–67)

Academic background
- Education: B.A. in Physics and Mathematics (1980), St. Olaf College; Ph.D. in Physics (1986), University of Wisconsin–Madison
- Thesis: Measurement of the D^{0} lifetime
- Doctoral advisor: Sau Lan Wu

David M. Strom (born around 1959) is an experimental high energy particle physicist on the faculty of the University of Oregon.

== Early life and education ==
Strom was born in Montana in 1957, the son of Kathryn Jean (née Mattill) and Herbert Edward Strom. He was awarded a B.A. in Physics and Mathematics in 1980 at St. Olaf College. He earned a Ph.D. in Physics in 1986 at the University of Wisconsin–Madison, with his dissertation, Measurement of the D^{0} lifetime, advised by Sau Lan Wu.

Strom is married to Katja Heide, and they have two sons.

== Career ==
After earning his Ph.D., Strom was a research associate at Madison for a year. He was a McCormick Fellow at the University of Chicago for two years, and he became a research associate there from 1989 to 1991.

Strom joined the physics faculty at the University of Oregon in 1991. He researches topics in experimental high energy physics, including "Quantum black hole production in proton-proton collisions, Higgs (in beyond the Standard Model Scenarios), triggering at hadron colliders, detectors and electronics for linear colliders, precision electroweak measurements, ATLAS".

From 2001 to 2002, Strom served as a member of the University Senate at the University of Oregon.

In Spring 2011, Strom was elected by the ATLAS Collaboration Board as deputy trigger coordinator for the ATLAS experiment at CERN's Large Hadron Collider. After serving as deputy trigger coordinator, Strom assumed the role of trigger coordinator in late 2011. The University of Oregon's Physics News said, "The ATLAS detector is massive, stretching about 150 feet long and more than 80 feet high. It is about half as big as the Notre Dame Cathedral in Paris and weighs close to 7,000 tons, the same as the Eiffel Tower or a hundred 747 jets."

Eric Tucker reported,

The trigger is a vital component of the ATLAS experiment, an international collaboration involving 2,000 scientists, including a team of UO physicists. Their work seeks to shed light on such scientific enigmas as the origin of mass, extra dimensions of space, black holes and dark matter by smashing together beams of high-energy protons and analyzing the debris. The trigger selects events with potentially interesting interactions from the very large collision event rate (as many as 600 million per second at full power) to arrive at a manageable fraction of the massive amount of data to be recorded... Whether a breakthrough takes place in two years or by the end of the decade, the answers to the ultimate questions have never been so close at hand.

— Eric Tucker, '"Trigger Man"

On 4 July 2012, CERN announced the discovery of the Higgs Boson by the ATLAS and CMS experiments.

== Selected publications ==
Strom has principally participated in research collaborations of ATLAS, Linear Collider physics, BABAR, and OPAL.

=== ATLAS Collaboration ===
- ATLAS Collaboration (September 28, 2017). "Search for new phenomena in dijet events using 37 fb^{−1} of pp collision data collected at s√=13 TeV with the ATLAS detector". Physical Review D. 96 (5) 052004. arXiv:1703.09127. doi:10.1103/PhysRevD.96.052004. ISSN 2470-0010. S2CID 126134103.
- ATLAS Collaboration (March 19, 2016). "Search for New Phenomena in Dijet Mass and Angular Distributions from pp Collisions at s√ = 13 TeV with the ATLAS Detector". Physics Letters B. 754: 302–322. arXiv:1512.01530. doi:10.1016/j.physletb.2016.01.032. S2CID 124307471.
- ATLAS Collaboration (March 5, 2014). "Search for Quantum Black-Hole Production in High-Invariant-Mass Lepton+Jet Final States Using Proton-Proton Collisions at sqrt(s) = 8 TeV and the ATLAS Detector". Physical Review Letters. 112 (9) 091804. arXiv:1311.2006. doi:10.1103/PhysRevLett.112.091804. ISSN 0031-9007. PMID 24655244. S2CID 204934578.
- ATLAS Collaboration (April 21, 2015). "Evidence for the Higgs-boson Yukawa coupling to tau leptons with the ATLAS detector". Journal of High Energy Physics. 2015 (4) 117. arXiv:1501.04943. Bibcode:2015JHEP...04..117A. doi:10.1007/JHEP04(2015)117. ISSN 1029-8479. S2CID 209834985.
- ATLAS Collaboration (October 7, 2013). "Evidence for the spin-0 nature of the Higgs boson using ATLAS data". Physics Letters B. 726 (1–3): 120–144. arXiv:1307.1432. Bibcode:2013PhLB..726..120A. doi:10.1016/j.physletb.2013.08.026. S2CID 11562016.
- ATLAS Collaboration (October 7, 2013). "Measurements of Higgs boson production and couplings in diboson final states with the ATLAS detector at the LHC". Physics Letters B. 726 (1): 88–119. arXiv:1307.1427. Bibcode:2013PhLB..726...88A. doi:10.1016/j.physletb.2013.08.010. hdl:11376/1172. ISSN 0370-2693. S2CID 119254183.
- The ATLAS Collaboration (September 17, 2012). "Observation of a new particle in the search for the Standard Model Higgs boson with the ATLAS detector at the LHC". Physics Letters B. 716 (1): 1–29. arXiv:1207.7214. Bibcode:2012PhLB..716....1A. doi:10.1016/j.physletb.2012.08.020. S2CID 119169617.
- The ATLAS Collaboration (January 3, 2012). "Performance of the ATLAS Trigger System in 2010". The European Physical Journal C. 72 (1) 1849. arXiv:1110.1530. Bibcode:2012EPJC...72.1849A. doi:10.1140/epjc/s10052-011-1849-1. ISSN 1434-6044. S2CID 204936549.

=== Linear Collider ===
- Strom, D.; Frey, R.; Breidenbach, M.; Freytag, D.; Graf, N.; Haller, G.; Milgrome, O.; Radeka, V. (February 1, 2005), "Design and development of a dense, fine grained silicon tungsten calorimeter with integrated electronics", Calorimetry in Particle Physics, WORLD SCIENTIFIC, pp. 10–18, Bibcode:2005cpp..conf...10S, doi:10.1142/9789812701978_0002, ISBN 978-981-256-272-2
- Strom, D.; Frey, R.; Breidenbach, M.; Freytag, D.; Graf, N.; Haller, G.; Milgrome, O.; Radeka, V. (August 15, 2005). "Fine grained silicon-tungsten calorimetry for a linear collider detector". IEEE Transactions on Nuclear Science. 52 (4): 868–873. Bibcode:2005ITNS...52..868S. doi:10.1109/TNS.2005.852689. ISSN 1558-1578. S2CID 5931713.

=== BABAR Collaboration ===
- The BABAR Collaboration (June 23, 2006). "A Search for the rare decay B0 --> tau+tau- at BABAR". Physical Review Letters. 96 (24) 241802. arXiv:hep-ex/0511015. doi:10.1103/PhysRevLett.96.241802. ISSN 0031-9007. PMID 16907230.
- Strom, D.; Frey, R.; Breidenbach, M.; Freytag, D.; Graf, N.; Haller, G.; Milgrome, O.; Radeka, V. (August 15, 2005). "Fine grained silicon-tungsten calorimetry for a linear collider detector". IEEE Transactions on Nuclear Science. 52 (4): 868–873. Bibcode:2005ITNS...52..868S. doi:10.1109/TNS.2005.852689. ISSN 1558-1578. S2CID 5931713.

=== OPAL ===
- The OPAL Collaboration (January 1, 2003). "Study of Z pair production and anomalous couplings in e+e- collisions at sqrt(s) between 190 GeV and 209 GeV". The European Physical Journal C. 32 (3): 303–322. arXiv:hep-ex/0310013. doi:10.1140/epjc/s2003-01467-x. ISSN 1434-6052.
- The OPAL Collaboration (March 1, 2004). "Tests of the standard model and constraints on new physics from measurements of fermion-pair production at 189-209 GeV at LEP". The European Physical Journal C. 33 (2): 173–212. arXiv:hep-ex/0309053. Bibcode:2004EPJC...33..173O. doi:10.1140/epjc/s2004-01595-9. ISSN 1434-6052. S2CID 16463072.
- The OPAL Collaboration (March 1, 2001). "Precise determination of the Z resonance parameters at LEP: "Zedometry"". The European Physical Journal C. 19 (4): 587–651. arXiv:hep-ex/0012018. Bibcode:2001EPJC...19..587O. doi:10.1007/s100520100627. ISSN 1434-6052.
- The OPAL Collaboration (June 1, 2000). "Precision luminosity for Z^{0} lineshape measurements with a silicon-tungsten calorimeter". The European Physical Journal C. 14 (3): 373–425. arXiv:hep-ex/9910066. Bibcode:2000EPJC...14..373O. doi:10.1007/s100520000353. ISSN 1434-6052. S2CID 119010221.
- Strom, David (May 24, 2001). "Electroweak Measurements on the Z Resonance". arXiv:hep-ex/0105076.

== Awards, honors ==
In 2017 Strom was elected a Fellow of the American Physical Society, cited "for leadership on the ATLAS experiment, particularly related to trigger and data acquisition, and for contributions to the ATLAS physics outcomes, including the discovery of the Higgs boson".
