= Mark Strom =

American basketball player

Mark Eugene Strom (born June 4, 1982, in Salem, Oregon, United States) is an American professional basketball player. He is a 6-foot-3-inch (191 cm) guard who plays in the Liga Nacional de Baloncesto Profesional in Mexico.

Strom was a standout player at Mazama High School in Klamath Falls, Oregon. He played at Umpqua Community College for two years, where he was named second-team all-NWAACC, then transferred to San Jose Christian College, where he was first-team all-USCAA. After college, he played professionally in Mexico for the Bucaneros de Campeche, Santos de San Luis, Ángeles de Puebla and Cosmos De Tijuana of the Liga Nacional de Baloncesto Profesional (LNBP).

In 2009 he led Gonyeli OŞAN to the Super Cup Finals in the North Cyprus Premier League. He was averaged 19.3 points and 4 assists per match.

He then returned to Mexico to play a season with the Pioneros de Los Mochis of the CIBACOPA.
