= Lindstrom House =

Coordinates: 47.6466°N 122.5702°W

The Lindstrom House is an American Institute of Architects award-winning single family residence in Bainbridge Island, Washington. It was built by Richard D. Lindstrom (Morgan and Lindstrom) in 1978 for himself and his family. Lindstrom received the 1979 American Institute of Architects Honors Award for this house, one of only two residential structures that year to receive this distinction. Over the years, the house has been recognized in numerous publications for both the trade and general public.

The house was inspired by the Ise Grand Shrine near Nara, Japan, as well as Native American longhouses of the Northwest Coast. It was remodeled, updated and expanded in 2007.
