= Adriano Buzzati-Traverso =

Italian geneticist (1913–1983)

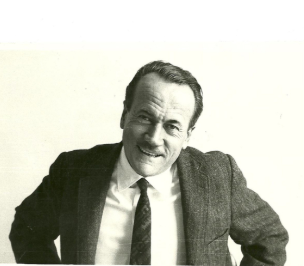
- Adriano Buzzati-Traverso
- Born: 6 April 1913; Milan, Italy
- Died: 22 April 1983 (aged 70); Milan
- Scientific career
- Fields: Genetics

Adriano Buzzati-Traverso (6 April 1913, Milan, Italy – 22 April 1983) was an Italian geneticist. He was the brother of the well-known writer Dino Buzzati. He studied X-ray induced mutations, evolutionary and population genetics. In 1962 he founded in Naples the Laboratorio Internazionale di Genetica e Biofisica (International Laboratory of Genetics and Biophysics) which helped advance biological research in Italy and wrote several influential books on genetics.

Buzzati was born in Milan, the son of Giulio Cesare (d. 1920), a professor of law at the University of Pavia. The family came family from northeastern Italy with roots in Budapest. The family villa in Belluno was well stocked with books and Buzzati was influenced by scholarship at an early age. He studied at the University of Milan before going to the University of Iowa to study population genetics under Ernest W. Lindstrom. In 1914 he worked at the Institute of Hydrobiology at Pallanza. In 1938 he went to Berlin where he collaborated with Timofeev-Resskovsky. He examined X-ray induced mutations in Drosophila. In 1948 he became a professor of genetics at the University of Pavia. In 1950 he wrote a critique of Italian science noting that more money was spent on building the walls of institutes and laboratories than on scientists. He served as a professor at the Scripps Institution of Oceanography from 1952 to 1959 after which he moved to the University of Pavia where he worked until 1969.

The fly Drosophila buzzatii is named after him.
