= Strøm =

Strøm is a surname of Norwegian and Danish origin. Notable people with the name include:

- Anna Odine Strøm (born 1998), Norwegian ski jumper
- Anne-Karine Strøm (born 1951), Norwegian singer
- Arne Torolf Strøm (1901–1972), Norwegian politician
- Axel Strøm (1901–1985), Norwegian physician
- Birgit Strøm (1931–2007), Norwegian actress and puppeteer
- Bjarne Aagaard Strøm (1920–2008), Norwegian politician
- Bjørn Strøm (born 1982), Norwegian footballer
- Boye Strøm (1847–1930), Norwegian statistician and civil servant
- Christian Strøm (born 1947), Norwegian luger
- Einar Strøm (gymnast) (1885–1964), Norwegian artistic gymnast
- Einar Strøm (politician) (born 1945), Norwegian politician
- Ferdinand Strøm (1903–1990), Norwegian dentist
- Halfdan Strøm (1863–1949), Norwegian painter
- Hans Strøm (1726–1797), Norwegian clergyman
- Harald Strøm (1897–1977), Norwegian footballer and speed skater (1897-1977)
- Hilde Fålun Strøm, Explorer, polar ambassador and citizen scientist
- Hilmar Martinus Strøm (1817–1897), Norwegian politician
- Ingilín D. Strøm (born 1991), Faroese politician
- Jan-Axel Strøm (born 1945), Norwegian luger
- Jon Rune Strøm (born 1985), Norwegian jazz musician
- Julian Strøm (1901–1992), Norwegian actor
- Kaare Strøm (athlete) (1915–1982), Norwegian athletics competitor
- Kaare Strøm (limnologist) (1902–1967), Norwegian limnologist
- Kaare Strøm (political scientist) (born 1953), Norwegian political scientist
- Knut Strøm (1923–2007), Norwegian military officer
- Knut Strøm (handballer), Norwegian handball player
- Kristian Strøm (1892–1980), Norwegian speed skater
- Mikael Strøm (born 1959), Danish handball player
- Olav Strøm (1866–1963), Norwegian trade unionist
- Roger Strøm (born 1966), Norwegian speed skater
- Rolf Greger Strøm (1940–1994), Norwegian luger
- Sivert Christensen Strøm (1819–1902), Norwegian jurist and politician
- Steinar Strøm (born 1942), Norwegian economist
- Tarjei Strøm (born 1978), Musical artist
- Tonje Strøm (1937–2010), Norwegian artist
- Tor-Arne Strøm (born 1952), Norwegian politician
- Vegard Strøm (born 1972), Norwegian footballer
- Villiam Strøm (born 1990), Norwegian ice hockey player

== See also ==
- Ström (surname)
