= Istituto di Genetica e Biofisica =

Italian research institute

Coordinates: 40°51′16.7″N 14°13′29.9″E

The Istituto di Genetica e Biofisica (IGB) (Institute of Genetics and Biophysics) is an integral part of the institutes of the Italian Consiglio Nazionale delle Ricerche (National Research Council). It was founded in 1962 in Naples by the Italian geneticist Adriano Buzzati-Traverso and called Laboratorio Internazionale di Genetica e Biofisica (LIGB) (International Laboratory of Genetics and Biophysics). In 1968 the Laboratory came under the full control of the Consiglio Nazionale delle Ricerche, changing its name to the Istituto Internazionale di Genetica e Biofisica (IIGB) (International Institute of Genetics and Biophysics). Successively it assumed its present name of Istituto di Genetica e Biofisica.
