= Lindström (company) =

Textile rental service company

Lindström Group
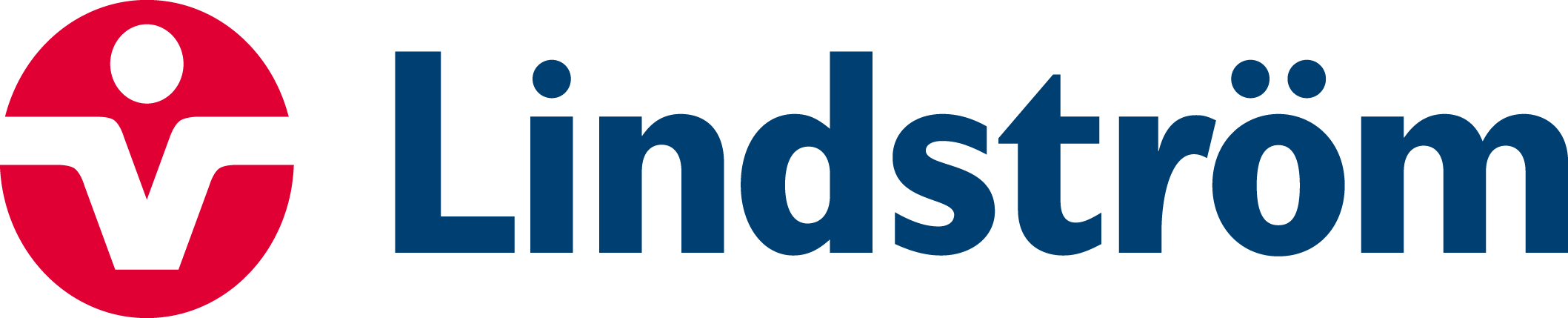
- Type: Private
- Industry: Textile rental service
- Founded: 1848; 178 years ago in Helsinki, Finland
- Founder: Carl August Lindström
- Headquarters: Helsinki, Finland
- Area served: Europe, Asia
- Key people: Juha Laurio, President & CEO
- Revenue: EUR 518.1 million (2024)
- Number of employees: 4,900 (2024)
- Subsidiaries: Comforta Oy
- Website: lindstromgroup.com

Lindström Group is a textile rental service company in Europe and Asia. Lindström operates in 24 countries and with around 4,900 employees. The company headquarters are in Helsinki, Finland. Lindström was established in 1848.

== History ==
Lindström was founded by Carl August Lindström in 1848 in Helsinki. The company was originally in the textile dye house and it was called C. A. Lindström & Son. In 1891, Carl August Lindström handed the company over to his son, W. E. Lindström. In 1918, it was turned into a joint stock company and the name was changed to AB W. E. Lindström Oy.

In the 1920s, the Lindström family sold their shares to the Roiha family who maintain ownership and control over the company today. In the 1930s, the company focused on the textile dye and laundry business. However, in the 1940s, the company experienced major setbacks during and after the Winter War and the Continuation War when demand for industrial laundry services dropped due to a shortage of textile products. In response, Lindström began offering laundry services to consumers in the 1950s and also started investing in and focusing on textile rental services.

In the 1960s, Lindström actively marketed its textile rental services to companies as a potential source of future earnings. In 1974, Lindström bought its biggest competitor in the textile industry, market leader Lainatekstiili Oy from Tampella Oy. However, demand for consumer laundry services plummeted in the early 1970s due to the popularity of home washing machines. In response, Lindström shifted its focus to cleaning services and bought Laite-Siivous Oy in 1975. The company also began renting mats and mops in 1971. In 1976, Lindström closed its unprofitable textile dye unit.

Through acquisitions, Lindström Oy evolved into a holding company. After the mid-1970s, Lindström Group decided to focus on the development of the Lindström brand and began marketing many of its businesses jointly under the Lindström name.

In the 1980s, Lindström was involved in several mergers and acquisitions, mostly as the buyer. However, it also sold some companies that had turned out to be unprofitable.

In the 1990s, Lindström gave up its cleaning and waste management services and laundry shops to focus solely on textile rental services. The company also pursued an aggressive international expansion strategy, starting in Estonia in 1992 and expanding to several European countries.

In 2006, Lindström launched its Asian operations in Suzhou, China and in 2007 the company established a subsidiary in India. As of 2026, Lindström operates in 24 countries in Europe and Asia.

In 2024, the company's revenue was 518 million euros. It has over 100,000 customers globally.

== Services ==
Lindström offers workwear, mat, hotel textile, washroom, industrial wiper, restaurant textile and personal protective equipment services.

== International operations ==
Lindström operates in 24 countries including:

- Austria
- Bulgaria
- China
- Croatia
- Czech Republic
- Estonia
- Finland
- Germany
- Hungary
- India
- Kazakhstan
- Latvia
- Lithuania
- Poland
- Romania
- Serbia
- Slovakia
- Slovenia
- South Korea
- Sweden
- Türkiye
- Ukraine
- United Kingdom
- Vietnam
