= Knut Strøm =

Norwegian military officer (1923–2007)

- Born: 25 January 1923; Ullensaker Municipality
- Died: 10 September 2007 (aged 84); Voss Municipality
- Spouse: Mari Gjukastein (married 2001)
- Relatives: Inger Strøm Wilson (daughter); Rolf Strøm (son)
- Military career
- Allegiance: Norway
- Branch: Norwegian Army
- Rank: Lieutenant colonel
- Awards: Order of the British Empire

Knut Strøm (25 January 1923 – 10 September 2007) was a Norwegian resistance fighter and lieutenant colonel in the Norwegian army. He participated in the resistance work during World War II as an agent in the clandestine intelligence organisation XU. Knut Strøm was a platoon leader in the tysklandbrigaden (Germany brigade) in 1948

before he in 1949 started serving in Hans Majestet Kongens Garde (the Norwegian Royal Guards). In 1969 Knut Strøm was awarded an MBE-medal by the British ambassador Bernsley for his many years of service in exercise Hardfall.
