= Mattias Lindström (ice hockey) =

Swedish ice hockey player (born 1991)

- Born: March 21, 1991 (age 35) Luleå, Sweden
- Height: 6 ft 3 in (191 cm)
- Weight: 212 lb (96 kg; 15 st 2 lb)
- Position: Left wing
- Shoots: Left
- Div.2 team Former teams: Clemensnäs HC; Skellefteå AIK
- NHL draft: 88th overall, 2009; Carolina Hurricanes
- Playing career: 2008–present

Mattias Lindström (born March 21, 1991) is a Swedish ice hockey player. He is currently playing with Clemensnäs HC of the Division 2. Lindstrom was drafted 88th overall in the 2009 NHL entry draft by the Carolina Hurricanes.

== Playing career ==
In 2009-10, Lindström only played one game with Skellefteå's junior team as he suffered a knee injury during team practice. The injury was so serious that it required surgery and forced him to focus on rehabilitation for the rest of the season.

On January 18, 2012, Lindström was traded by the Hurricanes to the Florida Panthers, along with Jonathan Matsumoto, in exchange for Evgenii Dadonov and A.J. Jenks.

Lindström made his North American debut the following season, playing with the Panthers' secondary affiliate, the Cincinnati Cyclones of the ECHL for the duration of the 2012-13 ECHL season. In the final year of his NHL contract with the Panthers, his season was wiped out as he was unable to play with a hip injury.

On July 10, 2014, Lindström returned as a free agent to Sweden, signing a one-year deal with the ambition to re-establish his professional career with Piteå HC of the Hockeyettan.

== Career statistics ==
=== Regular season and playoffs ===
			Regular season					Playoffs
Season	Team	League	GP	G	A	Pts	PIM	GP	G	A	Pts	PIM
2007–08	Skellefteå J20	J20	21	5	1	6	40	—	—	—	—	—
2008–09	Skellefteå AIK	SEL	7	1	0	1	0	7	1	0	1	0
2008–09	Skellefteå J20	J20	31	8	5	13	46	5	2	0	2	0
2009–10	Skellefteå J20	J20	1	0	0	0	0	—	—	—	—	—
2010–11	Skellefteå J20	J20	28	3	8	11	38	5	0	2	2	4
2010–11	Skellefteå AIK	SEL	11	0	0	0	2	9	0	0	0	0
2010–11	Bodens HF	Div.1	2	0	0	0	2	—	—	—	—	—
2011–12	Tingsryds AIF	Allsv	34	0	3	3	16	—	—	—	—	—
2012–13	Cincinnati Cyclones	ECHL	49	4	9	13	54	13	0	1	1	8
2014–15	Piteå HC	Div.1	30	2	2	4	78	4	0	0	0	0
2017–18	Clemensnäs HC	Div.2	26	22	23	45	24	—	—	—	—	—
SHL totals			18	1	0	1	2	16	1	0	1	0

=== International ===
Year	Team	Event	Result	GP	G	A	Pts	PIM
2009	Sweden	WJC18	5th	6	0	0	0	4
Junior totals				6	0	0	0	4
