= Ernest W. Lindstrom =

Ernest Walter Lindstrom (February 5, 1891 – November 8, 1948) was an American geneticist and a professor at the Iowa State College. He worked on the genetics and breeding of maize.

Lindstrom was born to Swedish immigrants in Chicago. After studying at Lake View High School he went to Colorado College in 1910 and majored in biology. He spent some time as a student forester in the Rockies. He spent the last year at the University of Wisconsin and received a degree in 1914. He went to work with R. A. Emerson at the University of Nebraska and followed him when he moved to Cornell University. He defended a PhD thesis on Chlorophyll inheritance in maize in 1917. During World War I he served as a second lieutenant in the Army Air Service and flew a bomber in France. He became an instructor in genetics at the University of Wisconsin and then was appointed assistant professor. He then joined Iowa State College to establish a department of genetics in 1922 and began to work on maize genetics. He also recruited A. Cornelia Anderson who he married in 1921. He worked there for the next 25 years serving as vice dean from 1936 to 1948. He worked on mapping the chromosome of maize and examined quantitative inheritance in tomato polyploidy. In 1944-45 he helped the Colombian government establish a genetics department at the National University of Medellin.
