= Israel af Ström =

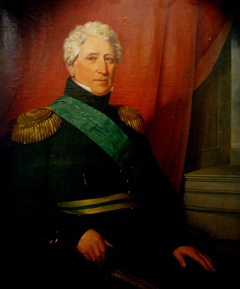
Israel af Ström

Israel af Ström (5 September 1778 – 24 October 1856) was a Swedish botanist and forestry researcher. He introduced systematic forest management in Sweden and initiated the founding the Swedish National Forest Institute.

== Biography ==
Israel Adolf Ström was born in Stockholm, Sweden. He was the son of Erland Ström (1736 – 1806) and his wife Juliana Schröder (1752 – 1833). His father was the inspector for the Royal Djurgården. He was enrolled at Uppsala University in 1789.

Between 1820 and 1850 he was curator of the Royal Djurgården. In 1828, Israel af Ström initiated the founding the National Forest Institute (Skogsinstitutet) which in 1915 was made into a college (Skogshögskolan) and in 1977 became part of the Swedish University of Agricultural Sciences. He was elected in 1838 as member of the Royal Swedish Academy of Sciences.

Ström wrote the main textbook about forestry in Sweden entitled Förslag till en Förbättrad Skogshushållning i Sverige (1822). It was the only Swedish book on the subject for over 100 years.

== See also ==
- Royal Swedish Academy of Agriculture and Forestry

== Other sources ==
- Sverdrup, H.; Stjernquist, Ingrid (2013). Developing Principles and Models for Sustainable Forestry in Sweden. Springer Science & Business Media. ISBN 978-94-015-9888-0.
