= Calcium supplement =

Dietary mineral supplement

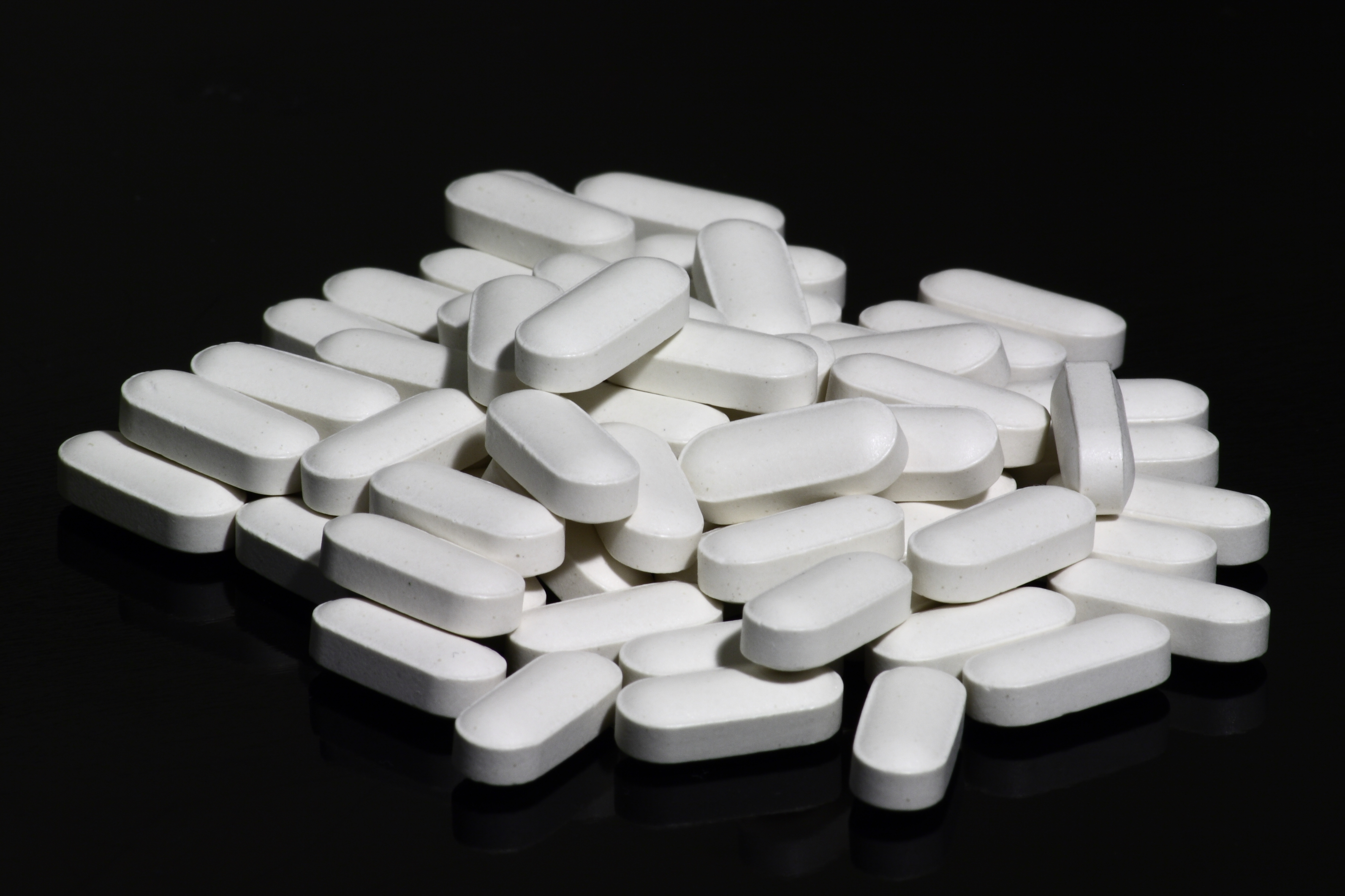
- 500 milligram calcium supplements made from calcium carbonate

Clinical data
- Trade names: Alka-Mints, Calcet, Tums, others
- AHFS/Drugs.com: Monograph
- License data: US DailyMed: Calcium
- Routes of administration: By mouth, intravenous
- ATC code: A12AA (WHO)

Identifiers
- CAS Number: 543-90-8
- ChemSpider: none
- UNII: 95KC50Z1L0

Calcium supplements are salts of calcium used in a number of conditions. Supplementation is generally only required when there is not enough calcium in the diet. By mouth they are used to treat and prevent low blood calcium, osteoporosis, and rickets. By injection into a vein they are used for low blood calcium that is resulting in muscle spasms and for high blood potassium or magnesium toxicity.

Common side effects include constipation and nausea. When taken by mouth high blood calcium is uncommon. Calcium supplements, unlike calcium from dietary sources, appear to increase the risk of kidney stones. Adults generally require about a gram of calcium a day. Calcium is particularly important for bones, muscles, and nerves.

The medical use of calcium supplements began in the 19th century. It is on the World Health Organization's List of Essential Medicines. It is available as a generic medication. In 2023, it was the 200th most commonly prescribed medication in the United States, with more than 2 million prescriptions. Versions are also sold together with vitamin D. In 2023, the combination, calcium/vitamin D was the 261st most commonly prescribed medication in the United States, with more than 1 million prescriptions.

== Health effects ==
=== Bone health ===
Calcium supplementation has no beneficial effect in preventing fractures and falls.

In healthy people, calcium supplementation is not necessary for maintaining bone mineral density, and carries risks that outweigh any benefits. Calcium intake is not significantly associated with hip fracture risk in either men or women. The US Preventive Service Task Force recommends against a daily supplement of less than 1,000 mg of calcium or less than 400 IU of vitamin D for postmenopausal women. Although a slight increase in bone mineral density occurred in healthy children from calcium supplementation, using additional dietary calcium is not justified, according to a 2006 review.

=== Cardiovascular impact ===
There is good evidence that 1,000 mg to 1,500 mg of daily calcium supplementation can effect a modest reduction in blood pressure in adults who do not have a blood pressure condition, suggesting that achieving adequate calcium levels may have a role in preventing high blood pressure.

=== Cancer ===
The US National Cancer Institute does not recommend the use of calcium supplements for lowering the risk of cancer. There is weak evidence calcium supplementation might have a preventative effect against developing colorectal adenomatous polyps, but the evidence is not sufficient to recommend such supplementation.

== Side effects ==
Excessive consumption of calcium carbonate antacids/dietary supplements (such as Tums) over a period of weeks or months can cause milk-alkali syndrome, with symptoms ranging from hypercalcemia to potentially fatal kidney failure. What constitutes "excessive" consumption is not well known and, it is presumed, varies a great deal from person to person. Persons consuming more than 10 grams/day of calcium carbonate (4 grams of elemental calcium) are at risk of developing milk-alkali syndrome, but the condition has been reported in at least one person consuming only 2.5 grams/day of calcium carbonate (1 gram of elemental calcium), an amount usually considered moderate and safe. Some individuals report gastrointestinal side effects such as bloating, constipation, or nausea when taking synthetic calcium supplements.

A 2023 systematic review found that calcium supplementation is not associated with myocardial infarction, stroke, heart failure admission, and cardiovascular/all-cause mortality. Calcium supplements may contribute to the development of kidney stones.

Acute calcium poisoning is rare, and difficult to achieve without administering calcium intravenously. For example, the oral median lethal dose (LD^{50}) for rats for calcium carbonate and calcium chloride are 6.45 and 1.4 g/kg, respectively.

== Interactions ==
Calcium supplements by mouth diminish the absorption of thyroxine when taken within four to six hours of each other. Thus, people taking both calcium and thyroxine run the risk of inadequate thyroid hormone replacement and thence hypothyroidism if they take them simultaneously or near-simultaneously, because significant amount of T4 is adsorbed to calcium carbonate depending on gastric pH levels, preventing absorption of T4 at the intestinal level.

== Absorption ==
Calcium absorption in the gut is influenced by factors such as vitamin D levels, gut acidity, age, estrogen levels, and dietary fiber intake. It decreases with age, low vitamin D levels, hypochlorhydria, low estrogen levels, and a high-fiber diet. Calcium is absorbed both actively and passively in the small intestines, with low vitamin D levels impairing active absorption. Calcium absorption varies with serum 25-hydroxyvitamin D [25(OH)D] levels and is also influenced by dietary factors and genetics. Individuals vary in their ability to absorb calcium, with absorption inversely related to total dietary calcium intake, dietary fiber, alcohol intake, and physical activity, and positively associated with body mass index, dietary fat intake, and serum 1,25(OH2)D and parathyroid hormone levels.

== Excretion ==
Calcium is excreted from the human body primarily through urine and feces. Several factors can influence the rate of urinary calcium loss, including the intake of caffeine, protein, and sodium and low estrogen levels. Caffeine intake has been associated with bone loss, particularly in women aged 66-77 years. Women consuming more than 300 mg of caffeine per day usually experience greater bone loss in the spine than those consuming less than or equal to 300 mg per day. Genetic variants of the Vitamin D Receptor (VDR) also play a role.

== Types ==
The intravenous formulations of calcium include calcium chloride and calcium gluconate. The forms that are taken by mouth include calcium acetate, calcium carbonate, calcium citrate, calcium gluconate, calcium lactate, and calcium phosphate.

- The absorption of calcium from most food and commonly used dietary supplements is very similar. This is contrary to what many calcium supplement manufacturers claim in their promotional materials. The studies of absorption of two most common salts, calcium carbonate and calcium citrate, show varied results. Both were found to be equally bioavailable in most vitamin D–sufficient postmenopausal women and when taken with a meal. Calcium citrate showed better bioavailability in some postmenopausal women, possibly due to low gastric acid output in those women. Calcium citrate is recommended for patients with achlorhydria and those on medications that decrease stomach acidity. While calcium carbonate is the most common and least expensive form of calcium and contains 40% of elemental calcium, calcium citrate supplements contain only 21% calcium, requiring more tablets for equivalent dosage. Calcium carbonate is a recommended supplement which is well-absorbed when taken with a meal and provides greater amounts of elemental calcium, but calcium citrate is preferred in individuals with suspected achlorhydria or absorption disorders.
- Bovine milk naturally contains about 1200 milligrams of elemental calcium per liter, primarily as a calcium phosphate, in concentrations much more than the solubility of calcium phosphate salts. To improve absorption of calcium phosphate, some of the calcium in milk is complexed with citrate, but the most significant component in this process is the presence of casein micelles, which are protein-based colloids in bovine milk that contain about 70% of total calcium and 50% of total inorganic phosphate. The calcium phosphate is encapsulated in the casein micelles in the form of small nanoclusters, which can be considered protein-based carriers for calcium phosphate. The calcium phosphate in the casein micelles is in an amorphous form and solubilizes when the pH is reduced; at pH less than 5, all calcium phosphate in milk is solubilized; under gastric conditions for humans, casein micelles are susceptible to enzymatic coagulation, leading to gastric curds and the subsequent phased transit of the casein fraction through the stomach. The bioavailability of calcium from bovine milk is about 30 to 35% and is not affected by the method of labeling, lactose content, or fermentation.
- Different kinds of beverages such as juices or soy milk boosted with calcium are widely available and provide a convenient way to increase calcium intake. They are particularly beneficial for individuals who have difficulty swallowing large tablets, as well as children, vegans, and those with dairy allergies or intolerances. However, the bioavailability of calcium from these fortified foods can vary significantly. The form of the calcium may not be the primary determinant of absorbability. Instead, the physical state of the calcium, which can precipitate out and settle to the bottom of the container depending on the fortification system, may play a more significant role; despite the convenience of calcium-fortified beverages, the absorption of calcium from these products may not be equivalent to that from milk or other traditional sources.
- Calcium carbonate is the most common and least expensive calcium supplement. It should be taken with food, and depends on low pH levels (acidic) for proper absorption in the intestine. Absorption of calcium from calcium carbonate is similar to the absorption of calcium from milk. Calcium carbonate as a calcium supplement source has several benefits compared to other forms like calcium citrate, lactate, or gluconate, because of highest content of elemental calcium by weight (40%), providing more calcium per dose compared to other forms. It is the least expensive form of calcium, making it a cost-effective choice for many patients. It is well-absorbed when taken with a meal. While it requires more stomach acid for absorption compared to calcium citrate, it is often recommended for individuals with normal to high stomach acid levels.
- Calcium phosphate costs more than calcium carbonate, but less than calcium citrate. Microcrystalline hydroxyapatite and ossein-hydroxyapatite are forms of calcium phosphate used as a dietary supplement.
- Bone meal as a calcium supplementation has largely been discontinued due to concerns of contamination with heavy metals such as lead, arsenic, mercury, and cadmium identified in the 1980s. Microcrystalline hydroxyapatite, a "second-generation" calcium supplement derived from bovine bone, is claimed by manufacturers to be free of these heavy metals. This supplement comprises an organic component, including collagen and bone-specific growth peptides, and an inorganic component providing calcium and phosphorus. These components are claimed to be beneficial for bone health. There is insufficient research on this form of calcium and no solid evidence to recommend using microcrystalline hydroxyapatite as a form of calcium supplementation. There are many other forms of calcium that are free of contaminants and have been shown to be well absorbed and efficacious. There are no reliable studies to validate the claims made about microcrystalline hydroxyapatite and to compare its efficacy with other forms of calcium supplementation. Ossein-hydroxyapatite and microcrystalline hydroxyapatite, both derived from natural sources such as bovine bone, contain approximately 20-25% elemental calcium by weight. Ossein-hydroxyapatite is a composite of collagen protein (ossein) and hydroxyapatite. Ossein-hydroxyapatite exhibits high stability and is less soluble in water compared to other calcium compounds. Microcrystalline hydroxyapatite is extracted from bovine bone and contains the mineral matrix found in human bones. Apart from calcium, microcrystalline hydroxyapatite contains other essential minerals like phosphorus, magnesium, and trace elements.
- Antacids frequently contain calcium carbonate, and are a commonly used, inexpensive calcium supplement.
- Coral calcium is a salt of calcium derived from fossilized coral reefs. Coral calcium is composed of calcium carbonate and trace minerals. Claims for health benefits unique to coral calcium have been discredited. Coral calcium, marketed as a cure for various diseases and linked to Okinawan longevity, is merely calcium carbonate, and it supposed superiority to regular calcium carbonate has not been proven. The Okinawa Centenarian Study (OCS) in 2003 clarified that Okinawan longevity is due to a healthy lifestyle, not coral calcium. The OCS did not endorse coral calcium due to its cost, lack of scientific evidence supporting health claims, and environmental concerns about coral reefs. In 2004, the Federal Trade Commission prohibited the marketers from making unsupported health claims about coral calcium.
- Calcium citrate can be taken without food and is the supplement of choice for individuals with achlorhydria or who are taking histamine-2 blockers or proton-pump inhibitors. Calcium citrate is about 21% elemental calcium. One thousand mg will provide 210 mg of calcium. It is more expensive than calcium carbonate and more of it must be taken to get the same amount of calcium. Calcium citrate as a calcium supplement source has several benefits compared to other forms like calcium carbonate, because calcium citrate does not require an acidic environment for absorption, making it a good choice for individuals with low stomach acid, such as the elderly or those on certain medications. It is meal-independent, that meant that it can be taken with or without food, offering more flexibility than calcium carbonate, which is best taken with food. Calcium citrate is a better choice for individuals taking medications for gastroesophageal reflux disease, as these medications can reduce stomach acid and impair calcium carbonate absorption.
- Calcium lactate has similar absorption as calcium carbonate, but is more expensive. Unlike calcium carbonate, calcium lactate can be absorbed at various pHs, thus it does not need to be taken with food. Calcium lactate is a less concentrated forms of calcium than calcium carbonate. Calcium lactate contains 13% elemental calcium. It is often used as a food additive to enhance the calcium content of foods, replace other salts, or increase the overall pH (that is, decrease the acidity) of the food. It can also be used as a main source of calcium in calcium supplements, however due to its lower concentration of elemental calcium, a larger number of tablets need to be consumed to reach desirable doses. For example, only 255 mg of elemental calcium in typical 3 tablets of calcium lactate, meaning that to obtain 1000 mg of supplemental elemental calcium from this form, 12 tablets would need to be consumed.
- Calcium gluconate is the calcium salt of gluconic acid, a carboxylic acid found in plants and honey. It contains 9% elemental calcium, making it less concentrated than calcium carbonate. Unlike calcium carbonate, calcium gluconate does not require stomach acid for absorption, making it suitable for individuals with low stomach acid production or those taking acid-reducing medications. Calcium gluconate is commonly used in emergency medicine to treat conditions like hypocalcemia (low calcium levels) and hyperkalemia (high potassium levels). While it is sold as a calcium supplement, other calcium preparations are often better for maintaining healthy calcium levels in the body, due to the lower concentration of elemental calcium in calcium gluconate, meaning that a larger number of tablets need to be consumed to reach desirable doses of calcium.
- Calcium chloride contains approximately 27.2% or 272 mg of elemental calcium per gram for the calcium chloride hexahydrate (CaCl_{2}·6H_{2}O). This means that for every gram of calcium chloride hexahydrate, there are 272 mg of actual, absorbable calcium. This high calcium content is one reason why calcium chloride is often used in medical treatments and as a calcium supplement. Another reason is fast absorption, which is useful for instant calcium supplementation in emergencies. It is medically used to treat or prevent low calcium levels, and to protect the heart from high potassium levels and high magnesium levels. Calcium chloride has a very salty taste and can cause mouth and throat irritation, so it's typically not the first choice for long-term oral supplementation. Calcium chloride, characterized by its low molecular weight and high water solubility, readily breaks down into calcium and chloride ions when exposed to water. These ions are efficiently absorbed from the intestine. Caution should be exercised when handling calcium chloride as it has the potential to release heat energy upon dissolution in water. This release of heat can lead to trauma and burns in the mouth, throat, esophagus, and stomach. In fact, there have been reported cases of stomach necrosis resulting from burns caused by calcium chloride.

Vitamin D is added to some calcium supplements. Proper vitamin D status is important because vitamin D is converted to a hormone in the body, which then induces the synthesis of intestinal proteins responsible for calcium absorption.

== Labeling ==
For US dietary supplement and food labeling purposes, the amount in a serving is expressed in milligrams and as a percent of Daily Value (%DV). The labels indicate the weight of the elemental calcium in the supplement, not the total weight of the compound. For instance, in the case of calcium citrate, the label specifies the weight of the elemental calcium, not the entire calcium citrate compound. For calcium labeling purposes 100% of the Daily Value was 1000 mg, but in May 2016 it was revised to 1000–1300 mg. A table of the pre-change adult Daily Values and references for the revision are provided at Reference Daily Intake. Food and supplement companies had until July 2018 to comply with the labeling change.
