= Pamyat (disambiguation) =

Pamyat was a Russian ultranationalist organization.

Pamyat may also refer to:

- Pamyat, a samizdat Soviet dissident journal produced by Arseny Roginsky
- Pamyat (film), a 1971 film directed by Grigori Chukhrai
- Vechnaya Pamyat, "Memory Eternal", chanted in honor of the departed in the Russian Orthodox Church
