= Polychronion =

Encomium of Byzantine Rite liturgy

The Polychronion (Greek: Πολυχρόνιον, "many years"; Georgian: მრავალჟამიერი, mravaljamieri; Church Slavonic: многая лѣта, romanized: mnogaya leta) is a solemn encomium chanted in the liturgy of the Eastern Orthodox and Byzantine Catholic churches. In the Roman rite, it is the equivalent of the liturgical acclamation Ad multos annos.

The Polychronion is chanted for the secular authorities (Orthodox monarchs are mentioned by name, non-orthodox leaders are mentioned by title), the church authorities (the Patriarch or diocesan bishop), individuals on specific occasions, and the whole community of Orthodox Christians.

== Forms ==
There are two forms of the Polychronion in the Slavic usage:

- The more formal, which usually takes place at the end of the Divine Liturgy in which the deacon (or priest, if there is no deacon) recites the names of the individuals to be commemorated, and the choir responds by chanting "Εἰς πολλὰ ἔτη", "Eis polla etē" ("Many years!") three times. A version of this type may also be used to commemorate individuals on important days such as the day of their baptism, their name day or the anniversary of a clergyman's ordination.
- In the less formal Polychronion the choir alone sings the commemorations, ending simply with "...may the Lord God preserve unto many years!", with no repetitions. This form is used at the end of Matins and Vespers.

== For an Orthodox sovereign ==
The Polychronion as chanted for a sovereign is derived from the traditional Latin acclamation "Ad multos annos" accorded by the populace to Roman Emperors. The acclamation was continued in Byzantine times in partially hellenized form: "Immultos annos", before it was completely translated into the Greek form "Εἰς πολλὰ ἔτη":

Πολυχρόνιον ποιῆσαι, Κύριος ὁ Θεός
τὸν εὐσεβέστατον Βασιλέα ἡμῶν [regnal name].
Κύριε, φύλαττε αὐτὸν
εἰς πολλὰ ἔτη. (three times)

Polychronion poiēsai Kyrios o Theos
ton eusebestaton basilea ēmōn [regnal name].
Kyrie phylatte auton
eis polla etē. (three times)

Grant long life, O Lord God,
to our most pious king [regnal name].
O Lord, preserve him,
unto many years. (three times)

Depending on circumstance, the names of other members of the reigning family can be added between the second and third lines, in the same form ("and to our most pious Queen X", "and to their most pious heir the Crown Prince Y" etc.). Since there remain no Orthodox monarchies nowadays, the Polychronion is only chanted for ecclesiastical authorities, namely the Patriarch or diocesan bishop, in which case it is usually called the "Phēmē" (Φήμη; "Fame").

== See also ==
- Live until 120
- Mnohaya lita
- Ton Despotin
- Memory eternal
