= Ad multos annos =

Christian liturgical acclamation

Ad multos annos (English: For many more years) is a Latin acclamation for celebrations, and also a hymn used in the rites of the Orthodox and Catholic churches.

== Origin ==
=== A Greco-Roman form of congratulation ===
Ad multos annos was a form of congratulation during Greco-Roman antiquity, which was especially used as an acclamation for higher-ranking people.

=== The Latin version of the Greek Polychronion ===
In the Orthodox liturgy, Ad multos annos has a Byzantine equivalent of the first millennium which is an acclamation called Eis polla eti (Greek εἰς πολλὰ ἔτη): it is part of the Polychronion. In Slavic Orthodoxy, especially Ukraine and Russia, Mnogaya leta has become a traditional celebratory song, akin to "Happy Birthday to You".

=== A century-old Catholic traditional acclamation ===
In the Roman Catholic liturgy, it was an element of the episcopal ordination rite first found in the Pontifical of Apamea from the 12th century: the newly consecrated bishop sang this three times to his consecrator; or in the case of an abbot at his investiture, once only. In a ceremonial similar to that of the Laudes Regiæ or Carolingian Litany, the bishop at his ordination would acclaim his consecrator in order to thank him. In three stages, the bishop would advance toward his consecrator, perform three genuflections, and sing three times giving his voice each time a higher pitch, the acclamation: Ad multos annos!

There is an exception to this rite: when the newly consecrated bishop is the pope (this happens when a man who is not a bishop is elected pope), it is the consecrator who sings to the pope, not vice versa.

It is still sung during major celebrations, such as conclaves for bishops who are elevated to the cardinalate. Today the Latin phrase is also used in greetings and toasts in academic and ecclesiastical circles, especially at the Pontifical North American College in Rome where it has become a refrain.

== Music ==
Ad multos annos was set to various musical arrangements.

Austrian composer Joseph Balthasar Hochreither wrote the Missa ad multos annos, his oldest surviving work from 1705, on the occasion of the consecration Abbot Maximilian Pagl of Lambach Abbey in Upper Austria. The premiere took place on April 19, 1705 in the Lambach collegiate church.

The most popular version of the Mnohaya lita sang in Russia, Ukraine and among the diaspora was composed by Dmitry Bortniansky (1751 † 1825), when he was choirmaster of the imperial chapel in Russia and it was adapted into the Latin Ad multos annos by Maxime Kovalevsky (1903 † 1988) when he was chapel master in Paris.

== Sources ==
- Kantorowicz, Ernst H. (1958). Laudes Regiae: A Study in Liturgical Acclamations and Mediaeval Ruler Worship. University of California Press.
