= Quackwatch =

American alternative medicine watchdog website

- Formation: 1969
- Founder: Stephen Barrett
- Dissolved: 2008 (as corporation); reorganized 2020 under Center for Inquiry
- Type: Health fraud watchdog
- Purpose: Combat health-related frauds, myths, fads, fallacies, and misconduct
- Headquarters: United States
- Official language: English, French, Portuguese
- Parent organization: Center for Inquiry
- Affiliations: National Council Against Health Fraud
- Website: quackwatch.org
- Formerly called: Lehigh Valley Committee Against Health Fraud

Quackwatch is a United States-based website focused on promoting consumer protection and providing information about health related frauds, myths, fads, fallacies, and misconduct. It primarily targets alternative medicine, questionable health claims, and practices it considers pseudoscience. It was founded in 1996 by Stephen Barrett, a retired psychiatrist and former co-chair of the Committee for Skeptical Inquiry. Initially operated under the nonprofit Quackwatch, Inc., it became part of the Center for Inquiry (CFI) in 2020. Its content is now maintained by CFI's Office of Consumer Protection and Pseudoscience.

Quackwatch has been cited by, and received both praise and criticism from, mainstream media, academic journals, and professional organizations. Supporters describe it as a resource for evidence-based health information, while critics, particularly proponents of alternative medicine, have challenged its tone and objectivity. The site includes articles, position papers, and links to regulatory actions, and it has been involved in broader efforts to monitor and report health fraud through affiliated networks such as the National Council Against Health Fraud and The Skeptics Society.

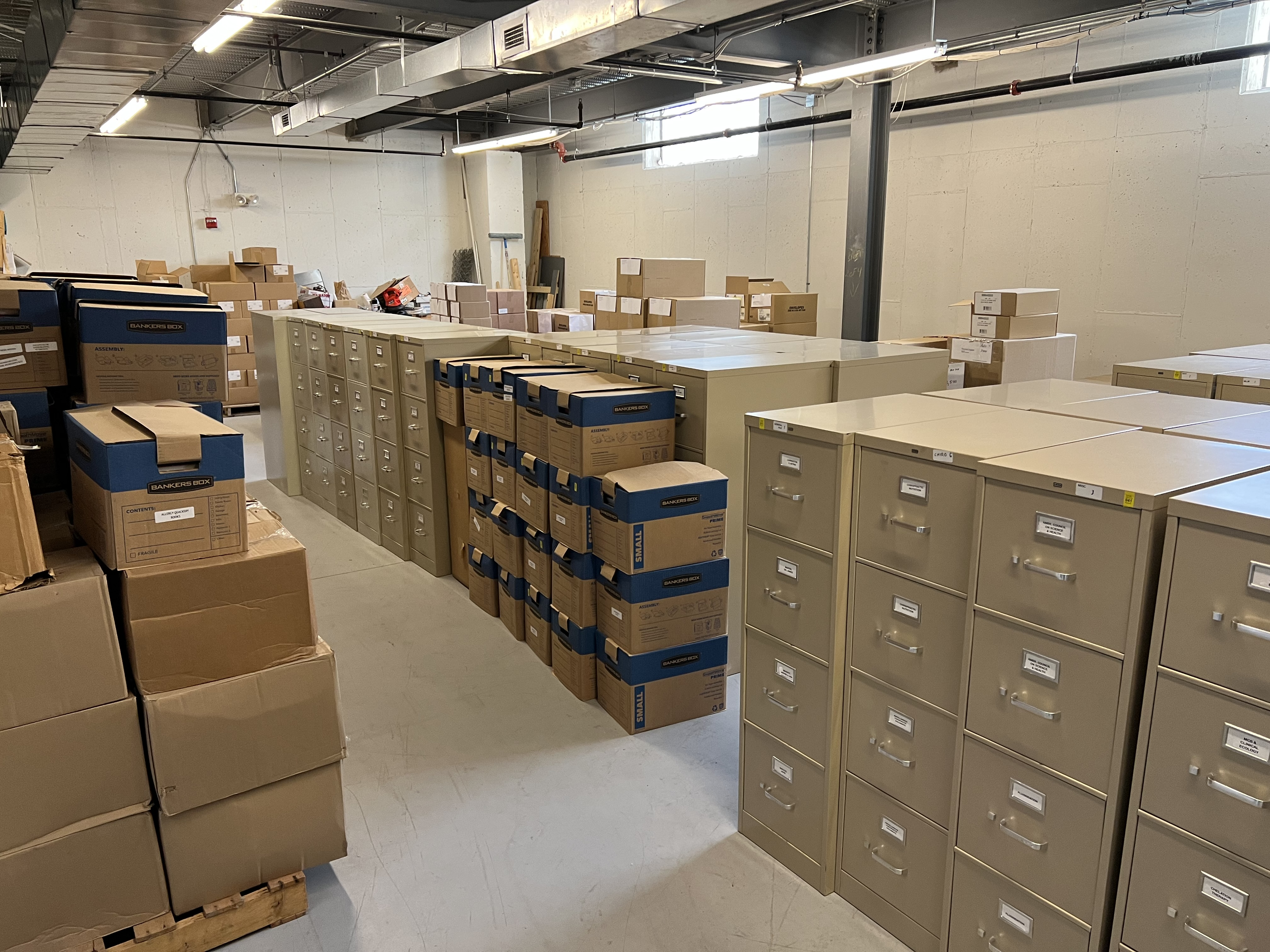
Quackwatch files at Center for Inquiry

== History ==
Barrett founded the Lehigh Valley Committee Against Health Fraud (LVCAHF) in 1969, and it was incorporated in the Commonwealth of Pennsylvania in 1970. In 1996, the corporation began the website quackwatch.org, and the organization itself was renamed Quackwatch, Inc. in 1997. The Pennsylvania nonprofit corporation was dissolved after Barrett moved to North Carolina in 2008, but the network's activities continue. Quackwatch co-founded, and was closely affiliated with, the National Council Against Health Fraud (NCAHF). The NCAHF was formally dissolved in 2011.

In February 2020, Quackwatch became part of the Center for Inquiry. CFI planned to maintain its various websites and to receive Barrett's library later in the year.

== Mission and scope ==
Quackwatch is overseen by Barrett, its owner, with input from advisors and help from volunteers, including a number of medical professionals. In 2003, 150 scientific and technical advisors: 67 medical advisors, 12 dental advisors, 13 mental health advisors, 16 nutrition and food science advisors, three podiatry advisors, eight veterinary advisors, and 33 other "scientific and technical advisors" were listed by Quackwatch. Many more have since volunteered, but advisor names are no longer listed.

Quackwatch describes its mission as follows:

... investigating questionable claims, answering inquiries about products and services, advising quackery victims, distributing reliable publications, debunking pseudoscientific claims, reporting illegal marketing, improving the quality of health information on the internet, assisting or generating consumer-protection lawsuits, and attacking misleading advertising on the internet.

Quackwatch has no salaried employees, and the total cost of operating all Quackwatch's sites is approximately $7,000 per year. It is funded mainly by small individual donations, commissions from sales on other sites to which they refer, profits from the sale of publications, and self-funding by Barrett.

== Site content ==
The Quackwatch website contains essays and white papers, written by Barrett and other writers, intended for the non-specialist consumer. The articles discuss health-related products, treatments, enterprises, and providers that Quackwatch deems to be misleading, fraudulent, or ineffective. Also included are links to article sources and both internal and external resources for further study.

The site is developed with the assistance from volunteers and expert advisors. Many of its articles cite peer-reviewed research and are footnoted with several links to references. A review in Running & FitNews stated the site "also provides links to hundreds of trusted health sites."

=== Related and subsidiary sites ===
Naturowatch is a subsidiary site of Quackwatch which aims to provide information about naturopathy that is "difficult or impossible to find elsewhere". The site is operated by Barrett and Kimball C. Atwood IV, an anesthesiologist by profession, who has become a vocal critic of alternative medicine.

The site is available in French and formerly in German and Portuguese, as well as via several mirrors.

== Influence ==
Sources that mention Stephen Barrett's Quackwatch as a useful source for consumer information include website reviews, government agencies, and various journals including The Lancet.

=== Mention in media, books, and journals ===
Quackwatch has been mentioned in the media, books and various journals, as well as receiving several awards and honors. The Journal of the American Medical Association mentioned Quackwatch as one of nine "select sites that provide reliable health information and resources" in 1998. It was also listed as one of three medical sites in U.S. News & World Report's "Best of the Web" in 1999. Thomas R. Eng, director of the U.S. Department of Health and Human Services Science Panel on Interactive Communication and Health, stated in 1999 that while "the government doesn't endorse Web sites ...[Quackwatch] is the only site I know of right now looking at issues of fraud and health on the Internet."

Sources that mention quackwatch.org as a resource for consumer information include the United States Department of Agriculture, the U.S. National Institutes of Health, the Skeptic's Dictionary, the Diet Channel, and articles published in The Lancet, the American Journal of Pharmaceutical Education, the Journal of Marketing Education, the Medical Journal of Australia, and the Journal of the American Dietetic Association. In addition, several nutrition associations link to Quackwatch. An article in PC World listed it as one of three websites for finding the truth about Internet rumors. A Washington Post review of alternative medicine websites noted that "skeptics may find Quackwatch offers better truth-squadding than the Food and Drug Administration or the National Center for Complementary and Alternative Medicine."

The books Low-Carb Dieting for Dummies (2003), The Arthritis Helpbook (2006), The Rough Guide to the Internet (2007), Navigating the Medical Maze: A Practical Guide (2008), Chronic Pain for Dummies (2008), and The 2009 Internet Directory (2008) mention or use content from Quackwatch.

=== Citations by journalists ===
Quackwatch and Barrett have also been cited by journalists in reports on therapeutic touch, Vitamin O, Almon Glenn Braswell's baldness treatments, Robert Barefoot's coral calcium claims, William C. Rader's "stem cell" therapy, noni juice, shark cartilage and saturated fat.

=== Recommendations and endorsements ===
The American Cancer Society lists Quackwatch as one of ten reputable sources of information about alternative and complementary therapies in their book Cancer Medicine. In a long series of articles on various alternative medicine methods, it uses Quackwatch as a reference and includes criticisms of the methods.

The Health On the Net Foundation, which confers the HONcode "Code of Conduct" certification to reliable sources of health information in cyberspace, recommends Quackwatch. It also advises Internet users to alert Quackwatch when they encounter "possibly or blatantly fraudulent" healthcare websites.

In a 2007 feasibility study on a method for identifying web pages that make unproven claims, the authors wrote:

Our gold standard relied on selected unproven cancer treatments identified by experts at http://www.quackwatch.org ... By using unproven treatments identified by an oversight organization, we capitalized on an existing high quality review.

== Site reviews ==
Writing in the trade-journal The Consultant Pharmacist in 1999, pharmacist Bao-Anh Nguyen-Khoa characterized Quackwatch as "relevant for both consumers and professionals" and containing articles that would be of interest to pharmacists, but that a peer review process would improve the site's legitimacy. Nguyen-Khoa said the presence of so many articles written by Barrett gave an impression of lack of balance but that the site was taking steps to correct this by recruiting expert contributors. He also noted that

Barrett often inserts his strong opinions directly into sections of an article already well supported by the literature. Although entertaining, this direct commentary may be viewed by some as less than professional medical writing and may be better reserved for its own section.

Donna Ladd, a journalist with The Village Voice, in 1999 described Barrett as "a full-time journalist and book author", "never a medical researcher", and one who "depends heavily on negative research ... in which alternative therapies do not work" but "says that most case studies that show positive results of alternative therapies are unreliable". She quoted Barrett as saying that "a lot of things don't need to be tested [because] they simply don't make any sense".

Writing in The Lancet, Mona Okasha wrote that Quackwatch provides an "entertaining read", but described it as only appropriate for limited use as it fails to provide a balanced view of alternative cancer treatments. Jane Cuzzell viewed Quackwatch similarly, arguing that it was entertaining but that the "resource value of this site depends on what the visitor is seeking" and had concerns about the appearance of bias in the selection of the material. However, while Lillian Brazin also found it to be biased, she described Quackwatch as credible, and noted both the credentials of the contributors and the thoroughness of the content.

In a 2002 book, Ned Vankevitch, associate professor of communications at Trinity Western University, places Barrett in a historical tradition of anti-quackery, embracing such figures as Morris Fishbein and Abraham Flexner, which has been part of American medical culture since the early-twentieth century. Although acknowledging that Quackwatch's "exposé of dangerous and fraudulent health products represents an important social and ethical response to deception and exploitation", Vankevitch criticizes Barrett for attempting to limit "medical diversity", employing "denigrating terminology", categorizing all complementary and alternative medicine as a species of medical hucksterism, failing to condemn shortcomings within conventional biomedicine, and for promoting an exclusionary model of medical scientism and health that serves hegemonic interests and does not fully address patient needs.

Waltraud Ernst, professor of the history of medicine at Oxford Brookes University, commenting on Vankevitch's observations in 2002, agrees that attempts to police the "medical cyber-market with a view to preventing fraudulent and potentially harmful practices may well be justified". She commends "Barrett's concern for unsubstantiated promotion and hype," and says that "Barrett's concern for fraudulent and potentially dangerous medical practices is important," but she sees Barrett's use of "an antiquarian term such as 'quack'" as part of a "dichotomising discourse that aims to discredit the "'old-fashioned', 'traditional', 'folksy' and heterodox by contrasting it with the 'modern', 'scientific' and orthodox." Ernst also interprets Barrett's attempt to "reject and label as 'quackery' each and every approach that is not part of science-based medicine" as one which minimizes the patient's role in the healing process and is inimical to medical pluralism.

A 2003 website review by Forbes magazine stated:

Dr. Stephen Barrett, a psychiatrist, seeks to expose unproven medical treatments and possible unsafe practices through his homegrown but well-organized site. Mostly attacking alternative medicines, homeopathy and chiropractors, the tone here can be rather harsh. However, the lists of sources of health advice to avoid, including books, specific doctors and organizations, are great for the uninformed. Barrett received an FDA Commissioner's Special Citation Award for fighting nutrition quackery in 1984. BEST: Frequently updated, but also archives of relevant articles that date back at least four years. WORST: Lists some specific doctors and organizations without explaining the reason for their selection.

A 2004 review paper by Katja Schmidt and Edzard Ernst in the Annals of Oncology identified Quackwatch as an outstanding complementary medicine information source for cancer patients.

The Good Web Guide said in 2006 that Quackwatch "is without doubt an important and useful information resource and injects a healthy dose of scepticism into reviewing popular health information", but "tends to define what is possible or true only in terms of what science has managed to 'prove' to date".

The organization has often been challenged by supporters and practitioners of the various forms of alternative medicine that are criticized on the website.

== See also ==
- Consumer protection
- Crackpot index
- Evidence-based medicine
- Hoax
- Medical ethics
- Pathological science
- Scientific Review of Alternative Medicine
- Scientific skepticism
- List of topics characterized as pseudoscience
