= Research into centenarians =

Systematic investigation into what factors influence centenarians' aging

A centenarian is a person who has attained the age of 100 years or more. Research on centenarians has become more common with clinical and general population studies now having been conducted in France, Hungary, Japan, Italy, Finland, Denmark, the United States, and China. Centenarians are the second fastest-growing demographic in much of the developed world. By 2030, it is expected that there will be around a million centenarians worldwide. In the United States, a 2010 Census Bureau report found that more than 80 percent of centenarians are women.

== Biochemical factors ==
Research carried out in Italy suggests that healthy centenarians have high levels of vitamin A and vitamin E and that this seems to be important in guaranteeing their extreme longevity. Other research contradicts this and has found that these findings do not apply to centenarians from Sardinia, for whom other factors probably play a more important role. A preliminary study carried out in Poland showed that, in comparison with young healthy female adults, centenarians living in Upper Silesia had significantly higher red blood cell glutathione reductase and catalase activities and higher, although insignificantly, serum levels of vitamin E. Researchers in Denmark have also found that centenarians exhibit a high activity of glutathione reductase in red blood cells. In this study, those centenarians having the best cognitive and physical functional capacity tended to have the highest activity of this enzyme.

Some research suggests that high levels of vitamin D may be associated with longevity.

Other research has found that people having parents who became centenarians have an increased number of naïve B cells.

It is believed that centenarians possess a different adiponectin isoform pattern and have a favorable metabolic phenotype in comparison with elderly individuals.

== Genetic factors ==
Research carried out in the United States has found that people are much more likely to celebrate their 100th birthday if their brother or sister has reached the age. These findings, from the New England Centenarian Study in Boston, suggest that the sibling of a centenarian is four times more likely to live past 90 than the general population. Other research carried out by the New England Centenarian Study has identified 150 genetic variations that appeared to be associated with longevity which could be used to predict with 77 percent accuracy whether someone would live to be at least 100.

Research also suggests that there is a clear link between living to 100 and inheriting a hyperactive version of telomerase, an enzyme that prevents cells from ageing. Scientists from the Albert Einstein College of Medicine in the US say centenarian Ashkenazi Jews have this mutant gene.

Many centenarians manage to avoid chronic diseases even after indulging in a lifetime of serious health risks. For example, many people in the New England Centenarian Study experienced a century free of cancer or heart disease despite smoking as many as 60 cigarettes a day for 50 years. The same applies to people from Okinawa in Japan, where around half of supercentenarians had a history of smoking and one-third were regular alcohol drinkers. It is possible that these people may have had genes that protected them from the dangers of carcinogens or the random mutations that crop up naturally when cells divide.

Similarly, centenarian research carried out at the Albert Einstein College of Medicine found that the individuals studied had less than sterling health habits. As a group, for example, they were more obese, more sedentary and exercised less than other, younger cohorts. The researchers also discovered three uncommon genotype similarities among the centenarians: one gene that causes HDL cholesterol to be at levels two- to three-fold higher than average; another gene that results in a mildly underactive thyroid; and a functional mutation in the human growth hormone axis that may be a safeguard from aging-associated diseases.

It is well known that the children of parents who have a long life are also likely to reach a healthy age, but it is not known why, although the inherited genes are probably important. A variation in the gene FOXO3 is known to have a positive effect on the life expectancy of humans, and is found much more often in people living to 100 and beyond – moreover, this appears to be true worldwide.

Some research suggests that centenarian offspring are more likely to age in better cardiovascular health than their peers.

This account of the Okinawa study puts the centenarian rate there at about 40 to 50 in every 100,000 people, set against about 10 to 20 in every 100,000 in most industrial countries.

Sisters of those centenarians were found to be 2.58 times as likely as other women born in the same years to reach 90, and brothers 5.43 times as likely as other men from those years.

== Other factors ==
A 2011 study found people with exceptional longevity (aged 95 and older) not to be distinct from the general population in terms of lifestyle factors such as regular physical activity, diet or alcohol consumption.

A study indicates gut microbiomes with large amounts of microbes capable of generating unique secondary bile acids are a key element of centenarians' longevity.

== General observations ==
Several studies have shown that centenarians have better cardiovascular risk profiles compared to younger old people. The contribution of drug treatments to promote extreme longevity is not confirmed and centenarians in general have needed fewer drugs at younger ages due to a healthy lifestyle. A study by the International Longevity Centre-UK, published in 2011, suggested that today's centenarians may be healthier than the next generation of centenarians.

Ninety percent of the centenarians studied in the New England Centenarian Study were functionally independent the vast majority of their lives up until the average age of 92 years and 75% were the same at an average age of 95 years. Similarly, a study of US supercentenarians (age 110 and older) showed that, even at these advanced ages, 40% needed little assistance or were independent.

A study supported by the US National Institute on Aging found significant associations between month of birth and longevity, with individuals born in September–November having a higher likelihood of becoming centenarians compared to March-born individuals.

In the United States, a 2010 Census Bureau report found that more than 80 percent of centenarians are women.

== Possible errors in records ==
In 2024, Saul Justin Newman published a pre-print paper finding that reports of supercentenarians and extreme age population tend to come from areas with dubious demographic data. The study argues that document validation, the only method that demographers use to verify old age, is susceptible to errors that have often been ignored due to confirmation bias and other factors, causing inflated number of valid cases. This suggests that many figures of supercentenarian population, and studies that rely on those populations especially in the so-called Blue zones, may contain substantial errors that have yet to reassessed critically. In one blue zone example, 82% of the supercentenarian population were discovered to be missing, imaginary, clerical errors, or dead upon verification. In another example, 72% of the centenarian population were misreported as still living to collect pension benefits. The study was awarded with the Ig Nobel Prize in 2024.

== See also ==
- Centenarian
- Food choice of older adults
- New England Centenarian Study
- Okinawa Centenarian Study
- Acciaroli § Centenarians (study project of UC San Diego Health)
