= Tom Perls =

Founding director of the New England Centenarian Study

Thomas Perls (born 1960) is the founding director of the New England Centenarian Study, the longest-running largest study of centenarians and their family members in the world. The Study is worldwide in scope but most of the participants come from the United States and Canada and is funded by three National Institute on Aging grants: The Integrative Longevity Omics Study, Centenarian Project of the Longevity Consortium and the Long Life Family Study. The study is also funded, with great appreciation, by the William M. Wood Foundation and the Paulette and Marty Samowitz Foundation. Born in Palo Alto, California, Perls later moved to Colorado and now lives in Boston. He received his B.A. from Pitzer College in 1982, his M.D. from the University of Rochester School of Medicine and Dentistry in 1986, and his M.P.H. from Harvard University in 1993. Perls is Professor of medicine at Boston University School of Medicine and attending physician in geriatrics at Boston Medical Center. He is the author of over 160 peer-reviewed articles primarily in biodemography and genetics of exceptional human longevity and anti-aging quackery.

Generally, the study has found that centenarians and their children (in their 70s thru 90s) age relatively slowly and have decreased risk for aging-related diseases including Alzheimer's, cancer, diabetes, cardiovascular disease, stroke, and restrictive lung disease. Our studies are using different but synergistic approaches to discover the biological and environmental exposure and behavioral mechanisms by which these individuals age so well and live so long.

Perls is the author of the online "Living to 100 Life Expectancy Calculator". Perls is a prominent critic of "hormone replacement therapy" including growth hormone and testosterone for "anti-aging" and "age-management". He is author of the website hghwatch.com. and he has testified before the U.S. Congress, as well as provided written testimony for the U.S. Sentencing Commission regarding illegal distribution of growth hormone for anti-aging. Perls is the author of several academic articles about the medical misuse and illegal distribution of growth hormone and anabolic steroids, including testosterone, for anti-aging and bodybuilding.
