= Health On the Net Foundation =

Nonprofit organization that certifies online medical information

- Type: non-profit non-governmental organization
- Industry: Healthcare
- Founded: September 1995
- Defunct: 15 December 2022
- Headquarters: Geneva, Switzerland
- Products: Certification, health search engine and education
- Website: https://www.healthonnet.org/

Health On the Net Foundation (HON) was a Swiss not-for-profit organization based in Geneva which promoted a code of conduct for websites providing health information and offered certificates to those in compliance.

In September 2022, Health On the Net website pages included the advisory text "HON is no longer updated and will be permanently discontinued on December 15, 2022. Despite all our efforts, it is no longer possible to maintain it. We thank you for your understanding." As of March 2024, their domain names are inactive.

== Foundation ==
In 1995, 60 participants at an international health conference agreed to form a permanent body to promote the dissemination of accurate health information through technology. Health On the Net was founded under the auspices of the Geneva Department of Employment, Social Affairs and Health. It holds consultative status with the Economic and Social Council of the United Nations (ECOSOC) and a special relationship with the World Health Organization (WHO). The French National Health Authority appointed Health On the Net in 2007 as its official body to certify health websites based in France.

As a "Liaison A" to the International Organization for Standardization (ISO) Health Informatics Technical Committee (ISO/TC 215), Health On the Net contributes to the elaboration of standards developed by the committee.

Health On the Net offered an array of tools and services, including the HON Code of Conduct and its certification process; the Khresmoi and HONselect search engines; Provisu.ch, a database of health information on eye diseases, accessible by those with poor or no vision; and Santeromande.ch, a database directed towards French speakers in Switzerland and France, providing health information and a directory of registered health professionals and organisations.

== Certification ==
The HONcode Logo

HON Foundation issued a code of conduct (HONcode) for medical and health websites to address reliability and usefulness of medical information on the Internet. The principles of the HONcode are:

1. Authority – information and advice given only by medical professionals with credentials of author/s, or a clear statement if this is not the case
2. Complementarity – information and help are to support, not replace, patient-healthcare professional relationships which is the desired means of contact
3. Confidentiality – how the site treats personal and non-personal information of readers
4. Attribution – references to source of information (URL if available) and when it was last updated
5. Justifiability – any treatment, product or service must be supported by balanced, well-referenced scientific information
6. Transparency of authorship – contact information, preferably including email addresses, of authors should be available
7. Transparency of sponsorship – sources of funding for the site
8. Honesty in advertising and editorial policy – details about advertising on the site and clear distinction between advertised and editorial material

Each principle also had a Web 2.0 component in order to address the evolution of the Web in terms of information provision, including social media use.

HONCode is not designed to rate the veracity of the information provided by a website. Rather, the code only states that the site holds to the standards, so that readers can know the source and purpose of the medical information presented. The HONcode is voluntary, which means that webmasters and information providers apply for HONcode certification. Following this, the website is reviewed by a specialized team of health and legal professionals. The HONcode certification is dynamic and is renewed yearly according to site compliance. The first year of certification is free of charge. However, the new recertification process, started in 2014 when the foundation's government sponsors required the foundation to develop its financial independence, requires a financial contribution from the sites requesting recertification. The fees are as follows: €50 for non-profits with little visibility, €160 for sites with high visibility, and €325 for commercial websites. Visibility is determined by the website's Alexa ranking.

In 2020, there were currently more than 8,000 HONcode certified websites, including WebMD, Everyday Health, Drugs.com, and Healthline. The HONcode has been translated into 35 languages. It is the oldest and the most used code for medical and health-related information on the internet.

Research in 2015 showed that the HONcode is an indicator of reliability of health information. Additional studies demonstrate that websites using the HONcode quality standards are more reliable than those that do not. Additionally, the HONcode has been identified as an indicator of accuracy. Certified health pages have a statistically representative higher quality score than health websites that were not certified, with one going so far as to say that "the results of their analysis have shown a quality score that is statistically superior for HON-certified sites proving that even if it is imperfect, this label remains a coherent and trustworthy tool.” (Translated from the French: “Les résultats de notre analyse ont montré un score de qualité statistiquement supérieur pour les sites certifiés HON prouvant que, même si imparfait, ce label reste un outil cohérent et fiable.")

== Limits and criticism ==
The HONcode only applied to a website's editorial processes and details, not to the actual published contents. The term "certification" can be misleading to the general public, as it can imply that the contents of the website are trustworthy, reliable or otherwise independent. However, because the certification process is based on both self-declaration of adherence to the principles and assessment by a HONcode expert verifying that this is the case, it is not possible for a site to be initially certified if it does not meet the HONcode principles.

However, it was possible for a certified site to change its content such that it no longer meets the certification criteria. While website owners are required to inform HON of any fundamental changes to their website during periods between certification and recertification, this is not always the case. Thus a site may be listed as certified when it no longer is. This is addressed at latest during the recertification process, or earlier if HON is notified that the site no longer meets certification standards. The HONcode is considered a useful guide and for some it provides the best overall guidance compared to other tools, but in the end the reliability of the information is also dependent on the information provider.

The HONcode principles themselves are subject to criticism, with some experts indicating they are not adapted to modern Internet usages and do not follow their own rules. In response to those limitations, one previously certified website has decided to no longer display the Health On the Net logo.

Yet greater awareness of the HONcode and its certification process was needed, with the authors of one study highlighting the need “to broadcast the relevance of HON certification so that creditable medical health information could be published online”.

== HONcode misuse ==
In 2000, a journal article raised a number of problems with the HONcode logo, indicating that consumers may mistake it as an award or interpret it as an indicator for assessed information. Other issues with the HONcode logo were discussed in the Journal of Medical Internet Research, a peer-reviewed eHealth journal. Websites that are not in compliance with HONcode can continue to display the seal, as Health On the Net Foundation (HON) has no means of forcing the offending webmaster to remove the certification seal. However, as the certification seal is active and dynamic, leading to a page on HON servers with the date of the certification's validity and the status of certification in real time, the link from websites will lead to the page showing that the site is no longer in compliance (i.e., that it is either being reassessed or the certification has been revoked). This is indicated in real time. It is, however, possible for the site to retain the logo without the click through. Thus, users should be aware that if the seal is not clickable, the site is no longer in compliance and is misusing the logo.

Consumer protection advocate Stephen Barrett has been a strong supporter of the HONcode and has made efforts to improve compliance with its rules and to expose those who misuse it. A 2004 special supplement to The Washington Post provides coverage of his views on the subject, including suggested improvements and his criticisms of many named misusers.

The HONcode relies on noncompliance being reported by consumers. In cases of suspected fraudulent websites or of misuse of the HONcode, HON advises internet users to alert Quackwatch or HON itself through the complaint mechanism on the HON website: "If you come across a healthcare Web site that you believe is either possibly or blatantly fraudulent and does NOT display the HONcode, please alert Quackwatch. Of course, if such a site DOES display the HONcode, alert us immediately."

Other problems with the application of the HONcode principles are that HON does not have a means of verifying many of the principles, such as credentials (medical or otherwise) as stated on websites displaying the logo, or that copyright or confidentiality is not violated by webmasters.
