= Shatayu Samman =

Award given in Madhya Pradesh, India

- Awarded for: Attaining the age of above 100 years
- Country: India
- Presented by: Government of Madhya Pradesh

Shatayu Samman is an award given to persons who lived for a century, by the Government of Madhya Pradesh, India. It is given to encourage consciousness about health.

== Recipients ==
- Parasram Gurjar (10 October 1886 – 10 December 2011) He was awarded Shatayu Samman on 1 October 2011 on World Elders' Day.

== See also ==
- Centenarian
- Supercentenarian
