= Centenarian =

Person who has turned 100 years old

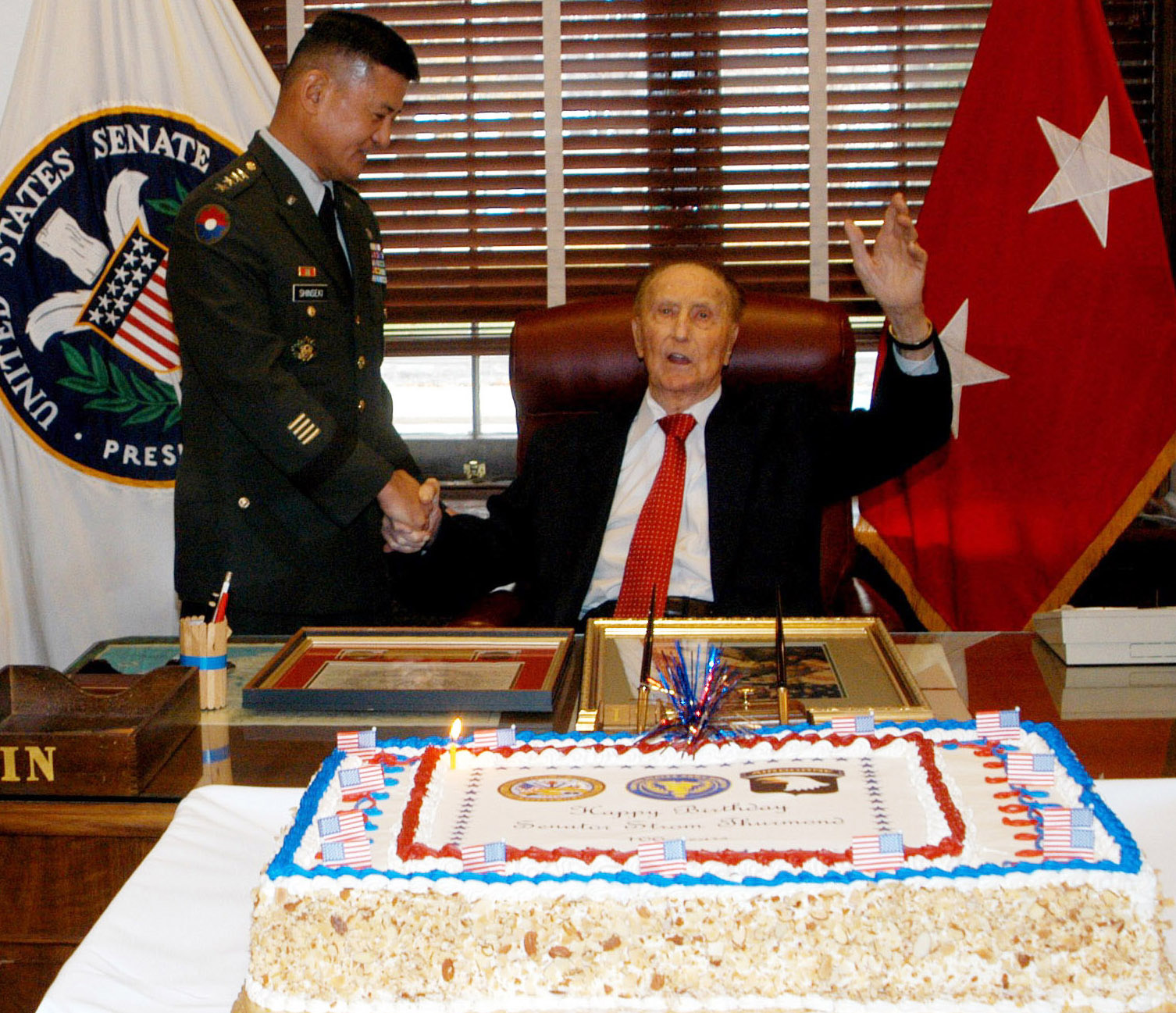
U.S. senator Strom Thurmond celebrating his 100th birthday while shaking hands with Eric Shinseki

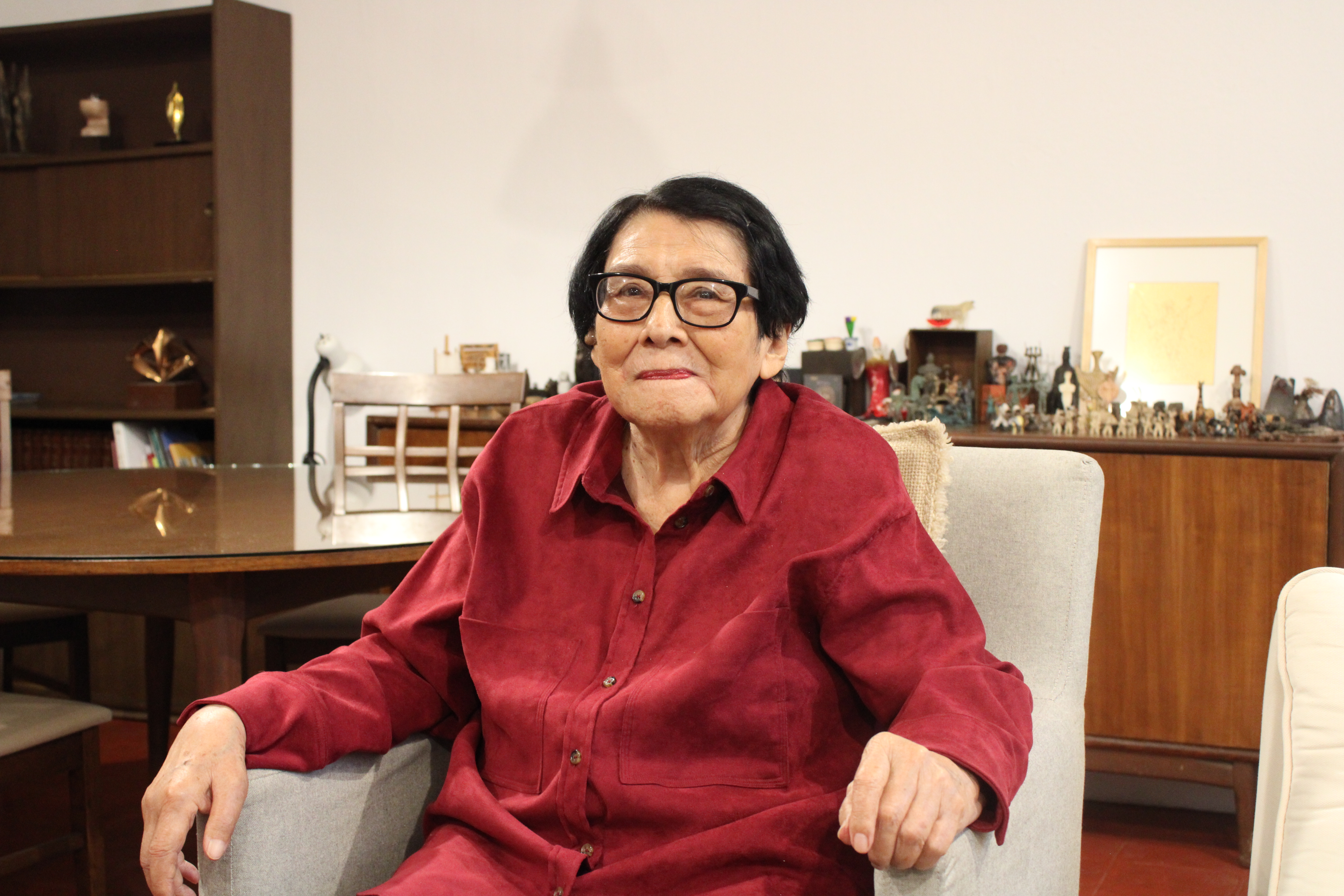
María Lagunes, Mexican writer, pictured at the age of 100 in 2023

A centenarian is a person who has reached the age of 100. Because life expectancies at birth worldwide are well below 100, the term is invariably associated with longevity. The United Nations estimated that there were 316,600 living centenarians worldwide in 2012, and 573,000 in 2020, almost quadruple the 2000 estimate of 151,000.

As world population and life expectancy continue to increase, the number of centenarians is expected to increase substantially in the 21st century. According to the Office of National Statistics in the United Kingdom, one-third of babies born in the country in 2013 are expected to live to 100.

According to a 1998 United Nations demographic survey, Japan is expected to have 272,000 centenarians by 2050; other sources suggest that the number could be closer to 1 million. The incidence of centenarians in Japan was one per 3,522 people in 2008.

In Japan (as in most countries), the population of centenarians is highly skewed towards women. Japan in fiscal year 2016 had 57,525 female centenarians, while there were 8,167 males, a ratio of 7:1. The increase of centenarians was even more skewed, at 11.6:1.

== Worldwide incidence by country ==
The total number of centenarians in the world is uncertain. The Population Division of the United Nations estimated that there were 23,000 in 1950, 110,000 in 1990, 150,000 in 1995, 209,000 in 2000, 324,000 in 2005, 455,000 in 2009, 675,000 in 2019 and 935,000 in 2024.

These older estimates, however, did not take into account downward adjustments of national estimates made by several countries such as the United States. The UN estimated in 2012, as a result of these adjustments, that there were only 316,600 centenarians worldwide. The following table gives estimated centenarian populations by country, including both the latest and the earliest known estimates, where available.

A study which received a 2024 Ig Nobel Prize found these numbers are inflated by welfare and pension fraud and poor record-keeping, neither of which are uniform across jurisdictions.

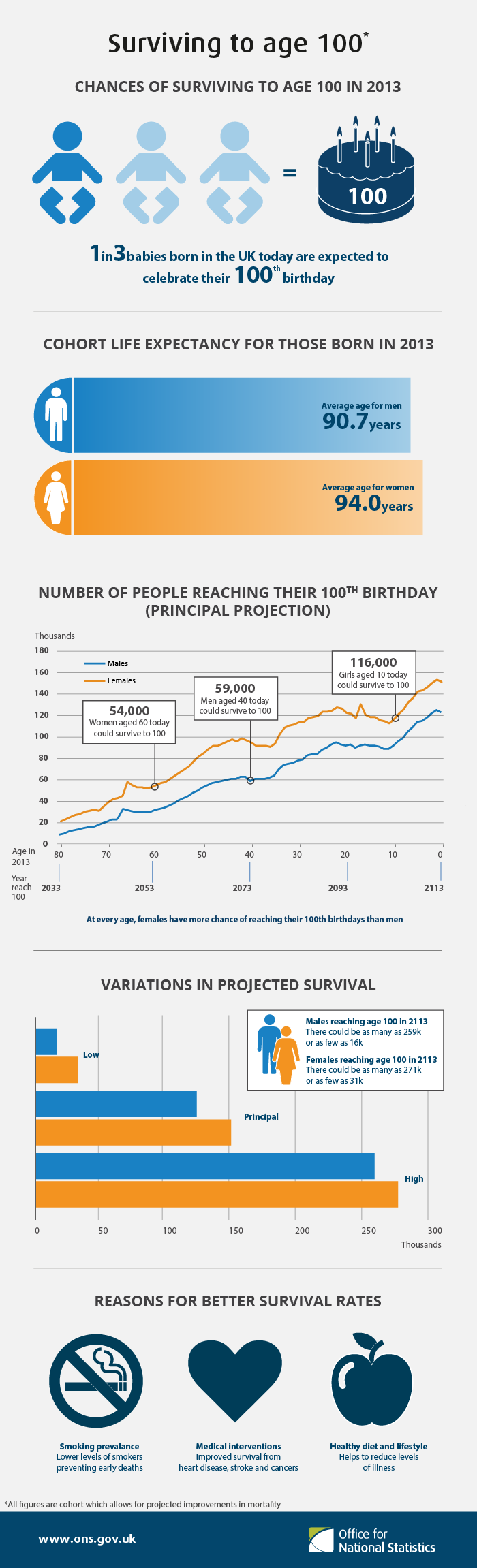
Chances of surviving to age 100 in the UK in 2013

Country	Latest estimate (year)	Earlier estimates (year)	Centenarians per 100,000 people
Andorra	7 (2002)	–	10.2
Argentina	6,043 (2025)	234 (1869); 863 (1947)	12.9
Australia	7,345 (2025)	50 (1901)	26.6
Austria	1,841 (2026)	232 (1990), 25 (1960)	40.5
Barbados	114 (2016)	–	39.9
Belgium	3,172 (2025)	23 (1950)	26.8
Brazil	37,814 (2022)	7,146 (1872)	12.5
Bulgaria	353 (2022)	233 (2010)	5.5
Cambodia	3,143 (2019)	–	20.2
Canada	12,281 (2025)	–	29.5
China	54,166 (2013)	4,469 (1990), 17,800 (2007)	4.0
Colombia	19,400 (2023)	–	36.9
Croatia	944 (2023)	244 (2013)	23.3
Czech Republic	977 (2024)	404 (2006)	9.0
Denmark	1,224 (2025)	32 (1941)	20.3
Dominica	23 (July 2021)		31.9
Estonia	255 (2026)	42 (1990)	18.7
Finland	1,153 (2023)	11 (1960)	20.6
France	37,000 (2025)	100 (1900)	53.6
Germany	17,901 (2024)	232 (1885)	21.4
Hungary	906 (2023)	76 (1949), 227 (1990)	9.4
Iceland	41 (2026)	3 (1960)	12.1
India	27,000 (2015)	–	2.1
Ireland	789 (2026)	87 (1990)	18.1
Israel	3,328 (2022)	1,015 (2006)	34.8
Italy	24,710 (2026)	99 (1872)	41.9
Japan	99,763 (2025)	81 (1884), 105 (1930), 97 (1950), 155 (1960), 54,397 (2013)	80.6
Malaysia	2,296 (2024)		6.7
Malta	24 (2016)	31 (2011)	
Mexico	18,295 (2020)	2,403 (1990)	14.5
Netherlands	2,583 (2025)	18 (1830)	14.3
New Zealand	1,078 (2024)	18 (1960); 297 (1991)	20.9
Norway	1,382 (2026)	44 (1951)	24.6
Peru	2,707 (2013)	1,682 (2011)	8.4
Poland	7,387 (2023)	500 (1970)	19.6
Portugal	4,143 (2025)	1,658 (2012)	36.3
Romania	3,713 (2026)	2,087 (2024)	19.4
Russia	17,000 (2025)	6,700 (2007)	11.9
Singapore	1,500 (2020)	41 (1990)	26.38
Slovenia	388 (2025)	2 (1953), 224 (2013)	18.2
Slovakia	401 (2021)		7.4
South Africa	22,525 (2023)	15,581 (2011)	36.7
South Korea	8,891 (2025)	961	17.2
Spain	18,751 (2026)	4,269 (2002)	41.1
Sweden	2,961 (2024)	46 (1950)	28.0
Switzerland	2,086 (2023)	7 (1860)	22.1
Thailand	45,561 (2024)	–	69.1
Trinidad and Tobago	1,687 (2022)		
Turkey	8,290 (2025)	–	9.6
United Kingdom	16,600 (2024)	107 (1911)	24
United States	119,182 (2025)	2,300 (1950), 53,364 (2010)	34.9
Uruguay	519 (2011)	–	15.8
World estimates	980,226 (2026)	23,000 (1950), 316,600 (2012)	11.6

== Supercentenarians ==
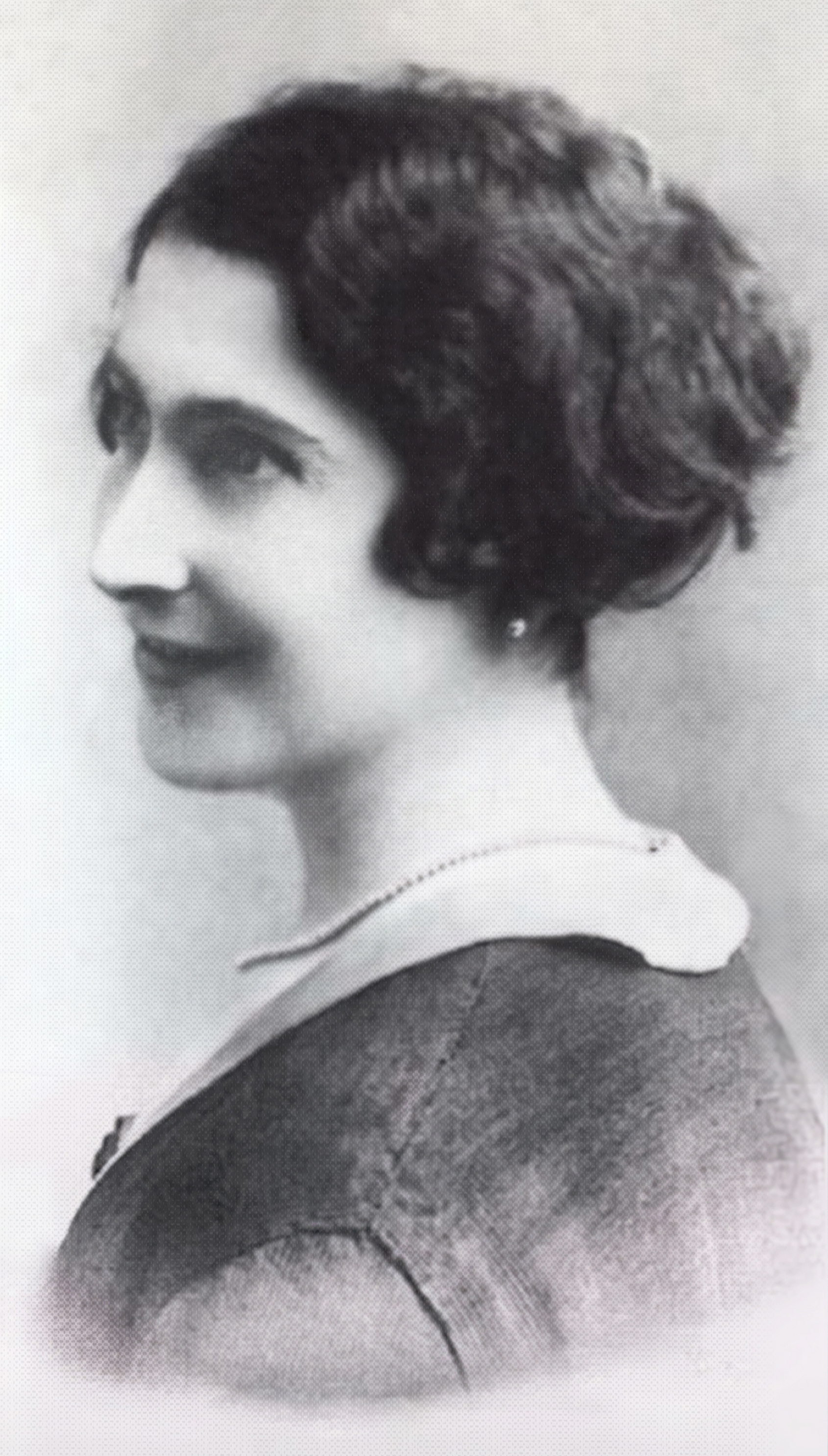
Jeanne Calment (1875–1997), the oldest verified person ever, who lived to be 122.

A supercentenarian, sometimes hyphenated as super-centenarian, is a person who has reached the age of 110 years. This age milestone is only achieved by about one in a thousand centenarians.

Even rarer is a person who has lived to 115. There are 82 people in recorded history who have indisputably reached 115. Only three of the people who have reached 115 are men (Jiroemon Kimura, Christian Mortensen and Emiliano Mercado del Toro). Ethel Caterham, Naomi Whitehead, Lucia Laura Sangenito, Yolanda Beltrão de Azevedo, and Beatriz Ferreira Duarte are the only people currently alive who have verifiably reached the 115 year milestone.

Jeanne Calment from France is the only age-verified person in human history to have reached the age of 120 years.

== Recognition and congratulations ==
=== History, blessings and traditions ===
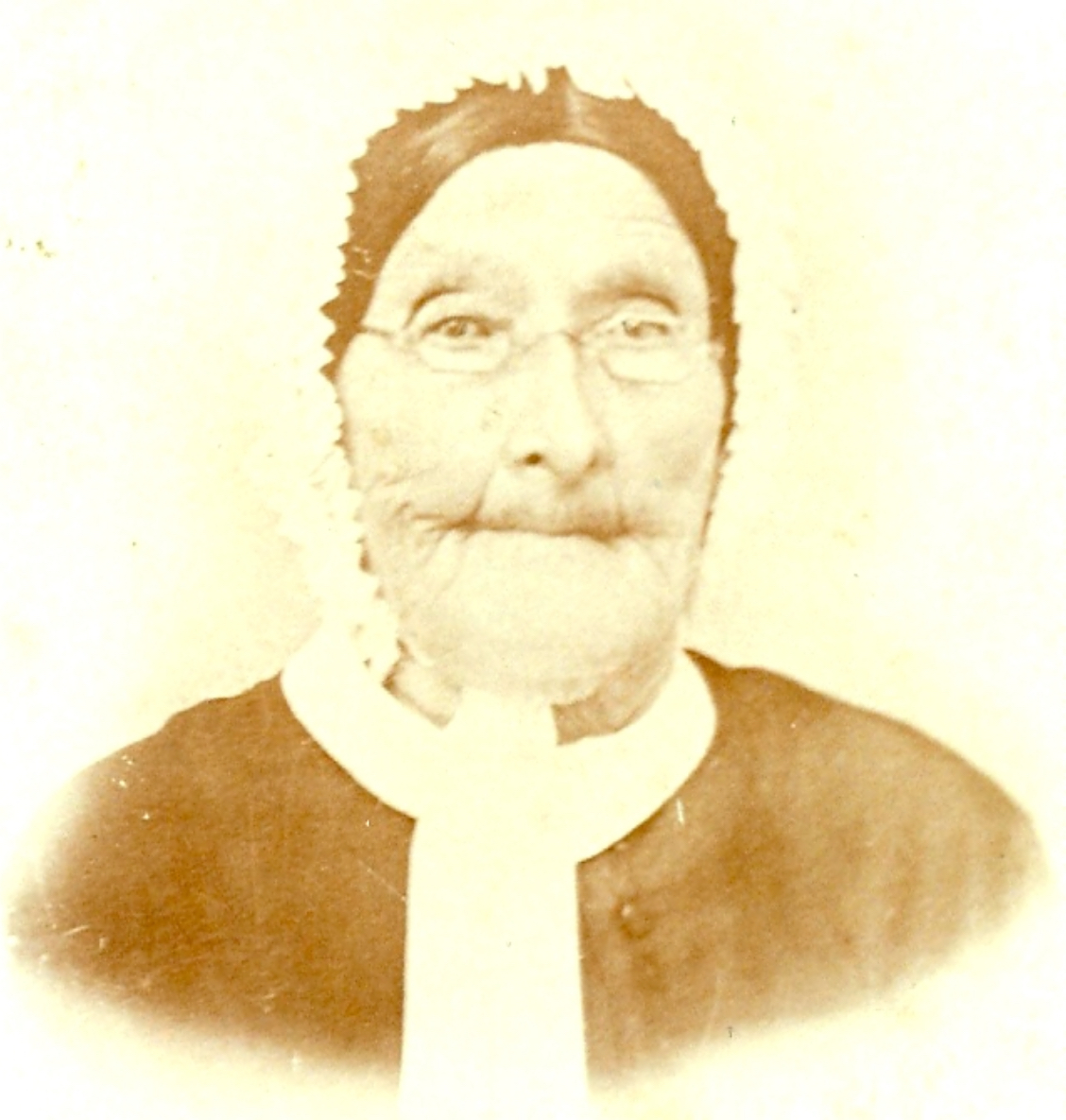
pre-19th Century Centenarian Sarah Baird, of New Jersey, pictured in 1880 on her 100th birthday

An aspect of blessing in many cultures is to offer a wish that the recipient lives to 100 years old. Among Hindus in India, where touching feet of elders and respected is a tradition, people who touch the feet of elders are often blessed with "May you live a hundred years". In Sweden, the traditional birthday song states, May he/she live for one hundred years. In Judaism, May you live to be 120 years old is a common blessing. In Poland, Sto lat, a wish to live a hundred years, is a traditional form of praise and good wishes, and the song "sto lat, sto lat" is sung on the occasion of the birthday celebrations—arguably, it is the most popular song in Poland and among Poles around the globe.

According to legends, Sages from ancient India lived and meditated for tens of thousands of years while Great Kings ruled their kingdoms for thousands of years.

Chinese emperors were hailed to live ten thousand years, while empresses were hailed to live a thousand years.

In Italy, "A hundred of these days!" (cento di questi giorni) is an augury for birthdays, to live to celebrate 100 more birthdays. Some Italians say "A cent'anni!", which means "To a hundred years", in that they wish that they could all live happily for a hundred years. In Greece, wishing someone Happy Birthday ends with the expression να τα εκατοστήσεις (na ta ekatostisis), which can be loosely translated as "may you make it one hundred birthdays". In Sri Lanka, it is a custom to bless as "you may live 220 instead of 120".

In many countries, people receive a gift or congratulations from federal/state institutions on their 100th birthday.

== United States ==
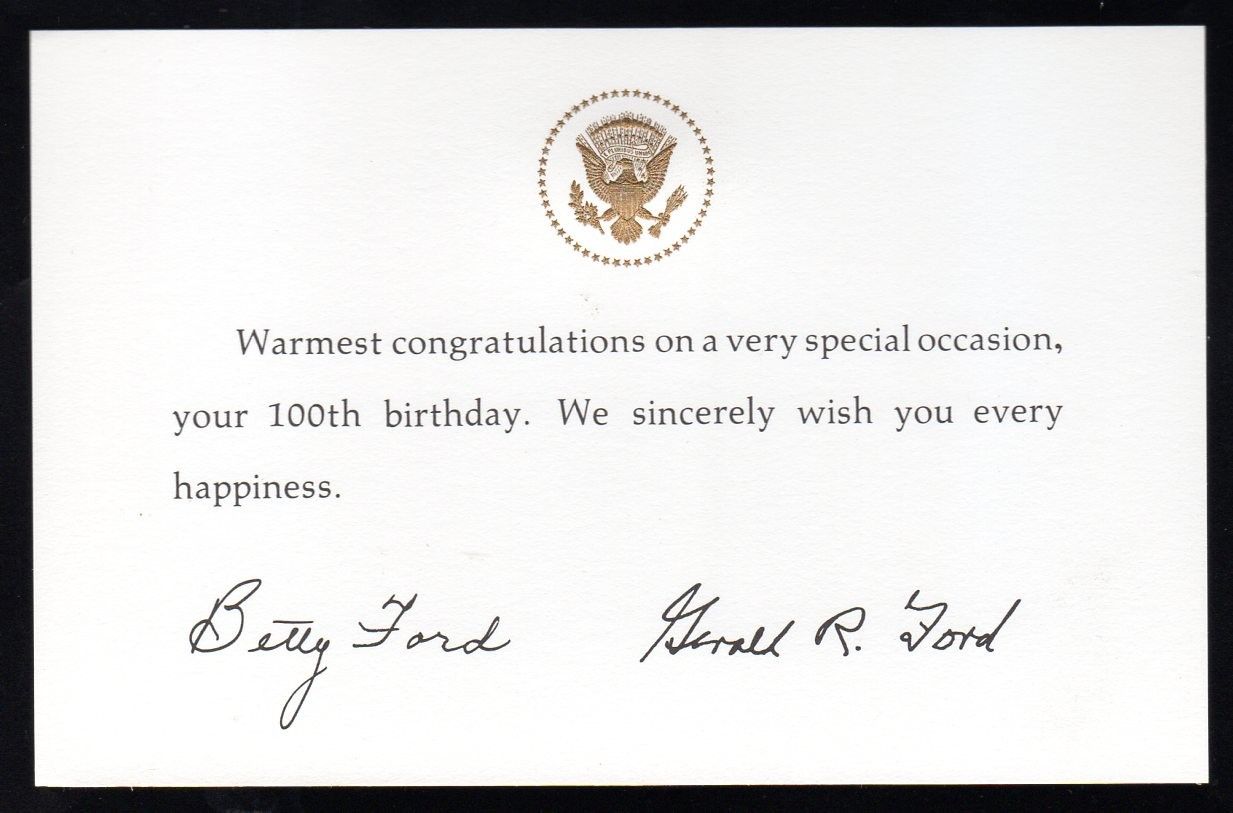
Greeting card sent by United States President Gerald Ford and First Lady Betty Ford

As of 2019, there were an estimated 72,000 centenarians living in the U.S.; the 2020 census officially counted 80,139, and the 2010 census had 53,364. However, the U.S. Census Bureau claimed in 1999 that as many as a third of people stating their age as over 100 might be exaggerating.

In the United States, centenarians may request a letter of congratulation from the president of the United States to mark their longevity.

Strom Thurmond became the first sitting Senator to reach 100 on 5 December 2002.

Jimmy Carter became the first former president to reach the age of 100 on 1 October 2024.

Today also presents a segment honoring centenarians and older, sponsored by Smuckers. The tradition was created in 1983 by weather presenter Willard Scott, and is now presented by his successor Al Roker.

In the state of New Mexico, centenarians have been exempt from state income tax since tax year 2002, if they are not dependents of another taxpayer.

== Asia ==
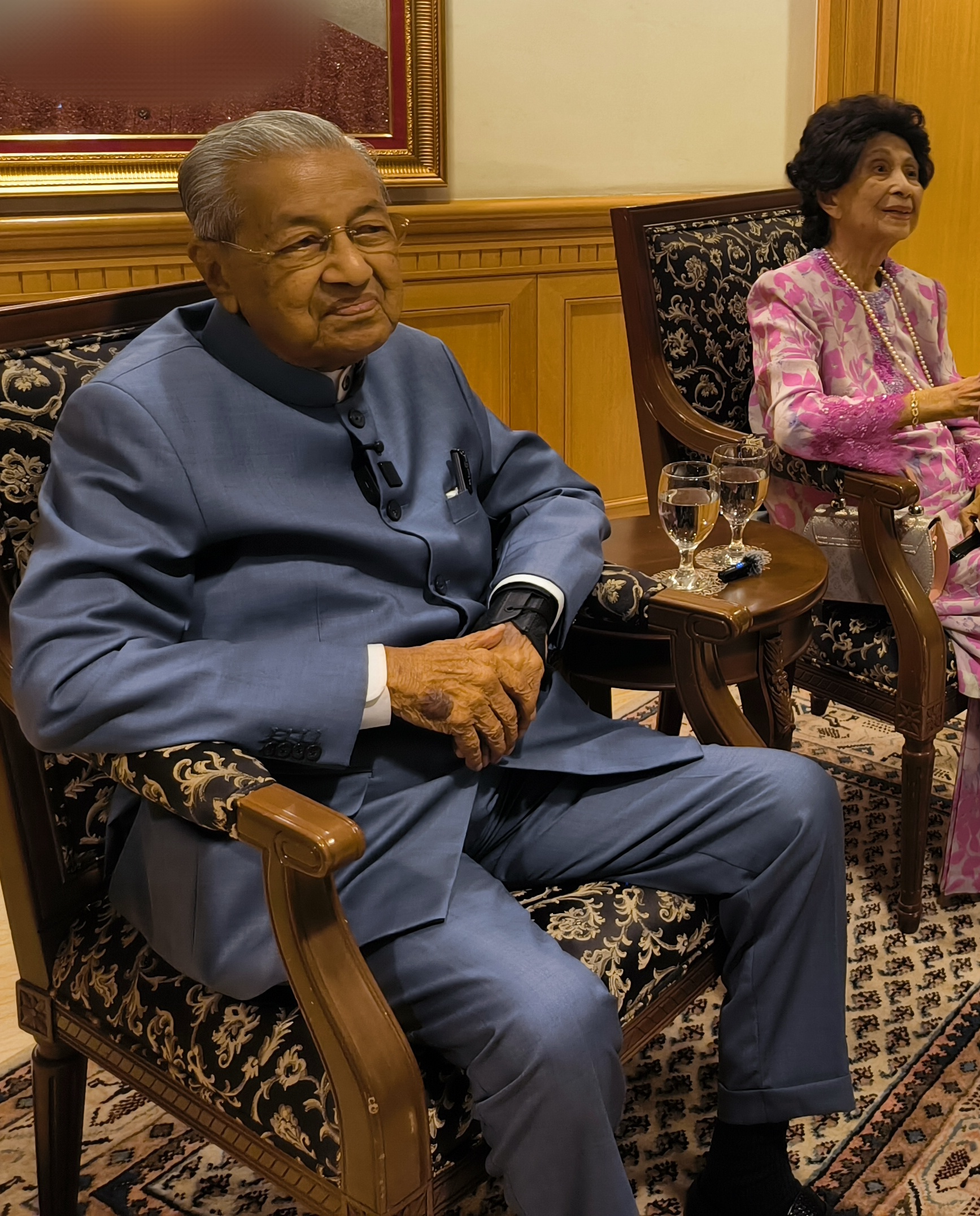
Former prime minister of Malaysia Mahathir Mohamad pictured alongside his wife, Siti Hasmah, during his 100th birthday celebration. At the age of 101, Mahathir is currently the second-oldest living former state leader in the world.

Japanese centenarians receive a silver cup and a certificate from the prime minister of Japan upon the Respect for the Aged Day following their 100th birthday, honouring them for their longevity and prosperity in their lives.

In Madhya Pradesh, India, the award known as Shatayu Samman is given out to people who live at least 100 years to promote awareness of good health.

North Korean centenarians receive a birthday congratulatory letter from the Supreme Leader of the DPRK. On 6 July 2022, Pak Hak Sil, a centenarian living in Koup-ri of Kangnam County, Pyongyang, received a birthday letter sent by Kim Jong Un.

In the Philippines, Republic Act No. 10868 better known as the Centenarians Act of 2016 mandates that all living Filipinos residing in the Philippines or overseas receive a birthday congratulatory letter from the President of the Philippines and a ₱100,000 "Centenarian Gift" from the Department of Social Welfare and Development (DSWD).

In Taiwan, people aged 100 or above receive a golden pendant necklace on Chong Yang Festival each year from the president and Ministry of Health and Welfare.

Mahathir Mohamad became the first prime minister of Malaysia to reach the age of 100 on 10 July 2025. His wife, Siti Hasmah, reached the age of 100 on 12 July 2026; before passing away two months later due to heart failure.

== Africa ==
In countries such as Kenya, Lesotho, Mauritius, Nigeria, South Africa, Zambia, and Zimbabwe centenarians are often celebrated upon reaching their 100th Birthday by the locals and government.

Former Senegalese President, Abdoulaye Wade, turned 100 on 29 May 2026, becoming the first state leader in West African history to become a centenarian.

== Europe ==
German centenarians receive a letter of congratulations from the president of Germany.

In Ireland, centenarians can receive a €2,540 "Centenarians' Bounty" and a letter from the president of Ireland, even if they are resident abroad. Irish people celebrating their 101st birthday may also receive a special silver minted coin with a quote by a famous Irish writer or poet.

Centenarians born in Italy receive a letter of congratulations from the president of Italy.

In the Netherlands, the monarch and their commissioner sends a letter on the 100th birthday and on every birthday beginning with the 105th.

Swedish centenarians receive a telegram from the king and queen of Sweden.

== South America ==
In June 2026, three Brazilian sisters with a combined age of 313, were recognized by Guinness as the oldest living trio of siblings in the world. The sisters, 103, 104 and 106 years old live, in Rio de Janeiro. They were discovered through a global organization that verifies longevity records, called LongeviQuest. Researchers are interested in not only the environmental, but also the genetic components that contribute to longevity. Ben Meyers, the CEO of LongeviQuest stated "When sisters reach that age, there is clearly a strong genetic component. But because they live near each other, they also have a support network, with family able to help when needed. There is definitely a community aspect as well."

== British and Commonwealth realms ==
In Commonwealth realms, including the United Kingdom, Canada, Australia and New Zealand, centenarians can receive congratulatory cards from the monarch, currently King Charles III, on their 100th birthday. In the UK, greeting cards are also sent by the monarch on every birthday beginning with the 105th.

In Commonwealth realms in which the monarch does not ordinarily reside, honorees can also receive congratulations from the governor-general. In Canada, application must be made through the GGS official website. Similarly, in New Zealand, honorees must apply for greetings through the official government website.

=== British traditions ===
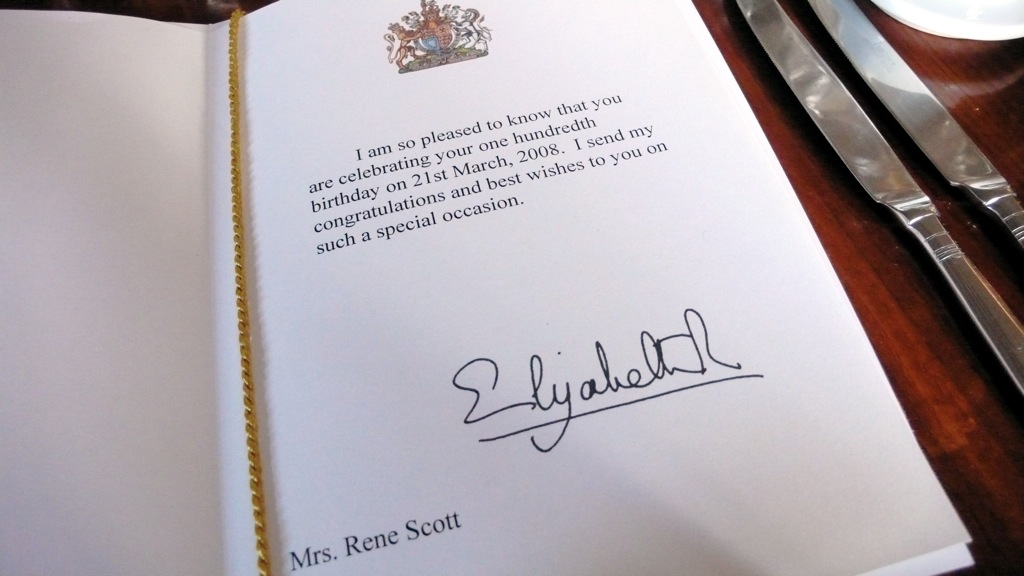
Queen Elizabeth II sent a greeting card to centenarians as a congratulations.

The traditions of British centenarians receiving greetings and congratulations was established by King Edward VII in 1908.

The famous acrobat and tightrope walker Henry Johnson received a congratulatory letter from Edward VII via his royal courtier Viscount Knollys in 1906. The tradition of royal congratulations continued in 1908, when the secretary for King Edward VII sent a congratulatory letter to Reverend Thomas Lord of Horncastle, Lincolnshire, in a newspaper clipping, declaring, "I am commanded by the King to congratulate you on the attainment of your hundredth year, after a most useful life."

The practice was formalised from 1917, under the reign of King George V, who also sent congratulations then sent by a telegram on the attainment of a diamond wedding anniversary (or jubilee) marking 60 years of marriage.

During the reign of King George V, only 24 telegrams were sent; however, with the aging population, this increased to 273 during 1952, when Queen Elizabeth II ascended the throne. The Queen also sent a telegram, and later a portrait-style greeting card with the notation, "I am so pleased to know that you are celebrating your one hundredth birthday. I send my congratulations and best wishes to you on such a special occasion." Each few years the card was updated with a current updated picture of the Queen to ensure people did not receive the same card more than once. The Queen further sent her congratulations on one's 105th birthday and every year thereafter as well as on special wedding anniversaries.

== Centenarians in antiquity ==
While the number of centenarians per capita was much lower in ancient times than today, the data suggest that they were not unheard of.

Estimates of life expectancy in antiquity are far lower than modern values largely due to the far greater incidence of deaths in infancy or childhood, though adult mortality was also considerably greater than today. The assumption of what constitutes "old age", or being "elderly", at least, seems to have remained unchanged since antiquity, the line being generally drawn at either sixty or sixty-five years; Psalm 90:10 in the Hebrew Bible appears to give seventy to eighty years as the natural life expectancy of a person surviving into old age, "The years of our life are seventy, or even by reason of strength eighty".

A survey of the lifespans of male individuals with entries in the Oxford Classical Dictionary (i.e., a sample pre-selected to include those who lived long enough to attain historical notability) found a median lifespan of 72 years, and a range of 32 to 107 years, for 128 individuals born before 100 BC (though the same study found a median lifespan of 66 years for 100 individuals born after 100 BC but no later than 602 AD); by comparison, male individuals listed in Chambers Biographical Dictionary who died between 1900 and 1949 had a median lifespan of 71.5 years, with a range between 29 and 105 years. But as indicated above, far fewer in antiquity survived even from early adulthood to such advanced age – probably under a fifth, compared to a global average of two-thirds today.

The author of a 1994 study concluded that it was only in the second half of the 20th century that medical advances have extended the life expectancy of those who live into adulthood. though this is flatly contradicted by 19th- and early 20th-century census and registration data and by estimates for medieval and ancient populations: US and English expectation of remaining years at age 15 for example rose from about 44 in the mid-19th century to 56 by 1950, and has since increased to 65–67; for English landholders (a relatively privileged group) it was 33 years c.1300, while Ulpian's life table for ancient Rome indicates only 30 years.

Reliable references to individuals in antiquity who lived past 100 years are quite rare, but they do exist. For instance, Cicero's wife Terentia was reported by Pliny the Elder to have lived from 98 BC to 6 AD, 103 years. Regnal dates of Bronze Age monarchs are notoriously unreliable; the sixth dynasty Egyptian ruler Pepi II is sometimes listed as having lived c. 2278 – c. 2184 BC, as he is said to have reigned for 94 years, but alternative readings cite a reign of just 64 years. Adad-guppi, mother of the last king of the Neo-Babylonian Empire Nabonidus apparently lived from c. 648-544 BC (c. 104 years) according to inscriptions on funeral steles. Zhao Tuo, a Qin Dynasty general, reportedly lived to age 103. Tuoba Liwei also reportedly lived to 103. Marcus Valerius Corvus reportedly lived to 100.

Diogenes Laërtius (c. AD 250) gives one of the earliest references regarding the plausible centenarian longevity given by a scientist, the astronomer Hipparchus of Nicaea (c. 185 – c. 120 BC), who, according to the doxographer, said that the philosopher Democritus of Abdera (c. 470/460 – c. 370/360 BC) lived 109 years. Other ancient accounts of Democritus agree that the philosopher lived at least 90 years. The case of Democritus differs from those of, for example, Epimenides of Crete (7th and 6th centuries BC), who is said to have lived an implausible 154, 157, or 290 years, depending on the source.

Other ancient Greek philosophers thought to have lived beyond the age of 90 include Xenophanes of Colophon (c. 570/565 – c. 475/470BC), Pyrrho of Ellis (c. 360 – c. 270 BC), Gorgias of Leontinoi, and Eratosthenes of Cirene (c. 285 – c. 190 BC). Also, the Greek rhetorician Isocrates of Athens (436–338 BC) lived 97/98 years and the famous Greek tragedian Sophocles (497/496-406/405 BC) lived at least 90 years.

Hosius of Córdoba, the man who convinced Constantine the Great to call the First Council of Nicaea, reportedly lived to age 102.

A rare record of an ordinary person who lived to be a centenarian is the tombstone of Roman British legionary veteran Julius Valens, inscribed "VIXIT ANNIS C".

It is believed the 7th century Pope Agatho lived to 103-104, making him the longest lived pope to this day as well as the only pope to become a centenarian.

In the medieval period, Albert Azzo II, Margrave of Milan (d. 1097) is said by Bernold of Constance to have lived past 100 years (iam maior centenario). Also in the medieval period, Ramwood (d. 1000) was known to live 100 years.

== Research ==
Research in Italy suggests that healthy centenarians have high levels of both vitamin A and vitamin E and that this seems to be important in causing their extreme longevity. Other research contradicts this, however, and has found that this theory does not apply to centenarians from Sardinia, for whom other factors probably play a more important role.

A preliminary study carried out in Poland showed that, in comparison with young healthy female adults, centenarians living in Upper Silesia had significantly higher red blood cell glutathione reductase and catalase activities, although serum levels of vitamin E were not significantly higher.

Researchers in Denmark have also found that centenarians exhibit a high activity of glutathione reductase in red blood cells. In this study, the centenarians having the best cognitive and physical functional capacity tended to have the highest activity of this enzyme.

Additional research shows that people whose parents became centenarians have a higher number of naïve B cells. It is known that the children of parents who have a long life are also more likely to reach older age, but it is not clear why, although inherited genes are believed to play an important role. A variation in the gene FOXO3A is known to have a positive effect on the life expectancy of humans, and is found much more often in people living to 100 and beyond – moreover, this appears to be true worldwide.

Men and women who are 100 or older tend to have extroverted personalities, according to Thomas T. Perls, the director of the New England Centenarian Study at Boston University. Centenarians will often have many friends, strong ties to relatives and high self-esteem. In addition, some research suggests that the offspring of centenarians are more likely to age with better cardiovascular health than their peers.

A historical study from Korea found that male eunuchs in the royal court had a centenarian rate of over 3%, and that eunuchs lived on average 14 to 19 years longer than uncastrated men.

=== DNA repair ===
Lymphoblastoid cell lines established from blood samples of centenarians have significantly higher activity of the DNA repair protein PARP (Poly ADP ribose polymerase) than cell lines from younger (20 to 70 years old) individuals. The lymphocytic cells of centenarians have characteristics typical of cells from young people, both in their capability of priming the mechanism of repair after H_{2}O_{2} sublethal oxidative DNA damage and in their PARP capacity. PARP activity measured in the permeabilized mononuclear leukocyte blood cells of thirteen mammalian species correlated with maximum lifespan of the species. These findings suggest that PARP mediated DNA repair activity contributes to the longevity of centenarians, consistent with the DNA damage theory of aging.

=== Japanese bio-study ===
Many experts attribute Japan's high life expectancy to the typical Japanese diet, which is particularly low in refined simple carbohydrates, and to hygienic practices. The number of centenarians in relation to the total population was, in September 2010, 114% higher in Shimane Prefecture than the national average. This ratio was also 92% higher in Okinawa Prefecture. In Okinawa, studies have shown five factors that have contributed to the large number of centenarians in that region:

1. A diet that is heavy on grains, fish, and vegetables and light on meat, eggs, and dairy products.
2. Low-stress lifestyles, which are proven significantly less stressful than that of the mainland inhabitants of Japan.
3. A caring community, where older adults are not isolated and are taken better care of.
4. High levels of activity, where locals work until an older age than the average age in other countries, and more emphasis on activities like walking and gardening to keep active.
5. Spirituality, where a sense of purpose comes from involvement in spiritual matters and prayer eases the mind of stress and problems.

Although these factors vary from those mentioned in the previous study, the culture of Okinawa has proven these factors to be important in its large population of centenarians.

=== Epigenetic studies ===
As more research is conducted on determinants of longevity, the impact of genetics and lifestyle are becoming an important question. Scientists have been looking for the genetic and molecular processes that affect aging. Recent research shows that a relationship exists between aging and genes that work on keeping cells healthy and support their most basic functions, cell metabolism and maintenance.

By measuring the biological age of various tissues from centenarians, researchers may be able to identify tissues that are protected from aging effects. According to a study of 30 different body parts from centenarians and younger controls, the cerebellum is the youngest brain region (and probably body part) in centenarians (about 15 years younger than expected) according to an epigenetic biomarker of tissue age known as epigenetic clock.

These findings could explain why the cerebellum exhibits fewer neuropathological hallmarks of age related dementias compared to other brain regions. Further, the offspring of semi-supercentenarians (subjects who reached an age of 105–109 years) have a lower epigenetic age than age-matched controls (age difference=5.1 years in peripheral blood mononuclear cells) and centenarians are younger (8.6 years) than expected based on their chronological age.

== See also ==
- Food choice of older adults
- Lists of centenarians
- Life extension
- List of oldest people
- New England Centenarian Study
- Okinawa Centenarian Study
- Queensland Community Care Network, which operates the centenarians-only 100+ club
