= New England Centenarian Study =

Study of centenarians in the Boston area

The New England Centenarian Study is a study of persons aged 100 and over (centenarians) in the Boston area.

The study began in 1994 and was originally focused on research into Alzheimer's. However, it soon became apparent that most centenarians did not have Alzheimer's even though other forms of dementia were common, so it transitioned into finding out why some people can live to 100 and others do not. Some findings included that centenarians had natural advantages, including large platelet size. Studies for genes managed to identify only one major gene associated with longevity.

Researchers are now investigating more detailed genetic analysis including epigenetics. Formerly located at Harvard University, the Study is now located at Boston University and led by Dr. Tom Perls.

In 2006, an offshoot, the New England Supercentenarian Study, was begun.

A study of gene tests of hundreds of centenarians reported in July 2010 that genetics plays an extremely important role in deciding who reaches that age. Centenarians rarely develop diseases of aging, and are more likely to bounce back from diseases. Led by Perls, the study was funded by the National Institute on Aging's Division of Geriatrics and Clinical Gerontology.

== See also ==
- Ageing
- Gerontology
- Okinawa Centenarian Study
- Research into centenarians
- Supercentenarian
