= Coral calcium =

Salt of calcium derived from fossilized coral reefs

Coral calcium is a salt of calcium derived from fossilized coral reefs (primarily from limestone and coastal deposits). It has been promoted as an alternative, but unsubstantiated, treatment or cure for a number of health conditions.

== Calcium supplement ==
Coral calcium is a salt of calcium derived from fossilized coral reefs. Coral calcium is composed of calcium carbonate and trace minerals. Claims for health benefits unique to coral calcium have been discredited. Coral calcium, marketed as a cure for various diseases and linked to Okinawan longevity, is merely calcium carbonate and can be considered a calcium supplement, and it supposed superiority to regular calcium carbonate has not been proven. The Okinawa Centenarian Study (OCS) in 2003 clarified that Okinawan longevity is due to a healthy lifestyle, not coral calcium. The OCS did not endorse coral calcium due to its cost, lack of scientific evidence supporting health claims, and environmental concerns about coral reefs. In 2004, the US Federal Trade Commission prohibited the marketers from making unsupported health claims about coral calcium.

== Health claims ==
Coral calcium has been promoted as an alternative treatment or cure for a number of health conditions, often as part of an alkaline diet, by Robert Barefoot and others; Barefoot coauthored a book called The Calcium Factor, and marketed coral calcium supplements with infomercials. According to a Time magazine article about Barefoot by Leon Jaroff, "The monthly cost of the recommended dose of Barefoot's calcium tablets is some 15 times greater than that of the ordinary drug store variety." Jaroff called Barefoot's marketing of coral calcium "one of the more successful scams of our age" and "sheer nonsense," and labeled him a "huckster".

There is no medical evidence to support these health claims, and coral calcium has been identified by the United States Food and Drug Administration as a "Fake Cancer 'Cure' Consumers Should Avoid". The Federal Trade Commission prosecuted several individuals, including Barefoot, for making unsupported health claims about coral calcium, and the National Center for Complementary and Alternative Medicine has issued a consumer advisory regarding false and misleading marketing claims associated with coral calcium supplements.

== Health and environmental concerns ==
Living coral reefs are endangered and cannot be harvested without significant damage to the ecosystem, and because of this, coral calcium is harvested by grinding up above-ground limestone deposits that were once part of a coral reef. Calcium from coral sources needs to be refined to remove pollutants of the source environment. It is marketed as a dietary supplement, but its benefits over other calcium supplements are unproven and biologically unlikely, and several marketers have been found guilty of fraud and were ordered to pay $20.4 million and to refrain from making unsubstantiated claims in the future. Additionally, coral near Okinawa has absorbed relatively high amounts of lead and mercury, leading to concern that these unregulated supplements may be contaminated. Further, coral takes millennia to grow, leading to environmental concerns if harvesting of live coral becomes widespread.

== See also ==
- List of ineffective cancer treatments
- Calcium supplement
