= Mnohaya lita =

Traditional Ukrainian celebratory song

A mnohaya lita (Ukrainian: Многая літа, lit. '"Many years"' or the implied meaning "Wishing you many years of life") is a traditional Ukrainian celebratory song. The song is based on both the Greek: Εις πολλά έτη, romanized: Eis polla etē, lit. '"Many Years to You"' and on the Byzantine Rite polychronion (from the Church Slavonic: мъногаꙗ лѣта, romanized: mŭnogaja lěta) or the hierarchical acclamation Ton Despotin, which is normally sung at the end of church services. The song is also sung at informal gatherings (such as birthdays or name days) and at formal events, such as weddings, church events or other celebrations.

Many variations of the melody are in use, but the lyrics in most cases stay the same (i.e., repeating Mnohaya lita). It remains an integral part of Ukrainian diaspora culture long after assimilation.

== Similar songs ==
The song serves the same function as "Happy Birthday To You" or "For He's a Jolly Good Fellow". As a secular song, its message is similar to that of the Polish "Sto lat" ("One Hundred Years") and is traditionally sung to a person to express wishes of good health and long life.

== Lyrics ==
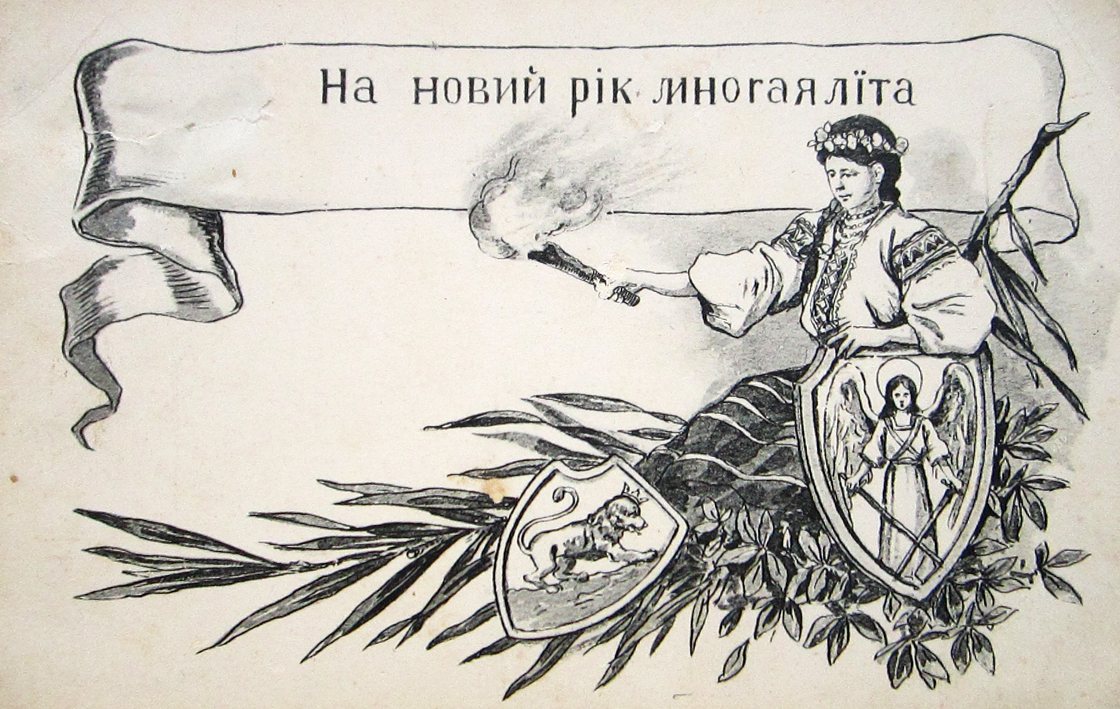
A 1906 Ukrainian postcard containing the phrase

Traditional lyrics repeat the same words:

Многая літа, Многая літа,
Многая літа, Многая літа,
Многая літа, Многая літа,
Многая, Многая літa.

Translation:

Many years, Many years,
Many years, Many years,
Many years, Many years,
Many, Many years.

Alternative lyrics include a more religious undertone:

Многая літа, літа, многая літа!
Многая літа, літа, многая літа!
Во здравіє во спасеніє!
Многая, многая літа!

Translation:

Many years, years, Many years,
Many years, years, Many years,
In health, in salvation!
Many, Many years!

== Use as a phrase ==
The phrase "Mnohaya lita" is sometimes accompanied with Благая / "Blahaya" ("Blessed"). For example, when a priest says, "... Mnohaya i blahaya lita," the congregation sings in response, "Mnohaya lita".

When celebrating someone's birthday, you could say "Mnohaya lita" to them (equivalent to saying "Happy Birthday" in English).
