= Eternal Rest =

Western Christian prayer

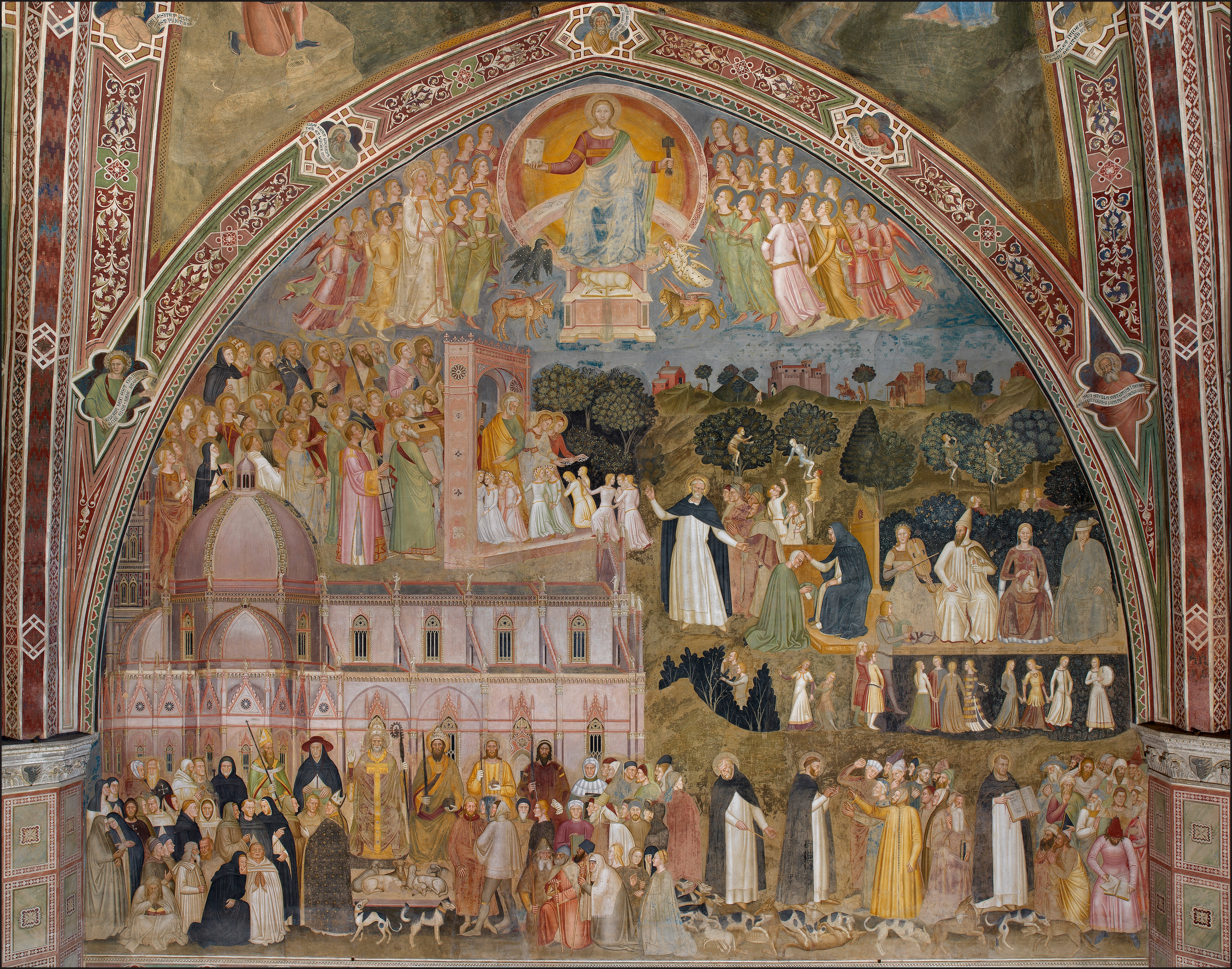
The Church Militant and the Church Triumphant, fresco by Andrea da Firenze in Santa Maria Novella, c. A.D. 1365

Eternal Rest or Requiem aeternam is a Western Christian prayer for the dead. It asks God:

1. To hasten the progression of the souls of the faithful departed in Purgatory to their place in Heaven (in Catholicism)
2. To rest in the love of God the souls of the faithful departed in Paradise until the resurrection of the dead and Last Judgement (in Catholicism, Lutheranism, Anglicanism and Methodism)

The prayer is cited from 2 Esdras (4 Esdras Vulgate):

Therefore, I say to you, O nations that hear and understand, “Wait for your shepherd; he will give you everlasting rest, because he who will come at the end of the age is close at hand. Be ready for the rewards of the kingdom, because perpetual light will shine on you forevermore. -2 Esdras 2:34-35 NRSV

== Theology ==
This Catholic doctrine is found in the Catechism of the Catholic Church, paragraphs 1030-1032:

All who die in God's grace and friendship, but still imperfectly purified, are indeed assured of their eternal salvation; but after death they undergo purification, so as to achieve the holiness necessary to enter the joy of heaven. The Church gives the name Purgatory to this final purification of the elect, which is entirely different from the punishment of the damned...From the beginning the Church has honoured the memory of the dead and offered prayers in suffrage for them, above all the Eucharistic sacrifice, so that, thus purified, they may attain the beatific vision of God. The Church also commends almsgiving, indulgences, and works of penance undertaken on behalf of the dead.

The Lutheran cleric Richard Futrell wrote that "The historic practice within the Lutheran Church had prayers for the dead in their Prayer of the Church. For example, if we were to look at a typical Lutheran service during Luther's lifetime, we would find in the Prayer of the Church not only intercessions, special prayers, and the Lord's Prayer, which are still typical today in Lutheran worship, but also prayers for the dead." For those who have died, Martin Luther declared that 'I regard it as no sin to pray with free devotion in this or some similar fashion: Dear God, if this soul is in a condition accessible to mercy, be thou gracious to it. (Luther's Works, Volume 37)

The United Methodist Church teaches the "truth of intercessory prayer for the dead" and that "prayer for the dead has been a widespread practice throughout Christian history [and] is a profound act of love addressed to a God of love".

== Text ==
=== Latin ===
The Latin text in the Roman Rite of the Catholic Church is:

℣. Requiem æternam dona ei (eis), Domine

℟. Et lux perpetua luceat ei (eis):
℣. Requiescat (-ant) in pace.

℟. Amen.

=== English ===
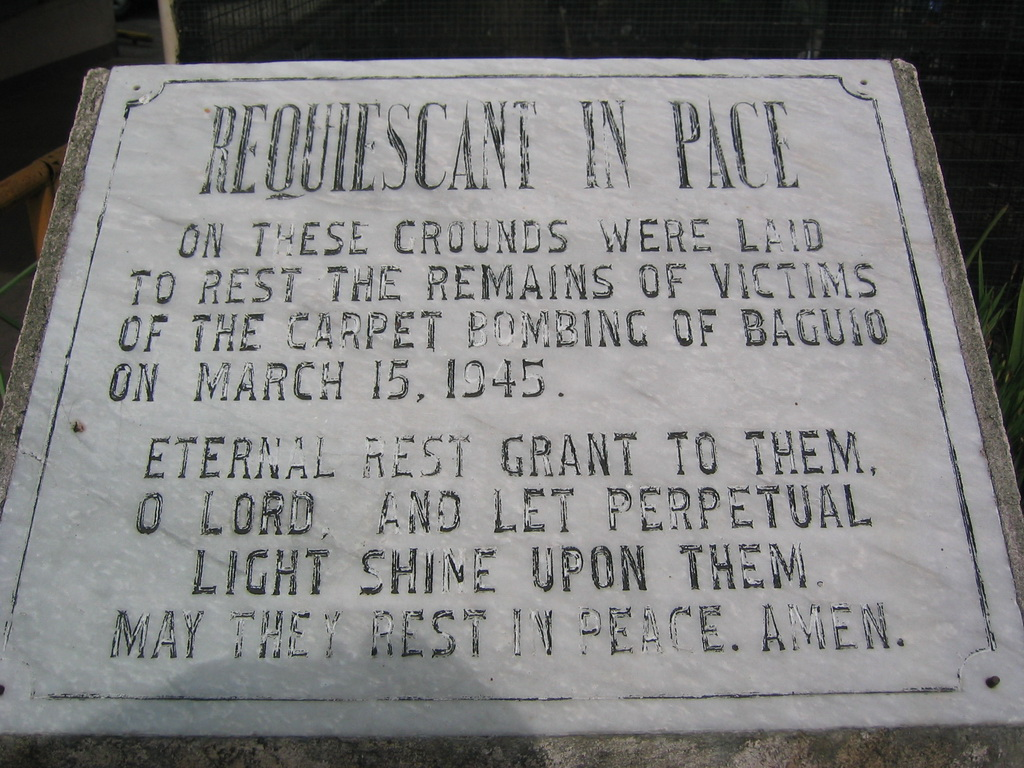
The prayer in a memorial plaque to the 1945 carpet bombing victims buried in the grounds of Baguio Cathedral, Philippines

The translation used by English-speaking Catholics is:

℣. Eternal rest, grant unto him/her, O LORD,
℟. And let perpetual light shine upon him/her.
℣. May he/she rest in peace.
℟. Amen.

The translation used by English-speaking Lutherans is:

℣. Rest eternal grant him/her, O LORD;
℟. and let light perpetual shine upon him/her.
℣. May he/she rest in peace.
℟. Amen.

The translation used by English-speaking Anglicans is:

℣. Rest eternal grant unto them, O LORD:
℟. and let light perpetual shine upon them.
℣. May they rest in peace.
℟. Amen.

A variation of the prayer said by American Methodist clergy during A Service of Death and Resurrection is:

Eternal God,

we praise you for the great company of all those
who have finished their course in faith
and now rest from their labor.
We praise you for those dear to us
whom we name in our hearts before you.
Especially we praise you for Name,
whom you have graciously received into your presence.
To all of these, grant your peace.
Let perpetual light shine upon them;
and help us so to believe where we have not seen,
that your presence may lead us through our years,
and bring us at last with them
into the joy of your home
not made with hands but eternal in the heavens;

through Jesus Christ our Lord. Amen.

== Indulgence ==
In the Catholic Church, there was an indulgence of 300 days for each recitation of the prayer. The indulgence can also be made in favor of the souls in Purgatory.

== See also ==
- Allhallowtide
- In Paradisum
- Memory Eternal
- Office of the Dead
- Requiem Mass
- Rest in peace
- Suffrage Mass
