= Sto lat =

Traditional Polish song

Sto lat (Polish: Sto lat, lit. 'One Hundred Years') is a traditional Polish song that is sung to express good wishes, good health and long life to a person. It is also a common way of wishing someone a happy birthday in Polish.

The song's author and exact origin are unattributed. The song is sung both at informal gatherings (such as birthdays or name days) or at formal events, such as weddings. Frequently, the song "Niech im gwiazdka pomyślności" will be sung afterwards, excluding kids' parties, as the song makes reference to alcohol consumption. At state events it is not unusual to hear it performed by an orchestra or a military band. It is also noted for being an integral part of Polish immigrant culture even long after assimilation.

== Similar songs ==
The song serves the equivalent function of "Happy Birthday to You" or "For He's a Jolly Good Fellow".

== Lyrics ==
The Polish lyrics are:

Sto lat, sto lat
Niech żyje, żyje nam.
Sto lat, sto lat,
Niech żyje, żyje nam,
Jeszcze raz, jeszcze raz,
Niech żyje, żyje nam,
Niech żyje nam!

This translates roughly into English as:

100 years, 100 years,
May they live, live for us!
100 years, 100 years,
May they live, live for us!
Once again, once again,
May they live, live for us!
May they live for us!

After the repetition of the phrase Niech żyje nam, usually A kto? ('But who?') will be collectively shouted, followed by the name of the intended recipient of the wishes. Of the few variations of the optional second verse, the most common one is as follows:

Niech im gwiazdka pomyślności
Nigdy nie zagaśnie!
Nigdy nie zagaśnie!
A kto z nami nie zaśpiewa/wypije,
Niech pod stołem zaśnie!
Niech pod stołem zaśnie!

Which roughly translates to:

May their star of prosperity
Never extinguish!
Never extinguish!
And whoever won't sing/drink with us
May they sleep under the table!
May they sleep under the table!

== Use as a phrase ==
The phrase "Sto lat!" is also often used to wish someone longevity or good fortune, or as a toast, without the song. However, the use of "Sto lat!" in this manner will often lead to the song being sung by those present. The phrase is also sometimes used to acknowledge someone's sneezing – similarly to "God bless you", though for that particular occasion a simple na zdrowie ("To your health") is more frequently used.

== See also ==
- Ten thousand years, translation of a phrase used in many East Asian languages to wish leaders long lives
- Live until 120, similar Jewish saying

In literature, Sto Lat is a fictional city in Terry Pratchett's Discworld Series.
