= Calcium/cholecalciferol =

Combination drug

Combination of
- Calcium in biology: Mineral nutrient
- Cholecalciferol: Vitamin

Clinical data
- Trade names: Calcitrate with D, Citracal + D, others
- AHFS/Drugs.com: Multum Consumer Information
- Routes of administration: By mouth
- ATC code: A12AX (WHO)

Legal status
- Legal status: US: OTC

Identifiers
- CAS Number: 160296-34-4

Calcium/cholecalciferol is a combination of a calcium salt and vitamin D_{3} (cholecalciferol). It is used to prevent and treat lack of calcium and vitamin D in the elderly, as well for osteoporosis in combination with other medications.

In 2023, the combination, calcium/vitamin D was the 261st most commonly prescribed medication in the United States, with more than 1 million prescriptions.

== Adverse effects ==
Possible side effects include gastrointestinal problems, for example nausea and constipation. If very high doses are taken, signs of hypercalcaemia (abnormally high blood calcium levels) have been described, such as stomach pain, vomiting, thirst, and tiredness. Extreme or long-term or overdose can theoretically result in hypervitaminosis D, kidney stones, chronic kidney disease, and calcinosis.

== Interactions ==
Calcium forms complexes with a number of pharmaceutical drugs, reducing their bioavailability; among them are tetracyclines, quinolone antibiotics, levothyroxine, and bisphosphonates, as well as iron, magnesium and zinc supplements. Vitamin D in usual doses has no relevant interactions.
