= Memory Eternal =

Eastern Orthodox and Eastern Catholic Church exclamation at funerals

Memory eternal (Note: Greek: Αἰωνία ἡ μνήμη, Aionía i mními; Arabic: ذِكرُهُ مؤَبَّداً, "Thikruhu muabbadan"; Georgian: საუკუნო ხსენება, "Sauk'uno Khseneba"; Church Slavonic: Вечная память, Vechnaya pamyat’, Ukrainian: Вічная пам'ять (vichnaya pamyat'), Russian: Вечная память (vechnaya pamyat'), Belarusian: Вечная памяць (viečnaja pamiać), Bulgarian: Вечна памет (vechna pamet), Romanian: Veșnica pomenire) is an exclamation, an encomium like the polychronion, used at the end of a Byzantine Rite funeral or memorial service, as followed by the Eastern Orthodox and Eastern Catholic Churches. It is the liturgical counterpart to the Western Rite prayer "Eternal Rest".

== Memorial service ==
The "memory eternal" mentioned in the prayer mainly refers to remembrance by God, rather than by the living, and is another way of praying that the soul has entered heaven and enjoys eternal life. It has been connected to the thief on the cross who asks Jesus to remember him when the kingdom is established, where Jesus responds that the thief would be in paradise (Luke 23:42–43). Hence to be remembered by God, in eternal memory, is to be in eternal existence in paradise.

This chant is parallel to "Many years" which is chanted for living members of the Church (and occasionally for national or local authorities, even though they may not be Orthodox). "Memory eternal" is not chanted for those who have been officially glorified (canonized) as saints. As part of the glorification process for new saints, on the eve of the day before their glorification, "memory eternal" will be chanted for them at the end of a solemn service known as the "Last Requiem".

The chanting of "memory eternal" is introduced by a deacon, as follows:

Deacon: In a blessed falling asleep, grant, O Lord, eternal rest unto Thy departed servant (Name) and make his/her memory to be eternal!
Choir: Memory eternal! Memory eternal! Memory eternal!

It concludes with the line "with the saints, grant her/him rest o Lord, memory eternal!"

== Other occasions ==
"Memory Eternal" is chanted at the end of services on Saturdays of the Dead, though not for an individual, but for all of the faithful departed.

"Memory Eternal" is intoned by the deacon and then chanted by all in response three times during the liturgy on the Sunday of Orthodoxy to commemorate church hierarchs, Orthodox monarchs, Orthodox patriarchs and clergy, and all deceased Orthodox Christians.

In the Russian Orthodox Church, "memory Eternal" is chanted on the Sunday of Orthodoxy for all of the departed rulers of Russia.

== Uses in media ==
- In the ending credits of the HBO's Chernobyl, the chant is used to highlight the human cost of the disaster.
