= Okinawa Centenarian Study =

Japanese study of elderly people

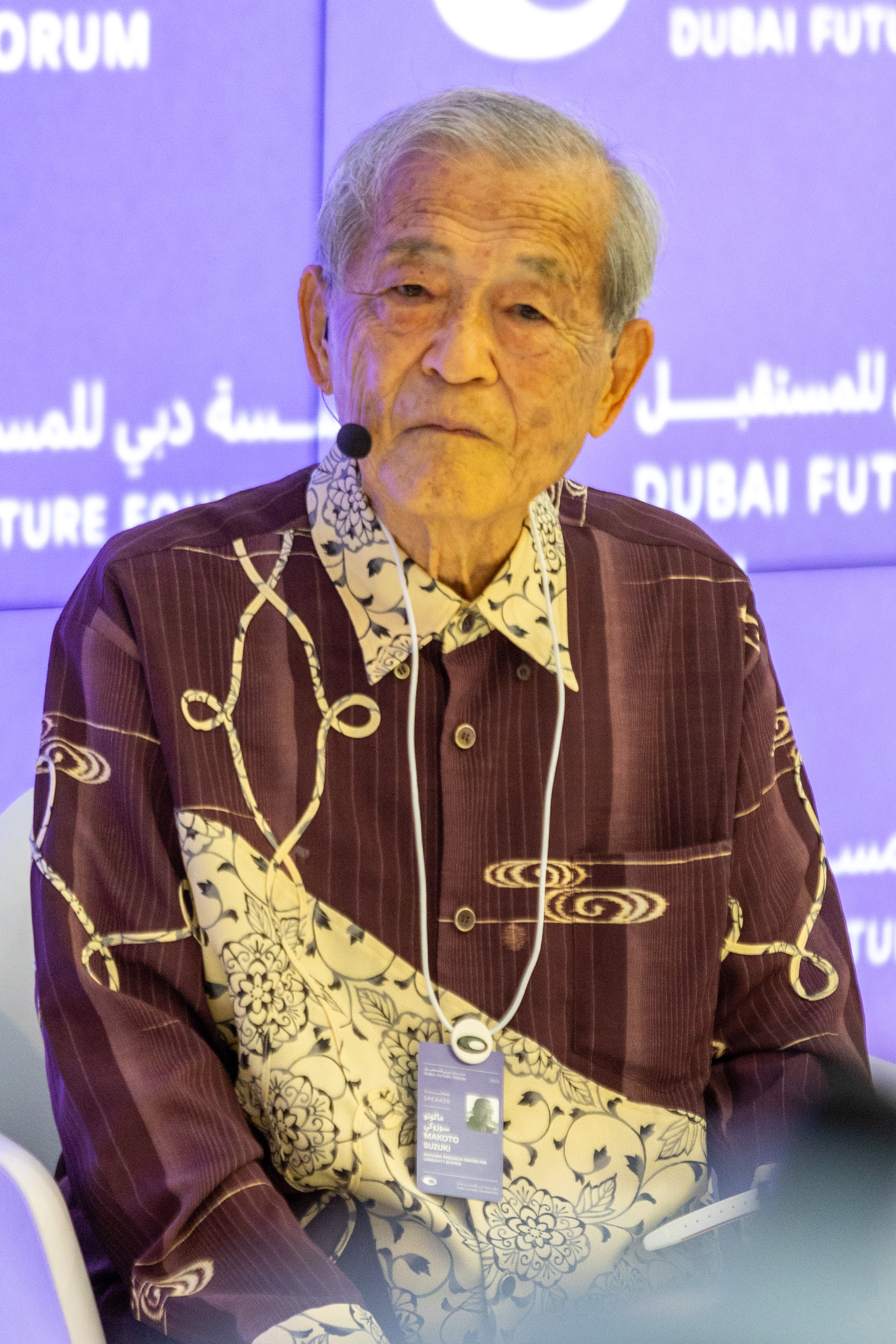
Dr. Makoto Suzuki, Okinawa Research Center for Longevity Science

The Okinawa Centenarian Study is a study of the elderly people of Okinawa, Japan. The study, funded by Japan's ministry of health, is the largest of its kind ever carried out. Over the years, the scientists involved have had access to more than 600 Okinawan centenarians.

Elderly people in Okinawa may have the longest life expectancy in the world. Coronary heart disease, stroke, and cancer, occur in Okinawans with the lowest frequency in the world.

The goal of the study is to find out why this is the case.

Compared to Westerners, the islanders age slowly and are about 80% less likely to get heart disease. They are also a quarter less likely to get breast or prostate cancer. In addition, they have half the risk of getting colon cancer and are less likely than Westerners to get dementia. On average they spend 97% of their lives free of any disabilities.

The research also suggests a strong hereditary component, as female siblings were 2.6 times more likely to reach the age of 90, while male siblings were 5.4 times more likely to reach 90.

== Study design and history ==
The study began in 1976 and, according to its investigators, is the longest-running population-based study of centenarians in the world. By 2006 it had examined more than 900 centenarians in their homes, almost a third of all the centenarians ever recorded in Okinawa Prefecture. Its aim is to identify the genetic and environmental factors behind the longevity of Okinawans, the longest-lived people in Japan. Most of the study's research has been cross-sectional and retrospective. Because it draws participants from the whole population, it avoids some of the bias towards healthier volunteers seen in other centenarian studies.

== Traditional diet ==
The study's investigators have described the traditional Okinawan diet as based mainly on root vegetables, above all the sweet potato. It also included green and yellow vegetables, soy foods and medicinal plants. Fish and other seafood, lean meat, fruit, herbs and spices, tea and alcohol were consumed in moderation. Unlike in mainland Japan, the staple food was the sweet potato rather than rice or other grains. Sweet potatoes supplied more than half of daily calorie intake.

== Changes in later generations ==
Okinawa's longevity advantage has not carried over to younger generations. By the end of the 1980s, improvements in young-adult mortality in Okinawa were found to be lagging. In 2002 the prefecture fell from 4th to 26th of Japan's 47 prefectures for male life expectancy. A 2024 analysis of life tables found a sharp divide between Okinawans born before and after the Second World War. The older generations have very favourable mortality, while younger ones have clearly higher mortality than people in mainland Japan.

The study's investigators link this partly to changes in diet. Older Okinawans largely kept to the traditional diet, but post-war generations moved towards higher-calorie, less nutritious food. Combined with lower physical activity, this has worsened the risk-factor profile of younger Okinawans, especially men. They now have more obesity and other chronic-disease risk factors.

== Criticism and debate ==
The reliability of Okinawan age records has been questioned. Almost all of the original koseki (family registers) were destroyed in the Second World War and rebuilt afterwards in very difficult conditions. Demographer Michel Poulain argued in 2011 that this reconstruction could have introduced errors in recorded ages. He found no concrete evidence that the data were wrong. However, he called for Okinawa's exceptional longevity to be validated more thoroughly, for individuals and for the population as a whole.

"Blue zones" are regions said to have exceptional longevity. Okinawa is one of four blue zones recognised by both of the rival groups that keep such lists. The concept has been challenged by researcher Saul Newman, who argues that a large share of reported centenarians in these areas may not exist. As of 2024, his analysis had circulated as a preprint since 2019 without being published in a journal. Demographers involved in identifying the blue zones issued a letter rebutting his claims.

== See also ==
- Centenarian
- New England Centenarian Study
- Research into centenarians

== Sources ==
- Buettner, D., & Skemp, S. (2016). Blue zones. American Journal of Lifestyle Medicine, 10(5), 318–321. https://doi.org/10.1177/1559827616637066
- Hausman, D. B., Fischer, J. G., & Johnson, M. A. (2011). Nutrition in Centenarians. Maturitas, 68(3), 203–209. https://doi.org/10.1016/j.maturitas.2011.01.003
- Willcox, C., Willcox, B., Hsueh, W.-C., & Suzuki, M. (2024, January 2). Okinawa Centenarian Study D. Craig Willcox, Bradley J. Willcox, Wen-Chi Hsueh & Makoto Suzuki.
