= Live until 120 =

Jewish blessing

The phrase "May you live until 120" (Hebrew: עד מאה ועשרים שנה: Ad me'ah ve-essrim shana; Yiddish: ביז הונדערט און צוואַנציק; Biz hundert un tsvantsik), often written as "till 120", is a traditional Jewish blessing.

The most often cited source is Genesis 6:3: "And the LORD said: 'My spirit shall not abide in man for ever, for that he also is flesh; therefore shall his days be a hundred and twenty years."

Later, in Deuteronomy 34:7, the age of Moses upon his death is given as 120, at which age "his eye had not dimmed, and his vigor had not diminished". The blessing therefore carries the implication that the receiver should retain his full mental and physical faculties to the end of his life.

The saying is a fixture of Jewish humor, as in the story of a man who said to his noisy neighbor "May you live until 119" and then said to the wife "May you live until 120." When asked by the husband "why only until 119", the man who was seeking a bit of quiet said "she deserves one good year". Another joke said is: "What do you say to someone on their 120th birthday? Have a nice day".

This phrase has gained a colloquial addition based on the close sound of Ad me'ah ve-essrim shana and Ad me'ah ke-essrim shana which means "till 100 like 20", meaning to live with the health of a 20 year old till the age of 100.
