= Leschenaultia bicolor =

Scientific classification
- Kingdom: Animalia
- Phylum: Arthropoda
- Class: Insecta
- Order: Diptera
- Family: Tachinidae
- Subfamily: Exoristinae
- Tribe: Goniini
- Genus: Leschenaultia
- Species: L. bicolor

Binomial name
- Leschenaultia bicolor (Macquart, 1846)

Synonyms
- Blepharipeza bicolor Macquart, 1846; Parachaeta fusca Townsend, 1916

Species of fly

Leschenaultia bicolor is a species of bristle fly in the family Tachinidae.

== Hosts ==
It is a parasitoid of Halysidota caterpillars, including Halysidota cinctipes and Halysidota pearsoni.

== Distribution ==
Canada, United States, Puerto Rico, Mexico, Argentina, Brazil, Peru, Venezuela.
