= Amygdalase =

Amygdalase may refer to one of two enzymes:

- Beta-glucosidase
- Amygdalin beta-glucosidase
