= Streptomyces panaciradicis =

Scientific classification
- Domain: Bacteria
- Kingdom: Bacillati
- Phylum: Actinomycetota
- Class: Actinomycetia
- Order: Streptomycetales
- Family: Streptomycetaceae
- Genus: Streptomyces
- Species: S. panaciradicis

Binomial name
- Streptomyces panaciradicis Lee et al. 2014

Type strain
- KACC 17632, NBRC 109811, 1MR-8

Synonyms
- Streptomyces panacradicis

Species of bacterium

Streptomyces panaciradicis is a Gram-positive bacterium species from the genus of Streptomyces which has been isolated from the rhizoplane from a ginseng plant. Streptomyces panaciradicis produces β-glucosidase.

== See also ==
- List of Streptomyces species
