= Leschenaultia halisidotae =

Scientific classification
- Kingdom: Animalia
- Phylum: Arthropoda
- Class: Insecta
- Order: Diptera
- Family: Tachinidae
- Subfamily: Exoristinae
- Tribe: Goniini
- Genus: Leschenaultia
- Species: L. halisidotae

Binomial name
- Leschenaultia halisidotae Brooks, 1947

Species of fly

Leschenaultia halisidotae is a species of bristle fly in the family Tachinidae.

== Hosts ==
It is a parasitoid of moths from the genus Halysidota and Lophocampa.

== Distribution ==
Canada, United States, Mexico.
