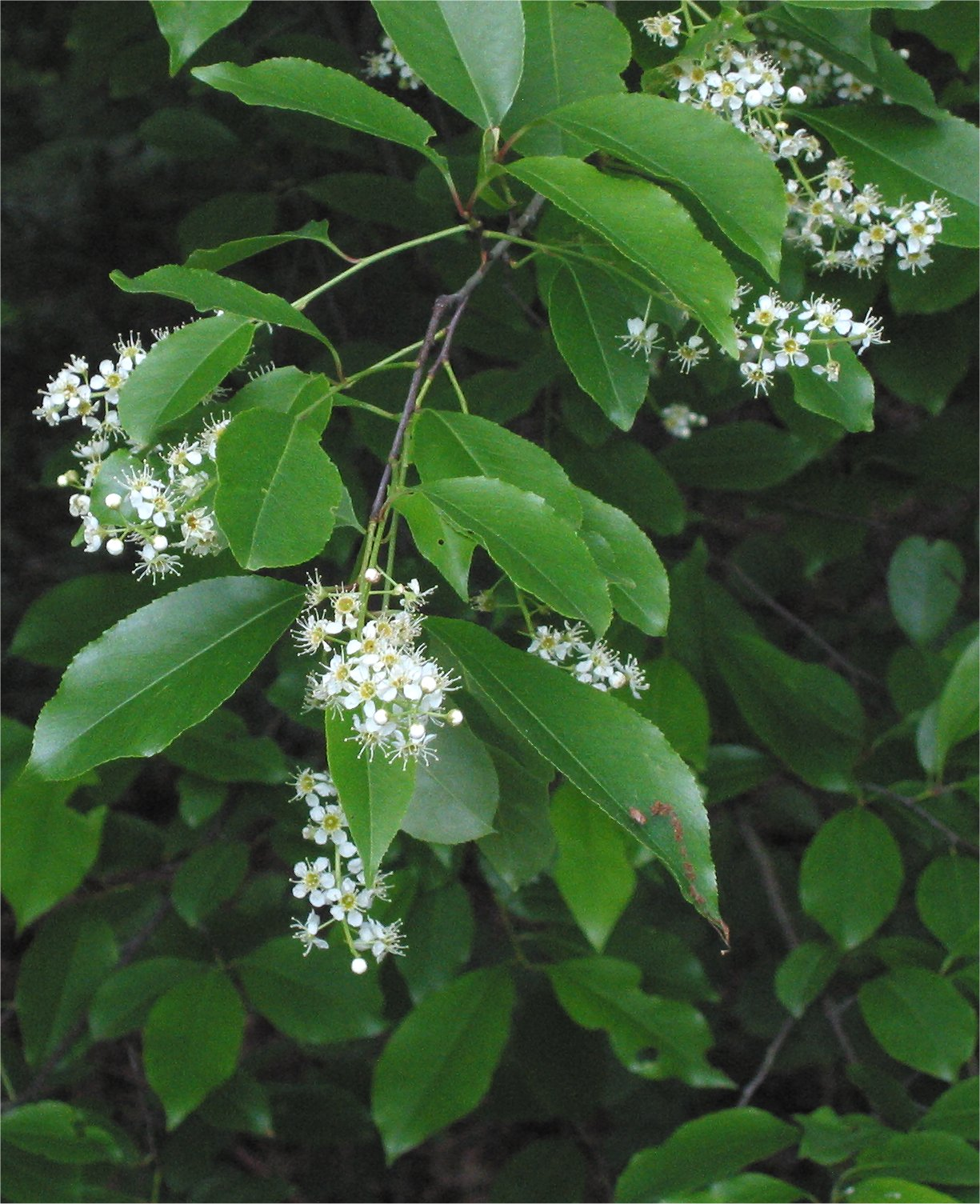
- Flowers and leaves

Conservation status
- Least Concern (IUCN 3.1)

Scientific classification
- Kingdom: Plantae
- Clade: Tracheophytes
- Clade: Angiosperms
- Clade: Eudicots
- Clade: Rosids
- Order: Rosales
- Family: Rosaceae
- Genus: Prunus
- Subgenus: Prunus subg. Padus
- Species: P. serotina

Binomial name
- Prunus serotina Ehrh.
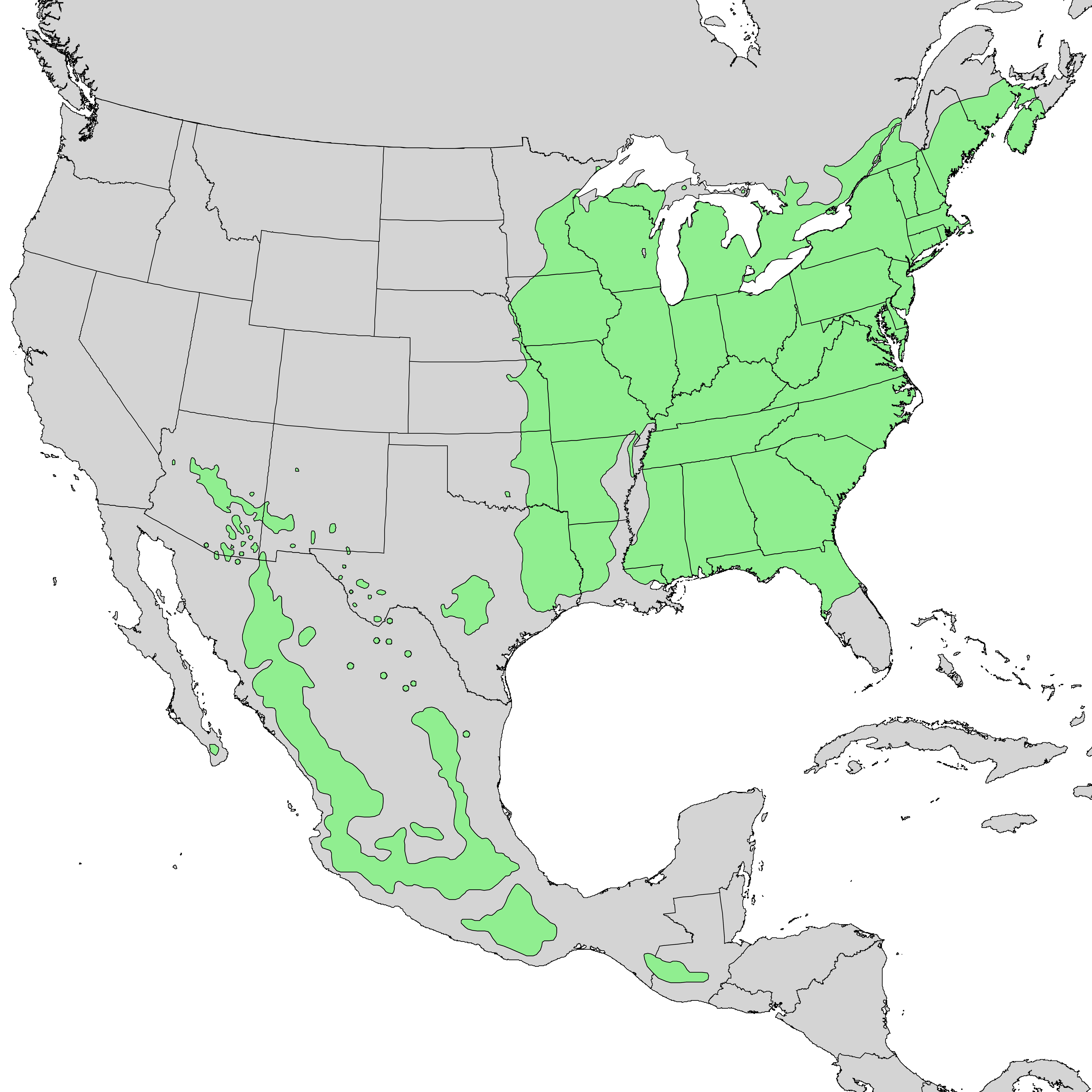
- Natural range

Synonyms
- Cerasus serotina (Ehrh.) Poit. & Turpin; Padus serotina (Ehrh.) Borkh.; Prunus serotina f. typica Schwer.

= Prunus serotina =

Species of tree

Prunus serotina, commonly called black cherry, wild black cherry, rum cherry, or mountain black cherry, is a New World deciduous tree or shrub in the rose family, Rosaceae. Despite its common names, it is not very closely related to commonly cultivated cherries.

== Description ==
Prunus serotina is a medium-sized, fast-growing deciduous forest tree or shrub growing to a height of 15–24 metres (49–79 feet). The leaves are 5–13 centimetres (2–5 inches) long, ovate-lanceolate in shape, with finely toothed margins. The fall leaf color is yellow to red. The flowers are small, white and 5-petalled, in racemes 10–15 cm (4–6 in) long which contain several dozen flowers. The flowers give rise to reddish-black "berries" (drupes) fed on by birds, 5–10 millimetres (1/4–3/8 in) in diameter.

For about its first decade the bark of a black cherry tree is thin, smooth, and banded, resembling a birch. A mature tree has very broken, dark gray to black bark. The leaves are long and shiny, resembling a sourwood's. An almond-like odour is released when a young twig is scratched and held close to the nose, revealing minute amounts of cyanide compounds produced and stored by the plant as a defense mechanism against herbivores.

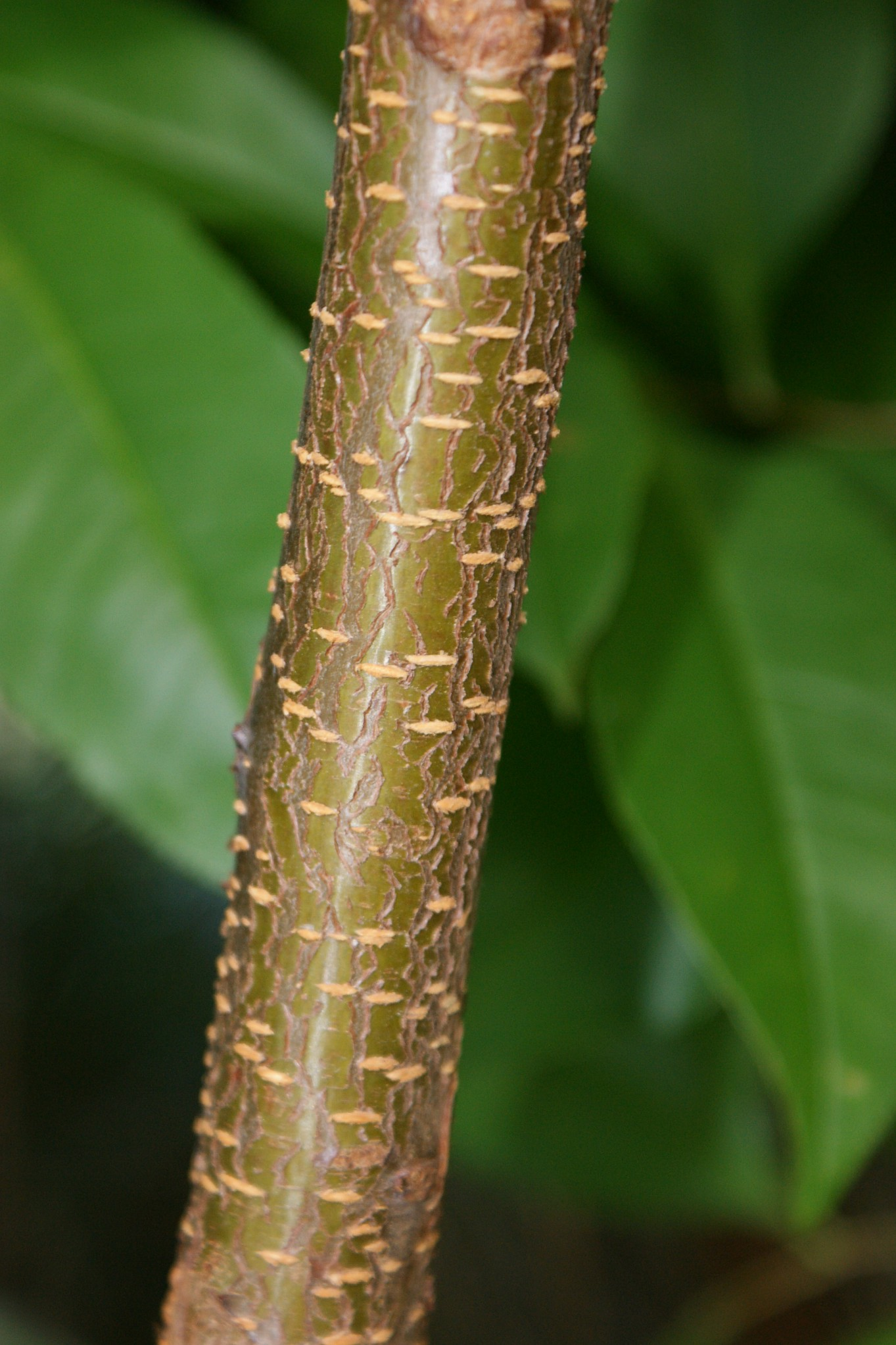
Young bark

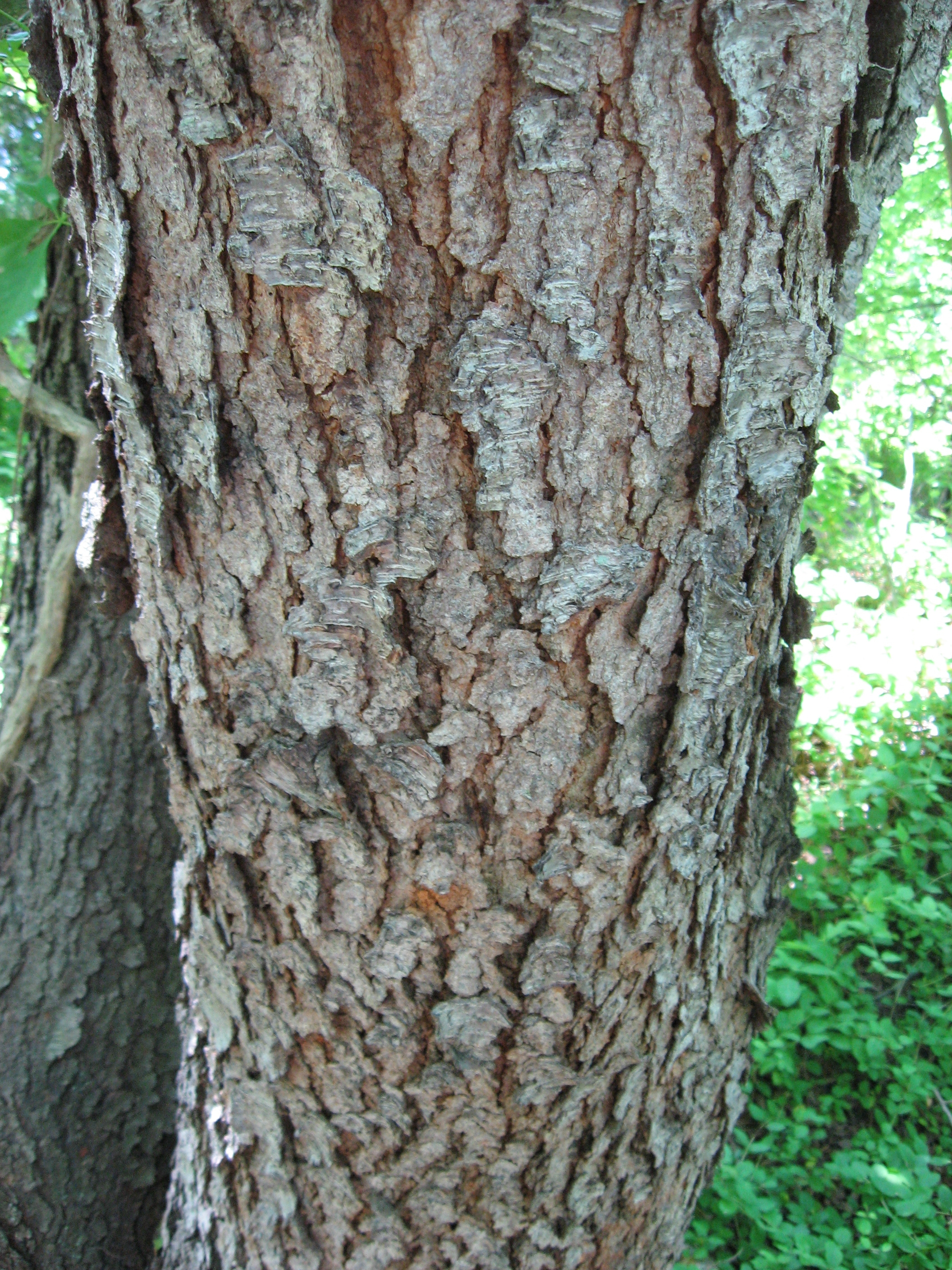
Mature bark

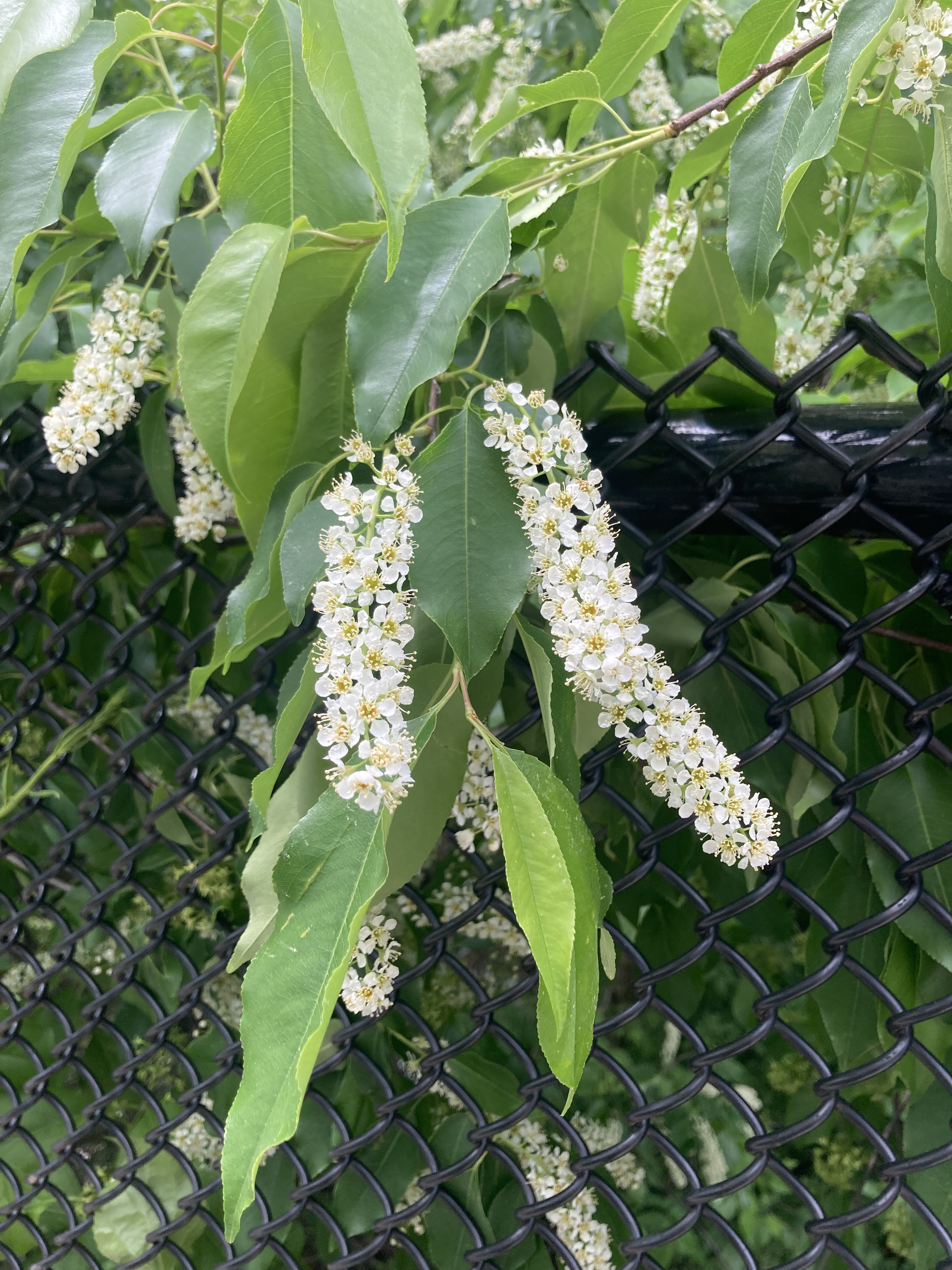
Flower clusters

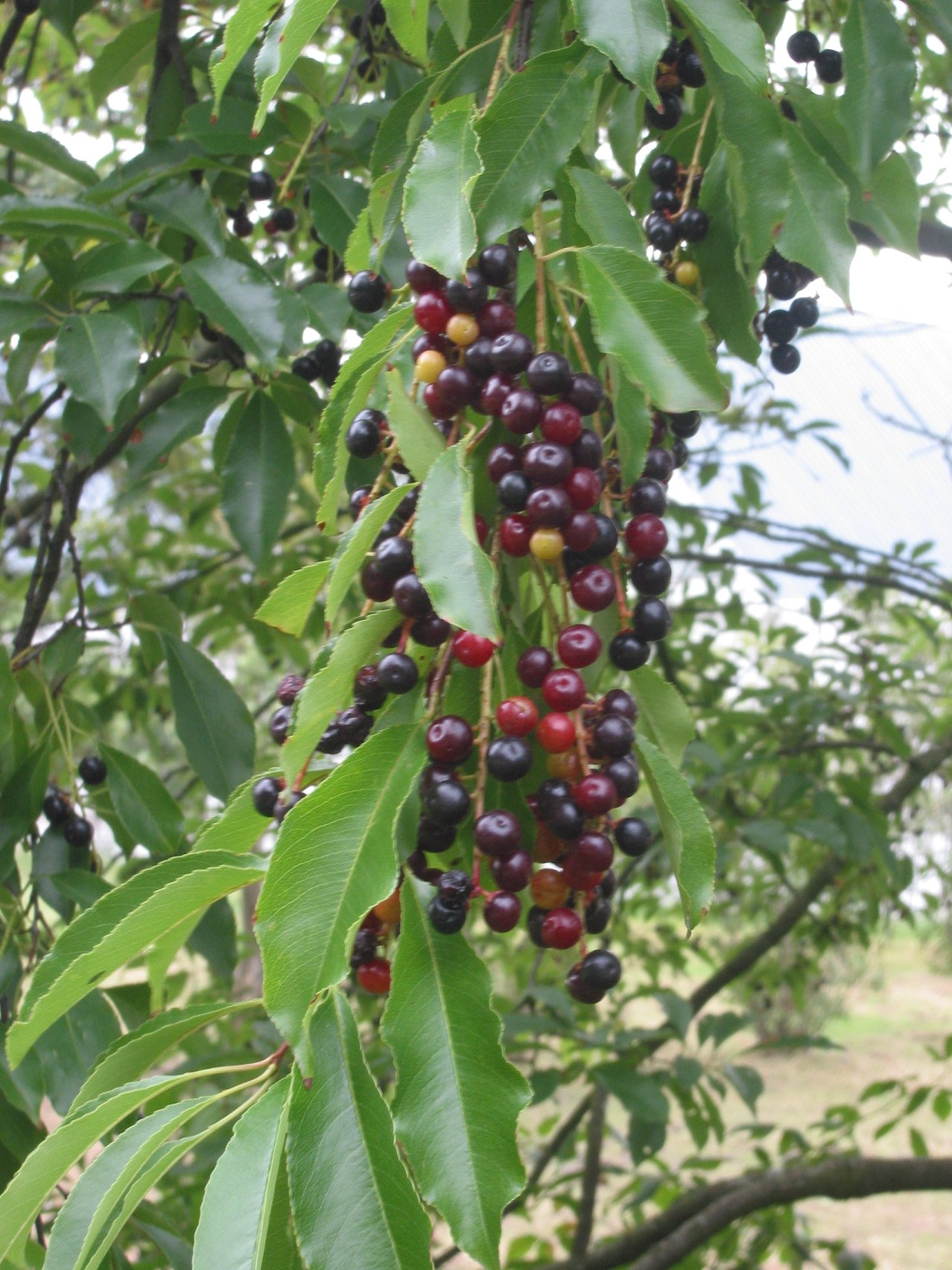
Immature fruit

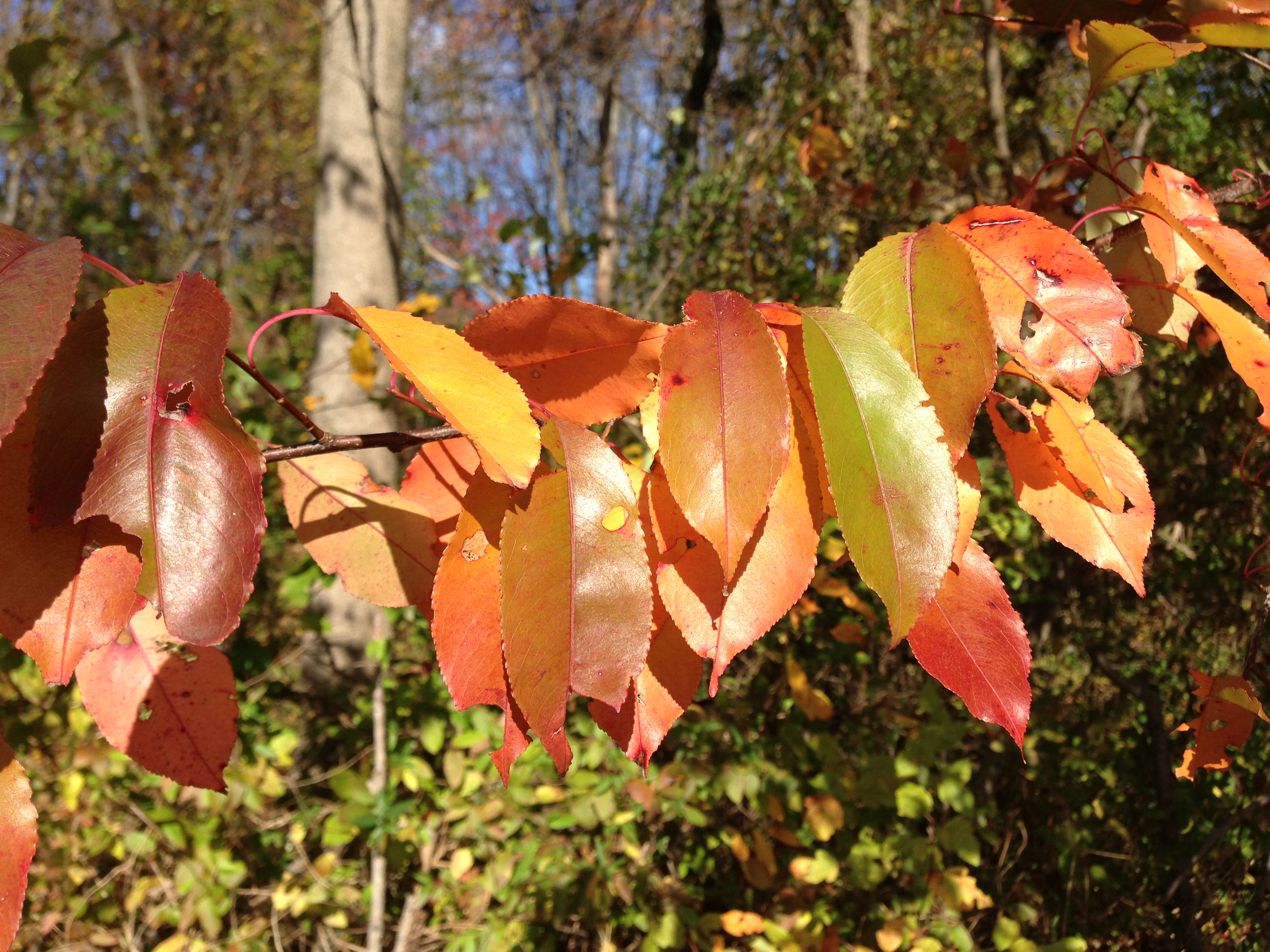
Autumn foliage

=== Biochemistry ===
Like apricots and apples, the seeds of black cherries contain cyanogenic glycosides (compounds that can be converted into cyanide), such as amygdalin. These compounds release hydrogen cyanide when the seed is ground or minced, which releases enzymes that break down the compounds. These enzymes include amygdalin beta-glucosidase, prunasin beta-glucosidase and mandelonitrile lyase. In contrast, although the flesh of black cherries also contains these glycosides, it does not contain the enzymes needed to convert them to cyanide, so the flesh is safe to eat.

The foliage, particularly when wilted, also contains cyanogenic glycosides, which convert to hydrogen cyanide if eaten by animals. Farmers are recommended to remove any trees that fall in a field containing livestock, because the wilted leaves could poison the animals. Removal is not always practical, though, because these trees often grow in very large numbers on farms, taking advantage of the light brought about by mowing and grazing. Entire fencerows can be lined with this poisonous tree, making it difficult to monitor all the branches falling into the grazing area. Black cherry is a leading cause of livestock illness, and grazing animals' access to it should be limited.

=== Similar species ===
Black cherry is closely related to the chokecherry (Prunus virginiana), which tends to be shorter (a shrub or small tree) and has smaller, less glossy leaves.

== Subdivisions ==
Prunus serotina belongs to Prunus subg. Padus and has the following subspecies and varieties:

- Prunus serotina subsp. capuli (Cav. ex Spreng.) McVaugh – central + southern Mexico
- Prunus serotina subsp. eximia (Small) McVaugh – Texas
- Prunus serotina subsp. hirsuta (Elliott) McVaugh (syn. Prunus serotina var. alabamensis (C. Mohr) Little) – southeastern United States
- Prunus serotina subsp. serotina – Canada, United States, Mexico, Guatemala
- Prunus serotina subsp. virens (Wooton & Standl.) McVaugh – southwestern United States, northern + central Mexico
  - Prunus serotina var. virens (Wooton & Standl.) McVaugh
  - Prunus serotina var. rufula (Wooton & Standl.) McVaugh

== Distribution and habitat ==
Prunus serotina is widespread and common in North America and Central America. Prunus serotina subsp. capuli was cultivated in Central and South America well before European contact.

The species was widely introduced into Western and Central Europe in the mid-20th century, where it has become locally naturalized and invasive.

== Ecology ==
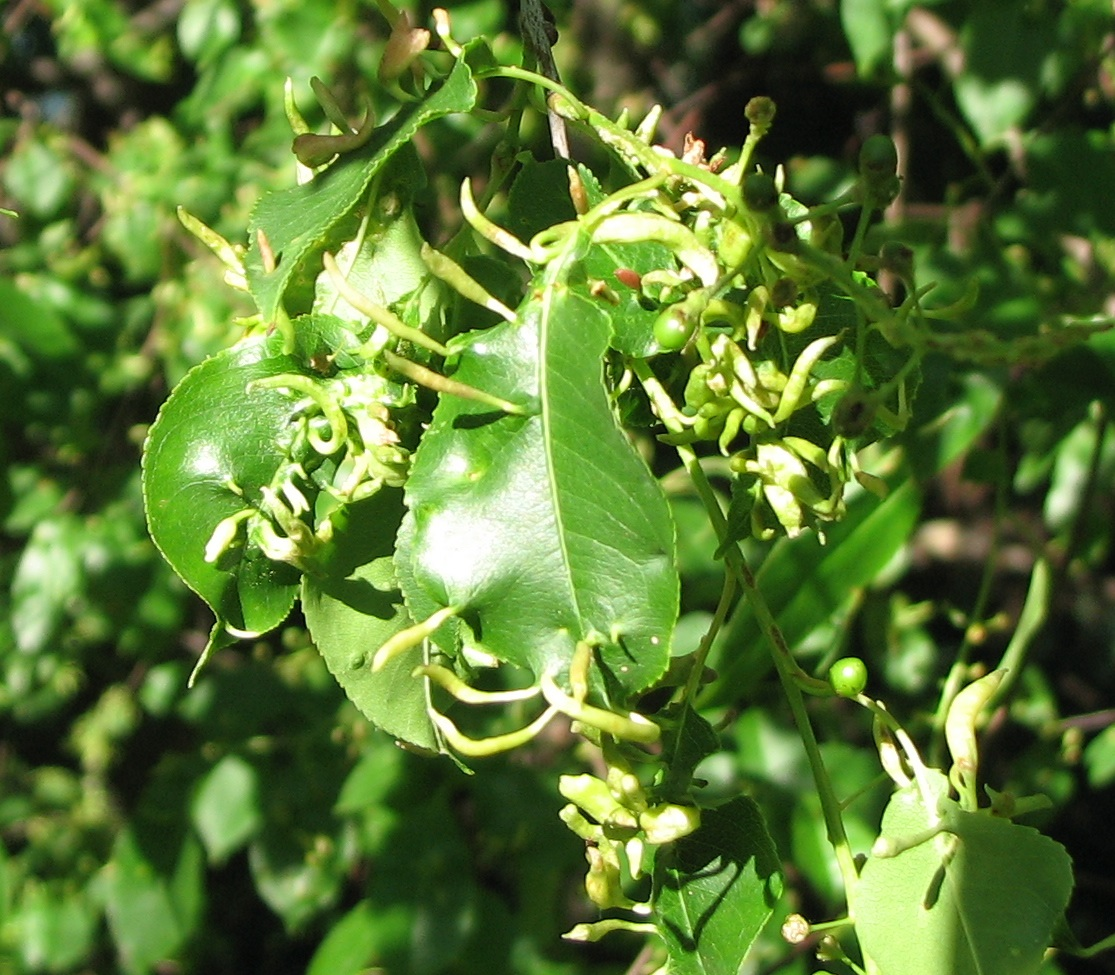
Galls made by the mite Eriophyes cerasicrumena

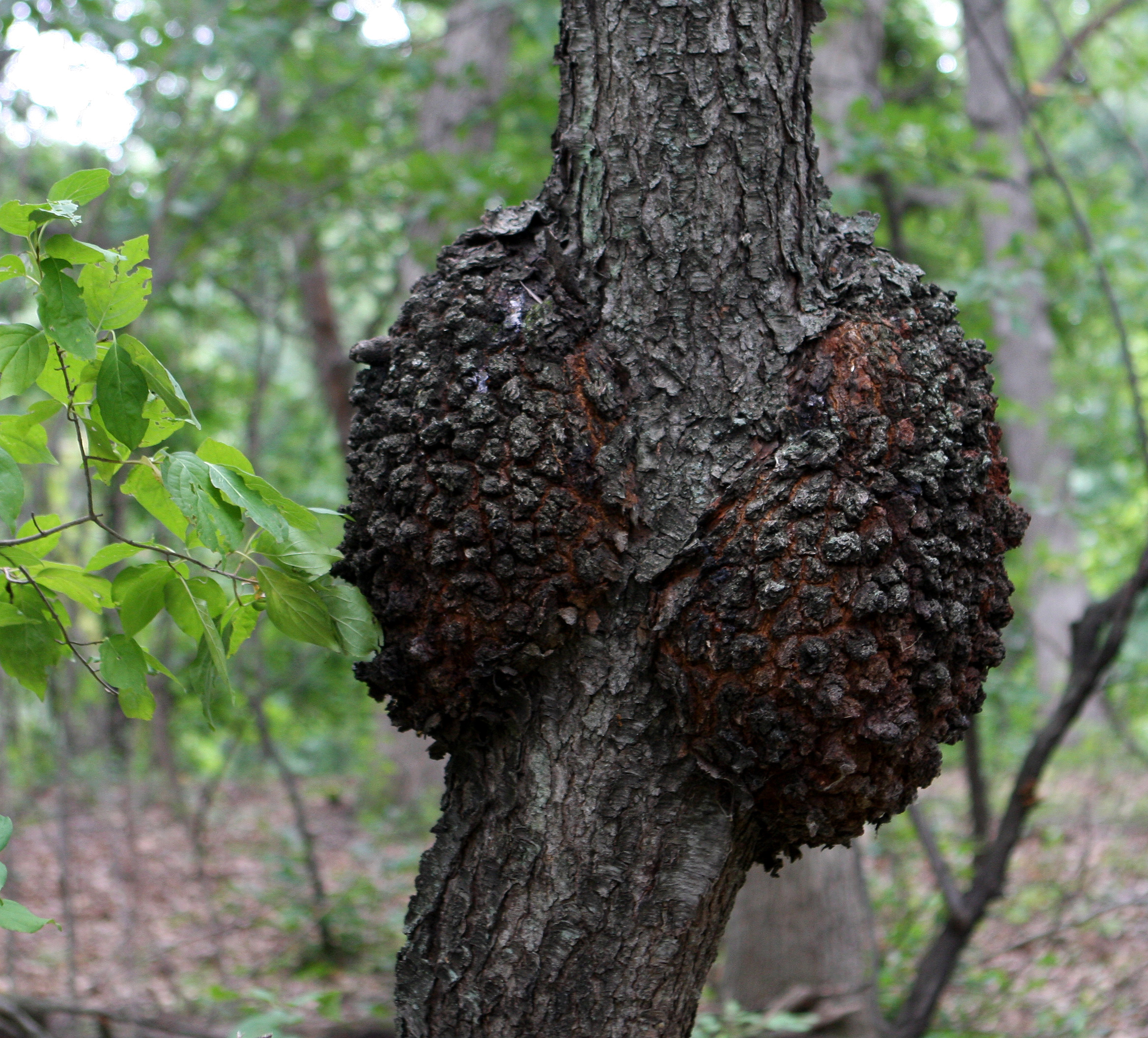
Black knot infection

Prunus serotina is a pioneer species. In the Midwest, it is seen growing mostly in old fields with other sunlight-loving species, such as black walnut, black locust, and hackberry. Gleason and Cronquist (1991) describe P. serotina as "[f]ormerly a forest tree, now abundant as a weed-tree of roadsides, waste land, and forest-margins". It is a moderately long-lived tree, with recorded ages reaching 258 years. It is prone to storm damage, with branches breaking easily; any decay resulting from it however, progresses slowly.

Some seeds may remain in the soil bank and not germinate for as long as three years. All Prunus species have hard seeds that benefit from scarification to germinate (which in nature is produced by passing through an animal's digestive tract). The tree is hardy and can tolerate poor soils and oceanic salt sprays.

The species hosts the caterpillars of more than 450 species of butterflies and moths, including those of the eastern tiger swallowtail, cherry gall azure, viceroy, and red-spotted purple/white admiral butterflies and the cecropia, promethea, polyphemus, small-eyed sphinx, wild cherry sphinx, banded tussock, spotted apatelodes, and band-edged prominent moths.

=== Pests and diseases ===
Hyphantria cunea can inhibit the impact of cyanide within the plants' leaves due to its alkaline stomach acid. The eastern tent caterpillar defoliates entire groves some springs.

=== Invasiveness ===
It has acted as an invasive species in Western and Central Europe, negatively affecting forest community biodiversity and regeneration.

== Uses ==
Known as capolcuahuitl in Nahuatl (the source of the capuli epithet), it was an important food in pre-Columbian Mexico. Edible raw, the fruit is also made into jelly, and the juice can be used as a drink mixer, hence the common name 'rum cherry'.

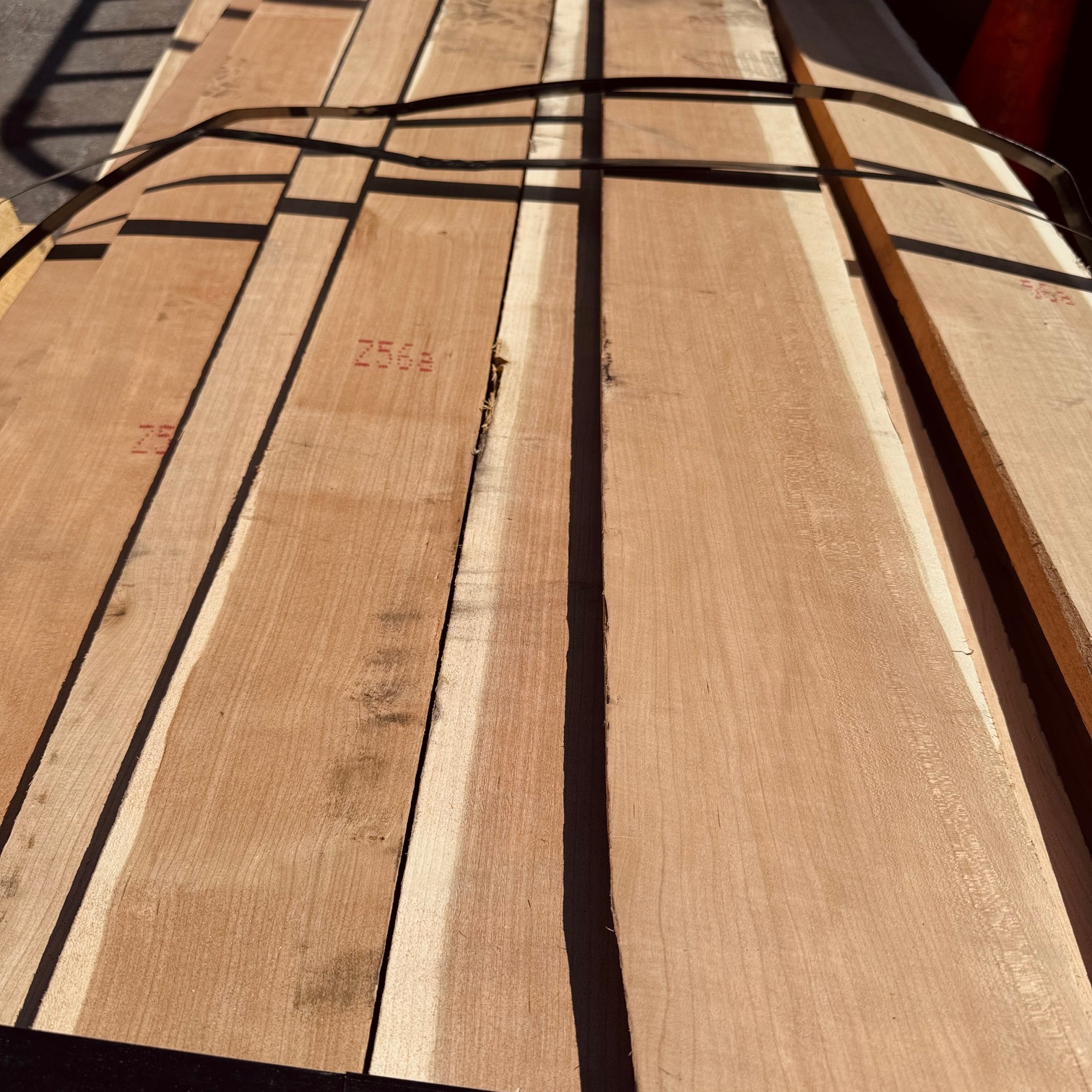
Quartersawn Cherry Lumber has vertical grainlines that match well with plywoods and veneers.

Prunus serotina timber is valuable, perhaps the premier cabinetry timber of the U.S., traded as "cherry". High quality cherry timber is known for its strong orange hues, tight grain and high price. Low-quality wood, as well as the sap wood, can be more tan. Its density when dried is around 560 kg/m^{3} (35 lb/cu ft).

Prunus serotina was widely introduced into Western and Central Europe as an ornamental tree in the mid-20th century.

== See also ==
- Alabama black cherry
