= Halysidota striata =

Scientific classification
- Domain: Eukaryota
- Kingdom: Animalia
- Phylum: Arthropoda
- Class: Insecta
- Order: Lepidoptera
- Superfamily: Noctuoidea
- Family: Erebidae
- Subfamily: Arctiinae
- Genus: Halysidota
- Species: H. striata

Binomial name
- Halysidota striata E. D. Jones, 1908

Species of moth

Halysidota striata is a moth of the family Erebidae. It was described by E. Dukinfield Jones in 1908. It is found in Brazil.
