= Pseudischnocampa =

Scientific classification
- Domain: Eukaryota
- Kingdom: Animalia
- Phylum: Arthropoda
- Class: Insecta
- Order: Lepidoptera
- Superfamily: Noctuoidea
- Family: Erebidae
- Subfamily: Arctiinae
- Subtribe: Phaegopterina
- Genus: Pseudischnocampa; Rothschild, 1935

Genus of moths

Pseudischnocampa is a genus of moths in the family Erebidae. The genus was described by Rothschild in 1935.

== Species ==
- Pseudischnocampa diluta Toulgoët, 1986
- Pseudischnocampa ecuadorensis Rothschild, 1933
- Pseudischnocampa humosa (Dognin, 1893)
- Pseudischnocampa nigridorsata Schaus, 1901
- Pseudischnocampa nigrivena Schaus, 1901
- Pseudischnocampa triphylia (Druce, 1896)
