= Β-Glucosidase =

Class of enzymes

β-Glucosidase
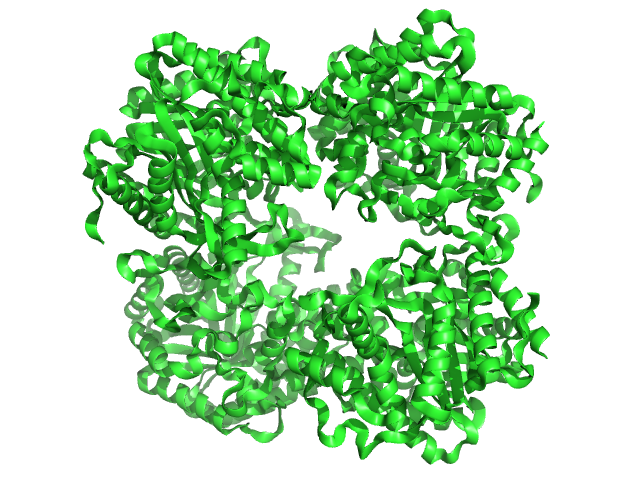
- The structure of β-glucosidase A from bacterium Clostridium cellulovorans.

Identifiers
- EC no.: 3.2.1.21
- CAS no.: 9001-22-3

Databases
- BRENDA: enzyme data
- ExPASy: NiceZyme view
- KEGG: enzyme entry
- MetaCyc: metabolic pathway
- Rhea: reactions
- PDB structures: RCSB PDB PDBe PDBsum
- Gene Ontology: AmiGO / QuickGO
Search
- PMC: articles
- PubMed: articles
- NCBI: proteins

β-Glucosidase (EC 3.2.1.21; systematic name β-D-glucoside glucohydrolase) is an enzyme that catalyses the following reaction:

Hydrolysis of terminal, non-reducing β-D-glucosyl residues with release of β-D-glucose

== Structure ==
β-Glucosidase is composed of two polypeptide chains. Each chain is made up of 438 amino acids and constitute a subunit of the enzyme. Each of these subunits contains an active site. The active site has three potential components: the pocket, the cleft, and the tunnel. The pocket structure is beneficial for recognition of monosaccharide like glucose. The cleft allows for binding of sugars to form polysaccharides. The tunnel allows for the enzyme to attach to polysaccharide and then release product while still attached to the sugar.

== Function ==
The function of the enzyme is to perform hydrolysis of various glycosides and oligosaccharides. The most significant oligosaccharide β-glucosidase reacts with is cellulose. Cellulose is a polymer composed of β-1,4-linked glucosyl residues. β-glucosidases, cellulases (endoglucanases), cellobiosidases (exoglucanases) are required by a number of organisms to consume it. These enzymes are powerful tools for degradation of plant cell walls by pathogens and other organisms consuming plant biomass. β‑glucosidases are essential for many organisms to digest a variety of nutrients. This enzyme completes double-displacement reaction, meaning that the enzyme is changed to an intermediate form when the first substrate enters the active site, it then releases the product before another substrate binds, and reverts to its original form by the end of the reaction. In the case of β-glucosidase, two carboxylate residues of glucosides, cellobiose, cellotriose, cellotetraose are involved at the active site. The purpose of the reaction is to remove the residues from disaccharide cellobiose to produce glucose during the hydrolysis of biomass. Depending on what the enzyme is reacting with the end product will be one or two glucose molecules.

=== Humans ===
In humans, tissues within the liver, small intestine, spleen and kidney contain a cytosolic β-glucosidase (CBG) that hydrolyses various β-d-glycosides. This human enzyme shows significant activity towards many xenobiotics commonly found in the human diet including glycosides of phytoestrogens, flavonoids, simple phenolics and cyanogens and human CBG hydrolyses a broad range of dietary glucosides, possibly playing a critical role in xenobiotic metabolism.

Liposomal β-glucosidase (glucocerebrosidas), found in human lysosomes, plays an important role in the degradation of glycosphingolipids, breaking down glucosylceramide into ceramide and glucose. Gaucher's disease is characterised by an accumulation of glucosylceramide in bodily tissues due to a lack of, or impaired activity of liposomal β-glucosidase, leading to weakened bones, liver damage, and enlargement of the spleen and impairment to its normal function.

Beyond β-glucosidases expressed in human tissues, bacterial β-glucosidases are also found in human saliva and inside the intestine produced by the bacterial microbiota of the mouth and gastro-intestinal tract, with various implications to normal human health, drug and hormone metabolism, and involvement in certain diseases.

=== Bonnethead shark ===
Bonnethead sharks are found in tropical and subtropical water living in estuaries with muddy or sandy bottoms, rich with seagrass. They were once thought of as being solely carnivores. It was known that bonnethead did consume seagrass, but it was viewed as incidental and dismissed as not helping the benefitting the shark. However, recent studies of the shark's hindgut has found that it has a high activity level of β-glucosidase. During the digestive process of the bonnethead shark, the acidic stomach weakens the cell walls of the seagrass and allows for β-glucosidase to enter the cell and digest the cellulose. The activity level is on par with the monkeyface eel. The monkeyface eel is a herbivore, meaning that the bonnethead is able to perform the same digestive activity as a herbivore. Therefore, the bonnethead shark is now classified as an omnivore.

=== Christmas island red crab ===
The Christmas Island red crab is a species of crab located solely in the Christmas Island of the Indian Ocean. Land crabs such as these possess multiple varieties of β-glucosidase as they are terrestrial herbivores. In the case of the Christmas Island red crab β-glucosidase not only produces glucose, but also removes cellobiose. This is important as cellobiose is an inhibitor for a number of enzymes including endo-β-1,4-glucanase and cellobiohydrolase. β-Glucosidase is also capable of hydrolysis on small oligomers that are produced by other enzymes without the assistance of an intermediate enzyme. This in turn makes β-glucosidase a very efficient enzyme in not only the digestive tract of the Christmas Island red crab, but other crustaceans as well.

== Synonyms ==
Synonyms, derivatives, and related enzymes include gentiobiase, cellobiase, emulsin, elaterase, aryl-β-glucosidase, β-D-glucosidase, β-glucoside glucohydrolase, arbutinase, amygdalinase, p-nitrophenyl β-glucosidase, primeverosidase, amygdalase, linamarase, salicilinase, and β-1,6-glucosidase.

glucosidase, beta, acid 3 (cytosolic)

Identifiers
- Symbol: GBA3
- Alt. symbols: CBGL1, KLRP
- NCBI gene: 57733
- HGNC: 19069
- OMIM: 606619
- RefSeq: NM_020973
- UniProt: Q9H227

Other data
- EC number: 3.2.1.21
- Locus: Chr. 4 p15.31
Search for
- Structures: Swiss-model
- Domains: InterPro

== See also ==
- Amygdalin β-glucosidase
- Cellulase, a suite of enzymes produced chiefly by fungi, bacteria, and protozoans that catalyze cellulolysis (i.e. the hydrolysis of cellulose)
- Glucosylceramidase, a related enzyme
- Prunasin β-glucosidase
- Vicianin β-glucosidase
