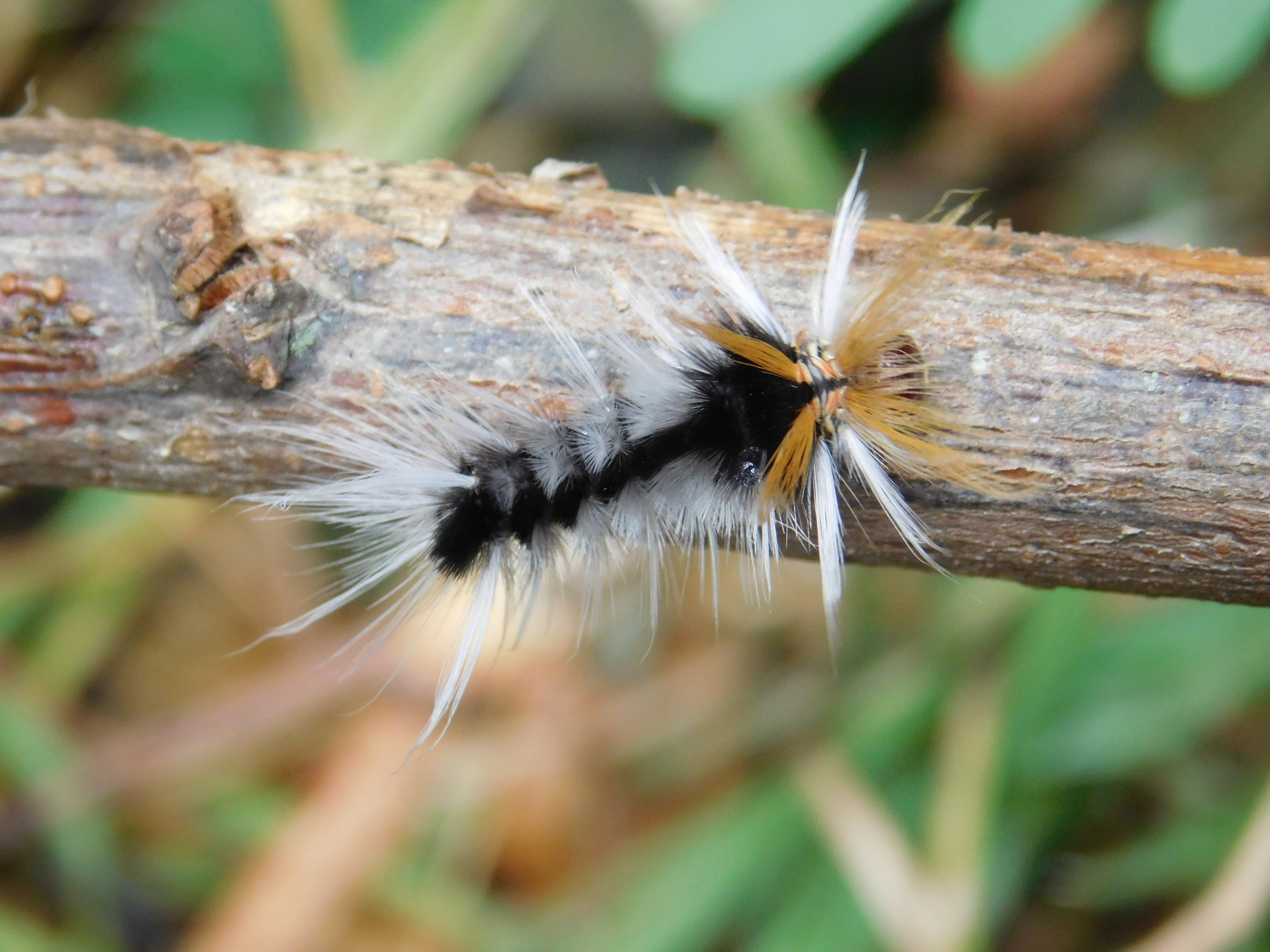

Scientific classification
- Kingdom: Animalia
- Phylum: Arthropoda
- Class: Insecta
- Order: Lepidoptera
- Superfamily: Noctuoidea
- Family: Erebidae
- Subfamily: Arctiinae
- Genus: Halysidota
- Species: H. ruscheweyhi

Binomial name
- Halysidota ruscheweyhi Dyar, 1912

= Halysidota ruscheweyhi =

Species of moth

Halysidota ruscheweyhi is a moth of the family Erebidae. It was described by Harrison Gray Dyar Jr. in 1912. It is found in Argentina, Uruguay and Paraguay.
