= Halysidota leda =

Scientific classification
- Domain: Eukaryota
- Kingdom: Animalia
- Phylum: Arthropoda
- Class: Insecta
- Order: Lepidoptera
- Superfamily: Noctuoidea
- Family: Erebidae
- Subfamily: Arctiinae
- Genus: Halysidota
- Species: H. leda

Binomial name
- Halysidota leda (H. Druce, 1890)

Synonyms
- Phoegoptera leda H. Druce, 1890; Euphalisidota leda

Species of moth

Halysidota leda is a moth of the family Erebidae. It was described by Herbert Druce in 1890. It is found on Dominica, Guadeloupe and Martinique. The habitat consists of hygrophilic (moist) and mesophilic (moderate temperature) areas.

The larvae are polyphagous and have been recorded feeding on Cecropia and Miconia species.

== Subspecies ==
- Halysidota leda leda (Dominica, Guadeloupe)
- Halysidota leda enricoi Toulgoët, 1978 (Windward Islands, Martinique)
