= Halysidota rhoda =

Scientific classification
- Kingdom: Animalia
- Phylum: Arthropoda
- Class: Insecta
- Order: Lepidoptera
- Superfamily: Noctuoidea
- Family: Erebidae
- Subfamily: Arctiinae
- Genus: Halysidota
- Species: H. rhoda

Binomial name
- Halysidota rhoda (Hampson, 1901)

Synonyms
- Halisidota rhoda Hampson, 1901

Species of moth

Halysidota rhoda is a moth of the family Erebidae. It was described by George Hampson in 1901. It is found in Bolivia.
