= Halysidota atra =

Scientific classification
- Domain: Eukaryota
- Kingdom: Animalia
- Phylum: Arthropoda
- Class: Insecta
- Order: Lepidoptera
- Superfamily: Noctuoidea
- Family: Erebidae
- Subfamily: Arctiinae
- Genus: Halysidota
- Species: H. atra

Binomial name
- Halysidota atra H. Druce, 1884

Species of moth

Halysidota atra is a moth of the family Erebidae. It was described by Herbert Druce in 1884. It is found in Guatemala, Mexico, Honduras, Costa Rica, Nicaragua, Panama, Peru, Colombia, Ecuador and Bolivia.

== Subspecies ==
- Halysidota atra atra (Guatemala, Mexico, Honduras, Costa Rica, Nicaragua, Panama, Colombia)
- Halysidota atra rindgei Watson, 1980 (Peru, Colombia, Ecuador, Bolivia)
