= Halysidota intensa =

Scientific classification
- Domain: Eukaryota
- Kingdom: Animalia
- Phylum: Arthropoda
- Class: Insecta
- Order: Lepidoptera
- Superfamily: Noctuoidea
- Family: Erebidae
- Subfamily: Arctiinae
- Genus: Halysidota
- Species: H. intensa

Binomial name
- Halysidota intensa Rothschild, 1909

Synonyms
- Halisidota interlineata intensa Rothschild, 1909; Halisidota interlineata ab. subterminalis Strand, 1919

Species of moth

Halysidota intensa is a moth of the family Erebidae. It was described by Walter Rothschild in 1909. It is found in Guatemala, Costa Rica, Honduras, Colombia, Venezuela, Ecuador, Peru and Bolivia.
