= Halysidota fuliginosa =

Scientific classification
- Domain: Eukaryota
- Kingdom: Animalia
- Phylum: Arthropoda
- Class: Insecta
- Order: Lepidoptera
- Superfamily: Noctuoidea
- Family: Erebidae
- Subfamily: Arctiinae
- Genus: Halysidota
- Species: H. fuliginosa

Binomial name
- Halysidota fuliginosa Rothschild, 1909

Synonyms
- Halisidota carinator Dyar, 1912; Halisidota cinctipes ab. meta Strand, 1919

Species of moth

Halysidota fuliginosa is a moth of the family Erebidae. It was described by Walter Rothschild in 1909. It is found in Mexico, Guatemala, Honduras, Costa Rica, El Salvador and possibly Peru and Venezuela.
