= Halysidota insularis =

Scientific classification
- Domain: Eukaryota
- Kingdom: Animalia
- Phylum: Arthropoda
- Class: Insecta
- Order: Lepidoptera
- Superfamily: Noctuoidea
- Family: Erebidae
- Subfamily: Arctiinae
- Genus: Halysidota
- Species: H. insularis

Binomial name
- Halysidota insularis Rothschild, 1909

Synonyms
- Halisidota schausi insularis Rothschild, 1909

Species of moth

Halysidota insularis is a moth of the family Erebidae. It was described by Walter Rothschild in 1909. It is found on Saint Lucia.
