= Halysidota grata =

Scientific classification
- Kingdom: Animalia
- Phylum: Arthropoda
- Clade: Pancrustacea
- Class: Insecta
- Order: Lepidoptera
- Superfamily: Noctuoidea
- Family: Erebidae
- Subfamily: Arctiinae
- Genus: Halysidota
- Species: H. grata

Binomial name
- Halysidota grata Walker, 1866

Species of moth

Halysidota grata is a moth of the family Erebidae. It was described by Francis Walker in 1866. It is found in Colombia.
