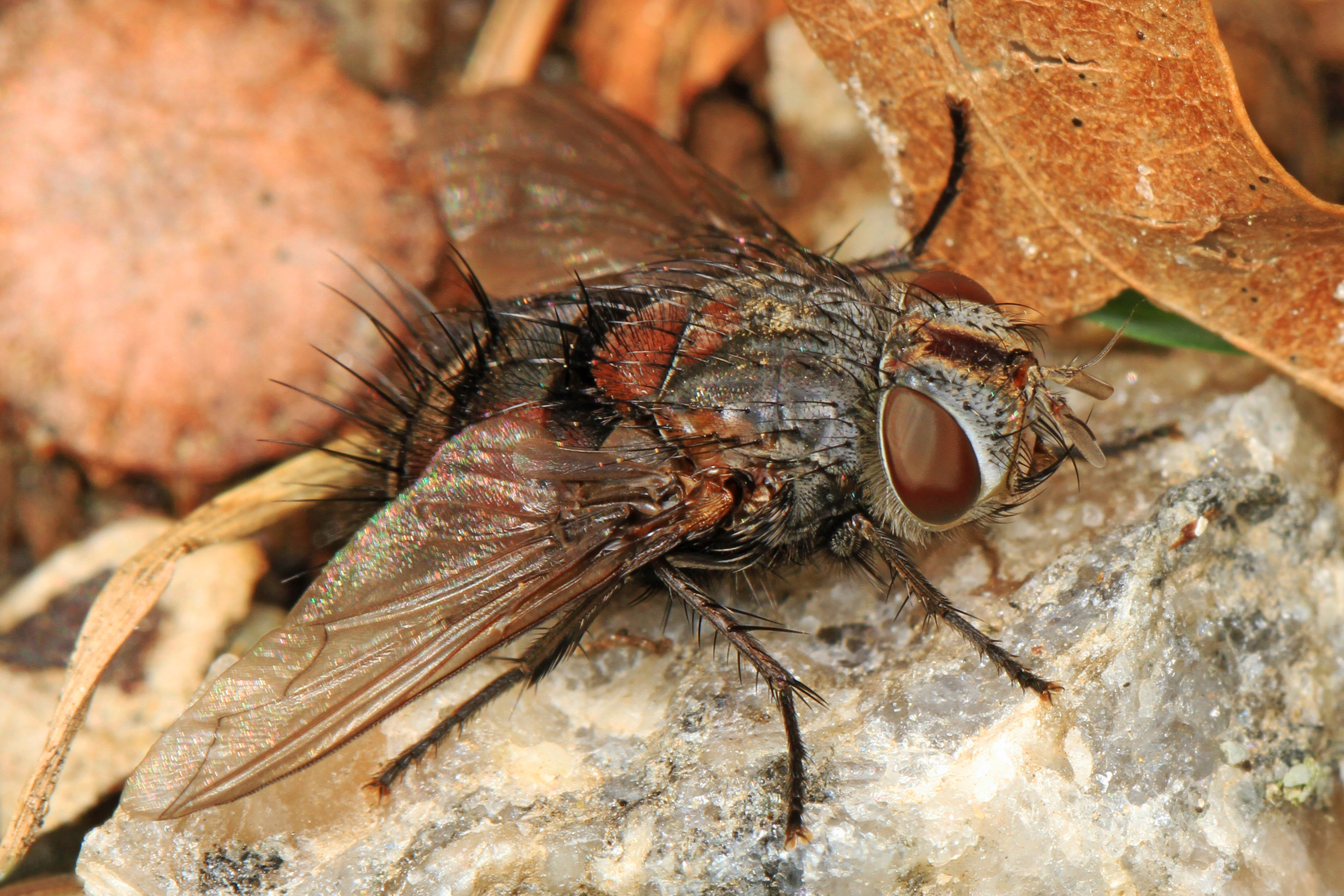
- Leschenaultia fly

Scientific classification
- Kingdom: Animalia
- Phylum: Arthropoda
- Class: Insecta
- Order: Diptera
- Family: Tachinidae
- Subfamily: Exoristinae
- Tribe: Goniini
- Genus: Leschenaultia; Robineau-Desvoidy, 1830

Type species
- Leschenaultia cilipes Robineau-Desvoidy, 1830

Synonyms
- Blepharipeza Macquart, 1844; Blepharopeza Agassiz, 1846; Echinomasicera Townsend, 1915; Harrisiopsis Townsend, 1927; Parachaeta Coquillett, 1897; Parachaetopsis Blanchard, 1959; Rileya Brauer & von Berganstamm, 1893; Rileymyia Townsend, 1893

= Leschenaultia =

Genus of flies

Leschenaultia is a genus of flies in the family Tachinidae.

== Species ==
- Leschenaultia adusta (Loew, 1872) – United States (California, Arizona, New Mexico), Mexico (Sonora, Durango)
- Leschenaultia aldrichi Toma & Guimarães, 2002 – Brazil (São Paulo, Santa Catarina)
- Leschenaultia americana (Brauer & von Berganstamm, 1893) – Canada (British Columbia, Alberta), United States (Oregon, Montana, Idaho, California, Arizona)
- Leschenaultia arnaudi Toma & Guimarães, 2002 – Haiti
- Leschenaultia barbarae Toma, 2008 – Venezuela
- Leschenaultia bergenstammi Toma & Guimarães, 2002 – Brazil (Santa Catarina), Peru (San Martín)
- Leschenaultia bessi Toma & Guimarães, 2002 – Brazil (São Paulo, Santa Catarina)
- Leschenaultia bicolor (Macquart, 1846)
- Leschenaultia bigoti Toma & Guimarães, 2002 – Canada, United States, Mexico, Brazil, Argentina
- Leschenaultia blanchardi Toma & Guimarães, 2002 – Mexico, Honduras, Costa Rica, Ecuador, Peru, Brazil
- Leschenaultia braueri Toma & Guimarães, 2002 – Ecuador
- Leschenaultia brooksi Toma & Guimarães, 2002 – Mexico, Panama, Peru, Brazil
- Leschenaultia ciliata (Macquart, 1848) – Colombia (Bogotá)
- Leschenaultia coquilletti Toma & Guimarães, 2002 – Brazil (Santa Catarina)
- Leschenaultia cortesi Toma & Guimarães, 2002 – Venezuela, Colombia
- Leschenaultia currani Toma & Guimarães, 2002 – Brazil (São Paulo, Santa Catarina)
- Leschenaultia exul (Townsend, 1892) – Canada (Ontario, Quebec, New Brunswick), United States (Maine, New York, New Hampshire, Massachusetts, Connecticut, New Jersey, Maryland)
- Leschenaultia fulvipes (Bigot, 1887) – Canada (British Columbia, Saskatchewan), United States (Washington, Idaho, Wyoming, California, Arizona, New Mexico, Texas)
- Leschenaultia grossa Brooks, 1947 – United States (Nevada, Arizona, New Mexico)
- Leschenaultia halisidotae Brooks, 1947 – Canada (British Columbia, Ontario, Quebec), United States (Minnesota, Maine, New York, Massachusetts, Ohio, Wisconsin, Pennsylvania, New Jersey, California, Arizona)
- Leschenaultia hospita Reinhard, 1952 – Mexico (Michoacán, Oaxaca, Morelos), United States (New Mexico)
- Leschenaultia hystrix (Townsend, 1915) – Peru (Matucana)
- Leschenaultia jurinioides (Townsend, 1895) – Jamaica
- Leschenaultia leucophrys (Wiedemann, 1830) – Mexico, Venezuela, Ecuador, Bolivia, Peru, Paraguay, Uruguay, Brazil
- Leschenaultia loewi Toma & Guimarães, 2002 – Mexico (Veracruz)
- Leschenaultia macquarti Toma & Guimarães, 2002 – United States (Arizona)
- Leschenaultia montagna (Townsend, 1912) – Peru
- Leschenaultia nigricalyptrata (Macquart, 1855)
- Leschenaultia nuda Thompson, 1963 – Trinidad
- Leschenaultia proseni (Blanchard, 1959)
- Leschenaultia reinhardi Toma & Guimarães, 2002 – Canada (British Columbia, Ontario, Quebec), United States (Oregon, Idaho, Ohio, California, Tennessee
- Leschenaultia sabroskyi Toma & Guimarães, 2002 – United States (California, Arizona)
- Leschenaultia schineri Toma & Guimarães, 2002 – United States (Oregon, California, Idaho)
- Leschenaultia thompsoni Toma & Guimarães, 2002 – Mexico (Mexico City, Chiapas)
- Leschenaultia townsendi Toma & Guimarães, 2002 – Mexico (Puebla)

One species, Leschenaultia nigrisquamis (Townsend, 1892), was not examined in the most recent monograph of the genus, because the type material is missing, and two former species were not recognised:

- Leschenaultia trichopsis (Bigot, 1887)
- Leschenaultia hirta Robineau-Desvoidy, 1830
