= Halysidota baritioides =

Scientific classification
- Domain: Eukaryota
- Kingdom: Animalia
- Phylum: Arthropoda
- Class: Insecta
- Order: Lepidoptera
- Superfamily: Noctuoidea
- Family: Erebidae
- Subfamily: Arctiinae
- Genus: Halysidota
- Species: H. baritioides

Binomial name
- Halysidota baritioides (Rothschild, 1909)

Synonyms
- Halisidota baritioides Rothschild, 1909

Species of moth

Halysidota baritioides is a moth of the family Erebidae. Described by Walter Rothschild in 1909, it is found in Brazil.
