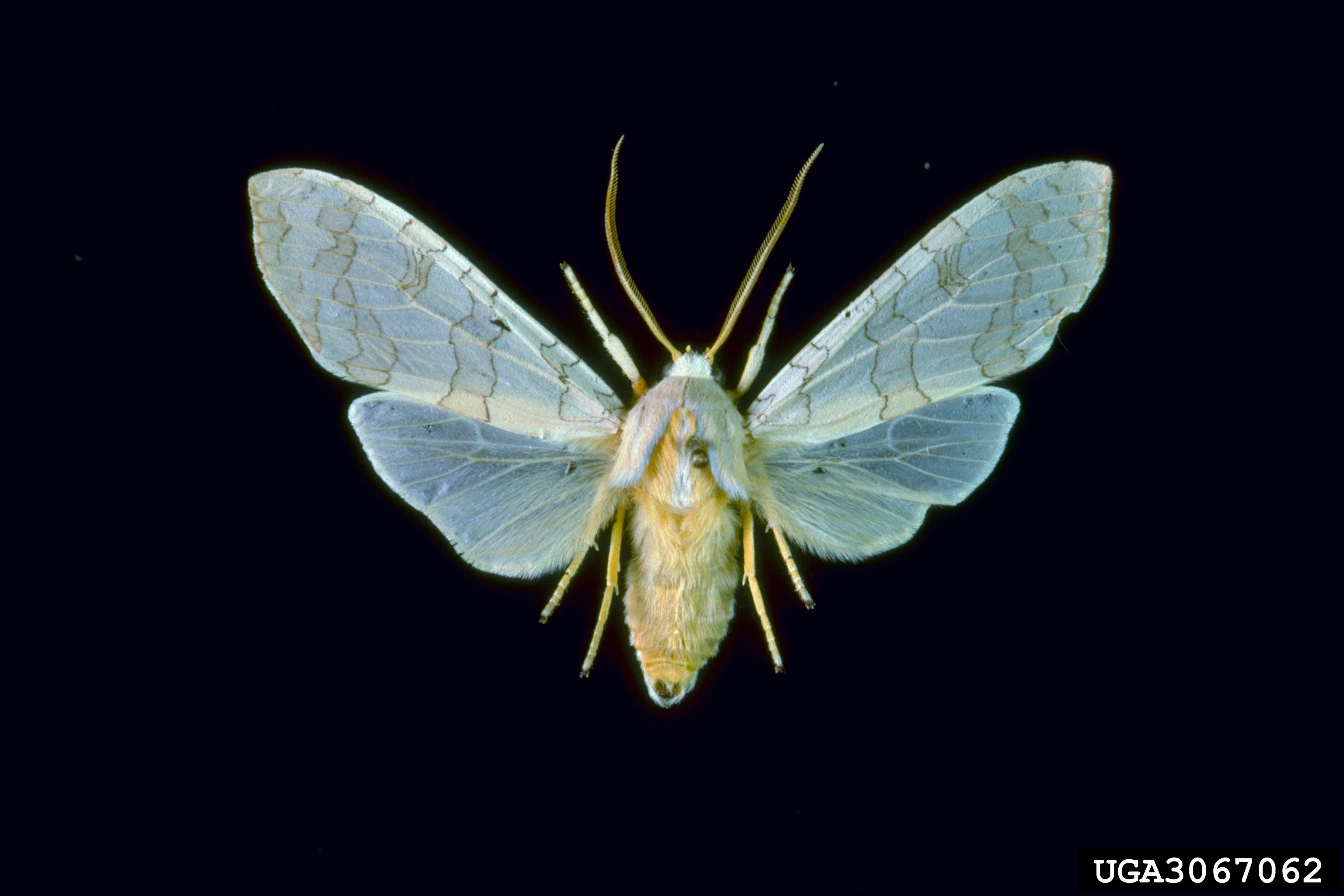

Scientific classification
- Kingdom: Animalia
- Phylum: Arthropoda
- Class: Insecta
- Order: Lepidoptera
- Superfamily: Noctuoidea
- Family: Erebidae
- Subfamily: Arctiinae
- Genus: Halysidota
- Species: H. harrisii

Binomial name
- Halysidota harrisii Walsh, 1864

= Halysidota harrisii =

Species of moth

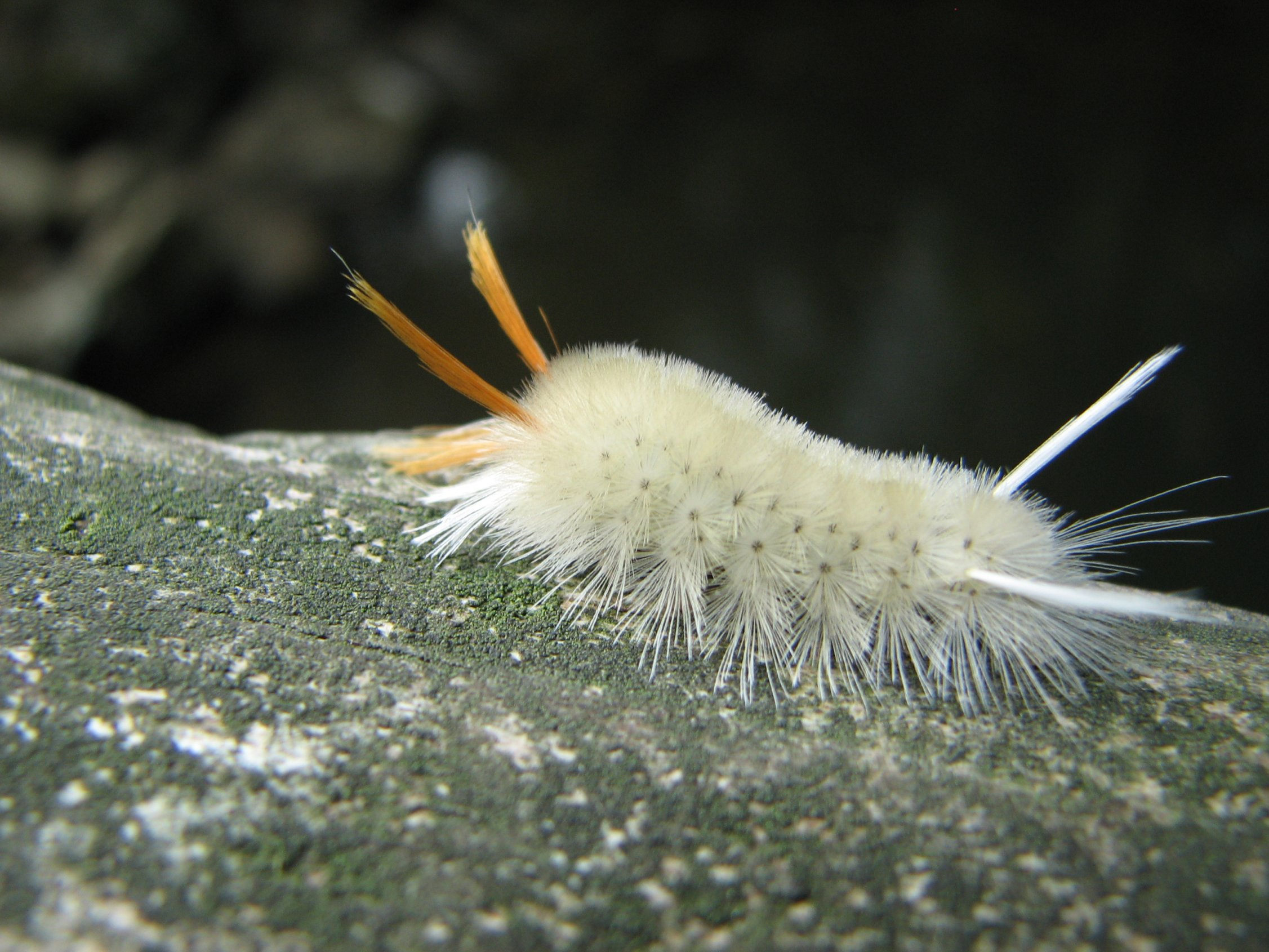
Caterpillar

Halysidota harrisii, the sycamore tiger moth, is a moth belonging to the family Erebidae and the tribe Arctiini, the tiger moths. The species was first described by Benjamin Dann Walsh in 1864. It is found in southeastern Canada, the eastern parts of the United States, and northeastern Mexico.

== Description ==
The larvae have yellow-orange heads and bodies covered with hair, and they can grow to approximately 25–35 mm in length. They exhibit two pairs of long, orange hair-pencils and two pairs of white hair-pencils towards the front of their body. They also exhibit one pair of white hair-pencils near the back of their body.

The adults are pale yellow with dark bands on the forewings. Each forewing is 24–26 mm in length, making the wingspan approximately 50 mm. As adults, they are almost indistinguishable from the closely related Halysidota tesselaris.

== Life cycle ==
The sycamore tiger moth produces two generations each year. Moths emerge from overwintering cocoons from May to June. After mating, they lay egg masses on bark and the underside of leaves. The larvae feed on the American sycamore tree, Platanus occidentalis. They pupate in late June and July, and emerge as moths in July and August. The offspring of this generation spins cocoons in late September and October and overwinters as pupae.

== Importance ==
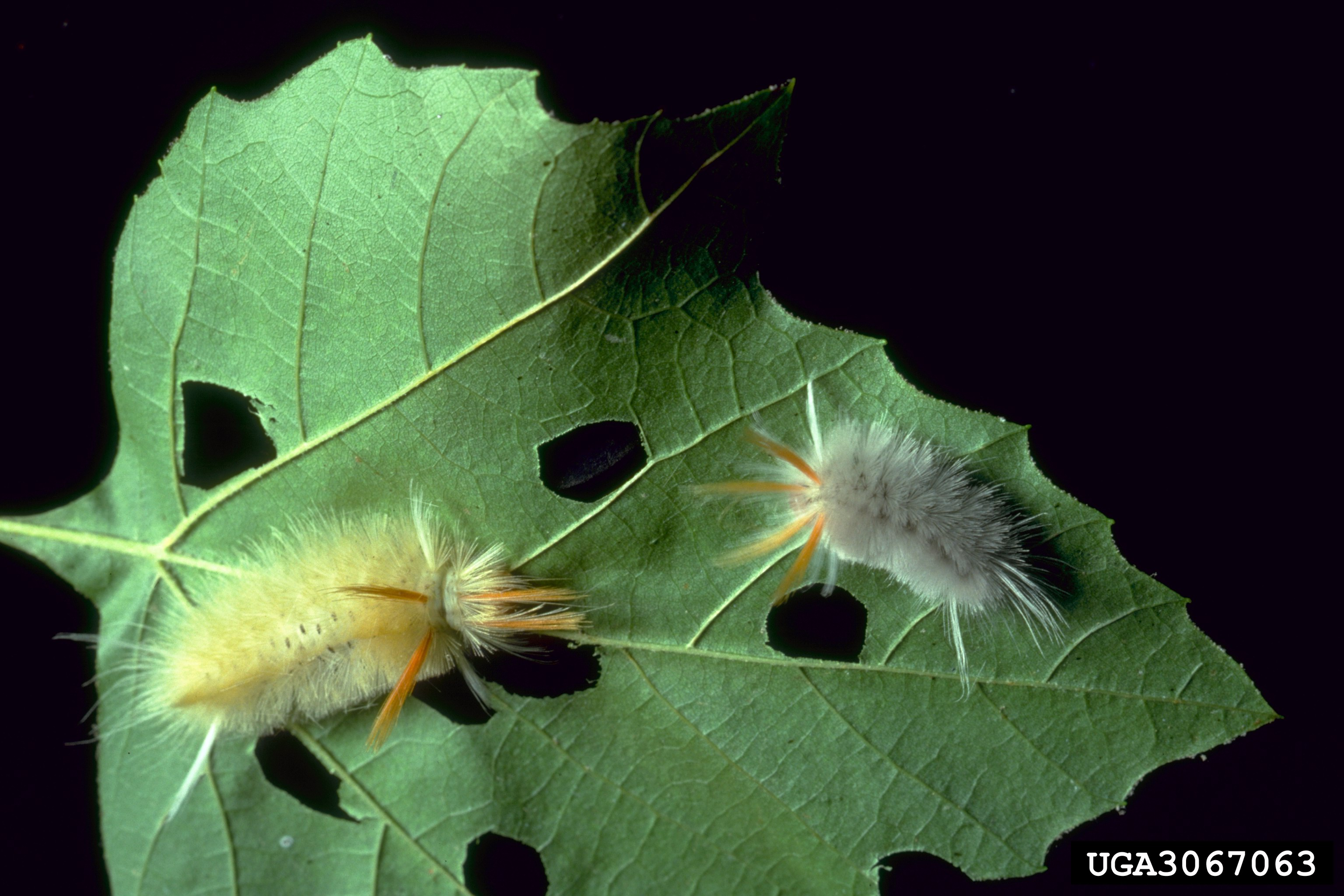
Caterpillars and leaf damage

An overpopulation of the insect can be damaging to sycamore trees. Natural predators, such as birds, control most populations. However, pesticides may be needed.

The sycamore tussock moth caterpillar has been documented causing urticaria (hives).
