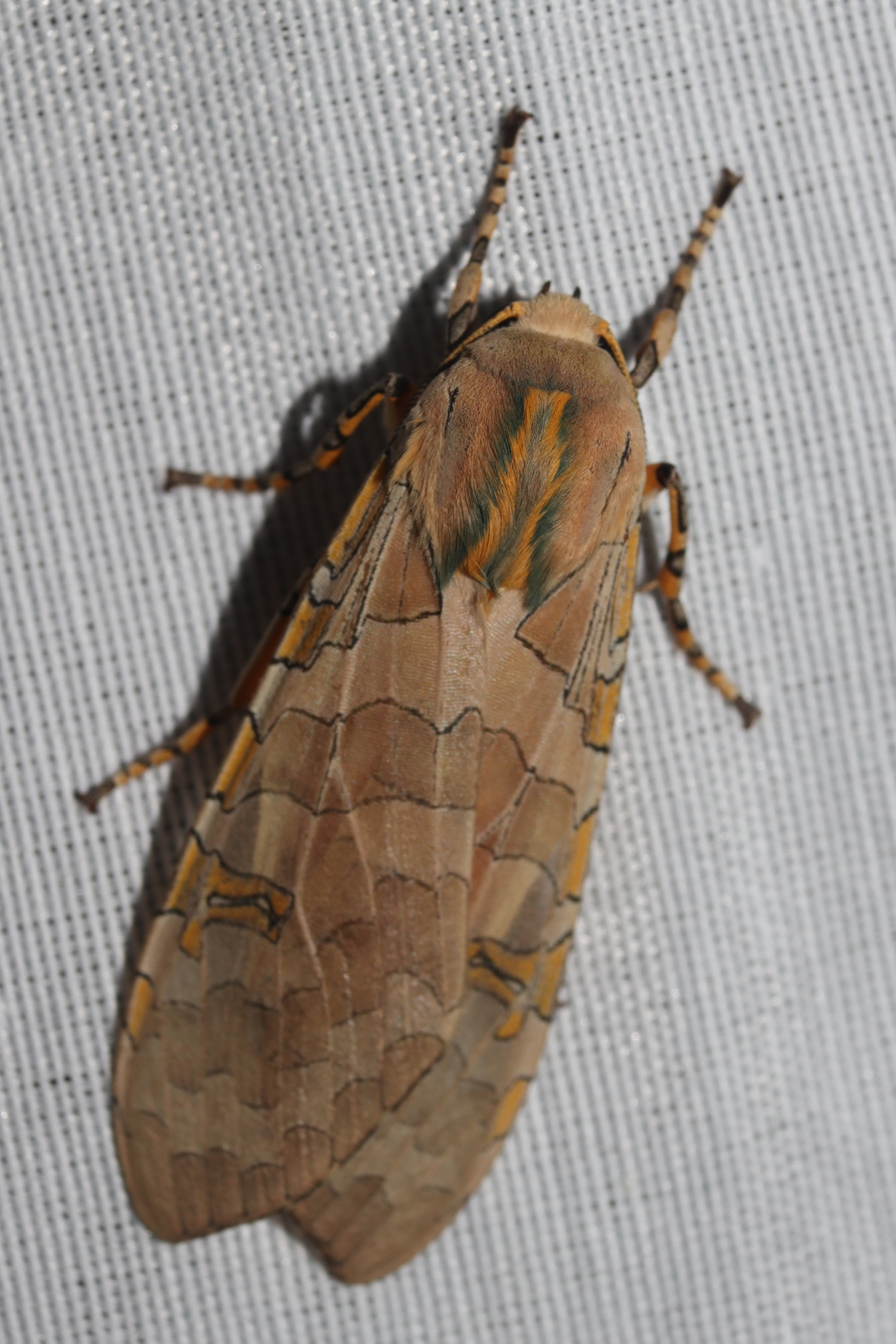

Scientific classification
- Kingdom: Animalia
- Phylum: Arthropoda
- Class: Insecta
- Order: Lepidoptera
- Superfamily: Noctuoidea
- Family: Erebidae
- Subfamily: Arctiinae
- Genus: Halysidota
- Species: H. schausi

Binomial name
- Halysidota schausi Rothschild, 1909

Synonyms
- Halysidota mexiconis Strand, 1919; Halysidota schausi var. mexiconis Strand, 1919

= Halysidota schausi =

Species of moth

Halysidota schausi, or Schaus' tussock moth, is a species of moth in the family Erebidae. It was described by Walter Rothschild in 1909. It is found from Texas and Mexico to Costa Rica, Guatemala, Colombia, Venezuela, Ecuador and Peru. It is also found on Martinique and the Lesser Antilles.

Adults are mainly on wing in autumn.

The larvae feed on Cestrum nocturnum.
