= Halysidota brasiliensis =

Scientific classification
- Domain: Eukaryota
- Kingdom: Animalia
- Phylum: Arthropoda
- Class: Insecta
- Order: Lepidoptera
- Superfamily: Noctuoidea
- Family: Erebidae
- Subfamily: Arctiinae
- Genus: Halysidota
- Species: H. brasiliensis

Binomial name
- Halysidota brasiliensis Rothschild, 1909

Species of moth

Halysidota brasiliensis is a moth of the family Erebidae. It was described by Walter Rothschild in 1909. It is found in Paraguay and the south-eastern Brazilian states of Bahia, São Paulo, Paraná, Rio de Janeiro and Rio Grande do Sul.

The larvae feed on Phrygilanthus acutifolius and Trema micrantha.
