= Halysidota meridionalis =

Scientific classification
- Kingdom: Animalia
- Phylum: Arthropoda
- Clade: Pancrustacea
- Class: Insecta
- Order: Lepidoptera
- Superfamily: Noctuoidea
- Family: Erebidae
- Subfamily: Arctiinae
- Genus: Halysidota
- Species: H. meridionalis

Binomial name
- Halysidota meridionalis Rothschild, 1909

Species of moth

Halysidota meridionalis is a moth of the family Erebidae, described by Walter Rothschild in 1909 from Mexico.
