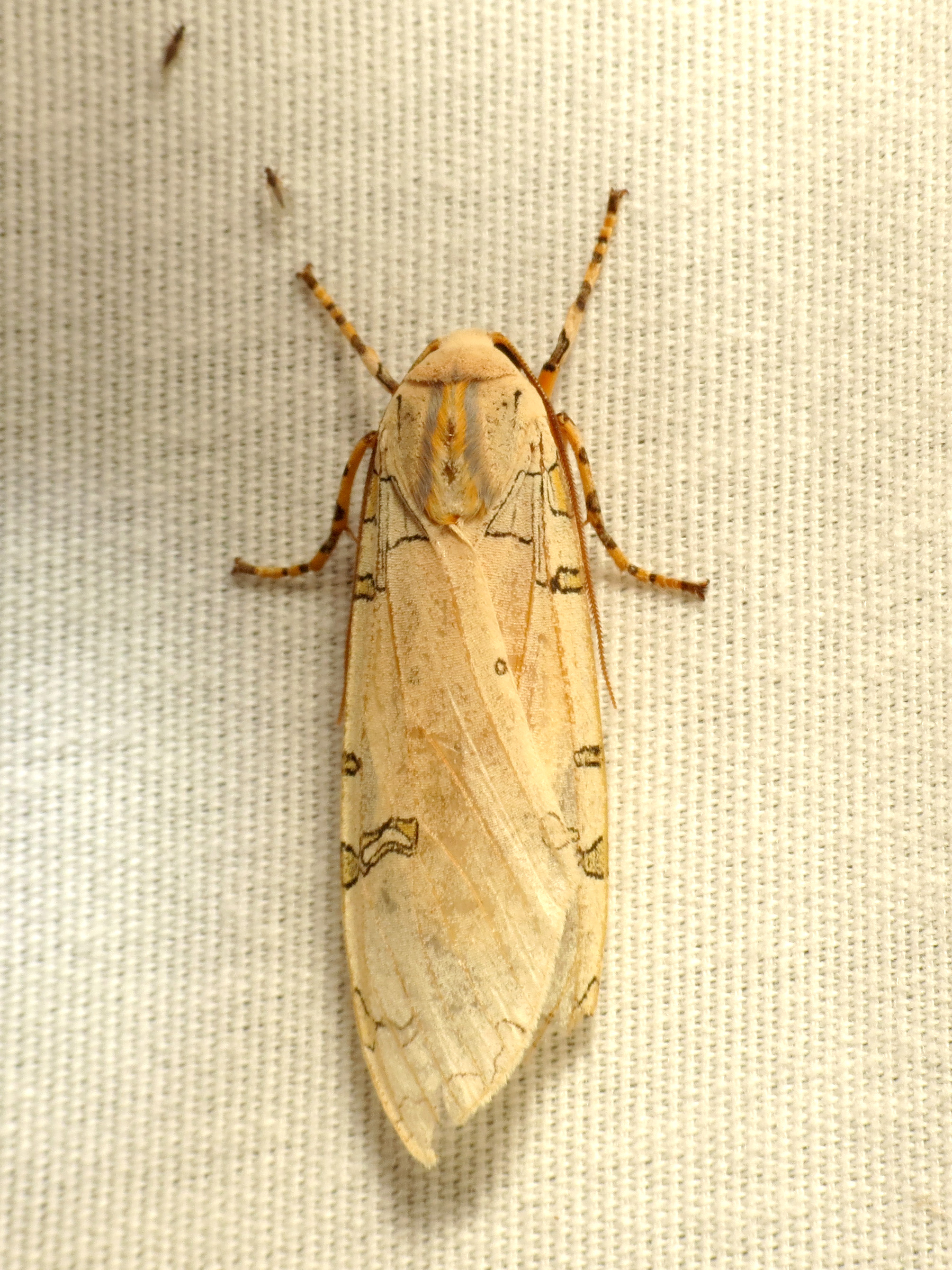
- Halysidota davisii. Portal Peak Lodge, Chiricahua Mountains, Cochise County, Arizona, USA.

Scientific classification
- Kingdom: Animalia
- Phylum: Arthropoda
- Clade: Pancrustacea
- Class: Insecta
- Order: Lepidoptera
- Superfamily: Noctuoidea
- Family: Erebidae
- Subfamily: Arctiinae
- Genus: Halysidota
- Species: H. davisii

Binomial name
- Halysidota davisii H. Edwards, 1874

= Halysidota davisii =

Davis' tussock moth

Species of moth

Halysidota davisii, or Davis' tussock moth, is a species of moth in the family Erebidae. It was described by Henry Edwards in 1874. It is found in Utah, Arizona, New Mexico and north-western Texas.

Adults are on wing from July to August.

The larvae have been recorded feeding on Quercus emoryi and Celtis species.

== Etymology ==
The species is named in honor of Dr. Davis.
