= Halysidota masoni =

Scientific classification
- Domain: Eukaryota
- Kingdom: Animalia
- Phylum: Arthropoda
- Class: Insecta
- Order: Lepidoptera
- Superfamily: Noctuoidea
- Family: Erebidae
- Subfamily: Arctiinae
- Genus: Halysidota
- Species: H. masoni

Binomial name
- Halysidota masoni (Schaus, 1895)

Synonyms
- Phaegoptera masoni Schaus, 1895

Species of moth

Halysidota masoni is a moth of the family Erebidae. It was described by William Schaus in 1895. It is found in Mexico.
