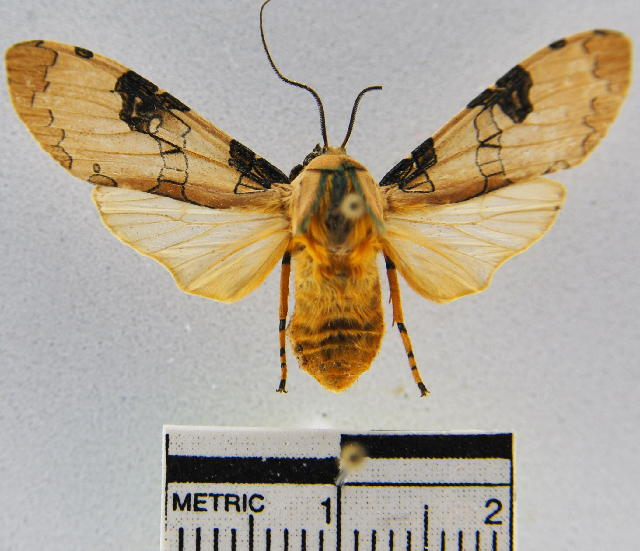
- Dorsal view
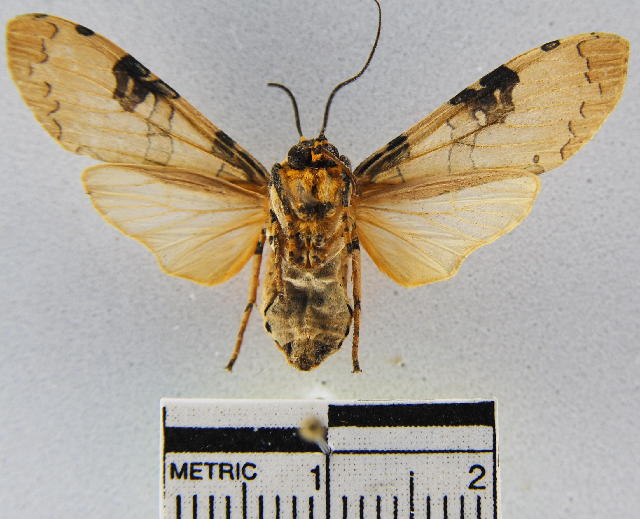
- Ventral view

Scientific classification
- Kingdom: Animalia
- Phylum: Arthropoda
- Class: Insecta
- Order: Lepidoptera
- Superfamily: Noctuoidea
- Family: Erebidae
- Subfamily: Arctiinae
- Genus: Halysidota
- Species: H. interlineata

Binomial name
- Halysidota interlineata Walker, 1855

Synonyms
- Phegoptera jucunda Herrich-Schäffer, [1855]

= Halysidota interlineata =

Species of moth

Halysidota interlineata is a moth of the family Erebidae first described by Francis Walker in 1855. It is found in Costa Rica, Guatemala, Panama, Belize, Colombia, Venezuela, Suriname, French Guiana, Brazil (Para, Rio de Janeiro, São Paulo, Santa Catarina) and Uruguay.

The larvae feed on Morus species.
