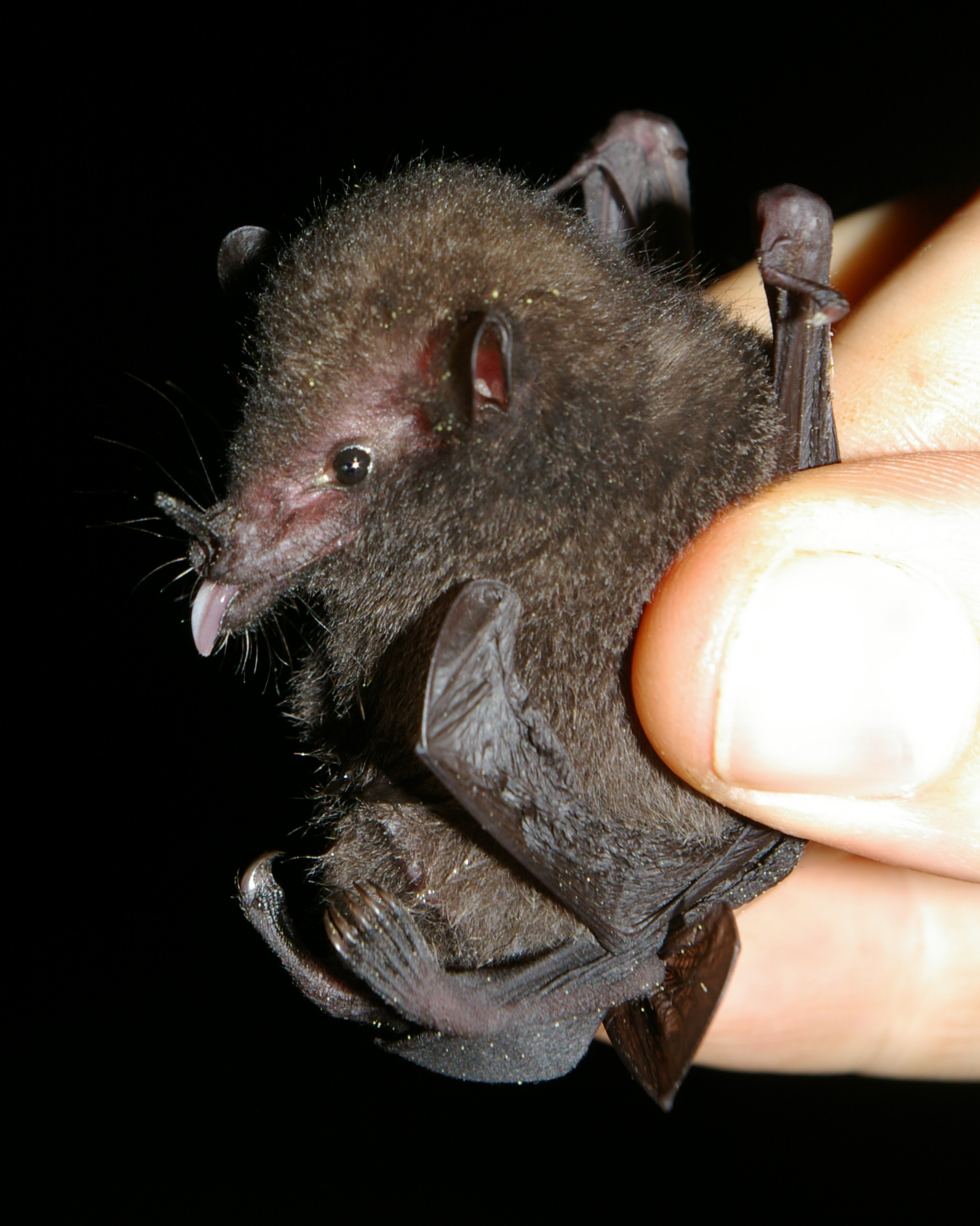

Conservation status
- Least Concern (IUCN 3.1)

Scientific classification
- Kingdom: Animalia
- Phylum: Chordata
- Class: Mammalia
- Order: Chiroptera
- Family: Phyllostomidae
- Genus: Hylonycteris; Thomas, 1903
- Species: H. underwoodi

Binomial name
- Hylonycteris underwoodi Thomas, 1903
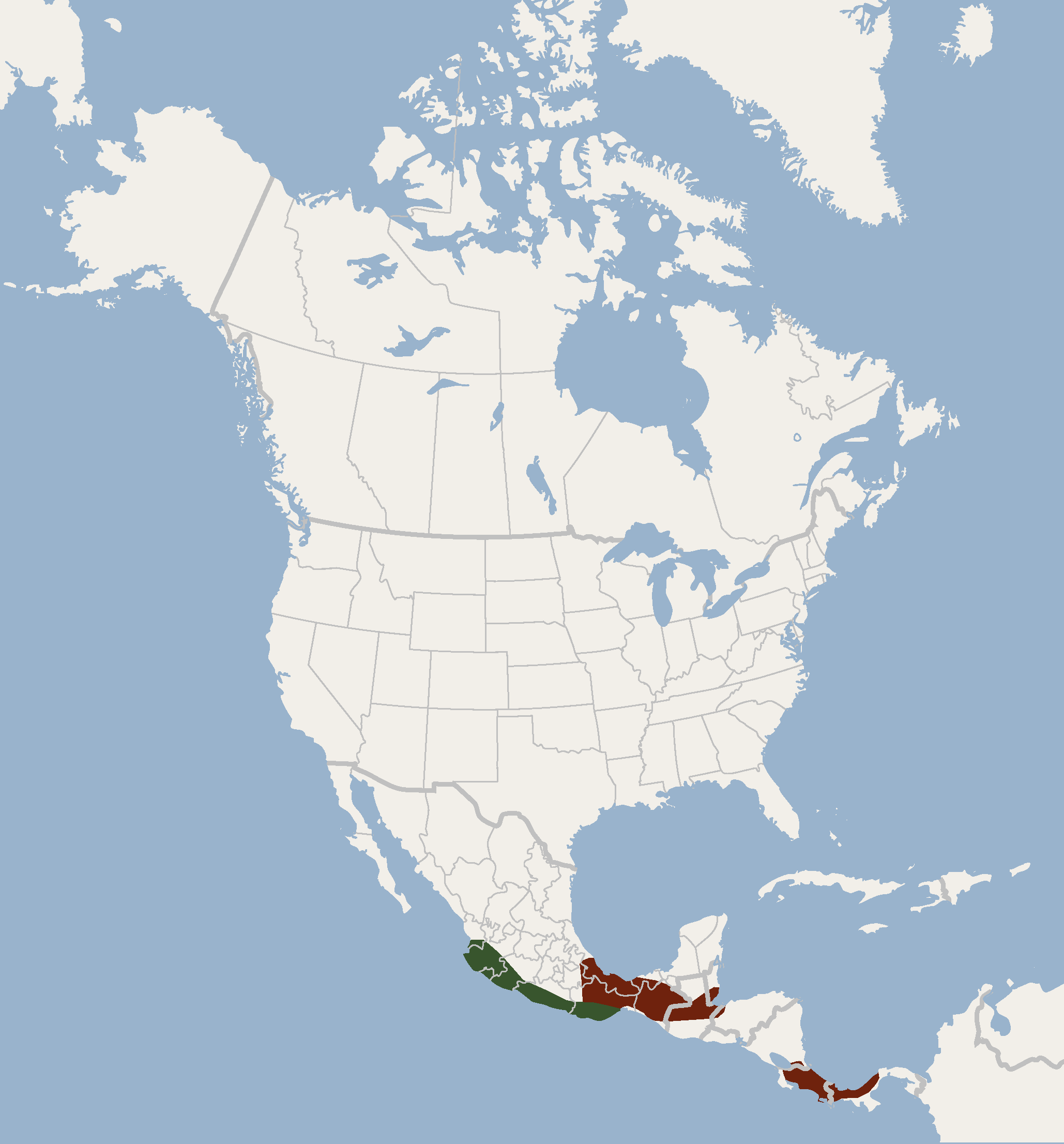

= Underwood's long-tongued bat =

Species of mammals belonging to the New World leaf-nosed bat family

Underwood's long-tongued bat (Hylonycteris underwoodi) is a species of bat in the family Phyllostomidae. It is the only species within the genus Hylonycteris. It is found in Belize, Guatemala, Mexico, Nicaragua, and Panama. Hylonycteris underwoodi feed on nectar, pollen grains, agave and fruits. This choice of food has allowed them to gain the ability of hovering flight, thereby evolving their body mass and size to compensate for the same.

== Taxonomy ==
It was described as a new species in 1903 by British mammalogist Oldfield Thomas. The holotype was collected by Cecil F. Underwood, who is the eponym for the species name "underwoodi".

== Predation ==
Predators of these bats likely include birds of prey, such as falcons and owls, snakes, and other small, arboreal predators.
