= Halysidota rusca =

Scientific classification
- Domain: Eukaryota
- Kingdom: Animalia
- Phylum: Arthropoda
- Class: Insecta
- Order: Lepidoptera
- Superfamily: Noctuoidea
- Family: Erebidae
- Subfamily: Arctiinae
- Genus: Halysidota
- Species: H. rusca

Binomial name
- Halysidota rusca (Schaus, 1896)

Synonyms
- Mazaeras rusca Schaus, 1896

Species of moth

Halysidota rusca is a moth of the family Erebidae. It was described by William Schaus in 1896. It is found in southern Brazil.
