= Halysidota elota =

Scientific classification
- Domain: Eukaryota
- Kingdom: Animalia
- Phylum: Arthropoda
- Class: Insecta
- Order: Lepidoptera
- Superfamily: Noctuoidea
- Family: Erebidae
- Subfamily: Arctiinae
- Genus: Halysidota
- Species: H. elota

Binomial name
- Halysidota elota (Möschler, 1886)

Synonyms
- Halesidota elota Möschler, 1886; Euphalisidota elota; Opharus elota

Species of moth

Halysidota elota is a moth of the family Erebidae. It was described by Heinrich Benno Möschler in 1886. It is found on Jamaica.
