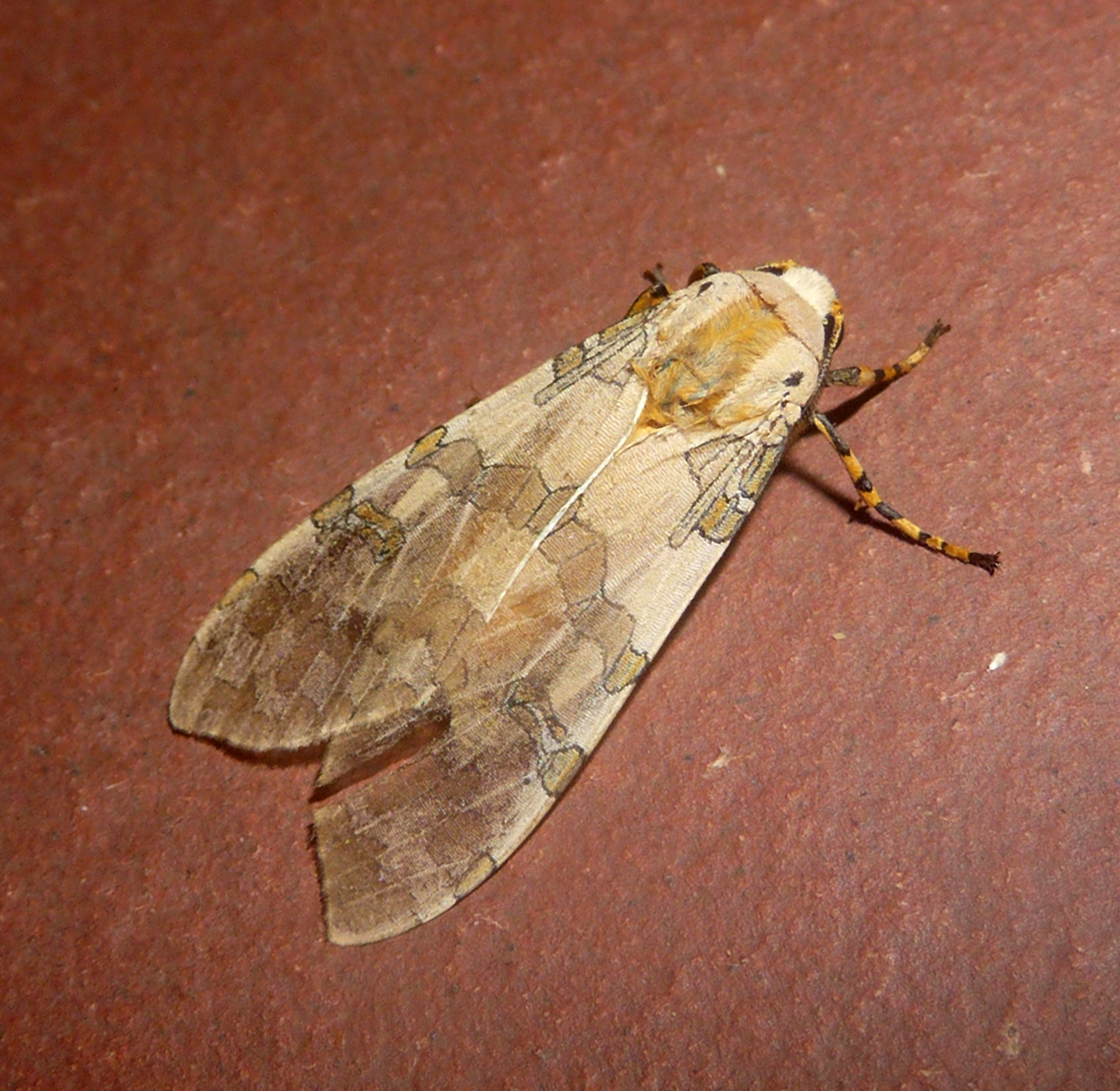

Scientific classification
- Domain: Eukaryota
- Kingdom: Animalia
- Phylum: Arthropoda
- Class: Insecta
- Order: Lepidoptera
- Superfamily: Noctuoidea
- Family: Erebidae
- Subfamily: Arctiinae
- Genus: Halysidota
- Species: H. orientalis

Binomial name
- Halysidota orientalis Rothschild, 1909

Synonyms
- Halisidota underwoodi orientalis Rothschild, 1909; Halisidota underwoodi modalis Dyar, 1912

= Halysidota orientalis =

Species of moth

Halysidota orientalis is a moth of the family Erebidae. It was described by Walter Rothschild in 1909. It is found in Mexico, Guatemala, Costa Rica, Panama, the Antilles, Colombia, Venezuela, Ecuador, Peru, Bolivia, French Guiana, Brazil (Para, São Paulo) and possibly Chile.

The larvae have been recorded feeding on Morus alba.
