= Halysidota steinbachi =

Scientific classification
- Domain: Eukaryota
- Kingdom: Animalia
- Phylum: Arthropoda
- Class: Insecta
- Order: Lepidoptera
- Superfamily: Noctuoidea
- Family: Erebidae
- Subfamily: Arctiinae
- Genus: Halysidota
- Species: H. steinbachi

Binomial name
- Halysidota steinbachi Rothschild, 1909

Species of moth

Halysidota steinbachi is a moth of the family Erebidae. It was described by Walter Rothschild in 1909. It is found in Argentina, Bolivia and Brazil.

The larvae feed on Celtis species (including C. spinosa) and Ruellia longifolia.
