= Halysidota pectenella =

Scientific classification
- Domain: Eukaryota
- Kingdom: Animalia
- Phylum: Arthropoda
- Class: Insecta
- Order: Lepidoptera
- Superfamily: Noctuoidea
- Family: Erebidae
- Subfamily: Arctiinae
- Genus: Halysidota
- Species: H. pectenella

Binomial name
- Halysidota pectenella Watson, 1980

Species of moth

Halysidota pectenella is a moth of the family Erebidae. It was described by Watson in 1980. It is found in Mexico, Guatemala, El Salvador, Costa Rica, Colombia, Venezuela, French Guiana, Ecuador, Peru, Bolivia and possibly Brazil.
