= Cecil F. Underwood =

British ornithologist (1867–1943)

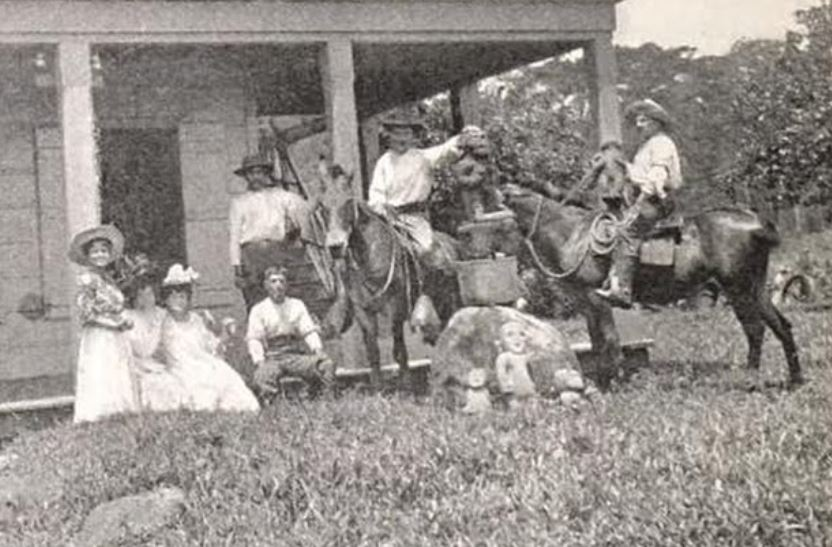
Cecil F. Underwood with assistants and archaeological artifacts

Cecil Frank Underwood (26 October 1867–19 August 1943) was a British scientific collector of mammal and bird specimens in Central America.

== Early life ==
Underwood was born on 26 October 1867 in London, England. His parents were George and Amelia Dodd Underwood. During his early life, he was an apprentice for a taxidermist. On behalf of the British Museum of Natural History, Underwood traveled to the U.S., arriving in New York on 26 October 1888, which was his twenty-first birthday.

== Career ==
In April 1889, he left the U.S. for Costa Rica. He largely remained in Costa Rica for the rest of his life, though he made extensive trips to Honduras for specimen collecting from 1932 to 1938.

While Underwood primarily focused on birds and mammals, he collected other taxa as well such as freshwater fish.

=== Namesake species ===
- Underwood's long-tongued bat (Hylonycteris underwoodi)
- Underwood's bonneted bat (Eumops underwoodi)
- Underwood's water mouse (Rheomys underwoodi)
- Craugastor underwoodi—A species of frog
- Melese underwoodi—A species of moth
- Underwood's tussock moth (Halysidota underwoodi)
- Symphlebia underwoodi—A species of moth

=== Archaeology ===
Underwood also collected archaeological artifacts in Costa Rica. American businessman Minor Cooper Keith commissioned Underwood to gather artifacts from natives' mounds and burial grounds.

== Personal life ==
Underwood had at least one child, a son named Edwin G. Underwood, who was an industrial engineer in San José, Costa Rica.

== Death ==
Underwood died on 19 August 1943 in San José, following a short illness.
