= Leschenaultia exul =

Scientific classification
- Kingdom: Animalia
- Phylum: Arthropoda
- Class: Insecta
- Order: Diptera
- Family: Tachinidae
- Subfamily: Exoristinae
- Tribe: Goniini
- Genus: Leschenaultia
- Species: L. exul

Binomial name
- Leschenaultia exul (Townsend, 1892)

Synonyms
- Blepharipeza exul Townsend, 1892

Species of fly

Leschenaultia exul is a species of bristle fly in the family Tachinidae.

== Distribution ==
Canada, United States.
