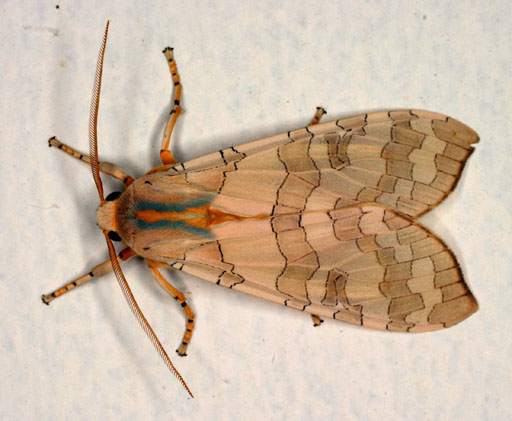
- Halysidota tessellaris

Scientific classification
- Kingdom: Animalia
- Phylum: Arthropoda
- Clade: Pancrustacea
- Class: Insecta
- Order: Lepidoptera
- Superfamily: Noctuoidea
- Family: Erebidae
- Subfamily: Arctiinae
- Subtribe: Phaegopterina
- Genus: Halysidota; Hübner, 1819

Type species
- Phalaena tessellaris Smith, 1797

Synonyms
- Alysidota Agassiz, 1847

= Halysidota =

Genus of moths

Halysidota is a genus of moths in the family Erebidae. The genus was erected by Jacob Hübner in 1819.

== Species ==
- Halysidota ata Watson, 1980
- Halysidota atra Druce, 1884
- Halysidota baritioides Rothschild, 1909
- Halysidota brasiliensis Rothschild, 1909
- Halysidota cinctipes Grote, 1865 – Florida tussock moth
- Halysidota conflua Watson, 1980
- Halysidota davisii H. Edwards, 1874 – Davis' tussock moth
- Halysidota donahuei Watson, 1980
- Halysidota elota (Möschler, 1886)
- Halysidota eudolobata Hampson, 1901
- Halysidota fuliginosa Rothschild, 1909
- Halysidota fumosa Schaus, 1912
- Halysidota grata Walker, 1866
- Halysidota harrisii Walsh, 1864 – sycamore tussock moth
- Halysidota instabilis Dyar, 1912
- Halysidota insularis Rothschild, 1909
- Halysidota intensa Rothschild, 1909
- Halysidota interlineata Walker, 1855
- Halysidota interstriata (Hampson, 1901)
- Halysidota leda (Druce, 1890)
- Halysidota masoni (Schaus, 1895)
- Halysidota meridionalis Rothschild, 1909
- Halysidota nigrilinea Watson, 1980
- Halysidota orientalis Rothschild, 1909
- Halysidota pearsoni Watson, 1980
- Halysidota pectenella Watson, 1980
- Halysidota rhoda (Hampson, 1901)
- Halysidota roseofasciata (Druce, 1906)
- Halysidota rusca (Schaus, 1896)
- Halysidota ruscheweyhi Dyar, 1912
- Halysidota schausi Rothschild, 1909 – Schaus' tussock moth
- Halysidota semibrunnea (Druce, 1906)
- Halysidota steinbachi Rothschild, 1909
- Halysidota striata E. D. Jones, 1908
- Halysidota tessellaris Smith, 1797 – pale tiger moth
- Halysidota torniplaga Reich, 1935
- Halysidota tucumanicola Strand, 1919
- Halysidota underwoodi Rothschild, 1909
- Halysidota yapacaniae Watson, 1980

== Former species ==
- Halysidota anapheoides Rothschild, 1909
- Halysidota grandis (Rothschild, 1909)
- Halysidota humosa (Dognin, 1893)
- Halysidota melaleuca (Felder, 1874)
- Halysidota mexiconis Strand, 1919
- Halysidota triphylia (Druce, 1896)
