= Halysidota conflua =

Scientific classification
- Domain: Eukaryota
- Kingdom: Animalia
- Phylum: Arthropoda
- Class: Insecta
- Order: Lepidoptera
- Superfamily: Noctuoidea
- Family: Erebidae
- Subfamily: Arctiinae
- Genus: Halysidota
- Species: H. conflua

Binomial name
- Halysidota conflua Watson, 1980

Species of moth

Halysidota conflua is a moth of the family Erebidae. It was described by Allan Watson in 1980. It is found in Peru.
