= Halysidota underwoodi =

Scientific classification
- Domain: Eukaryota
- Kingdom: Animalia
- Phylum: Arthropoda
- Class: Insecta
- Order: Lepidoptera
- Superfamily: Noctuoidea
- Family: Erebidae
- Subfamily: Arctiinae
- Genus: Halysidota
- Species: H. underwoodi

Binomial name
- Halysidota underwoodi Rothschild, 1909

Synonyms
- Halisidota bricenoi Rothschild, 1909; Halisidota schausi meridensis Rothschild, 1909; Halysidota cinctipes var. lucia Strand, 1919

Species of moth

Halysidota underwoodi, or Underwood's tussock moth, is a moth of the family Erebidae. It was described by Walter Rothschild in 1909. It is found in Mexico, Guatemala, Nicaragua, Costa Rica, Panama, Colombia, Venezuela, Ecuador, Peru and Bolivia.

The species was named after Cecil F. Underwood.

The larvae feed on Acalypha species.
