= Pseudischnocampa nigridorsata =

Scientific classification
- Domain: Eukaryota
- Kingdom: Animalia
- Phylum: Arthropoda
- Class: Insecta
- Order: Lepidoptera
- Superfamily: Noctuoidea
- Family: Erebidae
- Subfamily: Arctiinae
- Genus: Pseudischnocampa
- Species: P. nigridorsata

Binomial name
- Pseudischnocampa nigridorsata (Schaus, 1901)

Synonyms
- Ischnocampa nigridorsata Schaus, 1901; Pseudischnocampa fulvonebulosa Reich, 1938

Species of moth

Pseudischnocampa nigridorsata is a moth in the family Erebidae. It was described by William Schaus in 1901. It is found in Peru, Argentina and Ecuador.

== Subspecies ==
- Pseudischnocampa nigridorsata nigridorsata (Peru)
- Pseudischnocampa nigridorsata albidior Rothschild, 1935 (Argentina)
- Pseudischnocampa nigridorsata fulvonebulosa Reich, 1938 (Ecuador)
