= Halysidota eudolobata =

Scientific classification
- Kingdom: Animalia
- Phylum: Arthropoda
- Class: Insecta
- Order: Lepidoptera
- Superfamily: Noctuoidea
- Family: Erebidae
- Subfamily: Arctiinae
- Genus: Halysidota
- Species: H. eudolobata

Binomial name
- Halysidota eudolobata Hampson, 1901

Species of moth

Halysidota eudolobata is a moth of the family Erebidae. It was described by George Hampson in 1901. It is found in the Amazon region.

The wingspan is about 40 mm. The forewings are ochreous with about ten waved brown lines forming spots on the postmedial area. There are also somewhat diamond-shaped subterminal spots and a large clouded discoidal spot. The hindwings are pale semihyaline yellow.
