= Halysidota fumosa =

Scientific classification
- Domain: Eukaryota
- Kingdom: Animalia
- Phylum: Arthropoda
- Class: Insecta
- Order: Lepidoptera
- Superfamily: Noctuoidea
- Family: Erebidae
- Subfamily: Arctiinae
- Genus: Halysidota
- Species: H. fumosa

Binomial name
- Halysidota fumosa Schaus, 1912

Synonyms
- Halisidota cinctipes fumosa Schaus, 1912

Species of moth

Halysidota fumosa is a moth of the family Erebidae. It was described by William Schaus in 1912. It is found in Costa Rica, Colombia and Ecuador.
