= Pseudischnocampa nigrivena =

Scientific classification
- Domain: Eukaryota
- Kingdom: Animalia
- Phylum: Arthropoda
- Class: Insecta
- Order: Lepidoptera
- Superfamily: Noctuoidea
- Family: Erebidae
- Subfamily: Arctiinae
- Genus: Pseudischnocampa
- Species: P. nigrivena

Binomial name
- Pseudischnocampa nigrivena (Schaus, 1901)

Synonyms
- Ischnocampa nigrivena Schaus, 1901

Species of moth

Pseudischnocampa nigrivena is a moth in the family Erebidae. It was described by William Schaus in 1901. It is found in Bolivia.
