= Pseudischnocampa diluta =

Scientific classification
- Kingdom: Animalia
- Phylum: Arthropoda
- Class: Insecta
- Order: Lepidoptera
- Superfamily: Noctuoidea
- Family: Erebidae
- Subfamily: Arctiinae
- Genus: Pseudischnocampa
- Species: P. diluta

Binomial name
- Pseudischnocampa diluta Toulgoët, 1986

Species of moth

Pseudischnocampa diluta is a moth in the family Erebidae. It was described by Hervé de Toulgoët in 1986. It is found in Peru.
