= Halysidota tucumanicola =

Scientific classification
- Domain: Eukaryota
- Kingdom: Animalia
- Phylum: Arthropoda
- Class: Insecta
- Order: Lepidoptera
- Superfamily: Noctuoidea
- Family: Erebidae
- Subfamily: Arctiinae
- Genus: Halysidota
- Species: H. tucumanicola

Binomial name
- Halysidota tucumanicola Strand, 1919

Synonyms
- Halisidota schausi tucumana Rothschild, 1909 (preocc. Rothschild, 1909); Halisidota cinctipes v. tucumanicola Strand, 1919

Species of moth

Halysidota tucumanicola is a moth of the family Erebidae. It was described by Embrik Strand in 1919. It is found in Argentina.

The larvae possibly feed on Celtis and Trema species.
