= Pseudischnocampa humosa =

Scientific classification
- Domain: Eukaryota
- Kingdom: Animalia
- Phylum: Arthropoda
- Class: Insecta
- Order: Lepidoptera
- Superfamily: Noctuoidea
- Family: Erebidae
- Subfamily: Arctiinae
- Genus: Pseudischnocampa
- Species: P. humosa

Binomial name
- Pseudischnocampa humosa (Dognin, 1893)

Synonyms
- Halysidota humosa (Dognin, 1893); Lophocampa humosa Dognin, 1893

Species of moth

Pseudischnocampa humosa is a moth of the family Erebidae. It was described by Paul Dognin in 1893. It is found in Ecuador.
