= Halysidota pearsoni =

Scientific classification
- Domain: Eukaryota
- Kingdom: Animalia
- Phylum: Arthropoda
- Class: Insecta
- Order: Lepidoptera
- Superfamily: Noctuoidea
- Family: Erebidae
- Subfamily: Arctiinae
- Genus: Halysidota
- Species: H. pearsoni

Binomial name
- Halysidota pearsoni Watson, 1980

Species of moth

Halysidota pearsoni is a moth of the family Erebidae. It was described by Watson in 1980. It is found in southern Brazil (Santa Catarina, Rio Grande do Sul, Parana, Rio de Janeiro, São Paulo, Espirito Santo) and Paraguay.
