= Halysidota cinctipes =

Scientific classification
- Kingdom: Animalia
- Phylum: Arthropoda
- Class: Insecta
- Order: Lepidoptera
- Superfamily: Noctuoidea
- Family: Erebidae
- Subfamily: Arctiinae
- Genus: Halysidota
- Species: H. cinctipes

Binomial name
- Halysidota cinctipes Grote, 1865

Species of moth

Halysidota cinctipes, the gartered halysidota or Florida tussock moth, is a species of moth in the family Erebidae. It was described by Augustus Radcliffe Grote in 1865. It is found on Cuba, Haiti, the Bahamas and in the US states of Florida, Texas, Arizona and California. The range possibly extends through Mexico, Guatemala, Costa Rica and Panama to Venezuela, Brazil and Peru.

The wingspan is about 42 mm.

The larvae feed on Coccoloba floridana, Coccoloba uvifera, Hibiscus species and possibly Trema micrantha.
