= Prunasin beta-glucosidase =

Class of enzymes

Prunasin β-glucosidase

Identifiers
- EC no.: 3.2.1.118
- CAS no.: 9023-41-0

Databases
- BRENDA: enzyme data
- ExPASy: NiceZyme view
- KEGG: enzyme entry
- MetaCyc: metabolic pathway
- Rhea: reactions
- PDB structures: RCSB PDB PDBe PDBsum
- Gene Ontology: AmiGO / QuickGO
Search
- PMC: articles
- PubMed: articles
- NCBI: proteins

Prunasin β-glucosidase (EC 3.2.1.118) is an enzyme characterised from Prunus serotina that catalyzes the chemical reaction:

prunasin
H_{2}O
(+)-mandelonitrile
+
D-glucose

The cyanogenic glycoside, prunasin, is produced from amygdalin by a similar hydrolysis reaction catalysed by amygdalin beta-glucosidase. Bacteria can produce hydrogen cyanide as a defense mechanism via these pathways.

The enzyme is a hydrolase, specifically a glycosidase that hydrolyses O- and S-glycosyl compounds. The systematic name is prunasin β-D-glucohydrolase. It is also called prunasin hydrolase.
