= Pseudischnocampa triphylia =

Scientific classification
- Domain: Eukaryota
- Kingdom: Animalia
- Phylum: Arthropoda
- Class: Insecta
- Order: Lepidoptera
- Superfamily: Noctuoidea
- Family: Erebidae
- Subfamily: Arctiinae
- Genus: Pseudischnocampa
- Species: P. triphylia

Binomial name
- Pseudischnocampa triphylia (H. Druce, 1896)

Synonyms
- Halysidota triphylia (H. Druce, 1896); Phaegoptera triphylia H. Druce, 1896

Species of moth

Pseudischnocampa triphylia is a moth of the family Erebidae. It was described by Herbert Druce in 1896. It is found in Panama.
