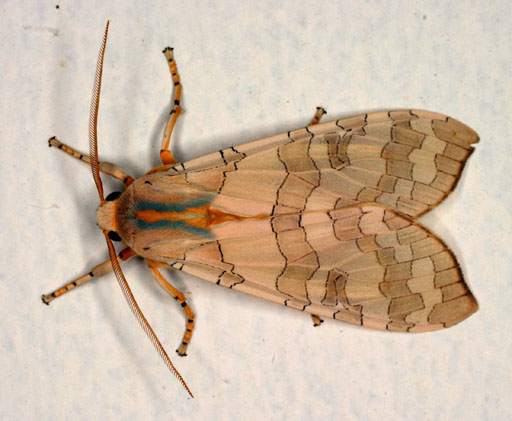

Conservation status
- Secure (NatureServe)

Scientific classification
- Kingdom: Animalia
- Phylum: Arthropoda
- Clade: Pancrustacea
- Class: Insecta
- Order: Lepidoptera
- Superfamily: Noctuoidea
- Family: Erebidae
- Subfamily: Arctiinae
- Genus: Halysidota
- Species: H. tessellaris

Binomial name
- Halysidota tessellaris (J. E. Smith, 1797)

Synonyms
- Phalaena tessellaris Smith, 1797; Halysidota (Lophocampa) antiphola Walsh, 1864; Halisidota oslari Rothschild, 1909; Halysidota tessellaris ab. antipholella Strand, 1919; Halysidota tessellaris ab. tesselaroides Strand, 1919

= Halysidota tessellaris =

Species of moth

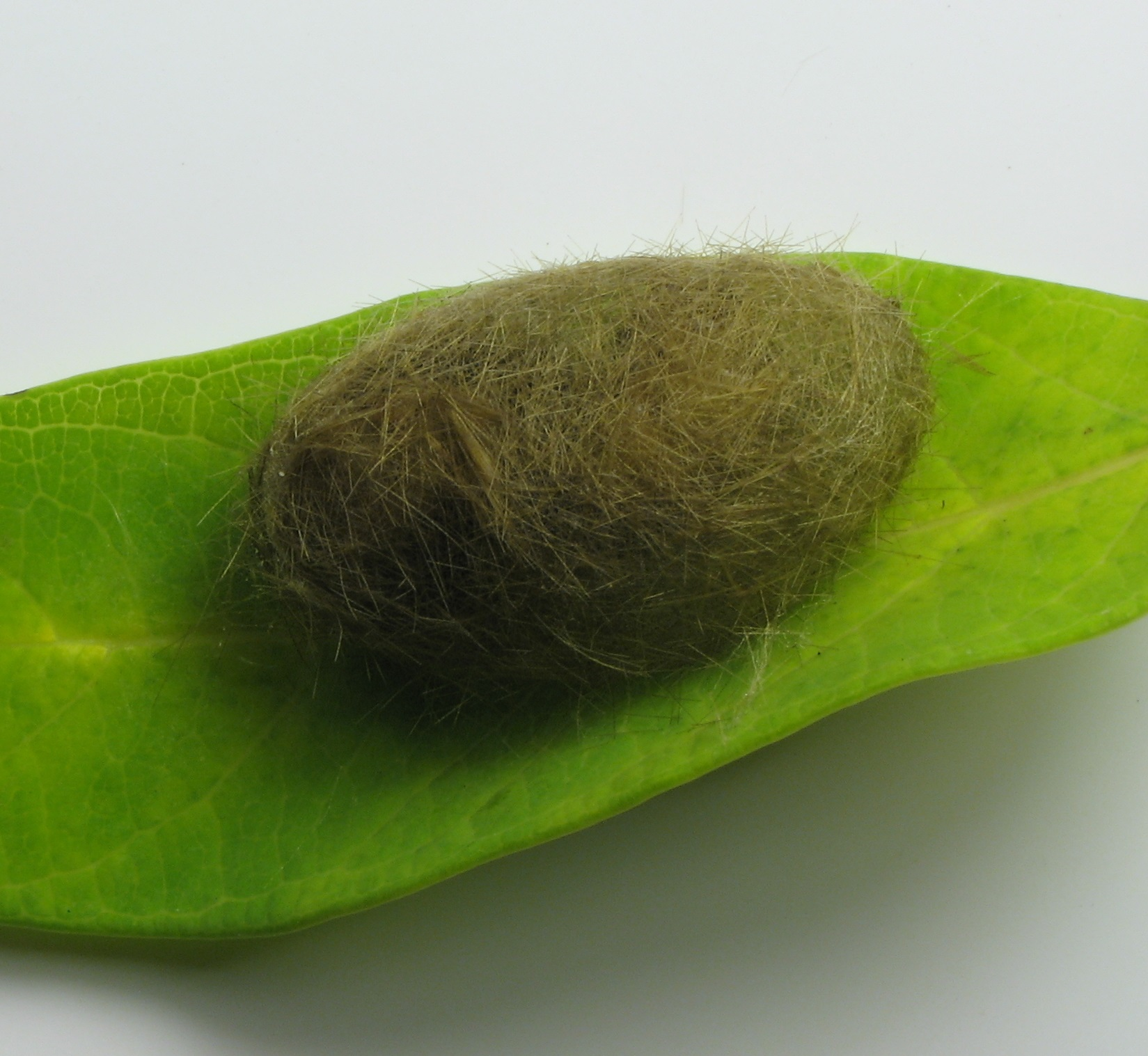
Halysidota tessellaris Cocoon

Halysidota tessellaris, also called the pale tiger moth, banded tussock moth, and tessellated halisidota, is in the family Erebidae and the tribe Arctiini, the tiger moths. The species was first described by James Edward Smith in 1797. Like many related species, adult moths have chemical defenses acquired from its host plants, in this case, alkaloids. Larval behaviors suggest that they are chemically protected; they have not been analyzed for alkaloid content.

== Range ==
This moth is found in North America from southern Canada south through Texas and central Florida.

== Life cycle ==
One generation per year occurs in the north, and two or more occur in the south.

=== Egg ===
Eggs are laid in masses on the undersides of leaves.

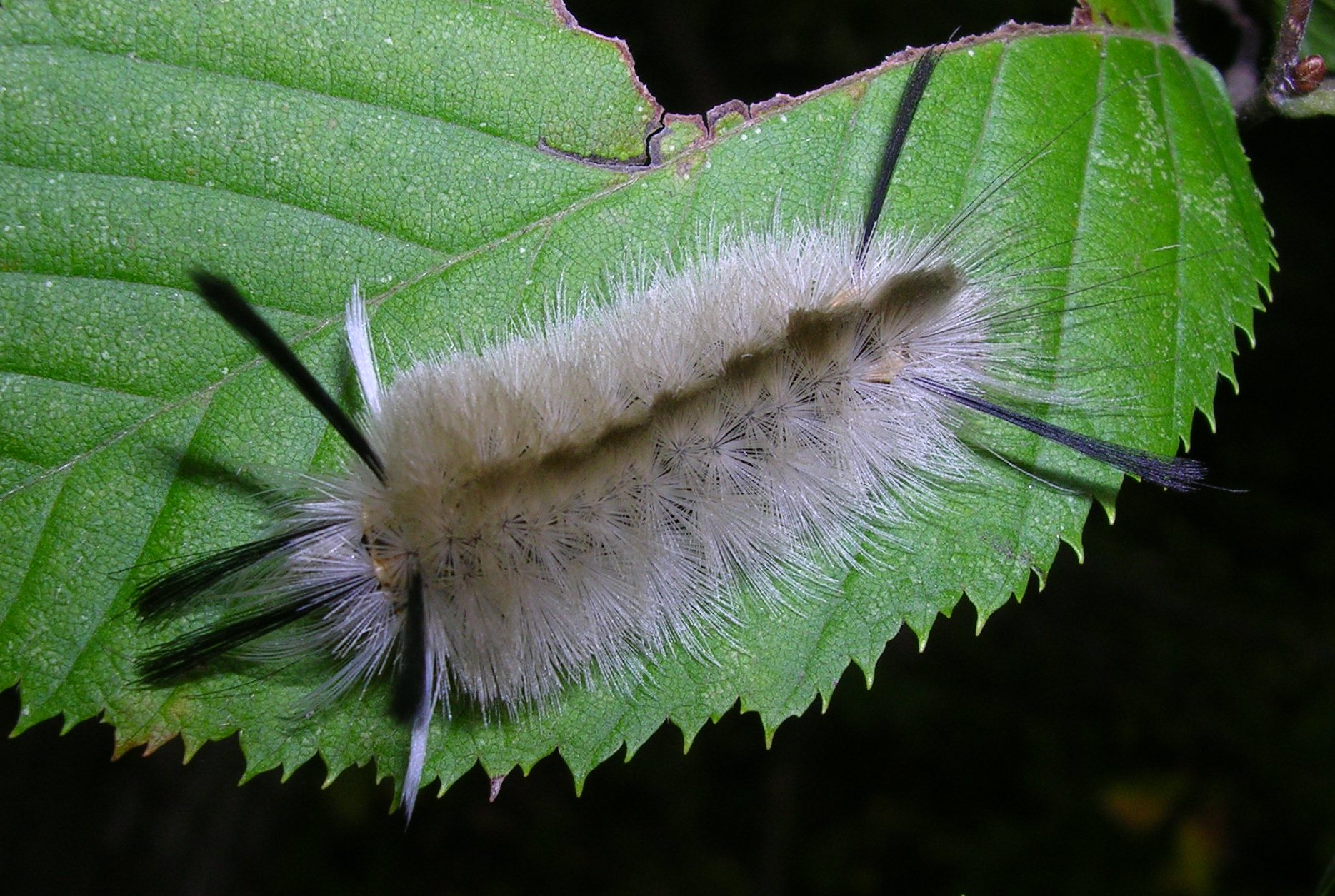
Halysidota tessellaris Larva

=== Larva ===
Caterpillars are covered with long setae, in tufts. They vary from yellowish and orange through dark gray. Extra long hair-pencils of white, black, and/or orange occur at both the front and rear of a caterpillar. Larval head capsules are bright orange. In the north, mature caterpillars are found from July to frost. Caterpillars frequently rest on the upper surface of leaves, and though not gregarious, they are very conspicuous. They grow to a length of up to 1.75 inches (44 mm). The hairs are urticating and easily dispersed by the caterpillar.

=== Pupa ===
Pupae overwinter in gray cocoons laced with larval hairs.

=== Adults ===
Wings are light brown. Forewings have bands of beige edged in black. The body is 'hairy' and yellow. The thorax has blue-green lines on its uppersides. Adults are attracted to decaying plants with pyrrolizidine alkaloids. They regurgitate on them, then drink the fluids, and acquire defensive chemicals.

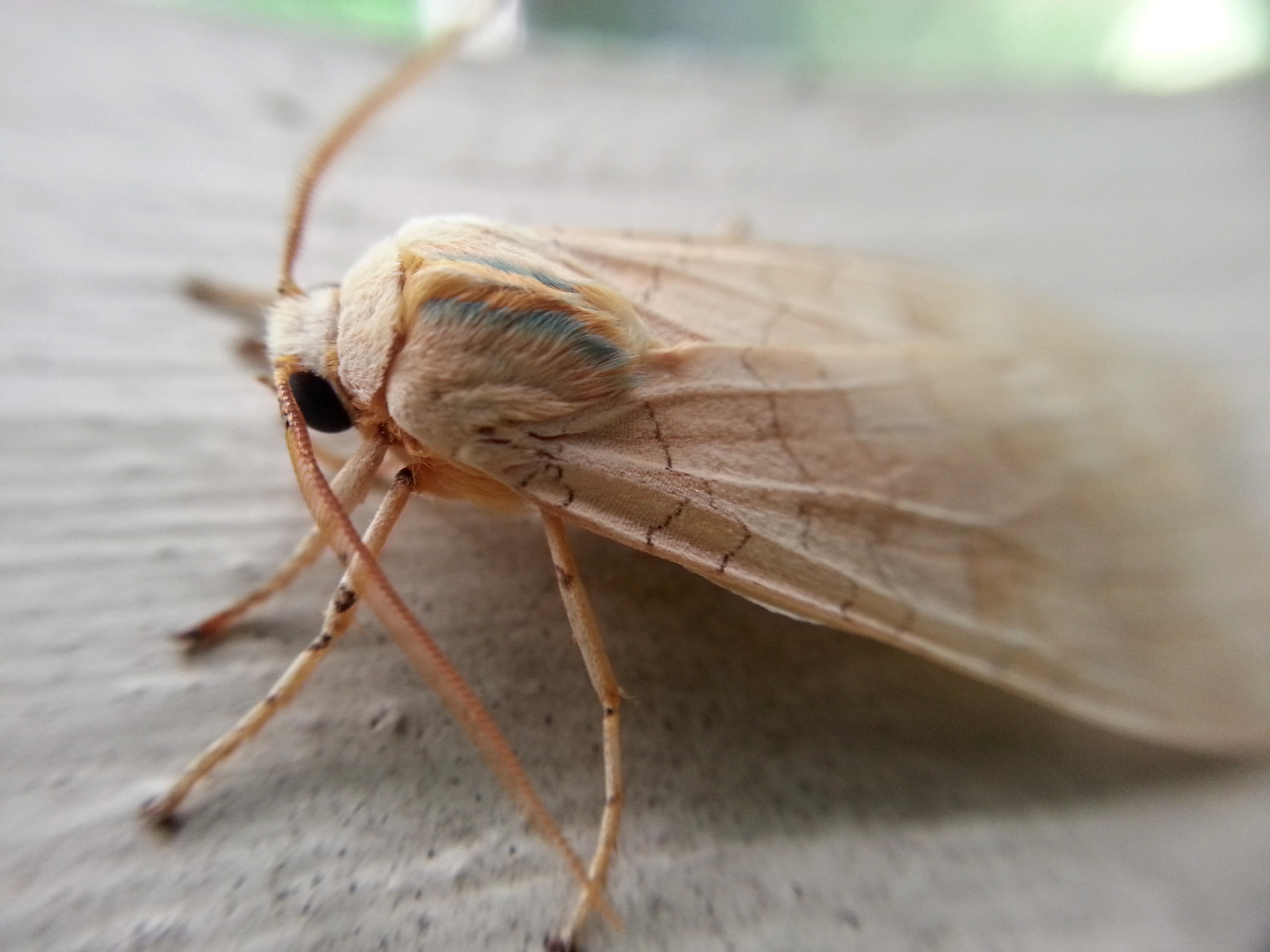
Close-up of a pale tiger moth, with blue and orange hairs visible on its thorax

The moth appears very similar to the sycamore tussock moth (Halysidota harrisii) in the adult stage and may be distinguished based on differences in genitalia.

== Food plants ==
Larvae are known to feed on some species of alder, ash, birch, blueberry, chestnut, elm, grape, hackberry, hazel, oak, walnut, willow, and many others. No serious injury to trees has been reported for this late-season feeder.
