= Amygdalin beta-glucosidase =

Class of enzymes

amygdalin β-glucosidase

Identifiers
- EC no.: 3.2.1.117
- CAS no.: 51683-43-3

Databases
- BRENDA: enzyme data
- ExPASy: NiceZyme view
- KEGG: enzyme entry
- MetaCyc: metabolic pathway
- Rhea: reactions
- PDB structures: RCSB PDB PDBe PDBsum
- Gene Ontology: AmiGO / QuickGO
Search
- PMC: articles
- PubMed: articles
- NCBI: proteins

The enzyme amygdalin β-glucosidase (EC 3.2.1.117) characterised from Prunus serotina hydrolyses the cyanogenic glycoside, amygdalin, to prunasin and D-glucose. Prunasin can similarly be further metabolised to give mandelonitrile and a second unit of glucose by the enzyme prunasin beta-glucosidase.

amygdalin
H_{2}O
prunasin
+
D-glucose

The reaction in Penicillium aurantiogriseum can be completely inhibited by the action of glucono-δ-lactone at 1 mM concentration.

This enzyme is a hydrolase, specifically a glycosidase that hydrolyses O- and S-glycosyl compounds. The systematic name of this enzyme class is amygdalin beta-D-glucohydrolase. Other names in common use include amygdalase, amygdalinase, amygdalin hydrolase, and amygdalin glucosidase.
