= Phenylglyoxylic acid =

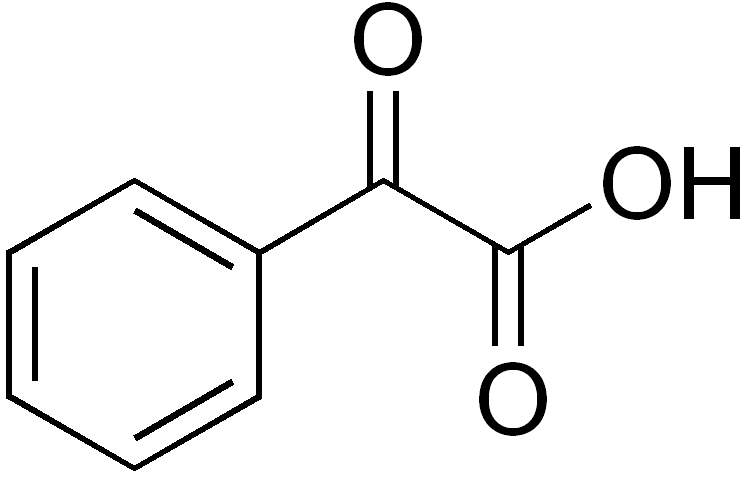

Names
- Preferred IUPAC name Oxo(phenyl)acetic acid
- Other names Benzoyl formate Phenylglyoxalic acid Phenylglyoxylate

Identifiers
CAS Number	611-73-4
3D model (JSmol)	Interactive image
ChEBI	CHEBI:18280
ChemSpider	11421
ECHA InfoCard	100.009.345
EC Number	210-278-7
KEGG	C02137
PubChem CID	11915
UNII	2PZL5A0W0M
CompTox Dashboard (EPA)	DTXSID80209993
- InChI: InChI=1S/C8H6O3/c9-7(8(10)11)6-4-2-1-3-5-6/h1-5H,(H,10,11) Key: FAQJJMHZNSSFSM-UHFFFAOYSA-N; InChI=1/C8H6O3/c9-7(8(10)11)6-4-2-1-3-5-6/h1-5H,(H,10,11) Key: FAQJJMHZNSSFSM-UHFFFAOYAS
- SMILES: C1=CC=C(C=C1)C(=O)C(=O)O

Properties
Chemical formula	C_{8}H_{6}O_{3}
Molar mass	150.13 g/mol
Appearance	colorless solid
Melting point	64 to 66 °C (147 to 151 °F; 337 to 339 K)
- Except where otherwise noted, data are given for materials in their standard state (at 25 °C [77 °F], 100 kPa). verify (what is ?) Infobox references

Phenylglyoxylic acid is the organic compound with the formula C_{6}H_{5}C(O)CO_{2}H. The conjugate base, known as benzoylformate, is the substrate of benzoylformate decarboxylase, a thiamine diphosphate-dependent enzyme:

benzoylformate + H^{+} ⇌ benzaldehyde + CO_{2}

It is a colourless solid with a melting point of 64–66 °C and is moderately acidic (pK_{a} = 2.15).

Phenylglyoxylic acid can be synthesized by oxidation of mandelic acid with potassium permanganate. An alternative synthesis involves hydrolysis of benzoyl cyanide.
