= Prunasin =

Names
- IUPAC name (R)-(β-D-Glucopyranosyloxy)(phenyl)acetonitrile
- Systematic IUPAC name (R)-Phenyl{[(2R,3R,4S,5S,6R)-3,4,5-trihydroxy-6-(hydroxymethyl)oxan-2-yl]oxy}acetonitrile
- Other names (R)-Prunasin; D-Prunasin; D-Mandelonitrile-β-D-glucoside; Prulaurasin Laurocerasin; Sambunigrin

Identifiers
CAS Number	99-18-3
3D model (JSmol)	Interactive image
ChEBI	CHEBI:17396
ChemSpider	106360
ECHA InfoCard	100.002.489
EC Number	202-738-0
KEGG	C00844
PubChem CID	119033
UNII	14W4BPM5FB
CompTox Dashboard (EPA)	DTXSID001018995
- InChI: InChI=1S/C14H17NO6/c15-6-9(8-4-2-1-3-5-8)20-14-13(19)12(18)11(17)10(7-16)21-14/h1-5,9-14,16-19H,7H2/t9-,10+,11+,12-,13+,14+/m0/s1 Key: ZKSZEJFBGODIJW-GMDXDWKASA-N; InChI=1/C14H17NO6/c15-6-9(8-4-2-1-3-5-8)20-14-13(19)12(18)11(17)10(7-16)21-14/h1-5,9-14,16-19H,7H2/t9-,10+,11+,12-,13+,14+/m0/s1 Key: ZKSZEJFBGODIJW-GMDXDWKABY
- SMILES: C1=CC=C(C=C1)[C@H](C#N)O[C@H]2[C@@H]([C@H]([C@@H]([C@H](O2)CO)O)O)O

Properties
Chemical formula	C_{14}H_{17}NO_{6}
Molar mass	295.291 g·mol^{−1}
- Except where otherwise noted, data are given for materials in their standard state (at 25 °C [77 °F], 100 kPa). Infobox references

(R)-prunasin is a cyanogenic glycoside related to amygdalin. Chemically, it is the glucoside of (R)-mandelonitrile.

== Natural occurrences ==
Prunasin is found in species in the genus Prunus such as Prunus japonica or P. maximowiczii and in bitter almonds. It is also found in leaves and stems of Olinia ventosa, O. radiata, O. emarginata and O. rochetiana and in Acacia greggii. It is a biosynthetic precursor of and intermediate in the biosynthesis of amygdalin, the chemical compound responsible for the taste of bitter almond.

It is also found in dandelion coffee, a coffee substitute.

=== Sambunigrin ===
Sambunigrin, a diastereomer of prunasin derived from (S)-mandelonitrile instead of it the (R)-isomer, has been isolated from leaves of the elder tree (Sambucus nigra). Sambunigrin is present in the leaves and stems of elder at a 1:3 ratio of sambunigrin to prunasin, and 2:5 in the immature seed. It is not found in the root.

== Biosynthesis ==
=== Overview ===
(R)-Prunasin begins with the common amino acid phenylalanine, which in plants is produced via the Shikimate pathway in primary metabolism. The pathway is catalyzed mainly by two cytochrome P450 (CYP) enzymes and a UDP-glucosyltransferase (UGT). After (R)-prunasin is formed, it is either converted into amygdalin by an additional UDP-glucosyltransferase or degraded into benzaldehyde and hydrogen cyanide.

Researchers have shown that the accumulation (or lack of) of prunasin and amygdalin in the almond kernel is responsible for sweet and bitter genotypes. Because amygdalin is responsible for the bitter almond taste, almond growers have selected genotypes which minimize the biosynthesis of amygdalin. The CYP enzymes responsible for generation of prunasin are conserved across Prunus species. There is a correlation between high concentration of prunasin in the vegetative regions of the plant and the sweetness of the almond, which is relevant to the almond agricultural industry. In almonds, the amygdalin biosynthetic genes are expressed at different levels in the tegument (mother tissue, or outer section) and cotyledon (kernel, or father tissue), and vary significantly during almond ontogeny. The biosynthesis of prunasin occurs in the tegument, then transported to other tissues for conversion to amygdalin or degraded.

=== Biosynthesis of (R)-prunasin ===
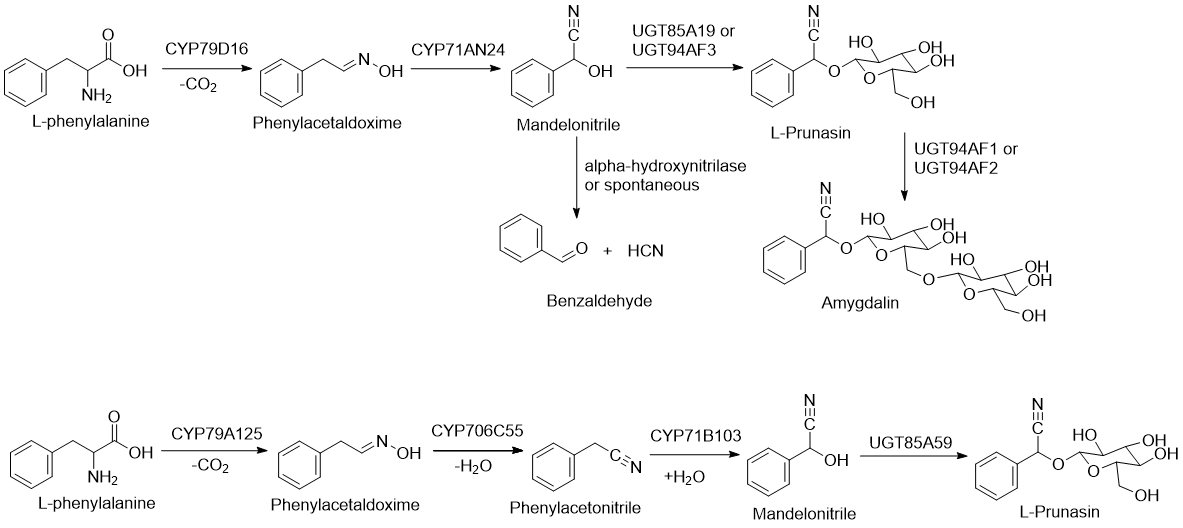
Biosynthetic pathway for the production of (R)-prunasin in Prunus species (top) and Eucalyptus cladocalyx (bottom)

==== Biosynthesis of (R)-prunasin in Prunus dulcis ====
L-phenylalanine is first hydroxylated by CYP79D16, followed by a decarboxylation and dehydration, forming the E-oxime phenylacetaldoxime. Next, CYP71AN24 catalyzes the rearrangement of the E-oxime to the Z-oxime followed by a dehydration and a hydroxylation to form mandelonitrile. Finally, UGT85A19 or UGT94AF3 utilize UDP-glucose to glycosylate mandelonitrile, forming (R)-prunasin.

After generating (R)-prunasin, the product is further glycosylated into amygdalin by either isoform UGT94AF1 or UGT94AF2. Expression of UGTAF1/2 and prunasin hydrolases results in a low overall concentration of (R)-prunasin in almond tissues. An alpha-glucosidase or prunasin hydrolase can convert (R)-prunasin to mandelonitrile, its precursor, which can then be spontaneously or enzymatically hydrolyzed to benzaldehyde and hydrogen cyanide.

==== Biosynthesis of (R)-prunasin in Eucalyptus cladocalyx ====
The biosynthesis of (R)-prunasin in E. cladocalyx, the sugar gum tree, has been shown to synthesize (R)-prunasin using an additional intermediate, phenylacetonitrile, using CYP706C55. The pathway proceeds similarly to the pathway in Prunus species, where the multifunctional CYP79A125 catalyzes the conversion of L-phenylalanine to phenylacetaldoxime. Then, CYP706C55 catalyzes the dehydration of phenylacetaldoxime to phenylacetonitrile. Phenylacetonitrile is then hydroxylated by CYP71B103 to mandelonitrile. After generating mandelonitrile, UGT85A59 transfers glucose to yield (R)-prunasin.

== Metabolic Pathway Interactions ==
As (R)-prunasin is a product of secondary metabolism, its generation and degradation affect multiple metabolic pathways by consuming L-phenylalanine or increasing quantities of benzaldehyde and toxic hydrogen cyanide through prunasin degradation.

Metabolic profiling in almond, cassava, and sorghum identified a potential recycling mechanism where (R)-prunasin and other cyanogen glycosides may be utilized for nitrogen storage and nitrogen recycling without generating HCN. In 2017, researchers used stable isotope labeling to demonstrate that ^{13}C-labeled L-phenylalanine incorporated in (R)-prunasin could be converted to benzaldehyde and to salicylic acid using mandelonitrile as an intermediate.

== Toxicity ==
The toxicity of prunasin is based in its degradation products: (R)-prunasin is hydrolyzed to form benzaldehyde and hydrogen cyanide, which causes toxicity. Plants containing prunasin may therefore be toxic to animals, particularly ruminants.

To degrade amygdalin to prunasin, amygdalin beta-glucosidase hydrolyzes the disaccharide to produce (R)-prunasin and D-glucose. Then, prunasin beta-glucosidase uses (R)-prunasin and water to produce D-glucose and mandelonitrile. After generating the aglycone mandelonitrile, then a mandelonitrile lyase can degrade the compound into benzaldehyde and hydrogen cyanide.
