= Benzoylformate decarboxylase =

Class of enzymes

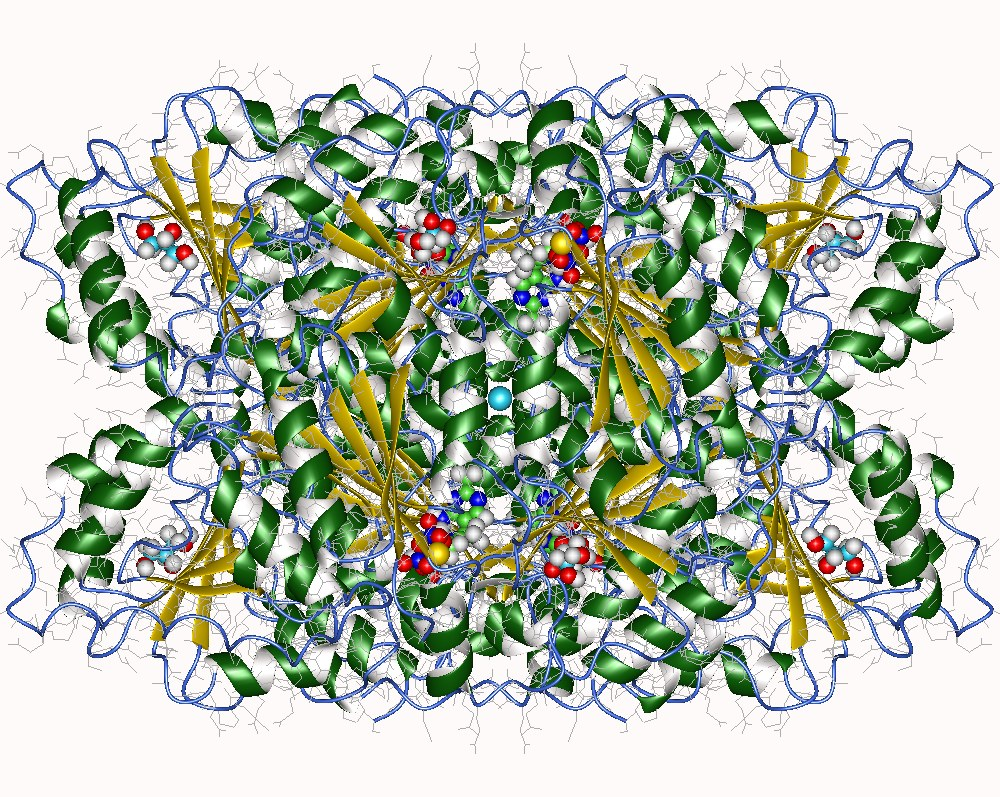
- Benzoylformate decarboxlyase tetramer, Pseudomonas putida

Identifiers
- EC no.: 4.1.1.7
- CAS no.: 9025-00-7

Databases
- BRENDA: enzyme data
- ExPASy: NiceZyme view
- KEGG: enzyme entry
- MetaCyc: metabolic pathway
- Rhea: reactions
- PDB structures: RCSB PDB PDBe PDBsum
- Gene Ontology: AmiGO / QuickGO
Search
- PMC: articles
- PubMed: articles
- NCBI: proteins

Benzoylformate decarboxylase (EC 4.1.1.7) is an enzyme characterised from Pseudomonas species that catalyzes the decarboxylation of benzoylformate (phenylglyoxylic acid) to benzaldehyde and carbon dioxide:

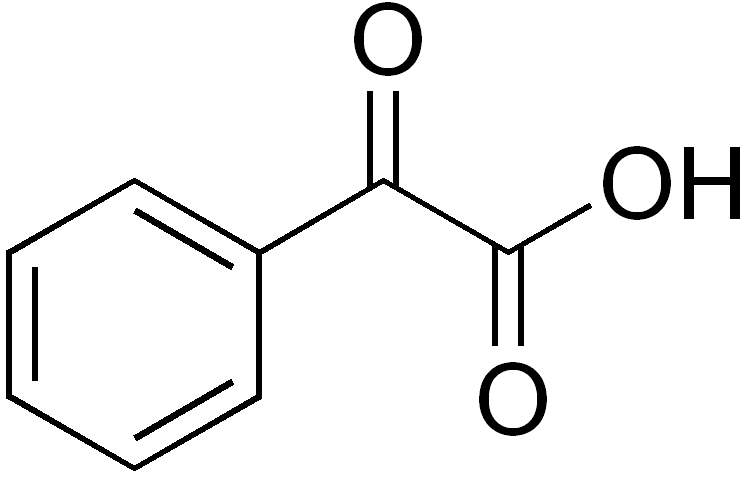
phenylglyoxylic acid
CO_{2}
benzaldehyde

The reaction is part of the breakdown pathway for mandelic acid in bacteria.

This enzyme is a lyase, specifically a carboxy-lyase, which cleave carbon-carbon bonds. The systematic name of this enzyme class is benzoylformate carboxy-lyase (benzaldehyde-forming). Other names in use include phenylglyoxylate decarboxylase, and benzoylformate carboxy-lyase. It uses thiamin diphosphate as a cofactor. These enzymes are of interest as they can be used in the synthesis of hydroxy ketones.

== Structural studies ==
As of late 2007, 8 structures have been solved for this class of enzymes, with PDB accession codes PDB: 1BFD, PDB: 1MCZ, PDB: 1PI3, PDB: 1PO7, PDB: 1Q6Z, PDB: 1YNO, PDB: 2FN3, and PDB: 2FWN.
