= (R)-oxynitrilase =

(R)-oxynitrilase may refer to:

- Aliphatic (R)-hydroxynitrile lyase, an enzyme
- Mandelonitrile lyase, an enzyme
