= Korean cherry =

Korean cherry is a common name for several flowering plants and may refer to:

- Prunus japonica, also known as Japanese bush cherry or Oriental bush cherry, with sour edible fruit, widely cultivated as an ornamental tree or shrub
- Prunus maximowiczii, also known as Korean mountain cherry or Miyama cherry, a cherry tree with edible fruit

== See also ==
- Nanking cherry
