= Vicianin =

- Chemical structure of vicianin

Names
- IUPAC name (R)-[α-L-Arabinopyranosyl-(1→6)-β-D-glucopyranosyloxy](phenyl)acetonitrile
- Systematic IUPAC name (R)-Phenyl{[(2R,3R,4S,5S,6R)-3,4,5-trihydroxy-6-({[(2S,3R,4S,5S)-3,4,5-trihydroxyoxan-2-yl]oxy}methyl)oxan-2-yl]oxy}acetonitrile
- Other names (R)-Vicianin; 6-O-Arabinopyranosylglucopyranoside β-Vicianoside

Identifiers
CAS Number	155-57-7
3D model (JSmol)	Interactive image
ChEBI	CHEBI:166510
ChemSpider	570879
KEGG	C01870
PubChem CID	656493
UNII	CQU61CXY3D
CompTox Dashboard (EPA)	DTXSID70935113
- InChI: InChI=1S/C19H25NO10/c20-6-11(9-4-2-1-3-5-9)29-19-17(26)15(24)14(23)12(30-19)8-28-18-16(25)13(22)10(21)7-27-18/h1-5,10-19,21-26H,7-8H2/t10-,11-,12+,13-,14+,15-,16+,17+,18-,19-/m0/s1 Key: YYYCJNDALLBNEG-YQCIQBACSA-N
- SMILES: C1[C@@H]([C@@H]([C@H]([C@@H](O1)OC[C@@H]2[C@H]([C@@H]([C@H]([C@@H](O2)O[C@@H](C#N)C3=CC=CC=C3)O)O)O)O)O)O

Properties
Chemical formula	C_{19}H_{25}NO_{10}
Molar mass	427.406 g·mol^{−1}

Related compounds
Related compounds	amygdalin
- Except where otherwise noted, data are given for materials in their standard state (at 25 °C [77 °F], 100 kPa). verify (what is ?) Infobox references

Vicianin is a cyanogenic disaccharide.

The enzyme vicianin beta-glucosidase uses (R)-vicianin and H_{2}O to produce mandelonitrile and vicianose. It is found in seeds of Vicia angustifolia.
