= Cyanohydrin reaction =

Addition reaction of carbonyl compounds and cyanide

Named after	Friedrich Urech
Reaction type	Addition reaction

In organic chemistry, a cyanohydrin reaction is an organic reaction in which an aldehyde (−CH=O) or ketone (>C=O) reacts with a cyanide anion (N≡C^{−}) or a nitrile (−C≡N) to form a cyanohydrin (>C(OH)C≡N). For example:

$$\ce{R}{\color{red} \ce{CH=O}} + \ce{R}{\color{purple} \ce{C#N}} \longrightarrow \ce{R2}{\color{red} \ce{C(OH)}}{\color{purple} \ce{C#N}}$$

This nucleophilic addition is a reversible reaction but with aliphatic carbonyl compounds equilibrium is in favor of the reaction products. The cyanide source can be potassium cyanide (KCN), sodium cyanide (NaCN) or trimethylsilyl cyanide ((CH_{3})_{3}SiCN). With aromatic aldehydes such as benzaldehyde, the benzoin condensation is a competing reaction. The reaction is used in carbohydrate chemistry as a chain extension method for example that of D-xylose.

== Examples ==
Reaction of acetone with sodium cyanide to hydroxyacetonitrile

Reaction of benzoquinone with trimethylsilylcyanide, catalyst KCN is introduced as a 1:1 complex with the Crown ether 18-crown-6

== Reaction mechanism ==
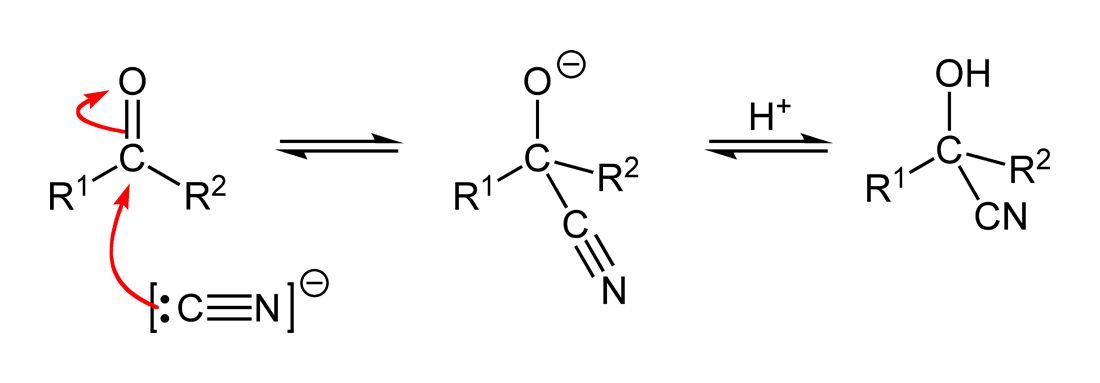
Mechanism of the cyanohydrin reaction

== Asymmetric synthesis ==
The asymmetric cyanohydrin reaction of benzaldehyde with trimethylsilylcyanide is made possible by employment of (R)-Binol at 1–10% catalyst loading. This ligand firsts reacts with a lithium alkoxy compound to form a lithium binaphtholate Complex.

Asymmetric reaction of benzaldehyde with (R)–Binol–lithium(i-propyloxy) gives (S)-acetonitrile with 98% ee

Asymmetric reaction of benzaldehyde with (R)–Binol–lithium(i-propyloxy) gives (S)-acetonitrile with 98% ee

The chemist Urech in 1872 was the first to synthesize cyanohydrins from ketones with alkali cyanides and acetic acid and therefore this reaction also goes by the name of Urech cyanohydrin method.
