= Benzyl gentiobioside =

Names
- IUPAC name Benzyl β-d-gluco-hexopyranosyl-(1→6)-β-d-gluco-hexopyranoside
- Other names Phenylmethyl 6-O-β-D-glucopyranosyl-β-D-glucopyranoside

Identifiers
CAS Number	56775-64-5
3D model (JSmol)	Interactive image
ChemSpider	4955771
PubChem CID	6453389
CompTox Dashboard (EPA)	DTXSID40904199
- InChI: InChI=1S/C19H28O11/c20-6-10-12(21)14(23)16(25)19(29-10)28-8-11-13(22)15(24)17(26)18(30-11)27-7-9-4-2-1-3-5-9/h1-5,10-26H,6-8H2/t10-,11-,12-,13-,14+,15+,16-,17-,18-,19-/m1/s1 Key: LLEMMFPELBNINR-SKYGPZSASA-N
- SMILES: C1=CC=C(C=C1)CO[C@H]2[C@@H]([C@H]([C@@H]([C@H](O2)CO[C@H]3[C@@H]([C@H]([C@@H]([C@H](O3)CO)O)O)O)O)O)O

Properties
Chemical formula	C_{19}H_{28}O_{11}
Molar mass	432.422 g·mol^{−1}
- Except where otherwise noted, data are given for materials in their standard state (at 25 °C [77 °F], 100 kPa). Infobox references

Benzyl gentiobioside is a decyanogenated form of amygdalin. Benzyl gentiobioside occurs in Prunus persica seeds.
