= Vicianin beta-glucosidase =

Class of enzymes

vicianin β-glucosidase

Identifiers
- EC no.: 3.2.1.119
- CAS no.: 91608-93-4

Databases
- BRENDA: enzyme data
- ExPASy: NiceZyme view
- KEGG: enzyme entry
- MetaCyc: metabolic pathway
- Rhea: reactions
- PDB structures: RCSB PDB PDBe PDBsum
- Gene Ontology: AmiGO / QuickGO
Search
- PMC: articles
- PubMed: articles
- NCBI: proteins

The enzyme vicianin β-glucosidase (EC 3.2.1.119) characterised from Prunus serotina catalyzes the following chemical reaction:

vicianin
H_{2}O
(+)-mandelonitrile
+
vicianose

The reaction hydrolyses the cyanogenic glycoside, vicianin, to (+)-mandelonitrile and vicianose. The enzyme has also been found in Davallia trichomanoides. A similar enzyme has been found in Vicia angustifolia.

The enzyme is a hydrolase, specifically a glycosidase that hydrolyses O- and S-glycosyl compounds. The systematic name is (R)-vicianin β-D-glucohydrolase. It is also called vicianin hydrolase.
