= Ralph Moss =

Ralph Moss may refer to:

- Ralph W. Moss (writer) (Ralph Walter Moss, born 1943), writer on alternative cancer treatments
- Ralph W. Moss (politician) (Ralph Wilbur Moss, 1862–1919), U.S. Representative from Indiana
