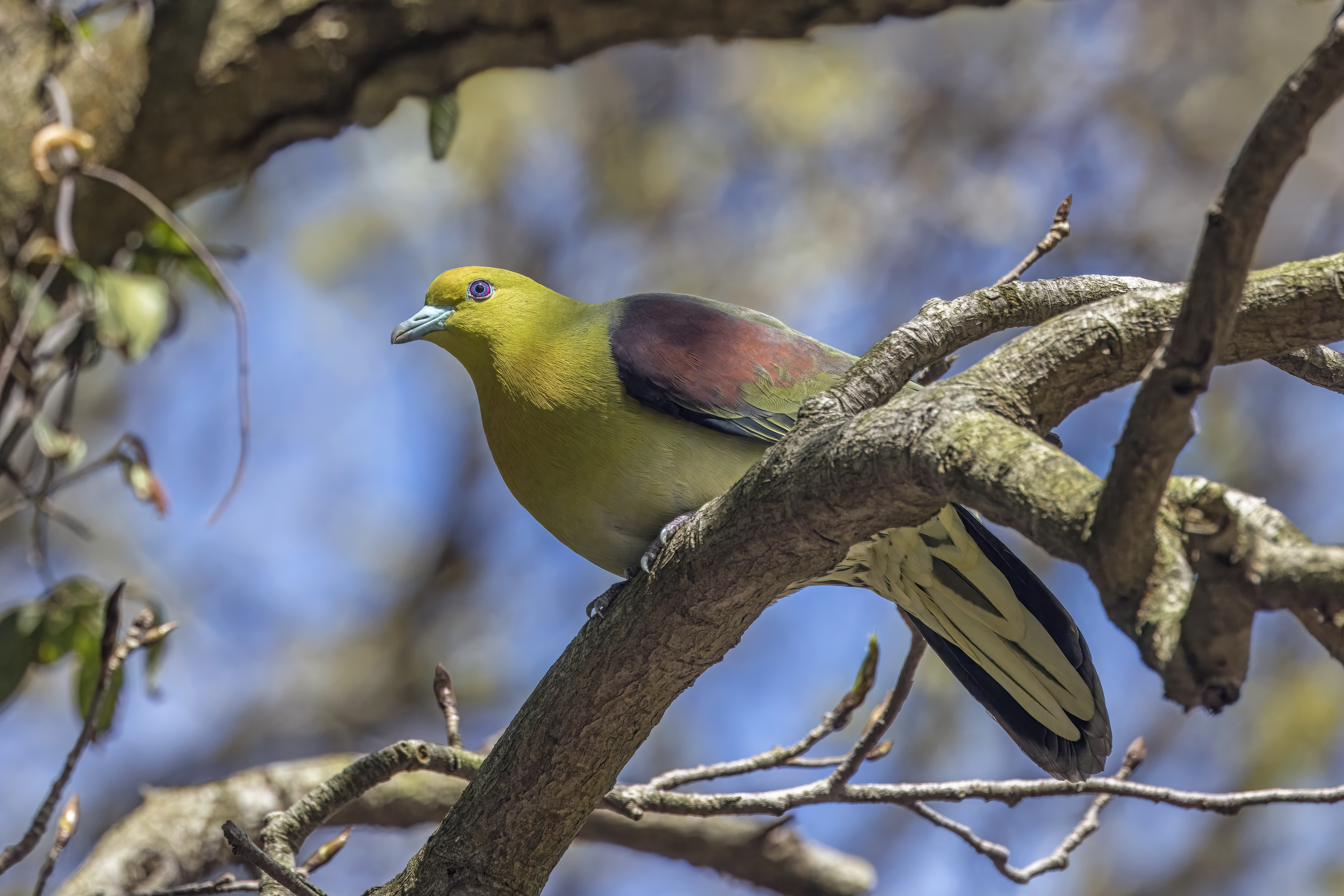
- In Taiwan

Conservation status
- Least Concern (IUCN 3.1)

Scientific classification
- Kingdom: Animalia
- Phylum: Chordata
- Class: Aves
- Order: Columbiformes
- Family: Columbidae
- Genus: Treron
- Species: T. sieboldii

Binomial name
- Treron sieboldii (Temminck, 1835)

Synonyms
- Columba sieboldii Temminck, 1835; Sphenurus sieboldii (Temminck, 1835)

= White-bellied green pigeon =

Species of bird

The white-bellied green pigeon (Treron sieboldii), also known as Siebold's green pigeon and Japanese green pigeon, is a species of bird in the family Columbidae. It is found in East, and Southeast Asia. Its natural habitat is temperate forests and woodlands. Its population has increased significantly since 2000. It is one of the few green pigeons that migrates.

== Etymology ==
The species epithet is named after Philipp Franz von Siebold, a German naturalist and traveler.

== Distribution and habitat ==
White-bellied green pigeons are found in Japan, Taiwan, eastern and southern China, and northern Southeast Asia. In Japan, their population is found mainly in Hokkaido and the Ryukyu Islands. They also occur in Taiwan and eastern and southern China, and in northern Thailand, Laos and Vietnam.

The species is generally sedentary, but birds in Hokkaido are wholly migratory and only present there from May to September, and the populations in the rest of Japan also undertake some poorly understood migration.

This pigeon is a forest dweller. It settles in deciduous and mixed forests, and prefers primary forests. In Japan, it exists in the forests of lowlands and in mountain forests, up to 1,400 m (4,600 ft).

== Description ==
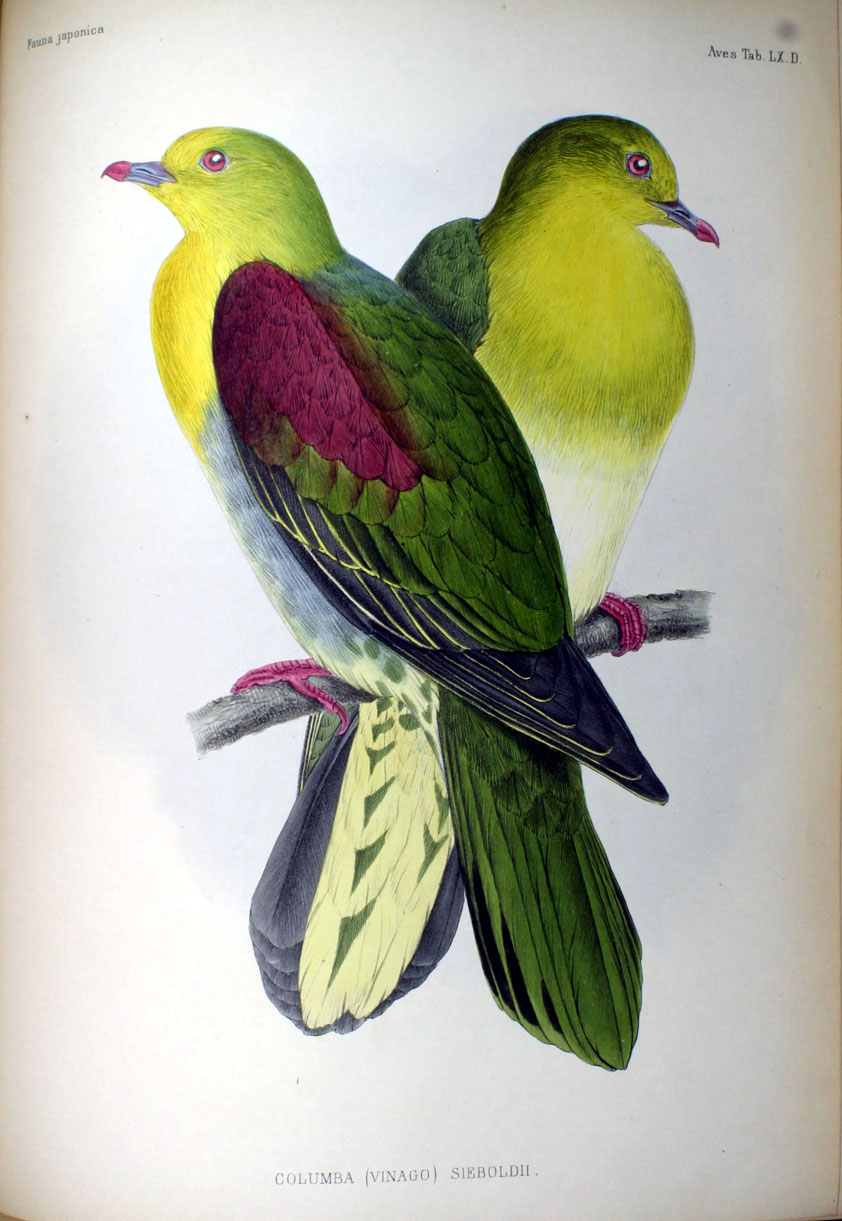
White-bellied green pigeon, illustration

The white-bellied green pigeon is a medium-sized, compactly built pigeon 33–36 centimetres (13–14 in) long. The males have a bright green head and chest, olive-coloured wings, throat and neck, a patch of maroon on the shoulders, and a white belly, undertail and legs, as the name suggests. The tail is short, 103–122 mm long, dark green with blackish sides. Its beak is 17–21 mm long, light bluish with a grey tip. The eye rings are vivid blue, the iris pink to violet. Their feet are red to violet.

The females are similar to the males, but are not as colourful. They do not have the maroon patches on their shoulders, and their breast is a frosted green.

== Taxonomy ==
The white-bellied green pigeon is a member of the family Columbidae, in the subfamily Raphinae. This includes the tribe Treronini, and with it the genus Treron. It is closely related to the Ryukyu green pigeon.

=== Subspecies ===
Four subspecies are accepted:

- Treron sieboldii sieboldii (Temminck, CJ, 1835) – eastern China and Japan
- Treron sieboldii fopingensis Cheng T; Tan Y; Sung S, 1973 – lowlands and foothills of central China (eastern Sichuan and southern Shaanxi)
- Treron sieboldii sororius (Swinhoe, R, 1866) – Taiwan
- Treron sieboldii murielae (Delacour, JT, 1927) – far southwestern China to northern Thailand, central Vietnam, and Hainan

== Behaviour ==
The pigeon is known for its unusual habit of drinking saltwater. Scientists believe that this can help with the pigeon's digestion of acidic berries. A well-known location where the pigeons do this in Japan is Terugasaki in Ōiso in Kanagawa Prefecture. White-bellied green pigeons live in pairs or in groups of up to ten individuals. They are also known to be shy and secretive.

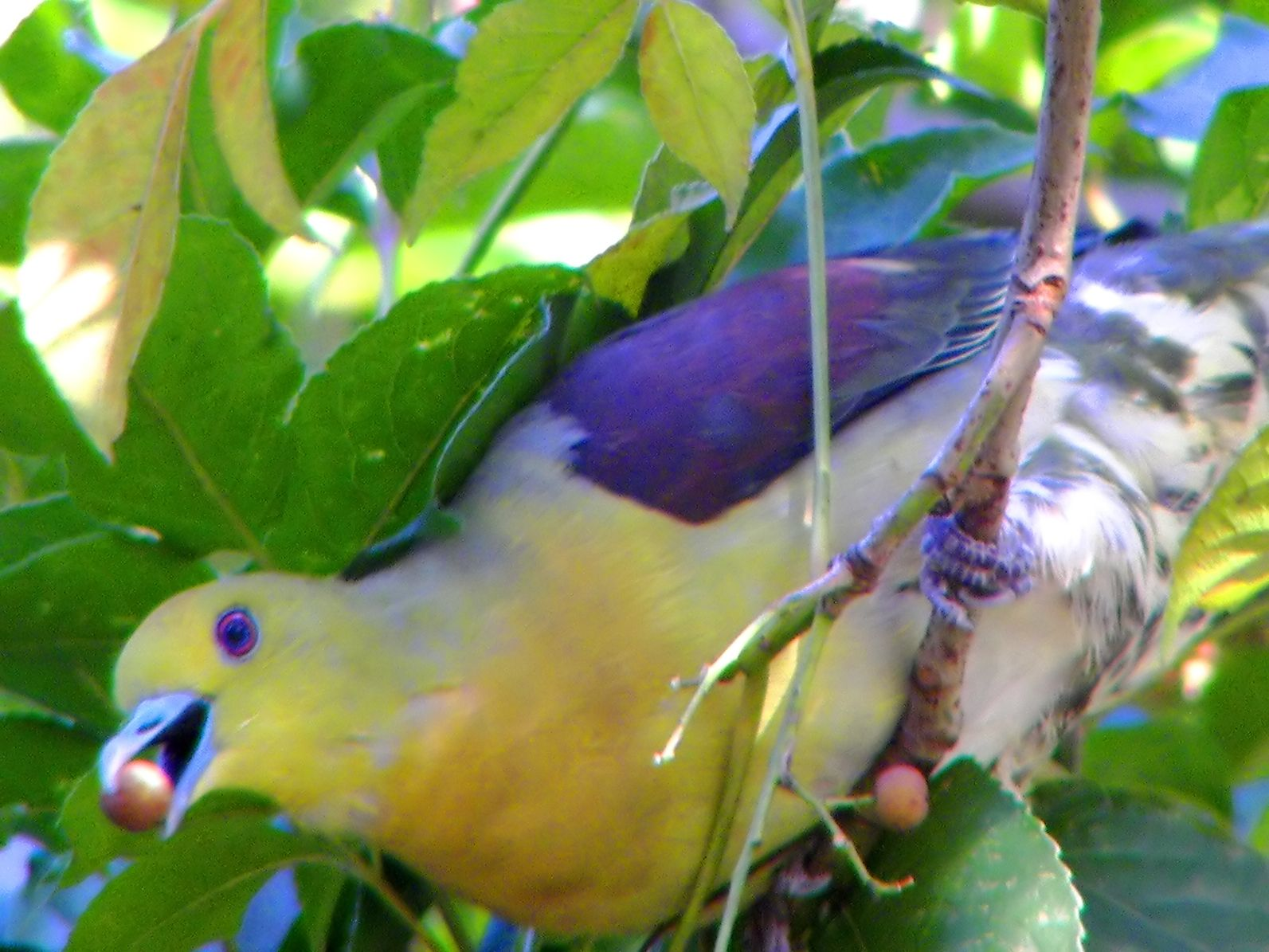
White-bellied green pigeon eating a cherry

White-bellied green pigeons exclusively eat fruit, like cherries of the Korean cherry, grapes of the crimson glory vine, and dogwood berries. In winter, they feed on acorns. They mostly pick the fruit from branches. Sometimes they come to the ground to drink water. They will form flocks to gather at coastal drinking sites; in Hokkaido, flocks of up to two hundred individuals, and in Honshu flocks of up to 440 individuals, have been observed. This saltwater-drinking behaviour is only seen in summer, and may be due to the summer diet lacking minerals.

Their nest is typical of pigeons built in trees as a loose platform of twigs. The females lay two eggs.
