= C8H11NO3 =

The molecular formula C_{8}H_{11}NO_{3} (molar mass: 169.17 g/mol, exact mass: 169.073893 u) may refer to:

- Ammonium mandelate
- Norepinephrine, or noradrenaline
- Oxidopamine, a dopamine derivative
- Pyridoxine
