= Second opinion (disambiguation) =

A second opinion is a consultation with an additional physician for an alternative point of view.

Second opinion may also refer to:

- Second Opinion (TV series), an American medical program
- "Second Opinion" (Law & Order), an episode of Law & Order
- "Second Opinion" (Medium), an episode of Medium
- "Second Opinion" (The Sopranos), an episode of The Sopranos
- Trauma Center: Second Opinion, a video game
- Second Opinion, an album by Marvin Welch & Farrar
- Second Opinion, 2014 documentary film by Eric Merola about cancer theories of writer Ralph W. Moss
- Second Opinion (2018 film), a film directed by Caroline Labrèche
