= Vicianose =

Names
- IUPAC names α-l-Arabinopyranosyl-(1→6)-β-d-glucopyranose; 6-O-α-l-Arabinopyranosyl-d-glucopyranose
- Other names 6-O-α-L-arabinopyranosyl-D-glucopyranose

Identifiers
CAS Number	14116-69-9
3D model (JSmol)	Interactive image
ChEBI	CHEBI:16177
ChemSpider	388630
KEGG	C01625
PubChem CID	439537
UNII	UC25IYC1RX
CompTox Dashboard (EPA)	DTXSID40331421
- InChI: InChI=1S/C11H20O10/c12-3-1-19-11(9(17)5(3)13)20-2-4-6(14)7(15)8(16)10(18)21-4/h3-18H,1-2H2/t3-,4+,5-,6+,7-,8+,9+,10?,11-/m0/s1 Key: QYNRIDLOTGRNML-ULAALWPKSA-N
- SMILES: C1[C@@H]([C@@H]([C@H]([C@@H](O1)OC[C@@H]2[C@H]([C@@H]([C@H](C(O2)O)O)O)O)O)O)O

Properties
Chemical formula	C_{11}H_{20}O_{10}
Molar mass	312.271 g·mol^{−1}
- Except where otherwise noted, data are given for materials in their standard state (at 25 °C [77 °F], 100 kPa). Infobox references

Vicianose is a disaccharide.

Vicianin is a cyanogenic glycoside containing vicianose. The enzyme vicianin beta-glucosidase uses (R)-vicianin and water to produce mandelonitrile and vicianose.

The fruits of Viburnum dentatum appear blue. One of the major pigments is cyanidin 3-vicianoside, but the total mixture is very complex.
