= C14H17NO6 =

The molecular formula C_{14}H_{17}NO_{6} (molar mass: 295.29 g/mol) may refer to:

- Indican
- Prunasin, a cyanogenic glucoside
- Sambunigrin, a cyanogenic glucoside
