= Ammonium mandelate =

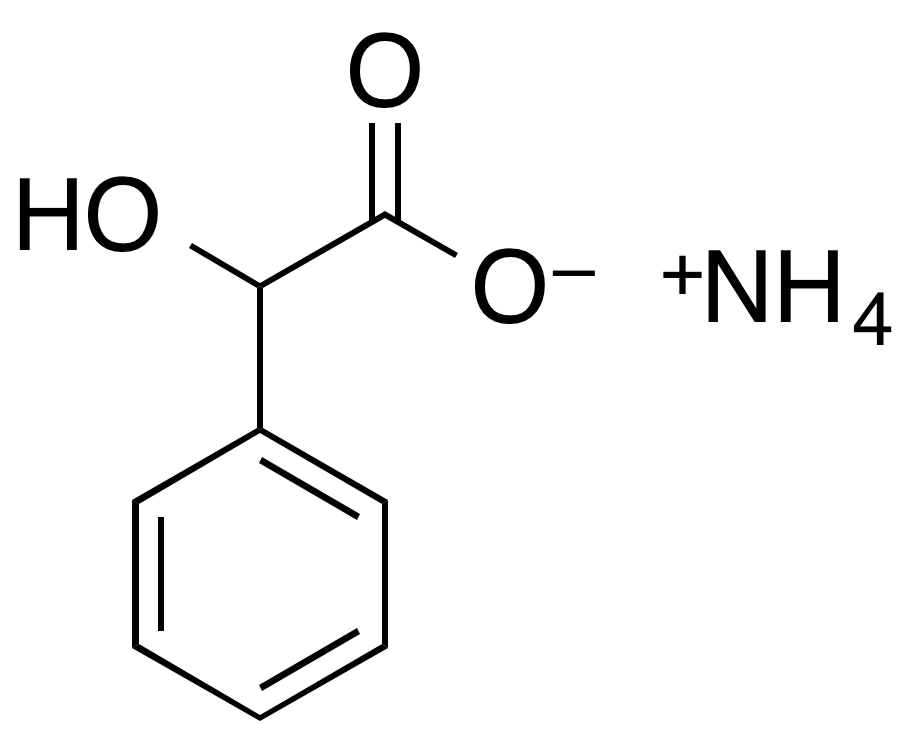

Names
- IUPAC name azane;2-hydroxy-2-phenylacetic acid

Identifiers
CAS Number	530-31-4
3D model (JSmol)	Interactive image
ChemSpider	10279
ECHA InfoCard	100.007.706
EC Number	208-475-8
PubChem CID	10732
UNII	6PGE18556E
CompTox Dashboard (EPA)	DTXSID30967475
- InChI: InChI=1S/C8H8O3.H3N/c9-7(8(10)11)6-4-2-1-3-5-6;/h1-5,7,9H,(H,10,11);1H3 Key: BDEXTKUJIZCFST-UHFFFAOYSA-N
- SMILES: C(C(O)=O)(O)C1=CC=CC=C1.N

Properties
Chemical formula	C_{8}H_{11}NO_{3}
Molar mass	169.180 g·mol^{−1}
Appearance	Crystalline colorless powder
Melting point	144 °C
Boiling point	321.8 °C
Solubility in water	very soluble

Hazards
Flash point	162.6 °C
- Except where otherwise noted, data are given for materials in their standard state (at 25 °C [77 °F], 100 kPa). Infobox references

Ammonium mandelate is a chemical compound with the chemical formula C_{8}H_{11}NO_{3}.This is an organic ammonium salt of mandelic acid.

== Synthesis ==
The compound can be prepared by reacting mandelic acid and ammonia or excess of strong ammonia water.

== Physical properties ==
The compound forms odorless crystalline colorless powder. Very soluble in water, sparingly soluble in alcohol.

== Uses ==
The compound is used as a urinary antiseptic.
