= Mandelonitrile =

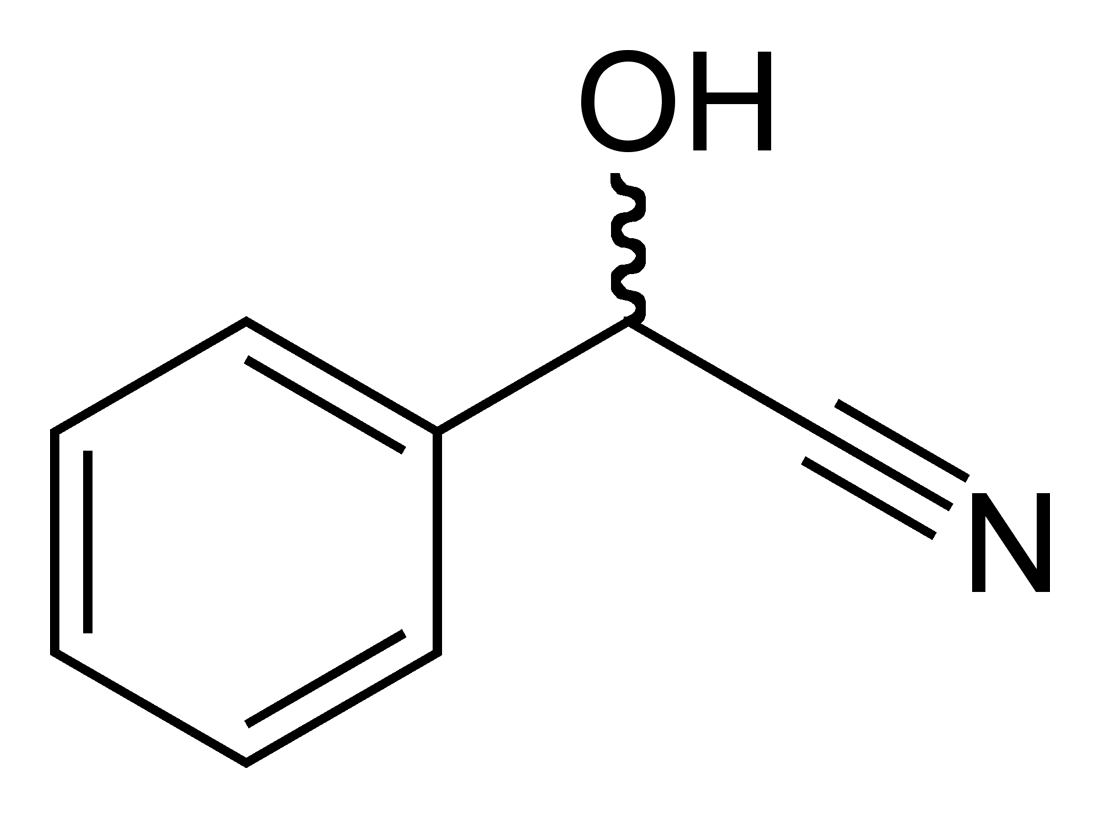
- Racemic mandelonitrile (ambiguous chirality)

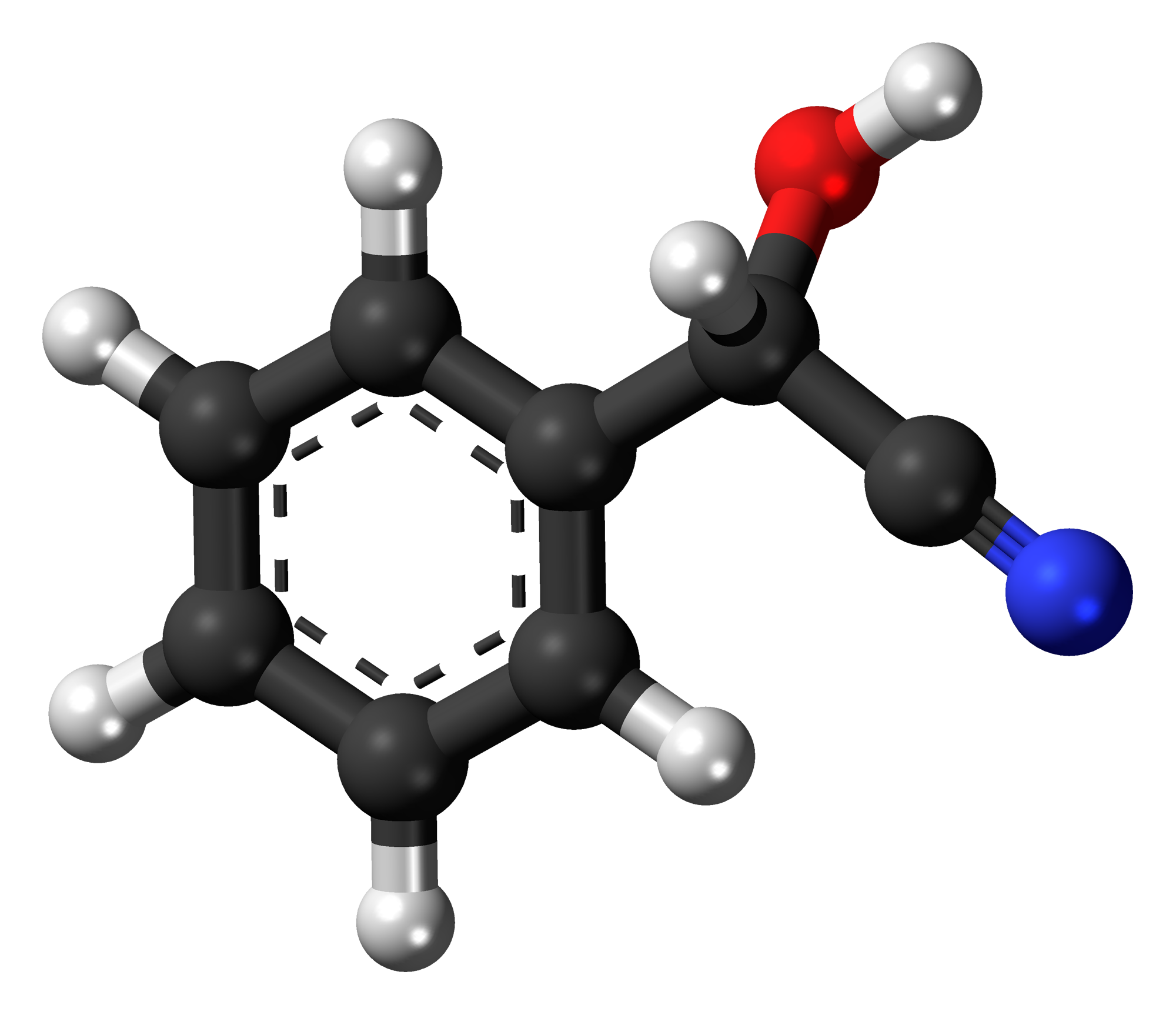
- (S)-Mandelonitrile

Names
- IUPAC name 2-Hydroxy-2-phenylacetonitrile
- Other names α-Hydroxybenzeneacetonitrile

Identifiers
CAS Number	532-28-5
3D model (JSmol)	Interactive image
Beilstein Reference	2207122
ChEBI	CHEBI:16910
ChEMBL	ChEMBL1393845
ChemSpider	10304
ECHA InfoCard	100.007.758
EC Number	208-532-7
Gmelin Reference	1684586
KEGG	C00561
PubChem CID	10758
UNII	584322E08A
UN number	2810
CompTox Dashboard (EPA)	DTXSID2025422
- InChI: InChI=1S/C8H7NO/c9-6-8(10)7-4-2-1-3-5-7/h1-5,8,10H Key: NNICRUQPODTGRU-UHFFFAOYSA-N; InChI=1/C8H7NO/c9-6-8(10)7-4-2-1-3-5-7/h1-5,8,10H Key: NNICRUQPODTGRU-UHFFFAOYAG
- SMILES: N#CC(O)c1ccccc1

Properties
Chemical formula	C_{8}H_{7}NO
Molar mass	133.150 g·mol^{−1}
Density	1.117 g/mL
Melting point	22 °C (72 °F; 295 K) (R/S)
Boiling point	282.70 °C (540.86 °F; 555.85 K) Decomposes

Hazards
- Occupational safety and health (OHS/OSH)
Main hazards	toxic
Flash point	113 °C (235 °F; 386 K)

Related compounds
Related compounds	mandelic acid, phenylacetonitrile
- Except where otherwise noted, data are given for materials in their standard state (at 25 °C [77 °F], 100 kPa). verify (what is ?) Infobox references

In organic chemistry, mandelonitrile is the nitrile of mandelic acid, or the cyanohydrin derivative of benzaldehyde. Small amounts of mandelonitrile occur in the pits of some fruits.

== Occurrence ==
Mandelonitrile is the aglycone part of the cyanogenic glycosides prunasin and amygdalin. Prunasin can be hydrolyzed by the enzyme prunase into glucose and mandelonitrile (for example, when an appleseed is digested in a ruminant's stomach).

The naturally occurring (R)-(+) enantiomer finds use as an intermediate in the preparation of optically active α-hydroxy carboxylic acids, α-hydroxy aldehydes, α-hydroxy ketones, and 2-amino alcohols.

Mandelonitrile can break down into cyanide and benzaldehyde, a reaction that can be catalyzed by the enzyme mandelonitrile lyase.

== Preparation ==
Racemic mandelonitrile may be prepared similar to many other cyanohydrins. In a one pot reaction, benzaldehyde is reacted with sodium bisulfite to give the corresponding adduct, which further reacts with aqueous sodium cyanide to give the racemic product:

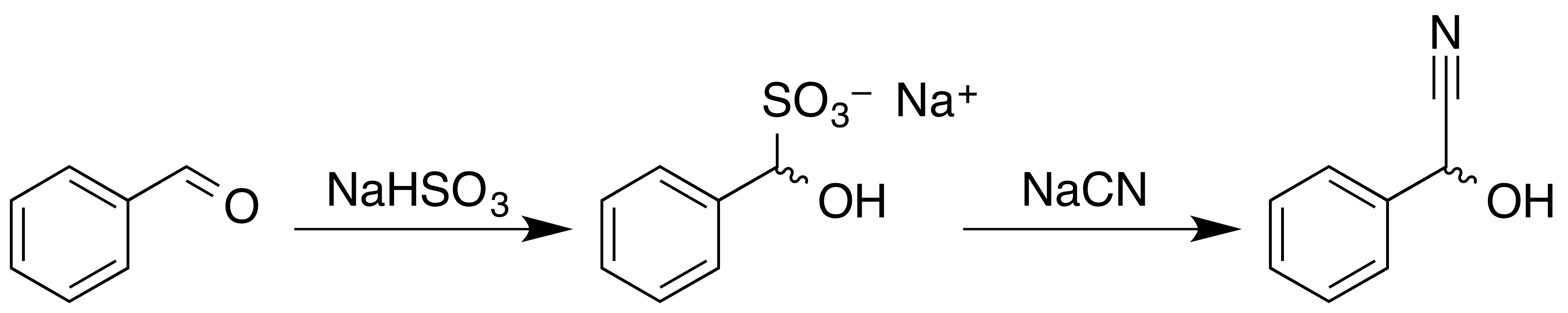
