= Aliphatic (R)-hydroxynitrile lyase =

Identifiers
- EC no.: 4.1.2.46

Databases
- IntEnz: IntEnz view
- BRENDA: BRENDA entry
- ExPASy: NiceZyme view
- KEGG: KEGG entry
- MetaCyc: metabolic pathway
- PRIAM: profile
- PDB structures: RCSB PDB PDBe PDBsum
Search
- PMC: articles
- PubMed: articles
- NCBI: proteins

Aliphatic (R)-hydroxynitrile lyase (EC 4.1.2.46, (R)-HNL, (R)-oxynitrilase, (R)-hydroxynitrile lyase, LuHNL) is an enzyme with systematic name (2R)-2-hydroxy-2-methylbutanenitrile butan-2-one-lyase (cyanide forming). This enzyme catalyses the following chemical reaction:

(2R)-2-hydroxy-2-methylbutanenitrile $\rightleftharpoons$ cyanide + butan-2-one

The enzyme contains Zn^{2+}.
