= Ralph W. Moss (writer) =

American writer (born 1943)

Ralph Walter Moss
- Born: May 6, 1943 (age 83); Brooklyn, New York
- Occupation: Science writer
- Writing career
- Language: English
- Subjects: Alternative medicine and alternative cancer treatments
- Website: www.mossreports.com

Ralph Walter Moss (born May 6, 1943) is an American author whose writings promote complementary and alternative cancer treatments. In 1974, he earned a PhD in Classics from Stanford University. Moss served as a science writer at Memorial Sloan-Kettering Cancer Center in the 1970s. He was fired in 1977 by Sloan-Kettering after publicly accusing the institution of suppressing information on laetrile, an alternative cancer treatment. He has subsequently served on the advisory board of the Office of Alternative Medicine, and he markets Moss Reports covering various forms of alternative medicine.

His 1980 book The Cancer Industry was negatively reviewed by Quackwatch, who noted that "the book is dangerous because it may induce desperate cancer patients to abandon sound, scientifically based medical care for a worthless 'alternative.'"

Moss's 1988 book Free Radical: Albert Szent-Györgyi and The Battle Over Vitamin C (with a preface by Studs Terkel) is a biography of the Nobel Laureate Albert Szent-Györgyi. The biography was reviewed by Ed Regis for The New York Times.
