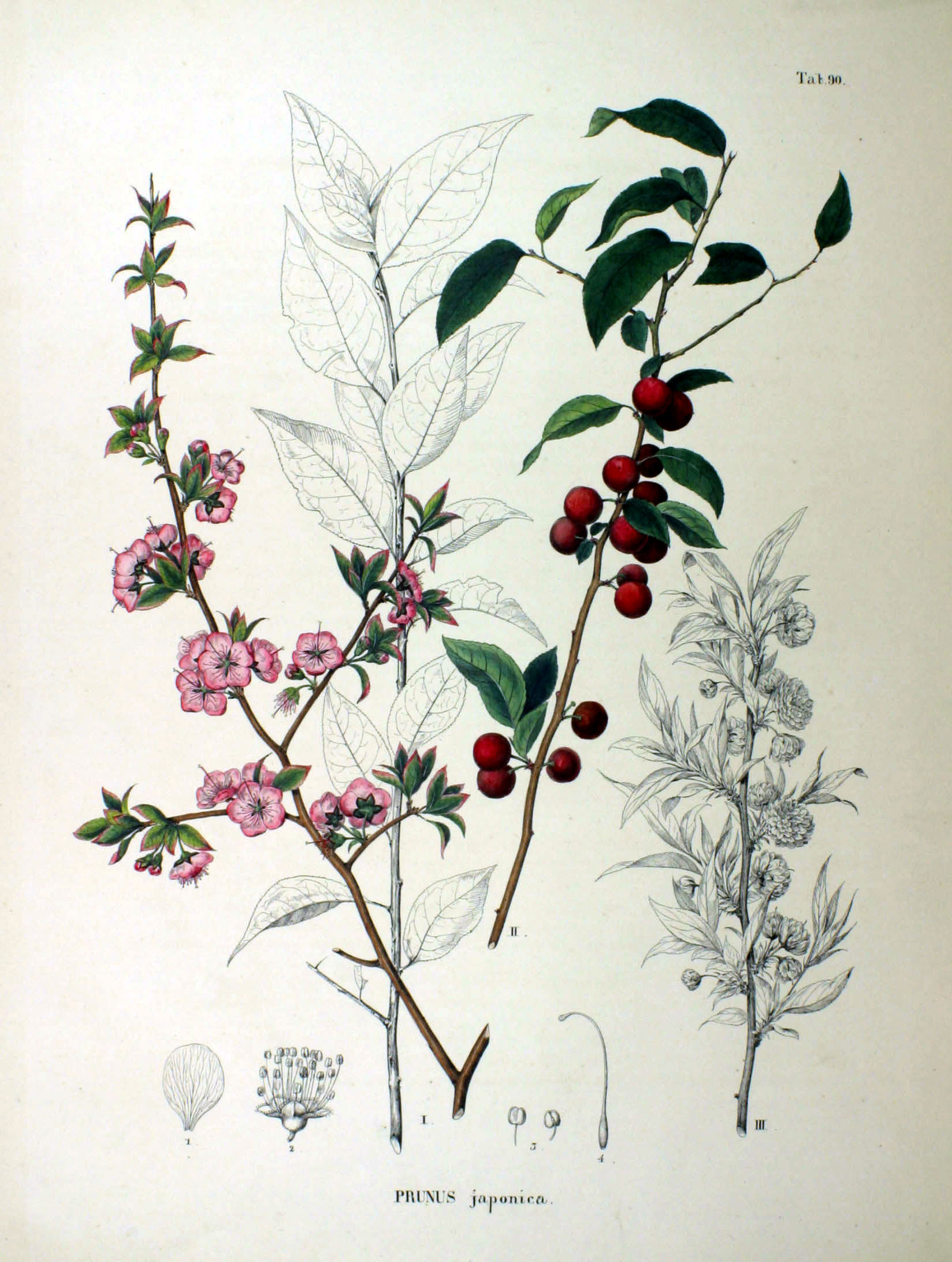
- Prunus japonica

Scientific classification
- Kingdom: Plantae
- Clade: Embryophytes
- Clade: Tracheophytes
- Clade: Spermatophytes
- Clade: Angiosperms
- Clade: Eudicots
- Clade: Rosids
- Order: Rosales
- Family: Rosaceae
- Genus: Prunus
- Subgenus: Prunus subg. Prunus
- Section: Prunus sect. Microcerasus
- Species: P. japonica

Binomial name
- Prunus japonica Thunb.

Synonyms
- Prunus consociiflora Schneider; Prunus ishidoyana Nakai

= Prunus japonica =

Species of tree

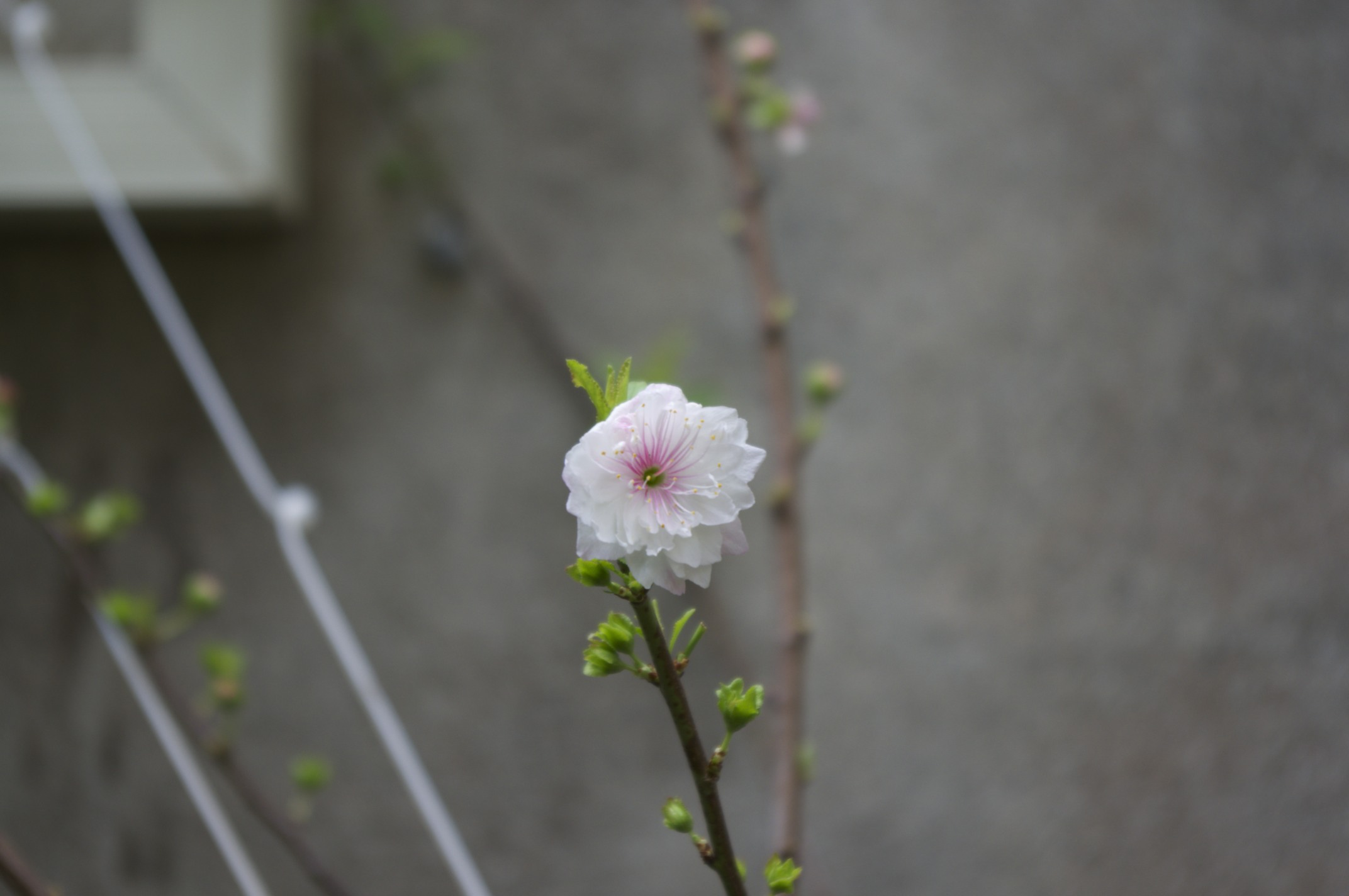
A blossom

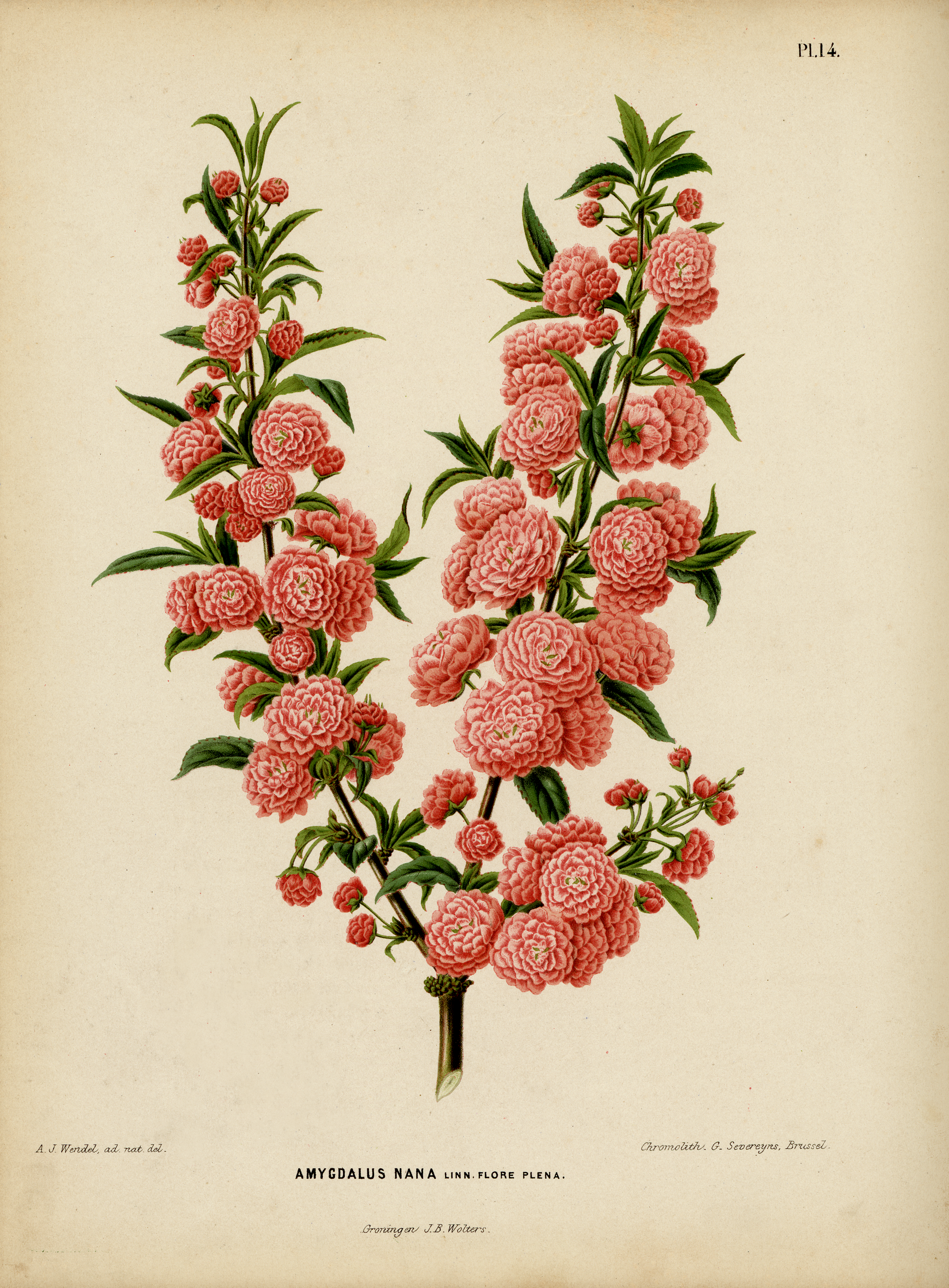
Prunus japonica by A.J. Wendel, 1868

Prunus japonica (also Cerasus japonica), also called Japanese bush cherry, Oriental bush cherry, or Korean bush cherry is a shrub species in the genus Prunus that is widely cultivated for ornamental use. Its native range extends from Central China through to the Korean peninsula.

== Description ==
The shrub reaches 1.5 m by 1.5 m. Its flowers are hermaphrodite and are pollinated by insects. The plant blossoms in May. Its fruit reaches about 14 mm and has an agreeably sweet flavor, therefore it is used in making pies, but its taste is quite sour, reminiscent of that of sour cherry.

Each fruit has one seed. The plant usually grows from seed but can also be propagated through cutting or layering.

== Habitat ==
The plant thrives on well-drained and moist loamy soil and prefers little shade or no shade at all. The plant prefers some lime in the soil but not too much. It is mostly found at woodlands or sunny places.

== Other uses ==
The leaves of this plant procure a green dye, while the fruit procures a greenish to grayish dye.

== Varieties ==
There are several varieties:

- P. japonica eujaponica
- P. japonica gracillima
- P. kerii
- P. japonica nakaii, originated from Manchuria, which gives bigger plums (up to 50 mm in diameter).

== See also ==
- Cherry Blossom
