= Mandelic acid =

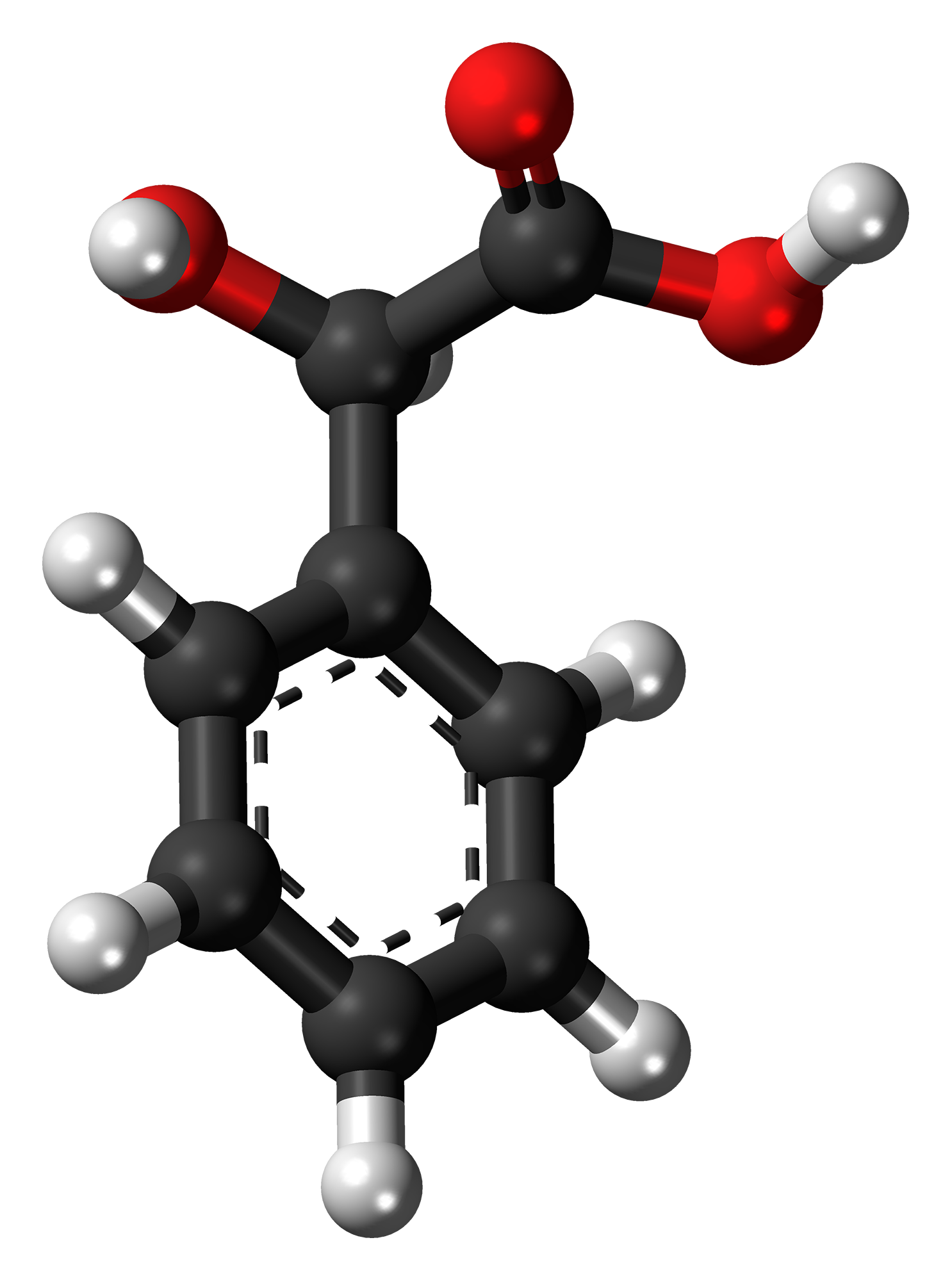

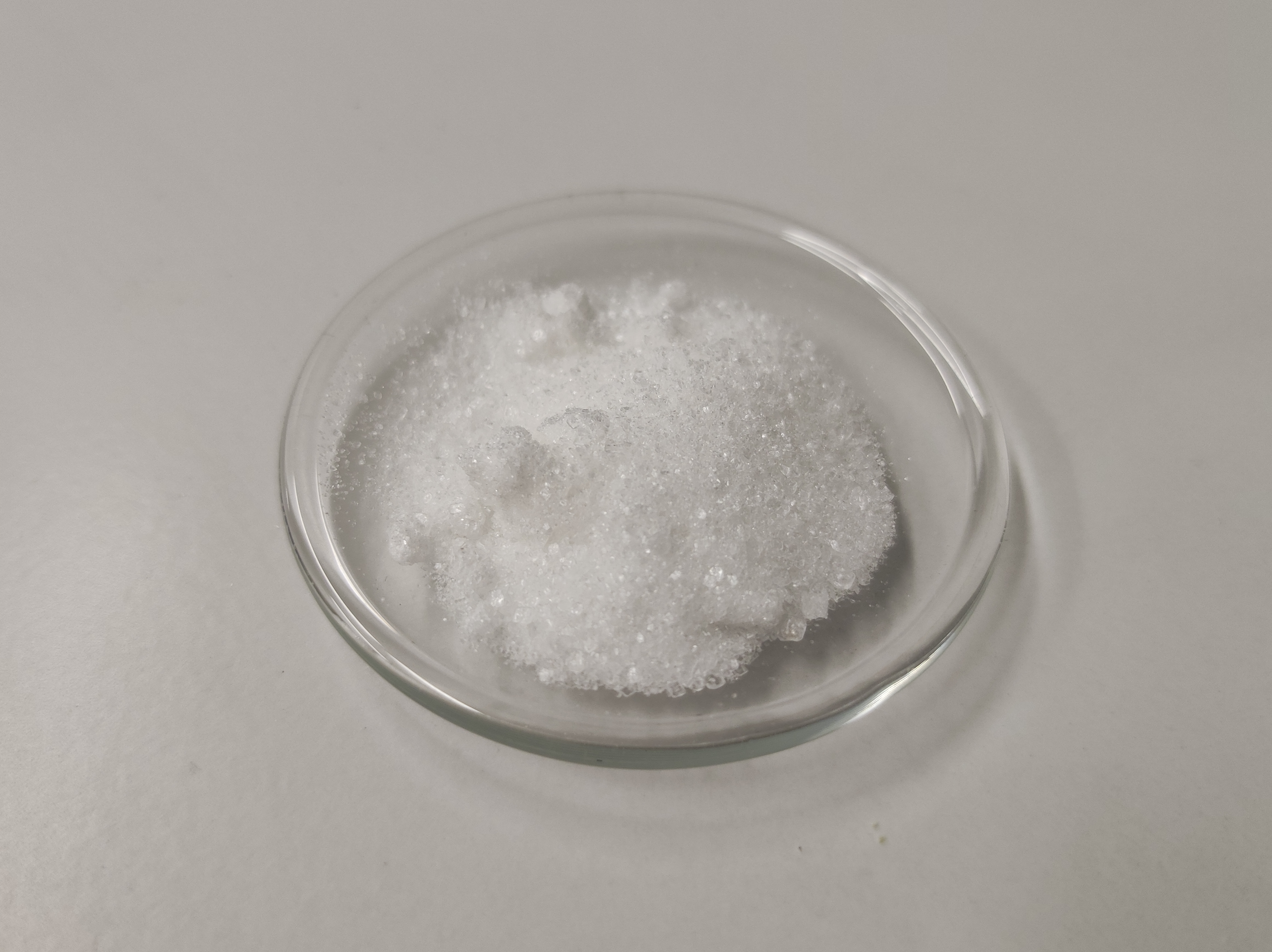

Names
- Preferred IUPAC name Hydroxy(phenyl)acetic acid
- Other names: Amygdalic acid; Amygdalinic acid; Benzoglycolic acid; α-Hydroxy-α-toluic acid; α-Hydroxyphenylacetic acid; 2-Hydroxy-2-phenylacetic acid; Paramandelic acid; Phenylglycolic acid; Phenylglycollic acid; Phenylglyconic acid; α-Phenylhydroxyacetic acid; Phenylhydroxyacetic acid

Identifiers
CAS Number	90-64-2; (R): 611-71-2; (S): 17199-29-0
3D model (JSmol)	Interactive image
Beilstein Reference	510011
ChEBI	CHEBI:35825
ChEMBL	ChEMBL1609
ChemSpider	1253
DrugBank	DB13218; (R): DB02280; (S): DB03357
ECHA InfoCard	100.001.825
EC Number	202-007-6
Gmelin Reference	218213
KEGG	(R): C01983; (S): C01984
PubChem CID	1292
RTECS number	OO6300000
UNII	NH496X0UJX; (R): PPL7YW1M9W; (S): L0UMW58G3T
CompTox Dashboard (EPA)	DTXSID6023234
- InChI: InChI=1S/C8H8O3/c9-7(8(10)11)6-4-2-1-3-5-6/h1-5,7,9H,(H,10,11) Key: IWYDHOAUDWTVEP-UHFFFAOYSA-N; InChI=1/C8H8O3/c9-7(8(10)11)6-4-2-1-3-5-6/h1-5,7,9H,(H,10,11) Key: IWYDHOAUDWTVEP-UHFFFAOYAD
- SMILES: O=C(O)C(O)c1ccccc1

Properties
Chemical formula	C_{8}H_{8}O_{3}
Molar mass	152.149 g·mol^{−1}
Appearance	White crystalline powder
Density	1.30 g/cm^{3}
Melting point	119 °C (246 °F; 392 K) optically pure: 132 to 135 °C (270 to 275 °F; 405 to 408 K)
Boiling point	321.8 °C (611.2 °F; 595.0 K)
Solubility in water	15.87 g/100 mL
Solubility	soluble in diethyl ether, ethanol, isopropanol
Acidity (pK_{a})	3.41
Refractive index (n_{D})	1.5204

Thermochemistry
Std enthalpy of formation (Δ_{f}H^{⦵}_{298})	0.1761 kJ/g

Pharmacology
ATC code	B05CA06 (WHO) J01XX06 (WHO)

Hazards
Flash point	162.6 °C (324.7 °F; 435.8 K)

Related compounds
Related compounds	mandelonitrile, phenylacetic acid, vanillylmandelic acid
- Except where otherwise noted, data are given for materials in their standard state (at 25 °C [77 °F], 100 kPa). verify (what is ?) Infobox references

Mandelic acid is an aromatic alpha hydroxy acid (AHA) with the molecular formula C_{6}H_{5}CH(OH)CO_{2}H. It is a white crystalline solid that is soluble in water and polar organic solvents. Its principal use in organic synthesis is as a useful precursor to various drugs.

== Properties ==
At room temperature, mandelic acid is a white or colorless solid with a faint odor. It is highly soluble in diethyl ether but less so in water and ethanol. It is insoluble in petroleum ether.

The molecule is chiral. The racemic mixture is known as paramandelic acid.

== Isolation, synthesis, occurrence ==
Mandelic acid was discovered in 1831 by the German pharmacist Ferdinand Ludwig Winckler (1801–1868) while heating amygdalin, an extract of bitter almonds, with diluted hydrochloric acid. The name is derived from the German "Mandel" for "almond".

Mandelic acid is usually prepared by the acid-catalysed hydrolysis of mandelonitrile, which is the cyanohydrin of benzaldehyde and can be synthesized in various ways:

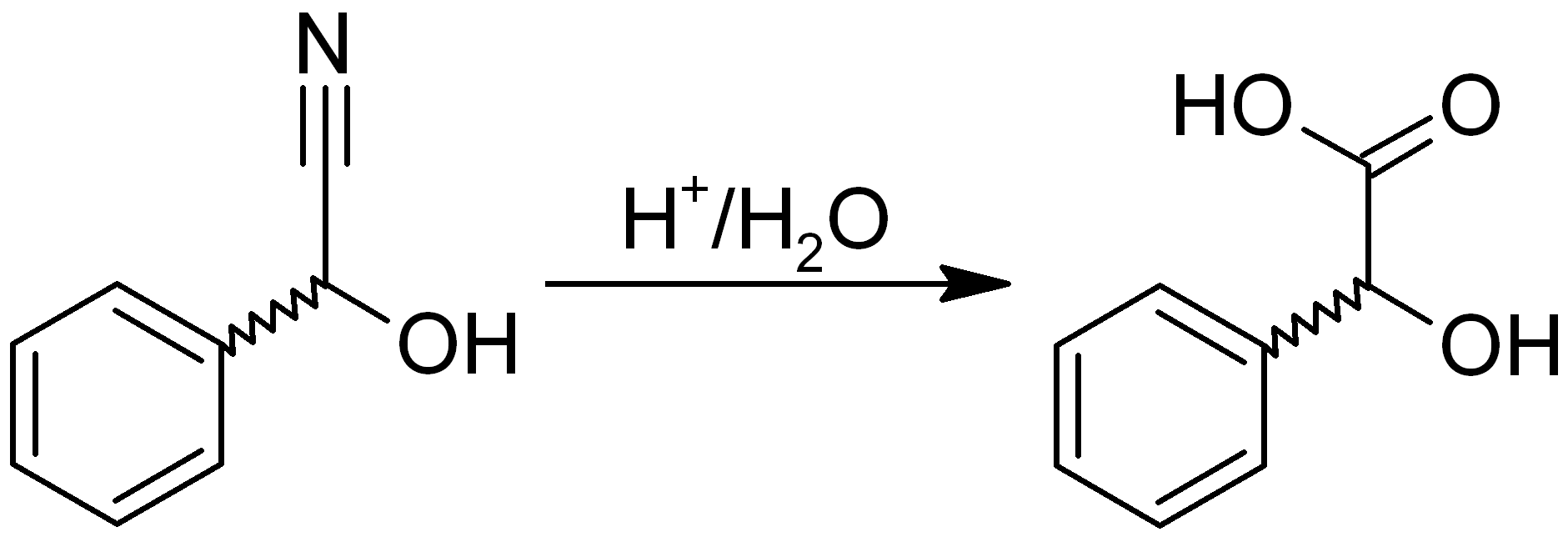

Alternatively, it can be prepared by a substitution reaction from bromophenylacetic acid, as well as by hydrolysis routes starting from various α,α-dihaloacetophenones. It also arises by an isomerization reaction upon heating phenylglyoxal with various alkalis.

=== Biosynthesis ===
Mandelic acid is a substrate or product of several biochemical processes called the mandelate pathway. Mandelate racemase interconverts the two enantiomers via a pathway that involves cleavage of the alpha-CH bond. Mandelate dehydrogenase is yet another enzyme on this pathway. Mandelate also arises from trans-cinnamate via phenylacetic acid, which is hydroxylated. Phenylpyruvic acid is another precursor to mandelic acid.

Derivatives of mandelic acid are formed as a result of metabolism of adrenaline and noradrenaline by monoamine oxidase and catechol-O-methyl transferase. The biotechnological production of 4-hydroxy-mandelic acid and mandelic acid on the basis of glucose was demonstrated with a genetically modified yeast Saccharomyces cerevisiae, in which the hydroxymandelate synthase naturally occurring in the bacterium Amycolatopsis was incorporated into a wild-type strain of yeast, partially altered by the exchange of a gene sequence and expressed.

It also arises from the biodegradation of styrene and ethylbenzene, as detected in urine.

== Uses ==
=== Cosmetics ===
Mandelic acid can be a component of chemical face peels analogous to other alpha hydroxy acids. Mandelic acid is one of the most common chemical components of the "superficial peel" class, which destroy all or part of the epidermis while remaining safe to use on all Fitzpatrick skin types. The American Academy of Dermatology says there is insufficient evidence to recommend chemical peels (including those with mandelic acid) as a treatment for acne vulgaris. While noting it was widely used in cosmetic products, known to be effective, and frequently prescribed for acne, mandelic acid was among the ingredients not recommended for acne in a 2025 Journal of the American Academy of Dermatology literature review's expert panel, because it is rarely covered by insurance and more costly than treatments with similar effects such as vitamin A derivatives.

=== Pharmaceuticals ===
Mandelic acid is widely used for pharmaceuticals as a precursor to various drugs.

Homatropine are esters of mandelic acid. Homatropine dilates eyes for eye exams and wears off quickly. This effect was discovered by chemist Alfred Ladenburg in 1880 and was preferred because the previous mixture caused blurry vision for days. Mandelic acid replaced tropic acid in the synthesis of homatropine.

Other drugs and drug candidates have been synthesized from mandelic acid, including Cefamandole.

=== Toxicology ===
Mandelic acid levels in human urine are a standard biomarker for styrene exposure in industrial hygiene. The unstable metabolite styrene-(7,8)-oxide (styrene oxide) is oxidized into mandelic acid and phenylglyoxylic acid, then exits the body in urine. It is also a biomarker for ethylbenzene exposure. Daily end-of-shift urine collection to monitor styrene exposure is recommended by American Conference of Governmental Industrial Hygienists (ACGIH).

== History ==
Mandelic acid was discovered in 1831 by the German pharmacist Ferdinand Ludwig Winckler (1801–1868) while heating amygdalin, an extract of bitter almonds, with diluted hydrochloric acid. The name is derived from the German "Mandel" for "almond".

The short-acting eye dilation effect as part of homatropine was discovered by chemist Alfred Ladenburg in 1880. Mandelic acid then replaced tropic acid in the synthesis of homatropine.

Takeru Higuchi and Roy Kuramoto demonstrated one of the earliest forms of pharmaceutical cocrystals in studies published during 1954 that involved mandelic acid.

== Safety and handling ==
Mandelic acid is moderately toxic if ingested. It is poisonous if injected. Frequent absorption can result in kidney irritation. When burning, mandelic acid emits acrid smoke and fumes.

Exposing the white crystal form to light will darken to brown and decompose the crystals over time.

== See also ==
- Salicylic acid
- Lactic acid
