= Amygdalin =

Cyanogenic glycoside present in seeds of fruit

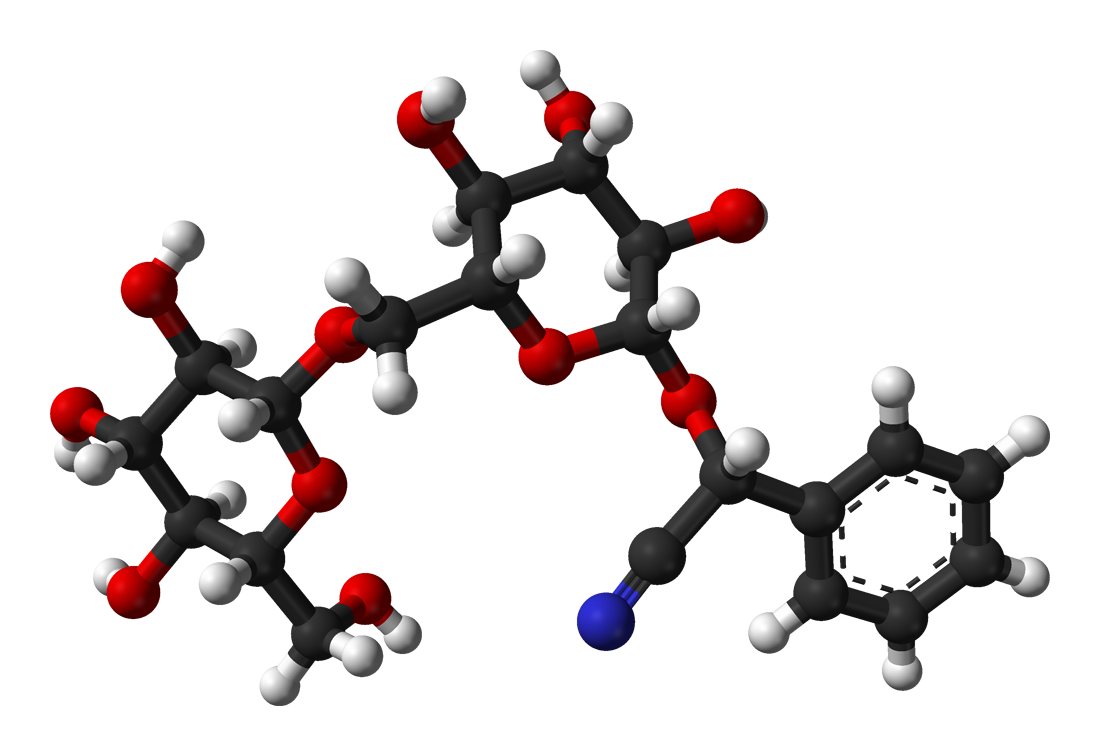

Names
- IUPAC name (2R)-[β-D-Glucopyranosyl-(1→6)-β-D-glucopyranosyloxy]phenylacetonitrile
- Systematic IUPAC name (2R)-Phenyl{[(2R,3R,4S,5S,6R)-3,4,5-trihydroxy-6-({[(2R,3R,4S,5S,6R)-3,4,5-trihydroxy-6-(hydroxymethyl)oxan-2-yl]oxy}methyl)oxan-2-yl]oxy}acetonitrile

Identifiers
CAS Number	29883-15-6
3D model (JSmol)	Interactive image; Interactive image
Beilstein Reference	66856
ChEBI	CHEBI:17019
ChEMBL	ChEMBL461727
ChemSpider	570897
ECHA InfoCard	100.045.372
EC Number	249-925-3
MeSH	Amygdalin
PubChem CID	656516
UNII	214UUQ9N0H
CompTox Dashboard (EPA)	DTXSID00897159
- InChI: InChI=1S/C20H27NO11/c21-6-10(9-4-2-1-3-5-9)30-20-18(28)16(26)14(24)12(32-20)8-29-19-17(27)15(25)13(23)11(7-22)31-19/h1-5,10-20,22-28H,7-8H2/t10-,11+,12+,13+,14+,15-,16-,17+,18+,19+,20+/m0/s1 Key: XUCIJNAGGSZNQT-JHSLDZJXSA-N; InChI=1/C20H27NO11/c21-6-10(9-4-2-1-3-5-9)30-20-18(28)16(26)14(24)12(32-20)8-29-19-17(27)15(25)13(23)11(7-22)31-19/h1-5,10-20,22-28H,7-8H2/t10-,11+,12+,13+,14+,15-,16-,17+,18+,19+,20+/m0/s1 Key: XUCIJNAGGSZNQT-JHSLDZJXBT
- SMILES: O[C@@H]3[C@@H](O)[C@H](O)[C@@H](CO)O[C@H]3OC[C@H]2O[C@@H](OC(C#N)c1ccccc1)[C@H](O)[C@@H](O)[C@@H]2O; N#C[C@H](O[C@@H]2O[C@H](CO[C@@H]1O[C@@H]([C@@H](O)[C@H](O)[C@H]1O)CO)[C@@H](O)[C@H](O)[C@H]2O)c3ccccc3

Properties
Chemical formula	C_{20}H_{27}NO_{11}
Molar mass	457.429
Melting point	223–226 °C (433–439 °F; 496–499 K)
Solubility in water	H2O: 0.1 g/mL hot, clear to very faintly turbid, colorless

Hazards
- GHS labelling
Pictograms	(GHS07: Exclamation mark)
Signal word	Warning
Hazard statements	H302
Precautionary statements	P264, P270, P301+P312, P330, P501
NFPA 704 (fire diamond)	1 0 0
Safety data sheet (SDS)	A6005

Related compounds
Related compounds	Vicianin, laetrile, prunasin, sambunigrin
- Except where otherwise noted, data are given for materials in their standard state (at 25 °C [77 °F], 100 kPa). verify (what is ?) Infobox references

Amygdalin (from Ancient Greek: ἀμυγδαλή amygdalē 'almond') is a naturally occurring chemical compound found in many plants, such as the seeds (kernels, pips or stones) of apricots, bitter almonds, apples, peaches, cherries and plums, and in the roots of manioc.

Amygdalin is classified as a cyanogenic glycoside, because each amygdalin molecule includes a nitrile group, which can be released as the toxic cyanide anion. This can occur when exposed to a beta-glucosidase, which cleaves the two glucose residues (or β-D-glucosyls) bound with beta-glycosidic linkages. Eating amygdalin will cause it to release cyanide in the human body, and may lead to cyanide poisoning.

Since the early 1950s, both amygdalin and a chemical derivative named laetrile have been promoted as alternative cancer treatments, often under the misnomer vitamin B_{17} (neither amygdalin nor laetrile is a vitamin). Scientific study has found them to not only be clinically ineffective in treating cancer but also dangerous due to the considerable poisoning risks. The promotion of laetrile to treat cancer has been described in the medical literature as a canonical example of quackery and as "the slickest, most sophisticated, and certainly the most remunerative cancer quack promotion in medical history". Amygdalin has also been examined in the context of traditional Chinese medicine.

== Sources ==
Amygdalin is contained in Rosaceae plants, stone fruit kernels, such as almonds, apricot (14 g/kg), red cherry (3.9 g/kg), black cherry (2.7 g/kg), peach (6.8 g/kg), and plum (4–17.5 g/kg depending on variety), and nectarine (0.1 g/kg) and also in the seeds of the apple (3 g/kg). In one study, bitter almond amygdalin concentrations ranged from 33 to 54 g/kg depending on variety; semibitter varieties averaged 1 g/kg and sweet varieties averaged 0.063 g/kg with significant variability based on variety and growing region. Amygdalin can also be found in trace amounts in non-Rosaceae seeds of plants such as courgettes (0.21 g/kg) and cucumbers (0.06 g/kg).

== Chemistry ==
Amygdalin is a cyanogenic glycoside derived from the aromatic amino acid phenylalanine. Amygdalin and prunasin are common among plants of the family Rosaceae, particularly the genus Prunus; Poaceae (grasses), Fabaceae (legumes), and in other food plants, including flaxseed and manioc. Within these plants, amygdalin and the enzymes necessary to hydrolyze it are stored in separate locations, and only mix as a result of tissue damage. This provides a natural defense system.

Benzaldehyde released from amygdalin provides a bitter flavor. Because of a difference in a recessive gene called Sweet kernel [Sk], much less amygdalin is present in nonbitter (or sweet) almond than bitter almond.

For one method of isolating amygdalin, the stones are removed from the fruit and cracked to obtain the kernels, which are dried in the sun or in ovens. The kernels are boiled in ethanol; on evaporation of the solution and the addition of diethyl ether, amygdalin is precipitated as minute white crystals. Natural amygdalin has the (R)-configuration at the chiral phenyl center. Under mild basic conditions, this stereogenic center isomerizes; the (S)-epimer is called neoamygdalin. Although the synthesized version of amygdalin is the (R)-epimer, the stereogenic center attached to the nitrile and phenyl groups easily epimerizes if the manufacturer does not store the compound correctly.

Amygdalin is hydrolyzed by intestinal β-glucosidase (emulsin) and amygdalin beta-glucosidase (amygdalase) to give gentiobiose and L-mandelonitrile. Gentiobiose is further hydrolyzed to give glucose, whereas mandelonitrile (the cyanohydrin of benzaldehyde) decomposes to give benzaldehyde and hydrogen cyanide. Hydrogen cyanide in sufficient quantities (allowable daily intake: ~0.6 mg) causes cyanide poisoning which has a fatal oral dose range of 0.6–1.5 mg/kg of body weight.

== Laetrile ==
Laetrile

Names
- IUPAC name (2S,3S,4S,5R,6R)-6-[(R)-cyano(phenyl)methoxy]-3,4,5-trihydroxyoxane-2-carboxylic acid
- Other names L-mandelonitrile-β-D-glucuronide, Vitamin B_{17}

Identifiers
CAS Number	1332-94-1
3D model (JSmol)	Interactive image
ChemSpider	4588479
ECHA InfoCard	100.045.372
PubChem CID	5484354
CompTox Dashboard (EPA)	DTXSID00897159
- InChI: InChI=1S/C14H15NO7/c15-6-8(7-4-2-1-3-5-7)21-14-11(18)9(16)10(17)12(22-14)13(19)20/h1-5,8-12,14,16-18H,(H,19,20)/t8-,9-,10-,11+,12-,14+/m0/s1 Key: XLSLFPQAPYONPW-WHUHBCJBSA-N
- SMILES: c1ccc(cc1)[C@H](C#N)O[C@H]2[C@@H]([C@H]([C@@H]([C@H](O2)C(=O)O)O)O)O

Properties
Chemical formula	C_{14}H_{15}NO_{7}
Molar mass	309.2714
Melting point	214 to 216 °C (417 to 421 °F; 487 to 489 K)
- Except where otherwise noted, data are given for materials in their standard state (at 25 °C [77 °F], 100 kPa). Infobox references

Laetrile (patented 1961) is a simpler semisynthetic derivative of amygdalin. Laetrile is synthesized from amygdalin by hydrolysis, and contains a glucuronic acid unit instead of amygdalin's two glucose units. The usual preferred commercial source is from apricot kernels (Prunus armeniaca). The name is derived from the words "laevorotatory" (referring to the molecule's stereochemistry) and "mandelonitrile" (the portion of the molecule from which cyanide is released by decomposition). A 500 mg laetrile tablet may contain between 2.5 and 25 mg of hydrogen cyanide.

Like amygdalin, laetrile is hydrolyzed in the duodenum (alkaline) and the intestine (enzymatically) to D-glucuronic acid and L-mandelonitrile; the latter hydrolyzes to benzaldehyde and hydrogen cyanide, that in sufficient quantities causes cyanide poisoning.

Claims for laetrile were based on various claims, including that laetrile is the discovered vitamin B-17, and that cancer results from "B-17 deficiency". This claim postulated that regular dietary administration of laetrile would prevent all incidences of cancer. There is no evidence supporting this conjecture in the form of a physiologic process, nutritional requirement, or identification of any deficiency syndrome. The term "vitamin B-17" is not recognized as a valid vitamin or micronutrient. Ernst T. Krebs (not to be confused with Hans Adolf Krebs, the discoverer of the citric acid cycle) branded laetrile as a vitamin in order to have it classified as a nutritional supplement rather than as a pharmaceutical.

=== History of laetrile ===
==== Early usage ====
Amygdalin was first isolated in 1830 from bitter almond seeds (Prunus dulcis) by Pierre-Jean Robiquet and Antoine Boutron-Charlard. Justus von Liebig and Friedrich Woehler found three hydrolysis products of amygdalin: sugar, benzaldehyde, and hydrogen cyanide. Later research showed that sulfuric acid hydrolyzes it into D-glucose, benzaldehyde, and hydrogen cyanide; while hydrochloric acid gives mandelic acid, D-glucose, and ammonia.

In 1845, amygdalin was used as a cancer treatment in Russia, and in the 1920s in the United States, but it was considered too poisonous. In the 1950s, a purportedly non-toxic, synthetic form was patented for use as a meat preservative, and later marketed as laetrile for cancer treatment. As US usage increased, a National Cancer Institute analysis found contaminants in both injectable and oral forms of amygdalin produced by major foreign suppliers.

The U.S. Food and Drug Administration prohibited the interstate shipment of amygdalin and laetrile in 1977. Thereafter, 27 U.S. states legalized the use of amygdalin within those states.

==== Subsequent results ====
In a 1977 controlled, blinded trial, laetrile showed no more activity than placebo. Subsequently, laetrile was tested on 14 tumor systems without evidence of effectiveness. The Memorial Sloan–Kettering Cancer Center (MSKCC) concluded that "laetrile showed no beneficial effects." Mistakes in an earlier MSKCC press release were highlighted by a group of laetrile proponents led by Ralph Moss, a former public affairs official for MSKCC who had been fired following his appearance at a press conference accusing the hospital of covering up the benefits of laetrile. These mistakes were considered scientifically inconsequential, but Nicholas Wade, in Science, stated that "even the appearance of a departure from strict objectivity is unfortunate." The results from these studies were published all together.

A 2015 systematic review from the Cochrane Collaboration found:

The claims that laetrile or amygdalin have beneficial effects for cancer patients are not currently supported by sound clinical data. There is a considerable risk of serious adverse effects from cyanide poisoning after laetrile or amygdalin, especially after oral ingestion. The risk–benefit balance of laetrile or amygdalin as a treatment for cancer is therefore unambiguously negative.

The authors also recommended, on ethical and scientific grounds, that no further clinical research into laetrile or amygdalin be conducted. Subsequent research has confirmed the evidence of harm and lack of benefit.

Given the lack of evidence, neither the U.S. Food and Drug Administration nor the European Commission has approved laetrile. The U.S. National Institutes of Health evaluated the evidence separately and concluded that clinical trials of amygdalin showed little or no effect against cancer. For example, a 1982 trial by the Mayo Clinic of 175 patients found that tumor size had increased in all but one patient. The authors reported that "the hazards of amygdalin therapy were evidenced in several patients by symptoms of cyanide toxicity or by blood cyanide levels approaching the lethal range." The study concluded, "Patients exposed to this agent should be instructed about the danger of cyanide poisoning, and their blood cyanide levels should be carefully monitored. Amygdalin (Laetrile) is a toxic drug that is not effective as a cancer treatment".

Additionally, "No controlled clinical trials (trials that compare groups of patients who receive the new treatment to groups who do not) of laetrile have been reported."

The side effects of laetrile treatment are the symptoms of cyanide poisoning. These symptoms include: nausea and vomiting, headache, dizziness, cherry red skin color, liver damage, abnormally low blood pressure, droopy upper eyelid, trouble walking due to damaged nerves, fever, mental confusion, coma, and death. Mental obtundation and delayed stimulus response have also been reported.

The European Food Safety Agency's Panel on Contaminants in the Food Chain has studied the potential toxicity of the amygdalin in apricot kernels. The Panel reported, "If consumers follow the recommendations of websites that promote consumption of apricot kernels, their exposure to cyanide will greatly exceed" the dose expected to be toxic. The Panel also reported that acute cyanide toxicity had occurred in adults who had consumed 20 or more kernels and that in children, "five or more kernels appear to be toxic".

=== Advocacy and legality of laetrile ===
Advocates for laetrile assert that there is a conspiracy between the US Food and Drug Administration, the pharmaceutical industry, and the medical community, including the American Medical Association and the American Cancer Society, to exploit the American people, and especially cancer patients.

Advocates of the use of laetrile have also changed the rationale for its use, first as a treatment of cancer, then as a vitamin, then as part of a "holistic" nutritional regimen, or as treatment for cancer pain, among others, none of which have any significant evidence supporting its use. Despite the lack of evidence for its use, laetrile developed a significant following due to its wide promotion as a "pain-free" treatment of cancer as an alternative to surgery and chemotherapy that have significant side effects. The use of laetrile led to a number of deaths. The FDA and AMA crackdown, begun in the 1970s, effectively escalated prices on the black market, played into the conspiracy narrative, and enabled unscrupulous profiteers to foster multimillion-dollar smuggling empires.

Some American cancer patients have traveled to Mexico for treatment with the substance, for example at the Oasis of Hope Hospital in Tijuana. The actor Steve McQueen died in Mexico following surgery to remove a stomach tumor, having previously undergone extended treatment for pleural mesothelioma—a cancer associated with asbestos exposure—under the care of William Donald Kelley, a de-licensed dentist and orthodontist who claimed to have devised a cancer treatment involving pancreatic enzymes, 50 daily vitamins and minerals, frequent body shampoos, enemas, a specific diet, and laetrile.

Laetrile advocates in the United States include Dean Burk, a former chief chemist of the National Cancer Institute cytochemistry laboratory, and national arm wrestling champion Jason Vale, who falsely claimed that his kidney and pancreatic cancers were cured by eating apricot seeds. Vale was convicted in 2004 for, among other things, fraudulently marketing laetrile as a cancer cure. The court also found that Vale had made at least $500,000 from his fraudulent sales of laetrile.

In New Zealand, laetrile was among the purported treatments for cancer promoted by Milan Brych, who was later convicted of medical fraud.

In the 1970s, court cases in several states challenged the FDA's authority to restrict access to what they claimed were potentially lifesaving drugs. More than twenty states passed laws making the use of laetrile legal. After the unanimous Supreme Court ruling in United States v. Rutherford, which established that interstate transport of the compound was illegal, usage fell off dramatically. The FDA continues to seek jail sentences for vendors marketing laetrile for cancer treatment, calling it a "highly toxic product that has not shown any effect on treating cancer."

== See also ==
- List of ineffective cancer treatments
- Alternative cancer treatments
