= Cyanohydrin =

Functional group in organic chemistry

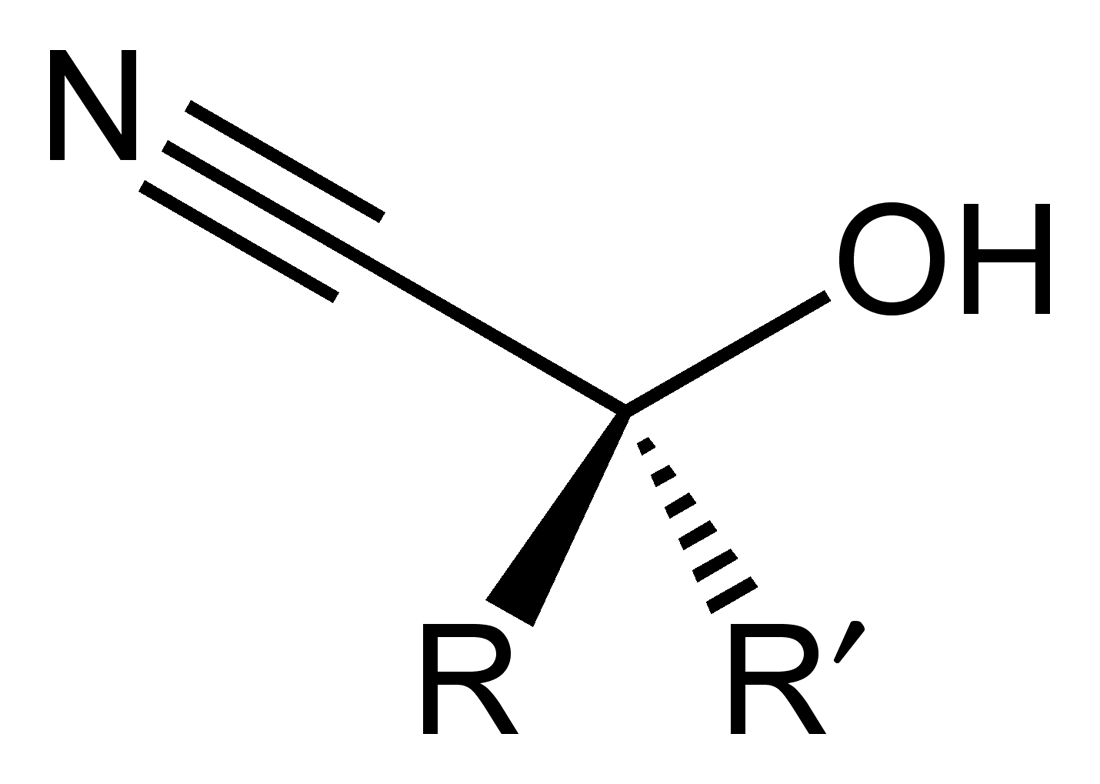
Skeletal diagram of the cyanohydrin functional group

In organic chemistry, a cyanohydrin or hydroxynitrile is a functional group found in organic compounds in which a cyano and a hydroxy group are attached to the same carbon atom. The general formula is R_{2}C(OH)CN, where R is H, alkyl, or aryl. Cyanohydrins can be formed by the cyanohydrin reaction, which involves treating a ketone or an aldehyde with hydrogen cyanide (HCN) in the presence of excess amounts of sodium cyanide (NaCN) as a catalyst:

RR'C=O + HCN → RR'C(OH)CN

In this reaction, the nucleophilic CN^{−} ion attacks the electrophilic carbonyl carbon in the ketone, followed by protonation by HCN, thereby regenerating the cyanide anion.

Cyanohydrins are industrially important precursors to carboxylic acids and some amino acids: they are intermediates in the Strecker amino acid synthesis. In aqueous acid, they are hydrolyzed to the α-hydroxy acid.

== Preparative methods ==
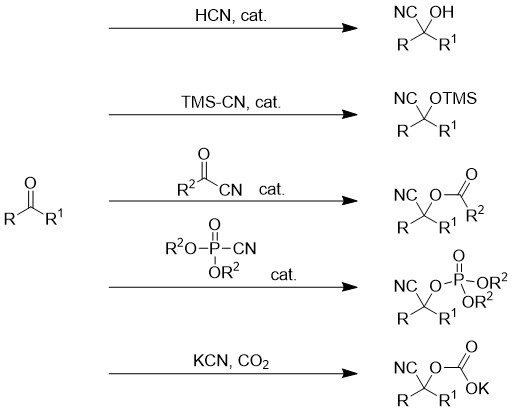
Cyanide additions generating a cyanohydrin

Cyanohydrins are traditionally prepared by the addition of HCN to the corresponding carbonyl. The reaction is typically catalyzed by base or an enzyme. Because of the hazards with HCN, other less dangerous cyanation reagents are often used.

- Trimethylsilyl cyanide, affording the silyl ether derivative of the cyanohydrin
- Diethylaluminium cyanide, especially for less reactive carbonyls
- Diethyl phosphorocyanidate (DEPC) and lithium cyanide
- Acyl cyanides (RC(O)CN)

The latter can also form cyanohydrins through a Claisen condensation-like reaction, adding a carbanion nucleophile at the carbonyl.

Cyanohydrins are also prepared by displacement of sulfite by cyanide salts:

=== Transhydrocyanation ===
Acetone cyanohydrin, (CH_{3})_{2}C(OH)CN is the cyanohydrin of acetone. It is generated as an intermediate in the industrial production of methyl methacrylate. In the laboratory, this liquid serves as a source of HCN. The process is called transhydrocyanation, where acetone cyanohydrin, is used as a source of HCN. Thus, acetone cyanohydrin can be used for the preparation of other cyanohydrins, for the transformation of HCN to Michael acceptors, and for the formylation of arenes. Treatment of this cyanohydrin with lithium hydride affords anhydrous lithium cyanide:

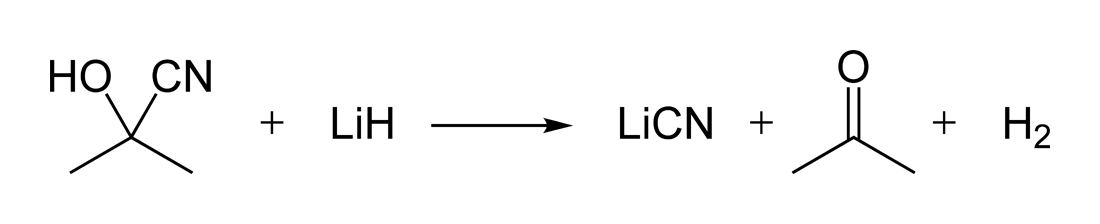

=== Asymmetric cyanohydrin formation ===
Formation of cyanohydrins introduces a chiral center for aldehydes and for unsymmetrical ketones. The enantioselective hydrocyanation has attracted some attention for the preparation of 2-chloromandelic acid, a drug precursor.

Some Prominent Cyanohydrins

Glycolonitrile, also called hydroxyacetonitrile or formaldehyde cyanohydrin, is the simplest cyanohydrin.

Acetone cyanohydrin, a common petrochemical and natural plant toxin.

Mandelonitrile, occurs in small amounts in the pits of some fruits.

Amygdalin, a naturally occurring cyanogenic glycoside

== See also ==
- Halohydrin
- Benzoin condensation
