= Mandelonitrile lyase =

Class of enzymes

(R)-mandelonitrile lyase

Identifiers
- EC no.: 4.1.2.10
- CAS no.: 9024-43-5

Databases
- BRENDA: enzyme data
- ExPASy: NiceZyme view
- KEGG: enzyme entry
- MetaCyc: metabolic pathway
- Rhea: reactions
- PDB structures: RCSB PDB PDBe PDBsum
- Gene Ontology: AmiGO / QuickGO
Search
- PMC: articles
- PubMed: articles
- NCBI: proteins

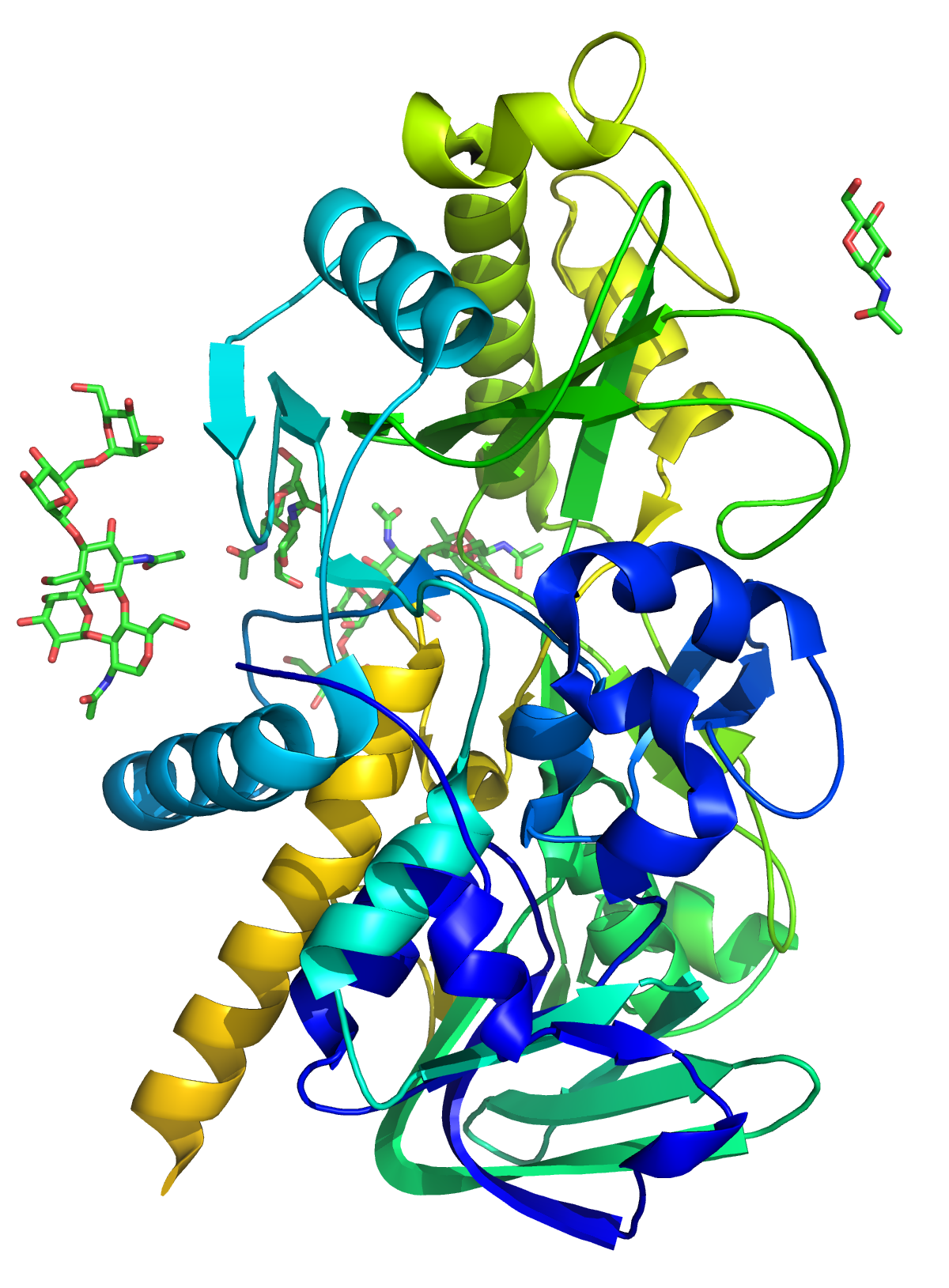
Figure 1: Model of mandelonitrile lyase based on PDB entry 1JU2

The enzyme (R)-mandelonitrile lyase (EC 4.1.2.10, (R)-HNL, (R)-oxynitrilase, (R)-hydroxynitrile lyase) catalyzes the chemical reaction

mandelonitrile $\rightleftharpoons$ hydrogen cyanide + benzaldehyde

This enzyme belongs to the family of lyases, specifically the aldehyde-lyases, which cleave carbon-carbon bonds. The systematic name of this enzyme class is mandelonitrile benzaldehyde-lyase (hydrogen cyanide-forming). Other names in common use include hydroxynitrile lyase, (R)-oxynitrilase, oxynitrilase, D-oxynitrilase, D-alpha-hydroxynitrile lyase, and mandelonitrile benzaldehyde-lyase. This enzyme participates in cyanoamino acid metabolism. It has 2 cofactors: flavin, and flavoprotein.

== Historical perspective ==
Mandelonitrile lyases, more colloquially referred to as HNLs (hydroxynitrile lyases) were first characterized by Wöhler in 1938, based on their high activity in almond. Since then, HNLs have been isolated from a wide variety of plants including stone fruits, sorghum grains, millipedes, and passion fruits.

HNLs are peculiar in that, within the same organism and even the same sample, there exist a variety of different isoforms of this enzyme. These isoforms are not able to be determined from one another based on factors influencing activity. This variety also results from macro-heterogeneity, as some isoforms bind FAD at their N-terminus while others are unable to bind FAD. It is understood that this is the case because the N-terminal fold is a region known to bind FAD as a needed cofactor. Also curious is that FAD plays no observed role in active site oxidation-reduction reactions of this enzyme. Those HNLs that bind FAD do so at a hydrophobic region neighboring the active site where it is believed that the binding of FAD confers structural stability that allows for enzymatic action. These HNL, referred to as HNL Class I (or HNL I) are also noted to have N-terminus glycosylation and the distinct heterogeneity and presence of isoforms within the same organism. HNL Class II (HNL II), on the other hand, afford a wider variety of substrates, and in general favor (S) stereochemistry, whereas HNL I stereo-selectively produce (R)-mandelonitrile.

== Structure and action ==
Due to the simple purification of this enzyme (5-30 fold purification is sufficient to reach homogeneity), its biological and biochemical analysis have been very thoroughly studied. In addition to the study of many isoforms within a given organism, there has been study dedicated to the understanding of HNL localization, the physical structure of the enzyme and its active site, and the mechanisms by which it is able to mediate this important set of reactions. Upon the purification of Black Cherry HNL, research from Wu and Poulton raised antiserum to these specific HNL, which were then applied (with colloidal gold particles in tow) to Black Cherry cotyledon and endosperm. Here it was found that HNL overwhelmingly localizes to the cell walls of these developing plants. It was so enriched in these regions that it was noted upwards of 5% of the cell wall images taken via Electron Microscopy imaged the gold particles that were indirectly labelling these proteins.

Knowing where this protein is highly localized, Figure 1 details work that highlights the structure of this protein and the residues in its active site respectively. Of specific interest, HNLs make use of a catalytically active Cys residue. While Cysteine residues are conserved throughout species in three separate locations (at the N-terminal FAD binding site, and two at the C-terminal active site), it appears that the catalytically active residue lies near the active site, suggesting an important role in HNL catalytic action. Other structural features indicative of HNL are split based on their class. While Class II HNL are known to be more heterogenous and more often seen in grains, Class I HNL are more typically FAD-binding and function as seed storage proteins. This action allows for increased amino acid metabolism in developing seeds. Because the enzyme is able to quickly reverse this reaction to create hydrogen cyanide, HNLs play an essential role in defense of the seed

As of late 2007, only one structure has been solved for this class of enzymes, with the PDB accession code PDB: 1JU2.

== Mechanism of action ==
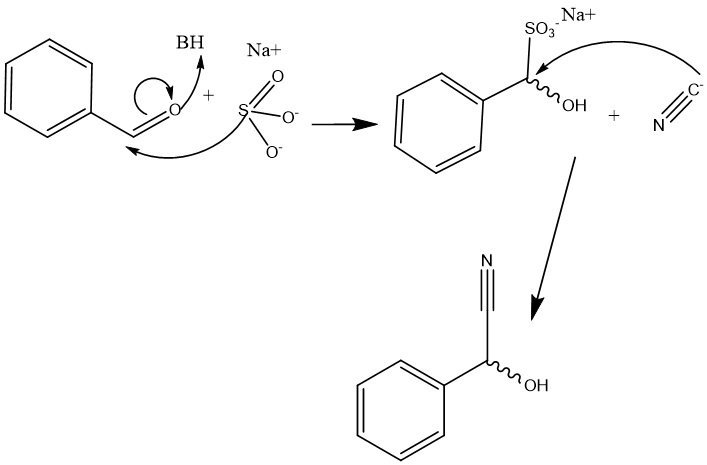
Figure 2: The general organic chemistry synthetic pathway for mandelonitrile.

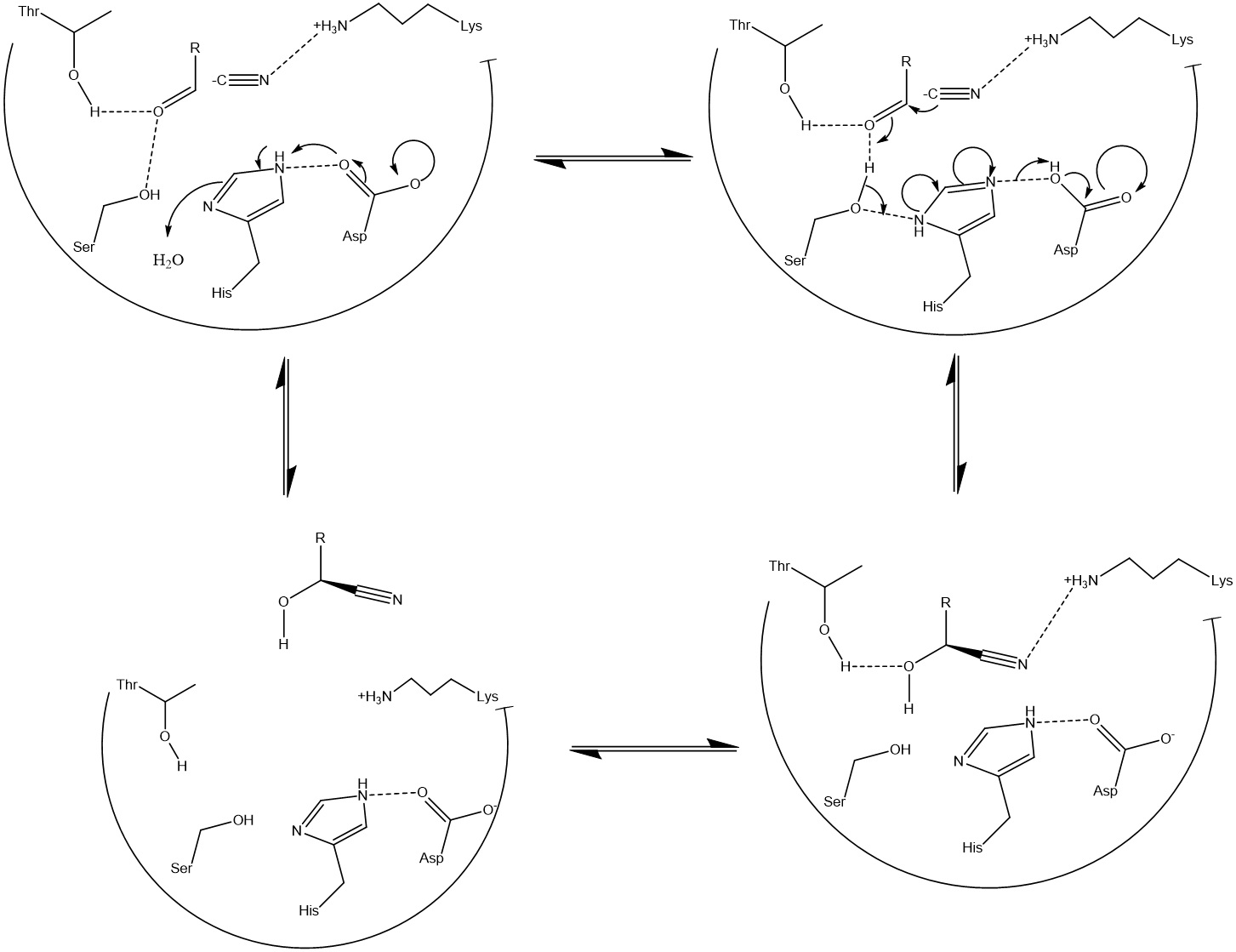
Figure 3: Generalized scheme for the enzymatic cycle and action of HNL. R group indicates a benzene ring.

HNLs are known to be stereospecific, giving the action of this enzyme a major advantage in effectively creating precursors essential to the metabolic development of amino acids and a wide range of clinically relevant small molecules. The wide variety of organisms and isoforms that constitute the HNL family however, has been determined to yield a variety of different mechanisms that facilitate this reaction in a stereospecific way. Figures 2 and 3 detail the typical synthetic and solved biochemical mechanisms for the formation of this key metabolic intermediate. Key differences between these pathways rely mostly on the lack of enantiomeric specificity conferred through the synthetic pathways despite the use of similar classes of reactions. In addition, most of the synthetic methods for facilitating this set of reactions take place in organic solvent, whereas it has been shown that HNL activity is highest at a polar-nonpolar interface.

== Disease relevance ==
HNLs and the action they mediate is a key target for study of protein engineering, as the formation of mandelonitrile is a key step in a wide variety of organic syntheses with medical and therapeutic potential. The step mediated by these enzymes is essential to the synthesis of stereospecific bond formation in (R)-Salbutamol bronchodilators, (S)-amphetamines, (1R, 2S)-(-)-ephedrine bronchodilators, in addition to many others, including Lipitor, Thalidomide, and the semi-synthesis of cephalosporin antibiotics. The importance of these mandelonitrile synthons makes the HNL class of enzymes a major target for controlled catalysis that has been optimized through work at the interface of polar and non-polar solvent conditions.
