= Benzaldehyde =

Skeletal (structural) formula
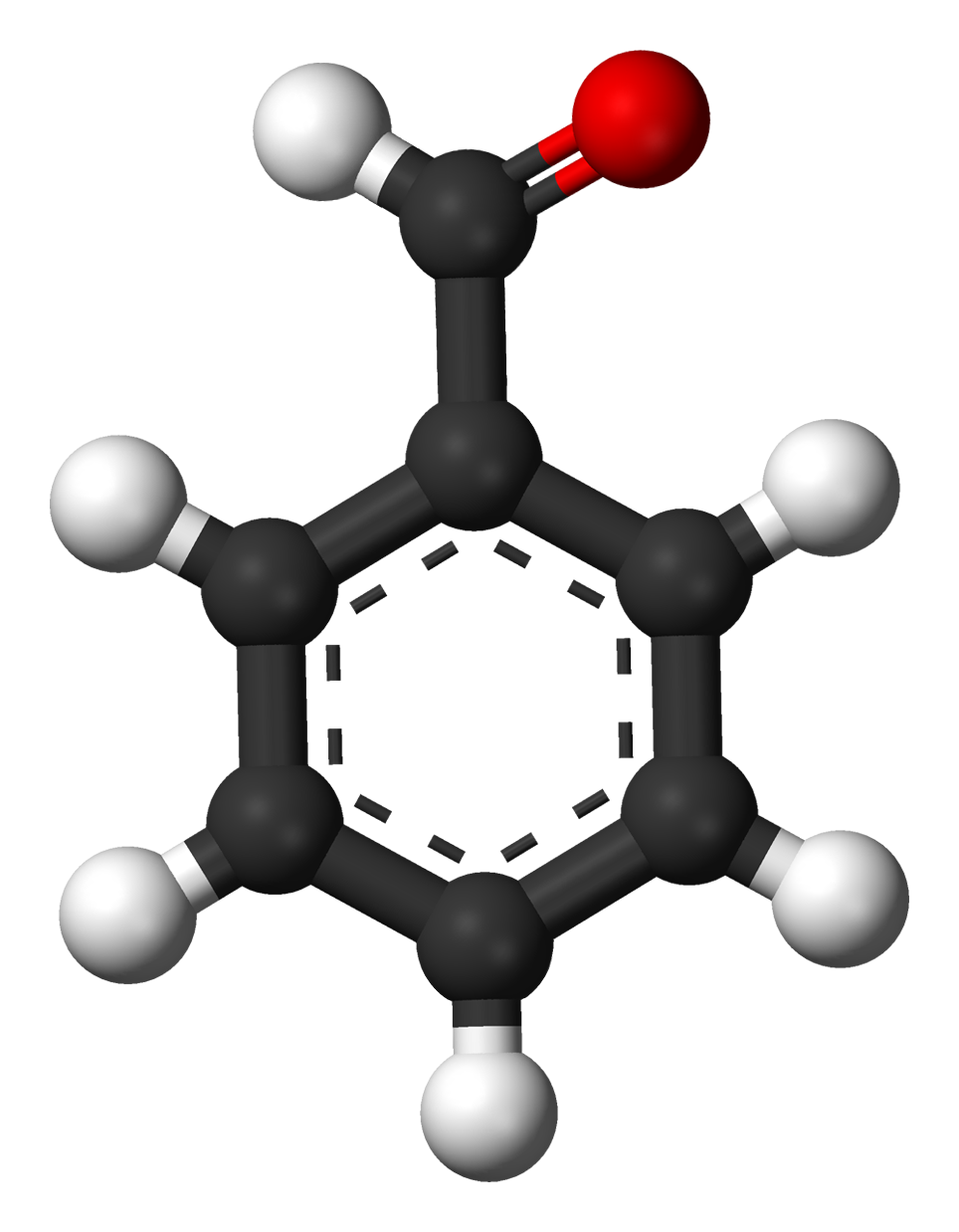
Ball-and-stick model

Names
- IUPAC name Benzenecarbaldehyde
- Preferred IUPAC name Benzaldehyde
- Other names Benzenecarboxaldehyde; Phenylmethanal; Benzoic aldehyde

Identifiers
CAS Number	100-52-7
3D model (JSmol)	Interactive image; Interactive image
Abbreviations	BzH; PhCHO; PhCOH
ChEBI	CHEBI:17169
ChEMBL	ChEMBL15972
ChemSpider	235
ECHA InfoCard	100.002.601
EC Number	202-860-4
KEGG	D02314
PubChem CID	240
RTECS number	CU437500
UNII	TA269SD04T
UN number	1990
CompTox Dashboard (EPA)	DTXSID8039241
- InChI: InChI=1S/C7H6O/c8-6-7-4-2-1-3-5-7/h1-6H Key: HUMNYLRZRPPJDN-UHFFFAOYSA-N; InChI=1/C7H6CHO/c8-6-7-4-2-1-3-5-7/h1-6H Key: HUMNYLRZRPPJDN-UHFFFAOYAE
- SMILES: O=Cc1ccccc1; c1ccc(cc1)C=O

Properties
Chemical formula	C_{7}H_{6}O
Molar mass	106.124 g·mol^{−1}
Appearance	colorless liquid strongly refractive
Odor	almond-like
Density	1.044 g/mL, liquid
Melting point	−57.12 °C (−70.82 °F; 216.03 K)
Boiling point	178.1 °C (352.6 °F; 451.2 K)
Solubility in water	6.95 g/L (25 °C)
log P	1.64
Magnetic susceptibility (χ)	−60.78·10^{−6} cm^{3}/mol
Refractive index (n_{D})	1.5456
Viscosity	1.321 cP (25 °C)

Thermochemistry
Std enthalpy of formation (Δ_{f}H^{⦵}_{298})	−36.8 kJ/mol
Std enthalpy of combustion (Δ_{c}H^{⦵}_{298})	−3525.1 kJ/mol

Hazards
- GHS labelling
Pictograms	(GHS07: Exclamation mark)
Signal word	Warning
Hazard statements	H302
Precautionary statements	P264, P270, P301+P312, P330, P501
NFPA 704 (fire diamond)	2 2 0
Flash point	64 °C (147 °F; 337 K)
Autoignition temperature	192 °C (378 °F; 465 K)
Explosive limits	1.4–8.5%
- Lethal dose or concentration (LD, LC)
LD_{50} (median dose)	1300 mg/kg (rat, oral)
Safety data sheet (SDS)	J. T. Baker

Related compounds
Related compounds	Benzyl alcohol Benzoic acid Benzaldehyde oxime
- Except where otherwise noted, data are given for materials in their standard state (at 25 °C [77 °F], 100 kPa). verify (what is ?) Infobox references

Benzaldehyde (C_{6}H_{5}CHO) is an organic compound consisting of a benzene ring with a formyl substituent. It is among the simplest aromatic aldehydes and one of the most industrially useful.

It is a colorless liquid with a characteristic odor similar to that of bitter almonds and cherry, and is commonly used in cherry-flavored sodas. A component of bitter almond oil, benzaldehyde can be extracted from a number of other natural sources. Synthetic benzaldehyde is the flavoring agent in imitation almond extract, which is used to flavor cakes and other baked goods.

== History ==
Benzaldehyde was first extracted in 1803 by the French pharmacist Martrès. His experiments focused on elucidating the nature of amygdalin, the poisonous compound found in bitter almonds, the fruit of Prunus dulcis. Further work on the oil by Pierre Robiquet and Antoine Boutron Charlard, two French chemists, produced benzaldehyde. In 1832, Friedrich Wöhler and Justus von Liebig first synthesized benzaldehyde.

== Production ==
Benzaldehyde can be produced from both petroleum-based chemicals or plant-derived chemicals. Synthetic benzaldehyde is primarily produced using liquid phase chlorination and oxidation of toluene. Numerous other methods have been developed, such as the partial oxidation of benzyl alcohol, alkali hydrolysis of benzal chloride, and the carbonylation of benzene (the Gatterman-Koch reaction).

Natural benzaldehyde is produced from cinnamaldehyde obtained from cassia oil by the retro-aldol reaction: the cinnamaldehyde is heated in an aqueous/alcoholic solution between 90 °C and 150 °C with a base (most commonly sodium carbonate or bicarbonate) for 5 to 80 hours, followed by distillation of the formed benzaldehyde. This reaction also yields acetaldehyde.

== Occurrence ==
Benzaldehyde and similar chemicals occur naturally in many foods. Most of the benzaldehyde that people eat is from natural plant foods, such as almond.

Almonds, apricot seeds, apple seeds, and cherry seed contain significant amounts of amygdalin. This glycoside breaks up under enzyme catalysis into benzaldehyde, hydrogen cyanide and two equivalents of glucose.

Amygdalin

2 H_{2}O
HCN

benzaldehyde

2 × glucose

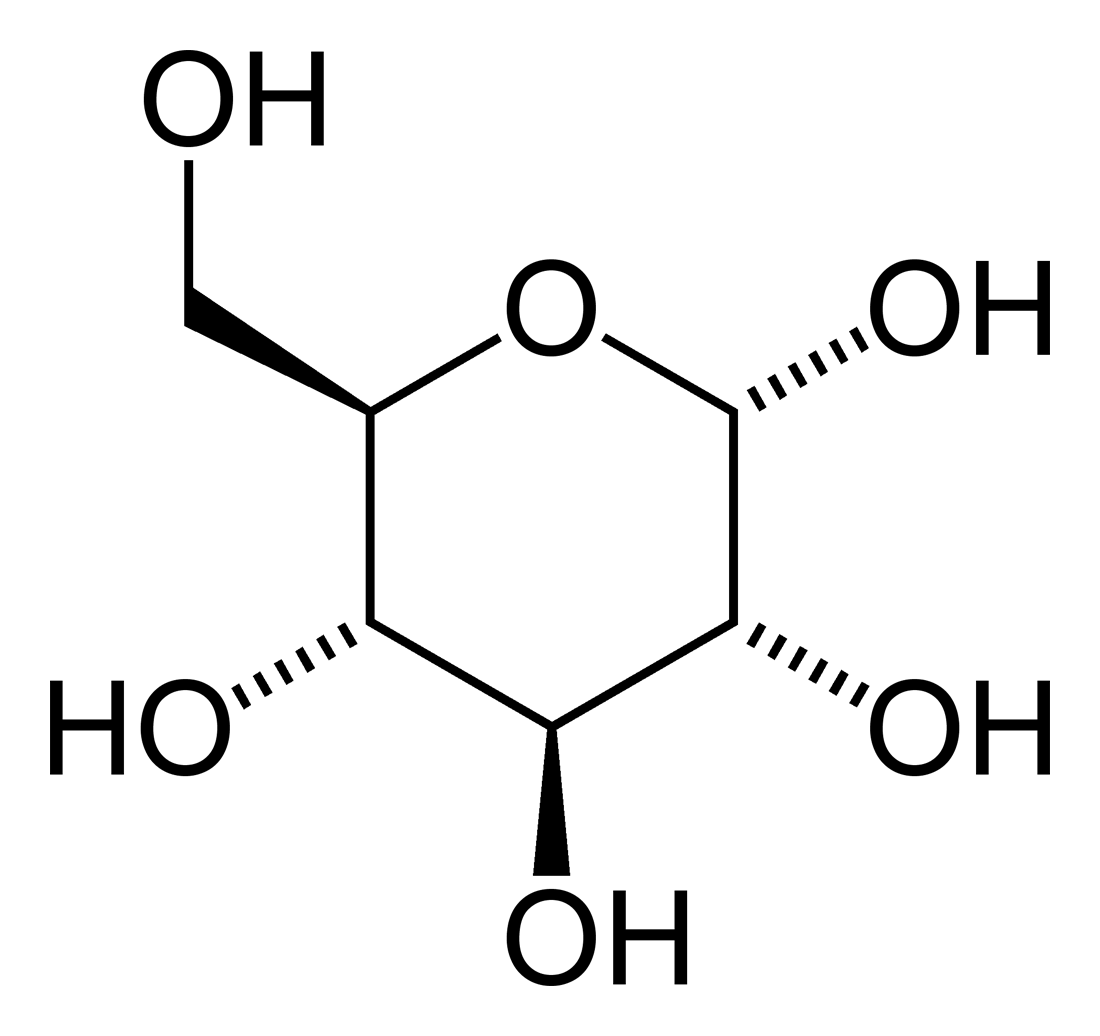
2 ×

Benzaldehyde contributes to the scent of oyster mushrooms (Pleurotus ostreatus).

== Reactions ==
Benzaldehyde is easily oxidized to benzoic acid in air at room temperature, causing a common impurity in laboratory samples. Since the boiling point of benzoic acid is much higher than that of benzaldehyde, it may be purified by distillation. Benzyl alcohol can be formed from benzaldehyde by means of hydrogenation. Reaction of benzaldehyde with anhydrous sodium acetate and acetic anhydride yields cinnamic acid, while alcoholic potassium cyanide can be used to catalyze the condensation of benzaldehyde to benzoin. Benzaldehyde undergoes disproportionation upon treatment with concentrated alkali (Cannizzaro reaction): one molecule of the aldehyde is reduced to the benzyl alcohol and another molecule is simultaneously oxidized to benzoic acid.

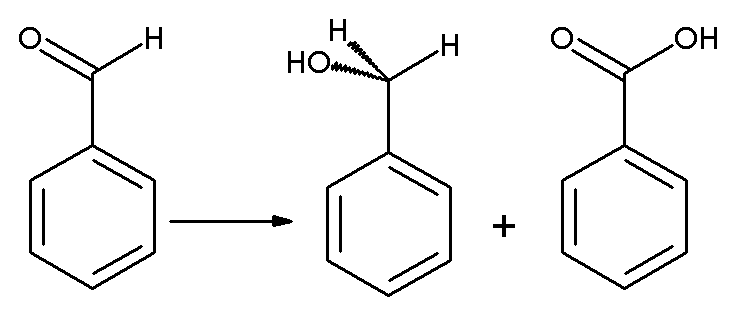

With diols, including many sugars, benzaldehyde condenses to form benzylidene acetals.

== Uses ==
Benzaldehyde is commonly employed to confer almond flavor to foods and scented products, including e-cigarette liquids. It is sometimes used in cosmetics products.

In industrial settings, benzaldehyde is used chiefly as a precursor to other organic compounds, ranging from pharmaceuticals to plastic additives. The aniline dye malachite green is prepared from benzaldehyde and dimethylaniline. Benzaldehyde is also a precursor to certain acridine dyes. Via aldol condensations, benzaldehyde is converted into derivatives of cinnamaldehyde and styrene. The synthesis of mandelic acid starts with the addition of hydrocyanic acid to benzaldehyde:

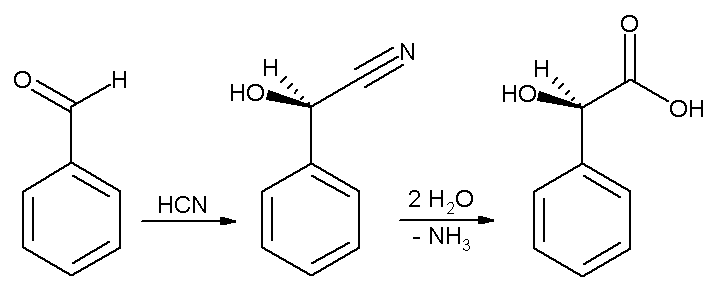

The resulting cyanohydrin is hydrolysed to mandelic acid. (The scheme above depicts only one of the two formed enantiomers.)

=== Niche uses ===
Benzaldehyde is used as a bee repellent. A small amount of benzaldehyde solution is placed on a fume board near the honeycombs. The bees then move away from the honey combs to avoid the fumes. The beekeeper can then remove the honey frames from the bee hive with less risk to both bees and beekeeper.

Benzaldehyde reacts with nitroethane in the presence of a catalyst to produce phenyl-2-nitropropene, a precursor to amphetamine and other chemicals.

== Safety ==
As used in food, cosmetics, pharmaceuticals, and soap, benzaldehyde is "generally regarded as safe" (GRAS) by the US FDA and FEMA. This status was reaffirmed after a review in 2005. It is accepted in the European Union as a flavoring agent. Toxicology studies indicate that it is safe and non-carcinogenic in the concentrations used for foods and cosmetics, and may even have anti-carcinogenic (anti-cancer) properties.

For a 70 kg human, the lethal dose is estimated at 50 ml. An acceptable daily intake of 15 mg/day has been identified for benzaldehyde by the United States Environmental Protection Agency. Benzaldehyde does not accumulate in human tissues. It is metabolized and then excreted in urine.
