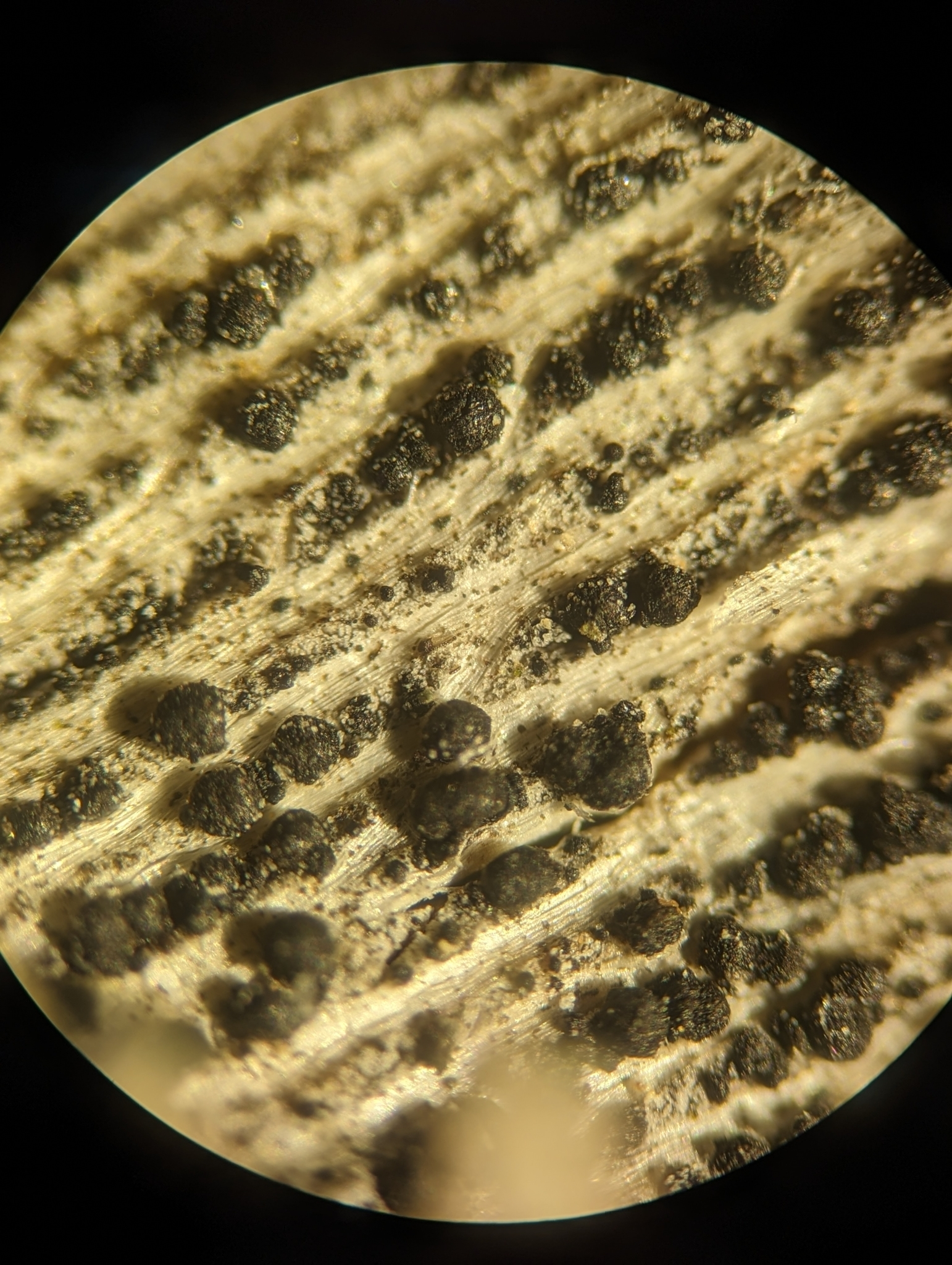

Scientific classification
- Kingdom: Fungi
- Division: Ascomycota
- Class: Dothideomycetes
- Order: Pleosporales
- Family: Pleomassariaceae
- Genus: Splanchnonema
- Species: S. platani

Binomial name
- Splanchnonema platani M.E. Barr [1982]

Synonyms
- Massaria platani Ces. (1861)

= Splanchnonema platani =

Species of fungus

Splanchnonema platani is a fungus in the genus Splanchnonema. It was formerly known under the name Massaria platani. The anamorph of the fungus is known as Macrodiplodiopsis desmazieresii. The fungus has caused serious damage to plane trees across Europe.

== Massaria disease ==
The disease, commonly known as Massaria disease, infects branches of plane trees. The fungus has usually been considered to be a weak parasite causing only minor damage such as twig dieback in warmer Mediterranean climates. However, in the 21st century it has been found associated with branch death and rapid decay within other parts of Europe, most notably Germany and Austria, the Netherlands, and parts of France. Damage caused by this fungus has been reported in the southern United States. The first formal identification of the disease in the United Kingdom came in March 2011.

The disease seems to be specific to London plane, Oriental plane and American plane. The disease causes large lesions on the upper sides of branches associated with branch drop.
