= Splanchnonema lichenisatum =

Scientific classification
- Domain: Eukaryota
- Kingdom: Fungi
- Division: Ascomycota
- Class: Dothideomycetes
- Order: Pleosporales
- Family: Pleomassariaceae
- Genus: Splanchnonema
- Species: S. lichenisatum

Binomial name
- Splanchnonema lichenisatum Aptroot & K.H.Moon (2014)

Species of lichen

Splanchnonema lichenisatum is a species of corticolous (bark-dwelling) lichen in the family Pleomassariaceae. Found in Korea, it was formally described as a new species in 2014 by Dutch lichenologist André Aptroot and Korean lichenologist Kwang-Hee Moon. The type specimen was collected by the first author from Mount Juwang (North Gyeongsang Province) at an altitude of about 350 m (1,150 ft); there, it was found growing on the bark of an ash tree.

The lichen has a thin, pinkish-brown thallus that is immersed in the bark, and covers areas of up to about 5 cm (2 in) in diameter. It lacks a cortex and does not have a prothallus. Reactions to common chemical spot tests are negative, and no lichen products were detected using thin-layer chromatography. The photobiont partner of the lichen is a trentepohlioid green alga that is about 10 by 5 μm. Two of the most unique characteristics of the species are the presence of kidney-shaped (reniform), compound ascomata, and the lichenisation–which is quite rare in the genus Splanchnonema. Aptroot described it as "clearly, but not heavily, lichenized"; this facultative association of fungus with photobiont has been termed borderline lichen.
