= Buttonball Tree =

Exceptionally large American sycamore

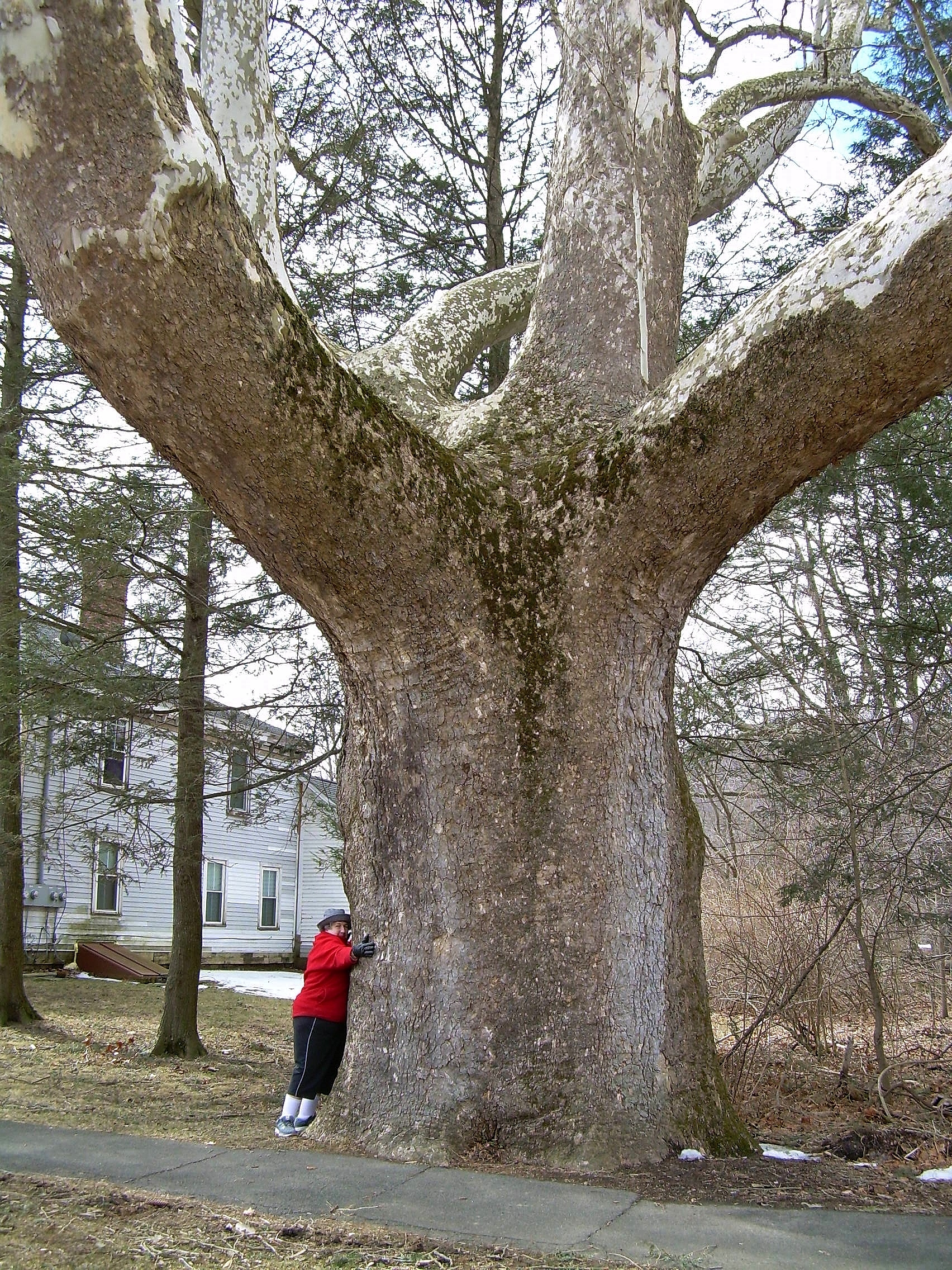
- Buttonball sycamore with an admirer in March 2019.
- Species: American sycamore (Platanus occidentalis)
- Location: North Main St., Sunderland, Massachusetts
- Coordinates: 42°28′07.83″N 72°34′42.14″W
- Date seeded: Before 1665
- Custodian: Tree Care Industry Association; International Society of Arboriculture

The Buttonball Tree is an exceptionally large American sycamore (Platanus occidentalis) located in Sunderland, Massachusetts.

Though the nickname "buttonball" has been used for all like trees, this tree retained the name, mainly because of its pure size and popularity. As of November 2019, the tree was over 113 ft (34 m) high, with a girth of 25 ft 8 in (8 m) (at 4.5 ft or 1.4 m high) and a spread of 140 ft (43 m). It is a remnant of Sunderland's forests. Because of their longevity, during the 17th and 18th century sycamores were sometimes planted at the door of new houses for newlyweds as "bride and groom" trees. Though the age of the tree is unknown, it is estimated to be well over 350 years old, with many estimates saying that the tree is closer to 400. The tree is well known and is one of the larger tourist attractions of the town.

The tree is believed to be the largest tree of its kind on the East Coast, or as locals put it, "The widest tree this side of the Mississippi."

== Plaque ==
There is a plaque set in stone in front of the tree, which was added in 1987, to commemorate the 200th anniversary of the signing of the Constitution, and the tree's age.

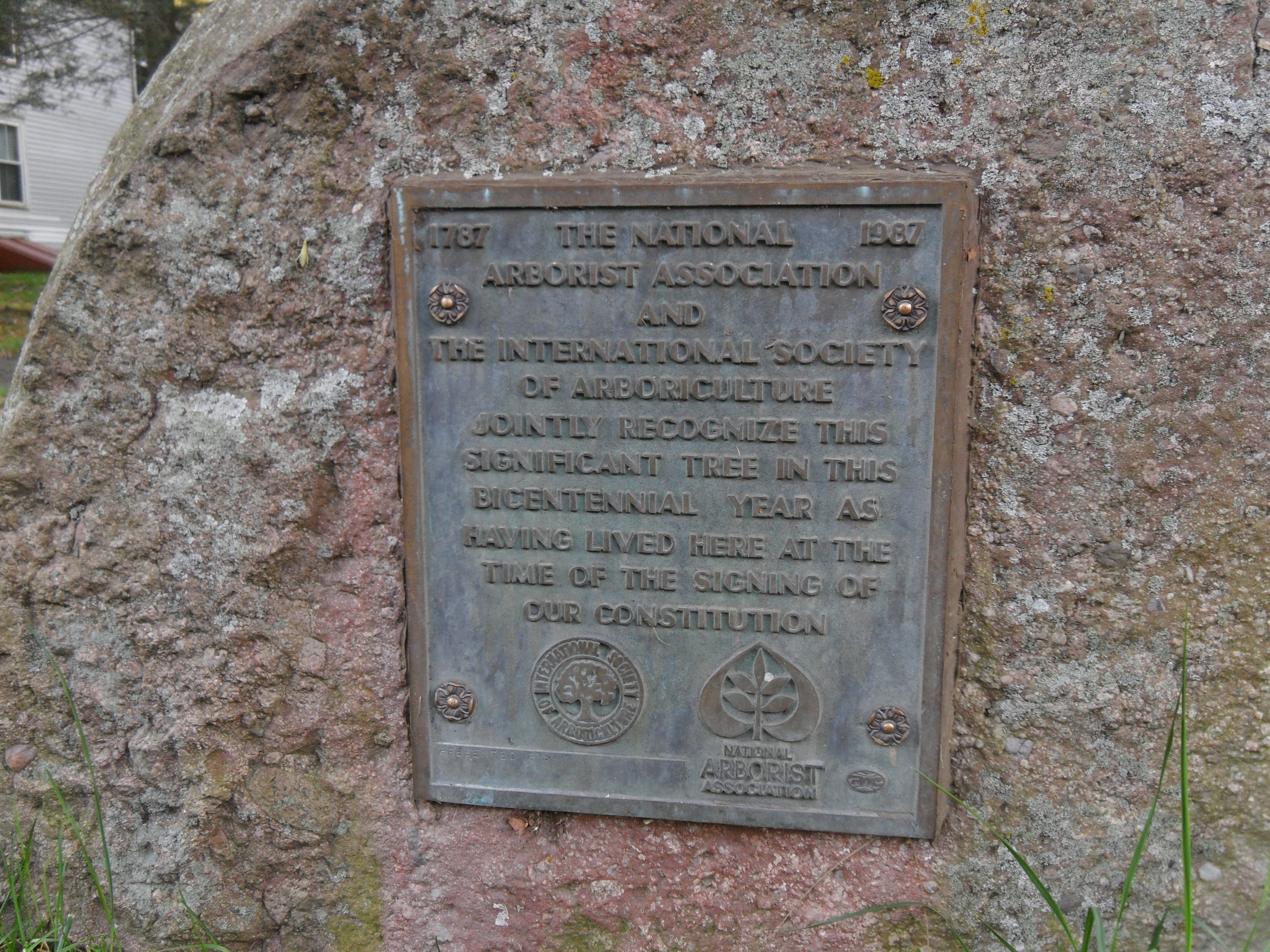
Plaque in front of the Buttonball Tree

1787 THE NATIONAL 1987
ARBORIST ASSOCIATION
AND
THE INTERNATIONAL SOCIETY
OF ARBORICULTURE
JOINTLY RECOGNIZE THIS
SIGNIFICANT TREE IN THIS
BICENTENNIAL YEAR AS
HAVING LIVED HERE AT THE
TIME OF THE SIGNING OF
OUR CONSTITUTION

== Picture gallery ==
Sunderland Buttonball Tree
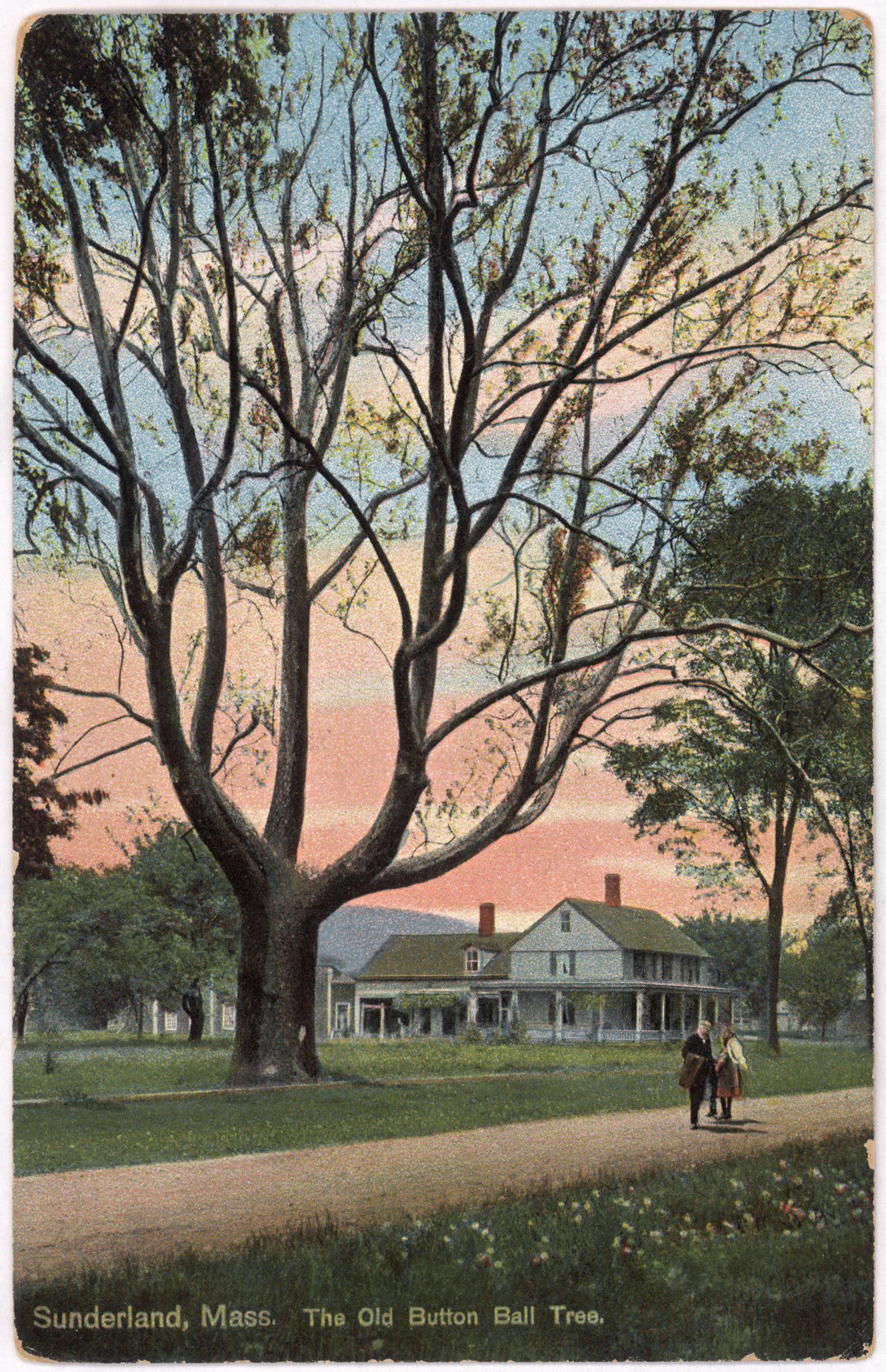
Old postcard depicting the Buttonball Tree.

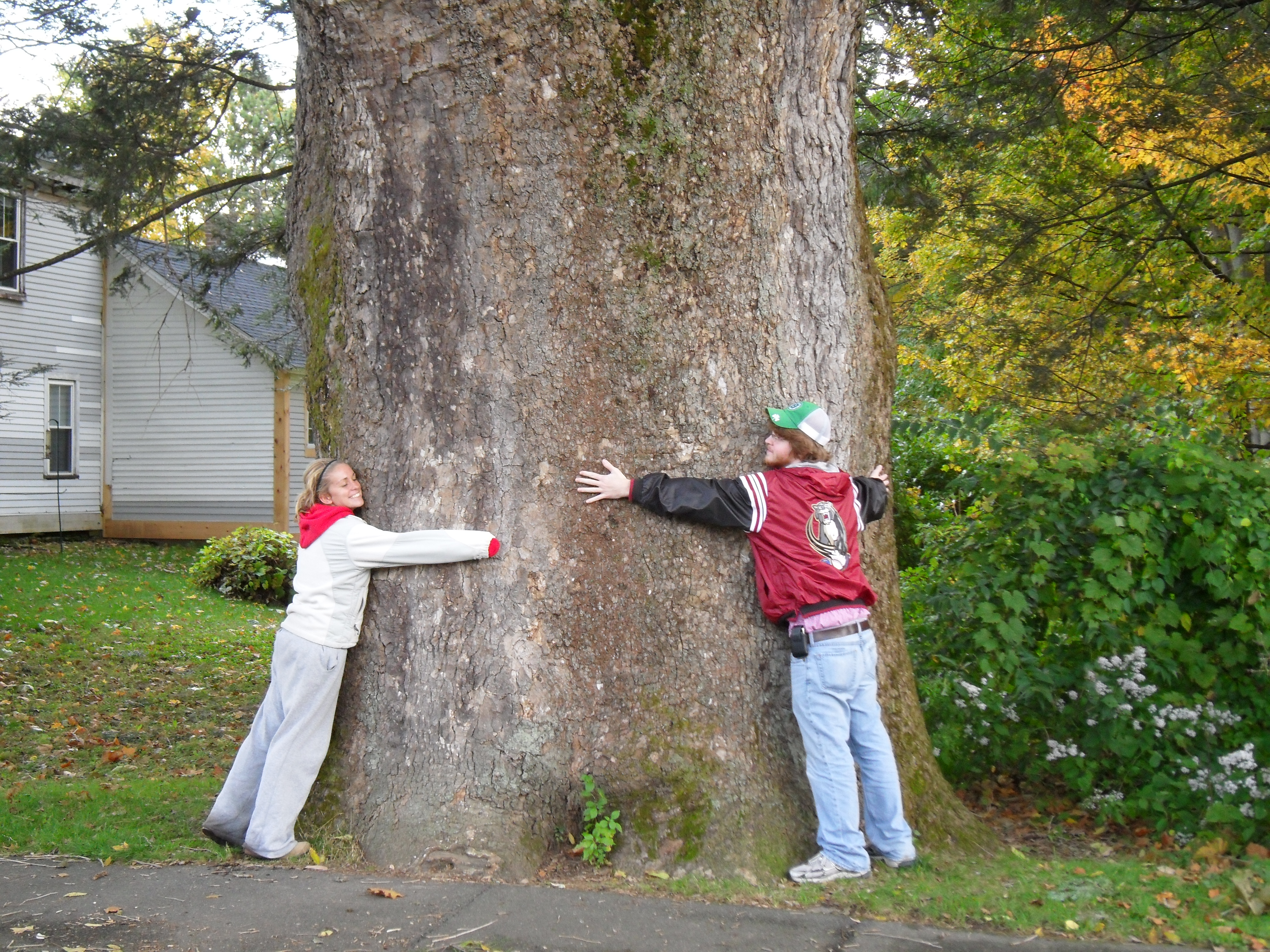
Two young adults paying their respects to the tree.

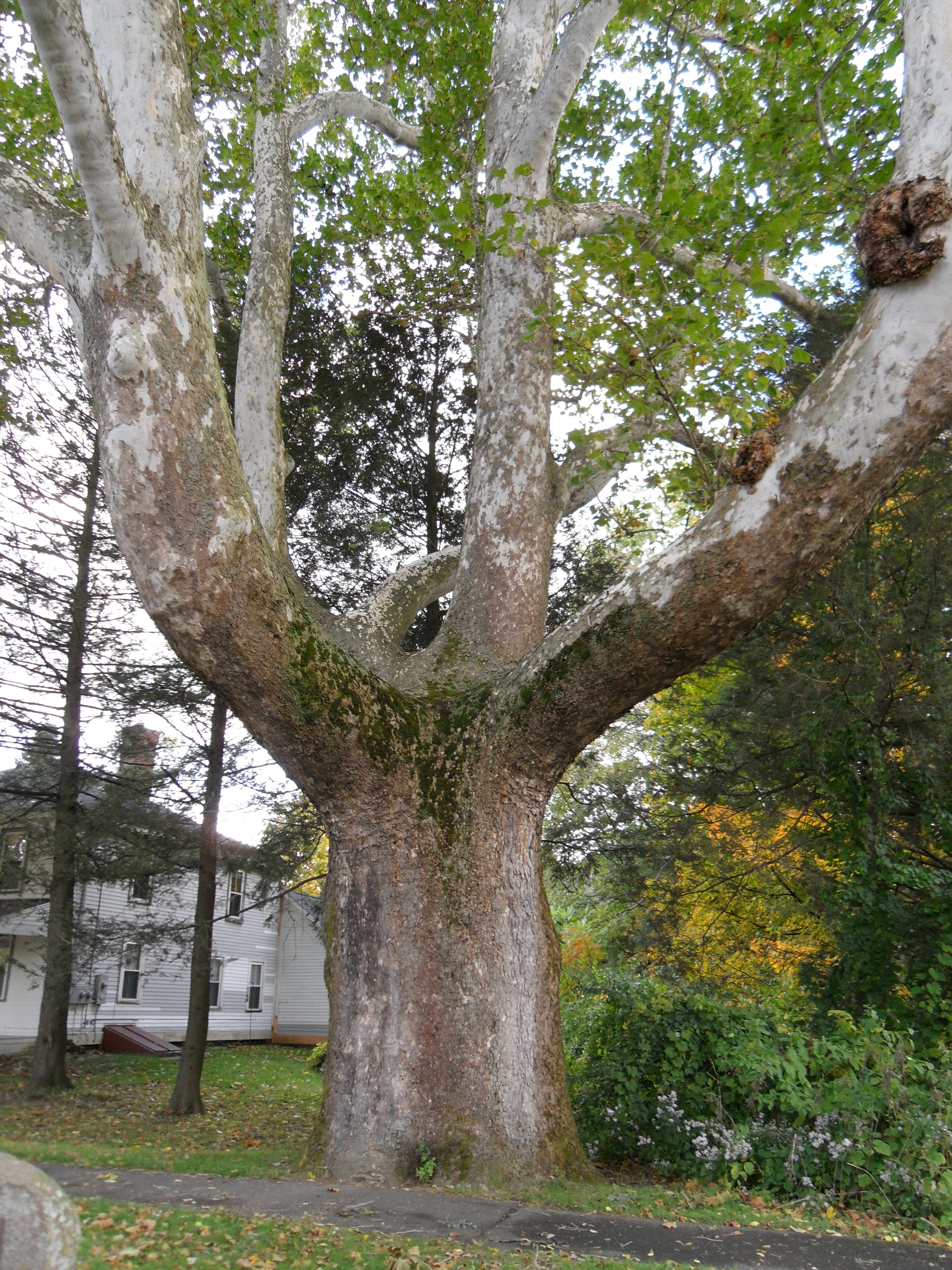
The tree in 2009.

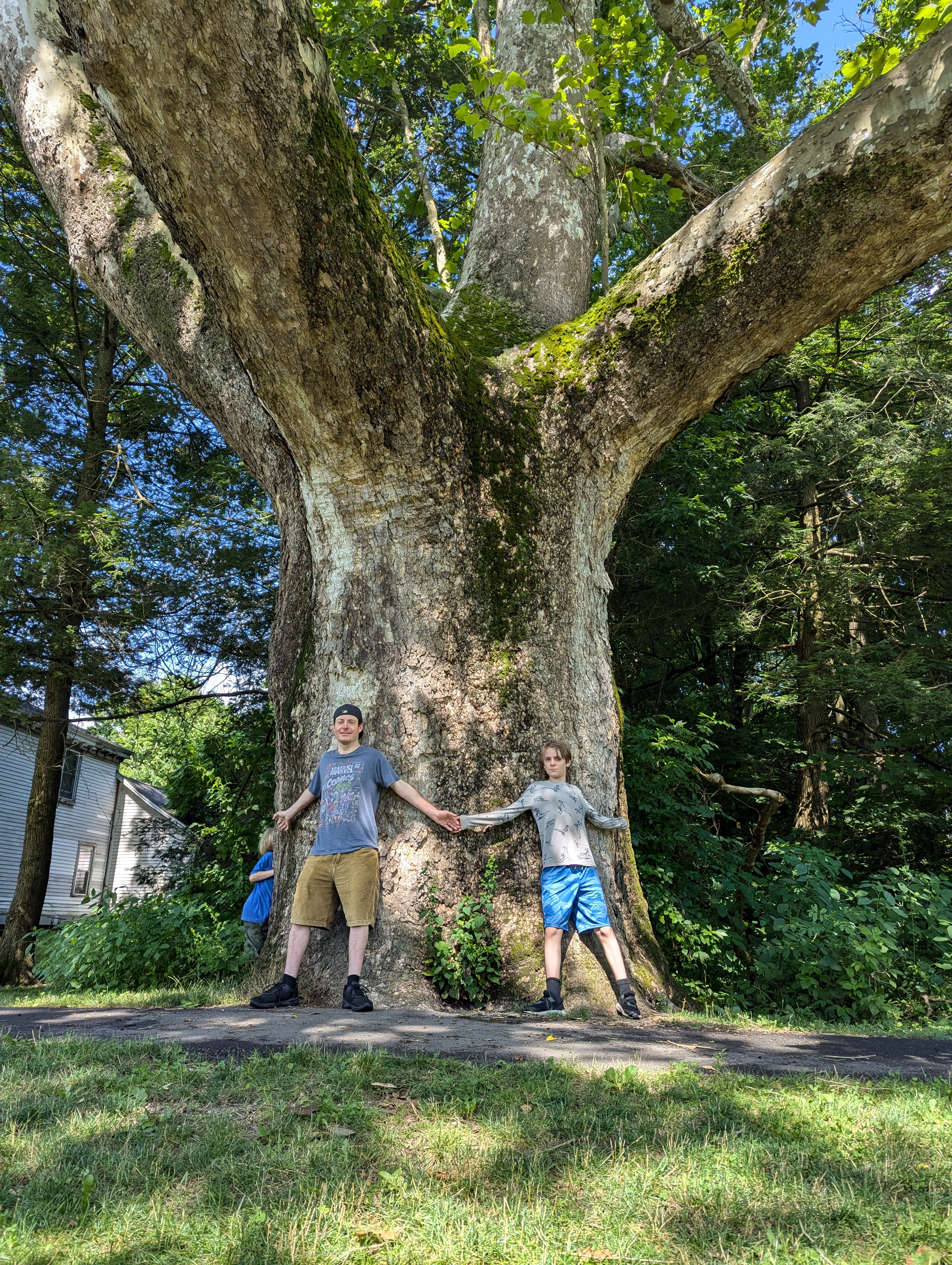
The tree in 2023.

== See also ==
- Pinchot Sycamore, an American Sycamore of larger size located in Simsbury, Connecticut
- List of individual trees
