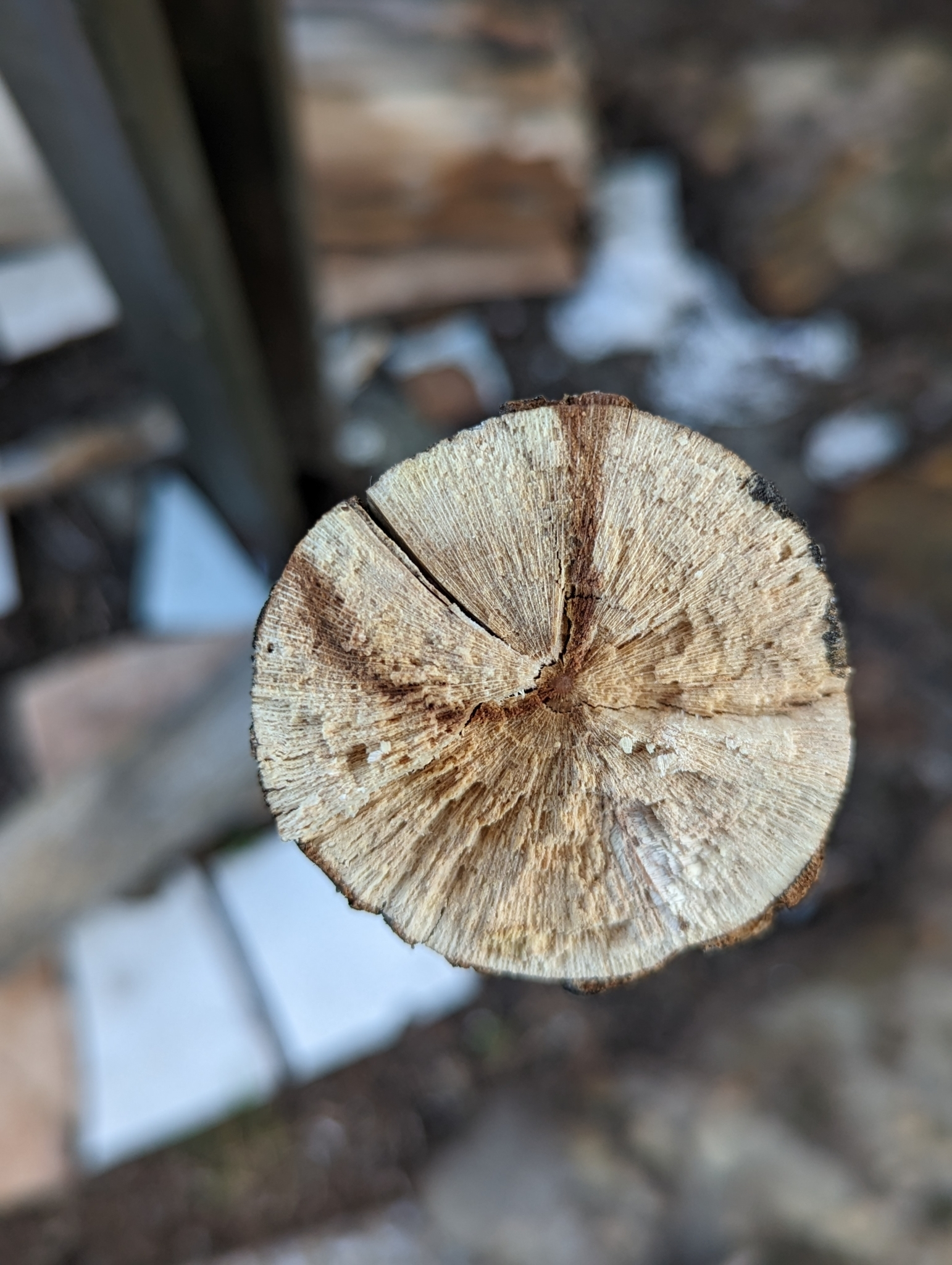
- Splanchnonema platani

Scientific classification
- Domain: Eukaryota
- Kingdom: Fungi
- Division: Ascomycota
- Class: Dothideomycetes
- Order: Pleosporales
- Family: Pleomassariaceae
- Genus: Splanchnonema; Corda (1829)

Type species
- Splanchnonema pustulatum Corda (1829)

Species
- see text

Synonyms
- Myxocyclus Riess (1852); Stigmatomassaria Munk (1953)

= Splanchnonema =

Genus of fungi

Splanchnonema is a genus of fungi in the family Pleomassariaceae. The genus was circumscribed in 1829 by August Carl Joseph Corda. One of the species, Splanchnonema lichenisatum, is a lichen.

== Species ==
- Splanchnonema annonae (Tilak, S.B.Kale & S.V.S.Kale) A.Pande (2008)
- Splanchnonema arbuti M.E.Barr (1993)
- Splanchnonema argus (Berk. & Broome) Kuntze (1898)
- Splanchnonema atroinquinans (Berk. & M.A.Curtis) Kuntze (1898)
- Splanchnonema bauhiniae (R.Rao) A.Pande (2008)
- Splanchnonema britzelmayrianum (Rehm) Boise (1985)
- Splanchnonema clandestinum M.E.Barr (1982)
- Splanchnonema dasylirii A.W.Ramaley (1995)
- Splanchnonema foedans (Fr.) Kuntze (1898)
- Splanchnonema hesperium (M.E.Barr) M.E.Barr (1993)
- Splanchnonema hicoria M.E.Barr (1982)
- Splanchnonema horizontale M.E.Barr (1993)
- Splanchnonema juglandis G.C.Zhao & R.L.Zhao (2012)
- Splanchnonema lichenisatum Aptroot & K.H.Moon (2014)
- Splanchnonema loricatum (Tul. & C.Tul.) M.E.Barr (1982)
- Splanchnonema maximum (Ellis & Everh.) M.E.Barr (1993)
- Splanchnonema melanterum (Ellis & Everh.) M.E.Barr (1982)
- Splanchnonema monospermum (Peck) M.E.Barr (1993)
- Splanchnonema mori (I.Miyake) Kaz. Tanaka, Y.Harada & M.E.Barr (2005)
- Splanchnonema nolinae A.W.Ramaley & M.E.Barr (1995)
- Splanchnonema phyllanthicola G.C.Zhao (2012)
- Splanchnonema platani M.E.Barr (1982)
- Splanchnonema pupula (Fr.) Kuntze (1898)
- Splanchnonema quinqueseptatum (M.E.Barr) Aptroot (1998)
- Splanchnonema scoriadeum (Fr.) M.E.Barr (1982)
- Splanchnonema semitectum (Berk. & M.A.Curtis) Kuntze (1898)
- Splanchnonema sporadicum (Ellis & Everh.) M.E.Barr (1982)
- Splanchnonema striatulum M.E.Barr (1993)
- Splanchnonema superans (Müll.Arg.) O.E.Erikss. (1981)
- Splanchnonema ulmicola (Fuckel) M.E.Barr (1993)
- Splanchnonema vaccinii M.E.Barr (1993)
- Splanchnonema verruculospora W.H. Hsieh, Chi Y.Chen & Sivan. (1997)
