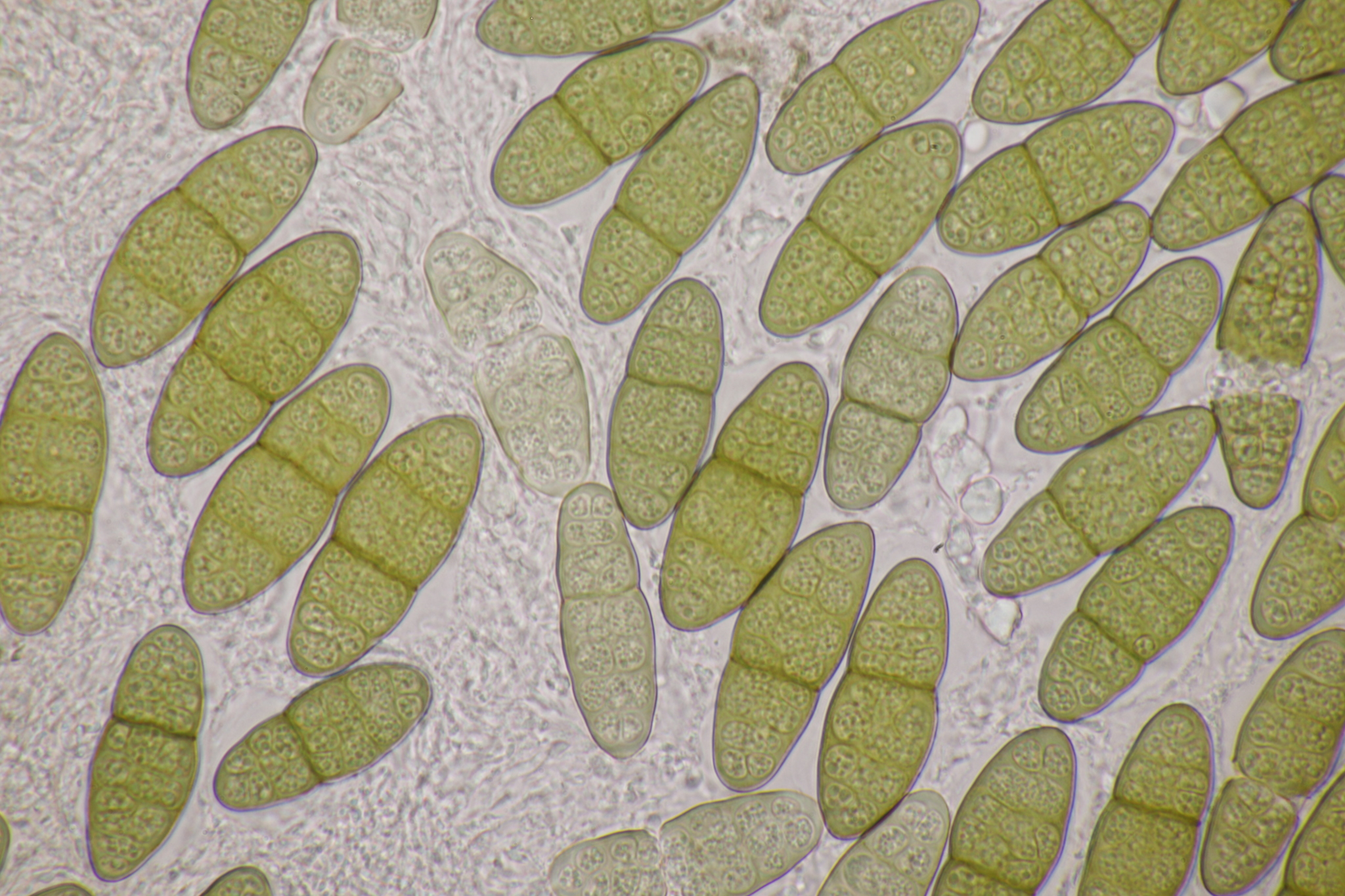

Scientific classification
- Kingdom: Fungi
- Division: Ascomycota
- Class: Dothideomycetes
- Order: Pleosporales
- Family: Pleomassariaceae
- Genus: Pleomassaria; Speg.

Type species
- Pleomassaria siparia (Berk. & Broome) Sacc.

= Pleomassaria =

Genus of fungi

Pleomassaria is a genus of fungi in the family Pleomassariaceae.

Its genome has been sequenced

== Species ==
As accepted by Species Fungorum;

- Pleomassaria acericola Petr. (1952)
- Pleomassaria ammophilae Oudem. (1894)
- Pleomassaria capparis Byzova (1987)
- Pleomassaria carpini (Fuckel) Sacc. (1883)
- Pleomassaria fagi Hüseyın (1989)
- Pleomassaria helvetica Petr. (1952)
- Pleomassaria holoschista (Berk. & Broome) Sacc. (1883)
- Pleomassaria luzonensis (Henn.) Teng (1964)
- Pleomassaria mali Frolov (1967)
- Pleomassaria melaleucae B. Huguenin (1964)
- Pleomassaria phoenicis S.D. Patil & C. Ramesh (1987)
- Pleomassaria robiniae Bubák (1906)
- Pleomassaria rosae Oudem. (1894)
- Pleomassaria siparia (Berk. & Broome) Sacc. (1883)
- Pleomassaria swidae Kaz. Tanaka, Y. Harada & M.E. Barr (2005)

Former species (most are still in Pleomassariaceae family);

- P. annonae Tilak, S.B. Kale & S.V.S. Kale (1970) = Splanchnonema annonae
- P. bauhiniae R. Rao (1972) = Splanchnonema bauhiniae
- P. hesperia M.E. Barr (1990) = Splanchnonema hesperium
- P. maxima Ellis & Everh. (1898) = Splanchnonema maximum
- P. monosperma (Peck) M.E. Barr (1982) = Splanchnonema monospermum
- P. rhodostoma (Alb. & Schwein.) G. Winter (1886) = Karstenula rhodostoma, Didymosphaeriaceae
- P. ulmicola (Fuckel) M.E. Barr (1982) = Splanchnonema ulmicola
