= Peridiothelia =

Scientific classification
- Kingdom: Fungi
- Division: Ascomycota
- Class: Dothideomycetes
- Order: Pleosporales
- Family: Pleomassariaceae
- Genus: Peridiothelia; D.Hawksw. (1985)

Type species
- Peridiothelia fuliguncta D.Hawksw. (1985)

Genus of fungi

Peridiothelia is a genus of fungi in the family Pleomassariaceae. Peridiothelia oleae is a little-known species found in Europe.

== Species ==
As accepted by Species Fungorum;

- Peridiothelia fuliguncta (Norman) D. Hawksw. (1985)
- Peridiothelia grandiuscula (Anzi) D. Hawksw. (1985)
- Peridiothelia oleae (Körb.) D. Hawksw. (1985)
