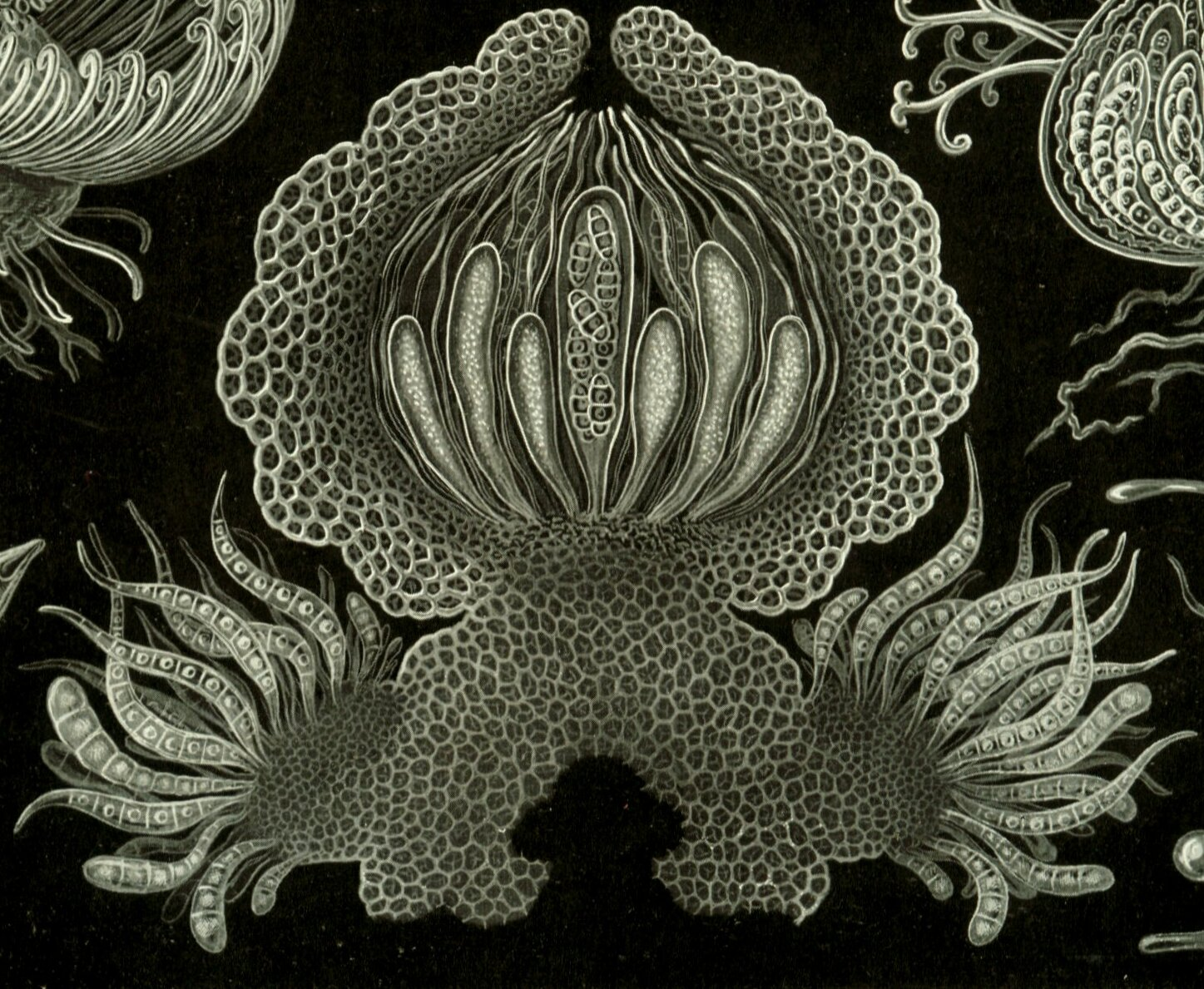
- Fruiting body of A. macrospora in lengthwise section

Scientific classification
- Kingdom: Fungi
- Division: Ascomycota
- Class: Dothideomycetes
- Order: Pleosporales
- Family: Pleomassariaceae
- Genus: Asteromassaria; Höhn.

Type species
- Asteromassaria macrospora (Desm.) Höhn.

= Asteromassaria =

Genus of fungi

Asteromassaria is a genus of fungi in the family Pleomassariaceae.
