= Pinchot Sycamore =

Exceptionally large American sycamore

Coordinates: 41.847492°N 72.806512°W

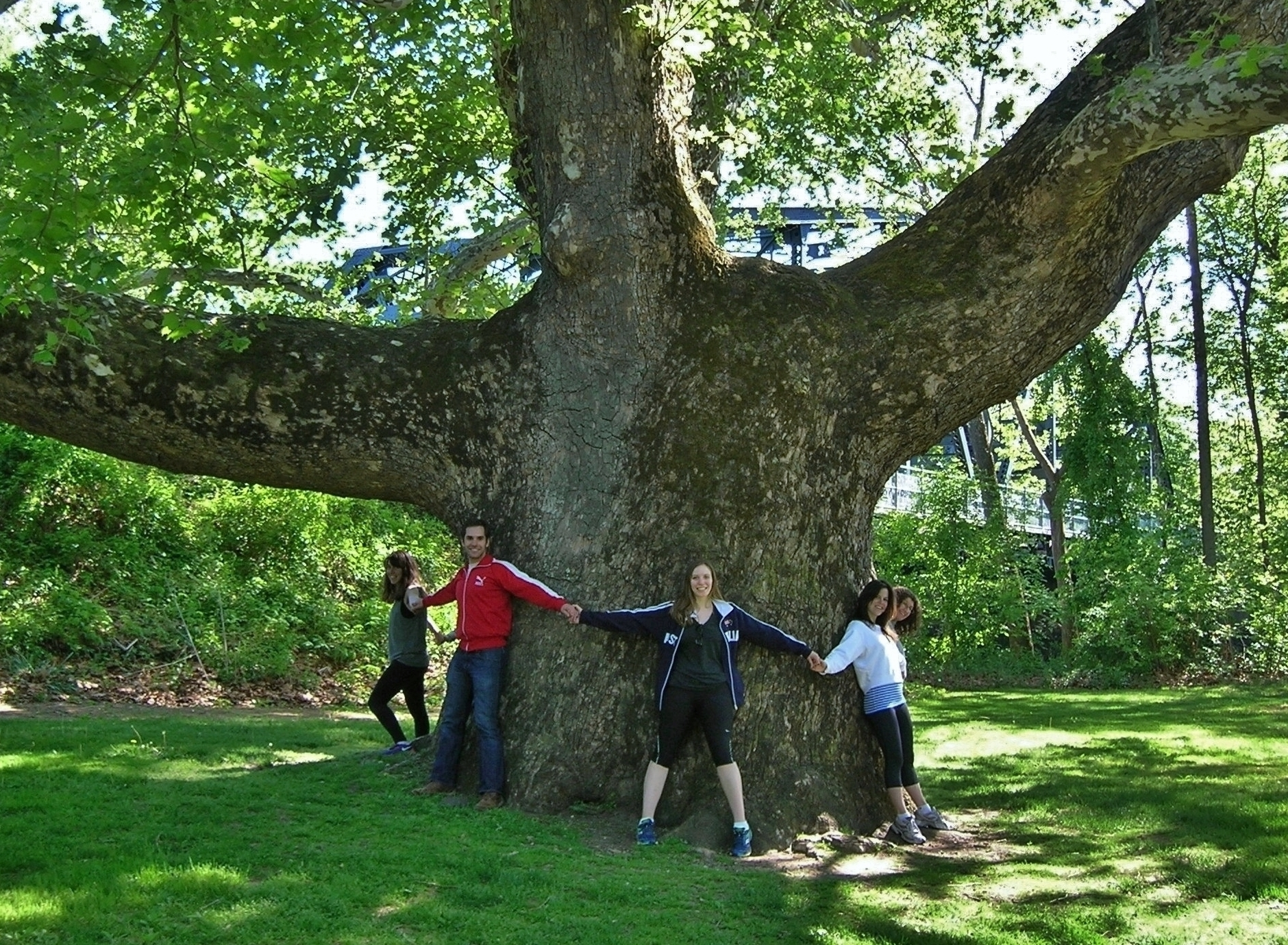
Pinchot Sycamore (May 2015)

The Pinchot Sycamore is a large American sycamore (Platanus occidentalis) in Simsbury, Connecticut. It is the largest tree in Connecticut. When measured by the Connecticut Botanical Society in 2016, the Pinchot Sycamore's trunk was over 28 feet (8.5 m) around and 100 feet (30 m) tall, with an average canopy diameter of 121 feet (37 m). The sycamore is estimated to be at least 200 years old, and possibly over 300 years old. The tree was named in honor of influential conservationist and Connecticut resident Gifford Pinchot. It was originally dedicated to Pinchot in 1965, and re-dedicated with an engraved stone marker in 1975.

The Pinchot Sycamore is located on the east bank of the Farmington River, near the base of Talcott Mountain, south of the town center of Simsbury. Since the completion of the Pinchot Sycamore Lighting Project by the town in 1997, the tree is lit by floodlights at night. The Pinchot Sycamore Park surrounds the tree; the park includes a launching point onto the Farmington River for small boats. It is a popular area for canoeing.

According to the conservation group American Forests in 2000, the Pinchot Sycamore was scheduled to be listed in the 2001 edition of the National Register of Big Trees as one of the two largest known American sycamores in the United States, tied with a tree in Bath County, Virginia. In the 2008-2009 edition, a larger tree in Ashland, Ohio is listed as the champion American sycamore.

In 2005, a guitar made from a fallen bough of the Pinchot Sycamore was auctioned off by the Farmington River Watershed Association. The Pinchot Sycamore sustained some damage to its canopy as a result of an early snowstorm in October 2011; however, it was not diminished in size, and its large recognizable lower limbs remain intact.

== Picture gallery ==
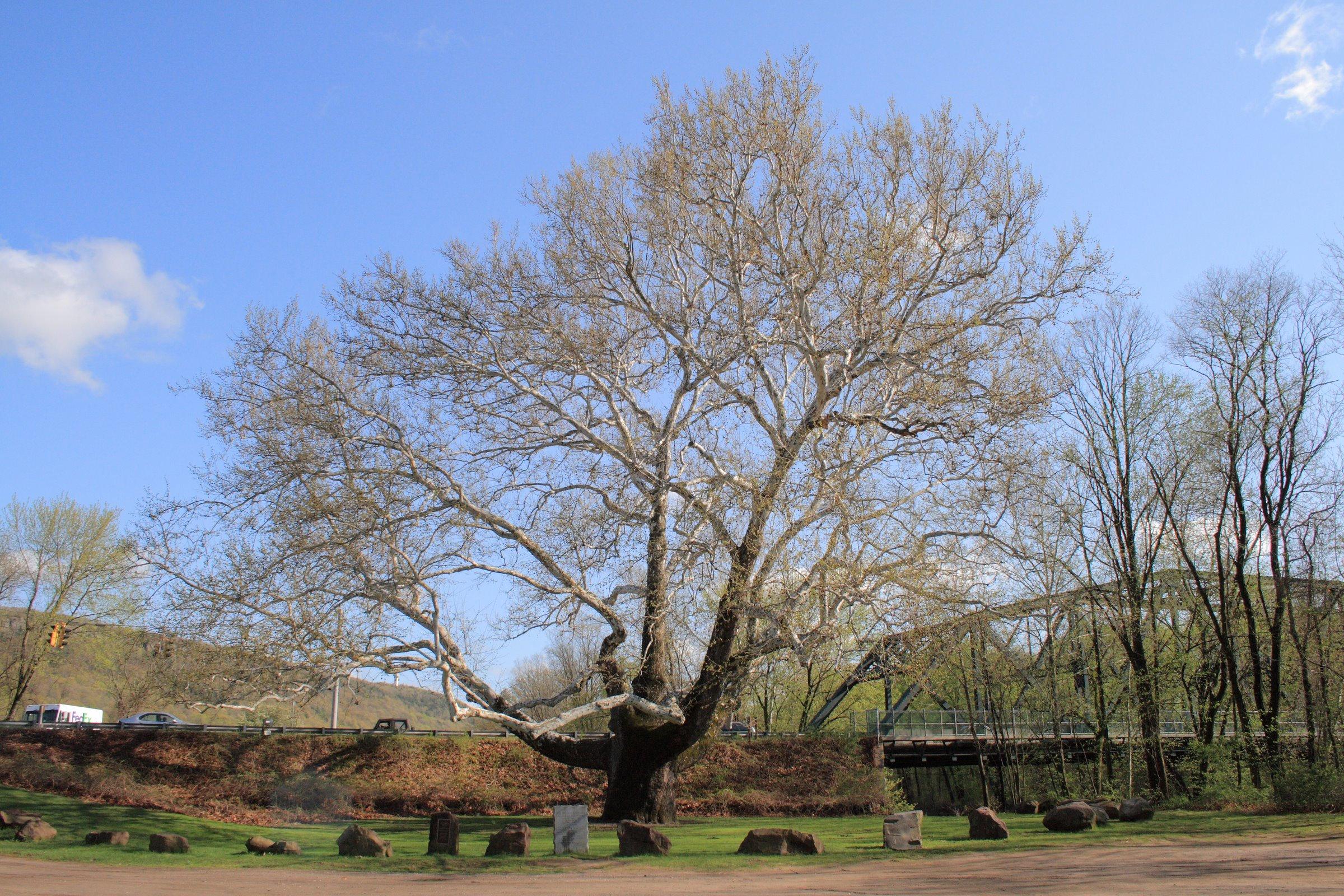
The Pinchot Sycamore, with Talcott Mountain on the left and a bridge over the Farmington River on the right.

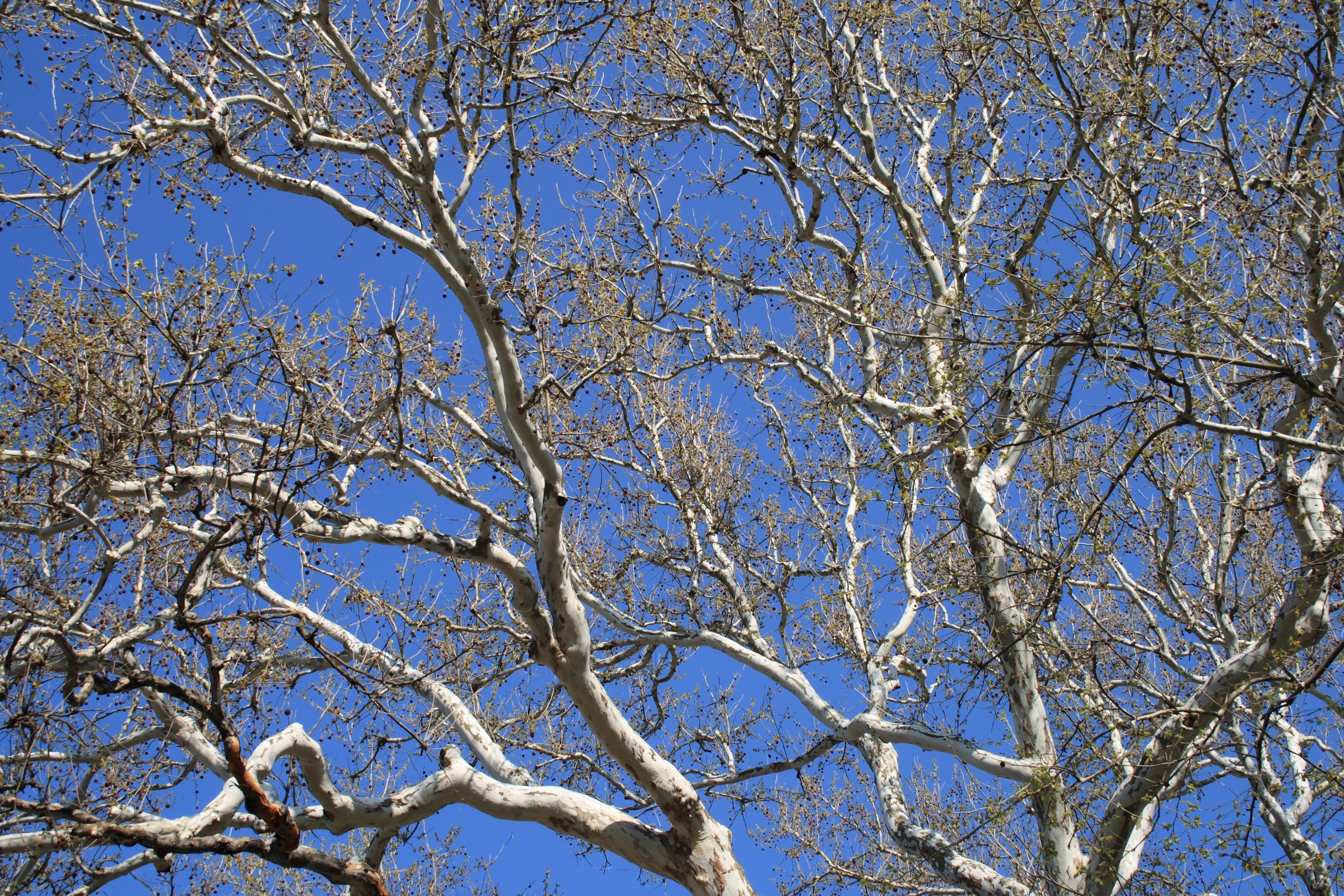
Foliage of the Pinchot Sycamore in spring.

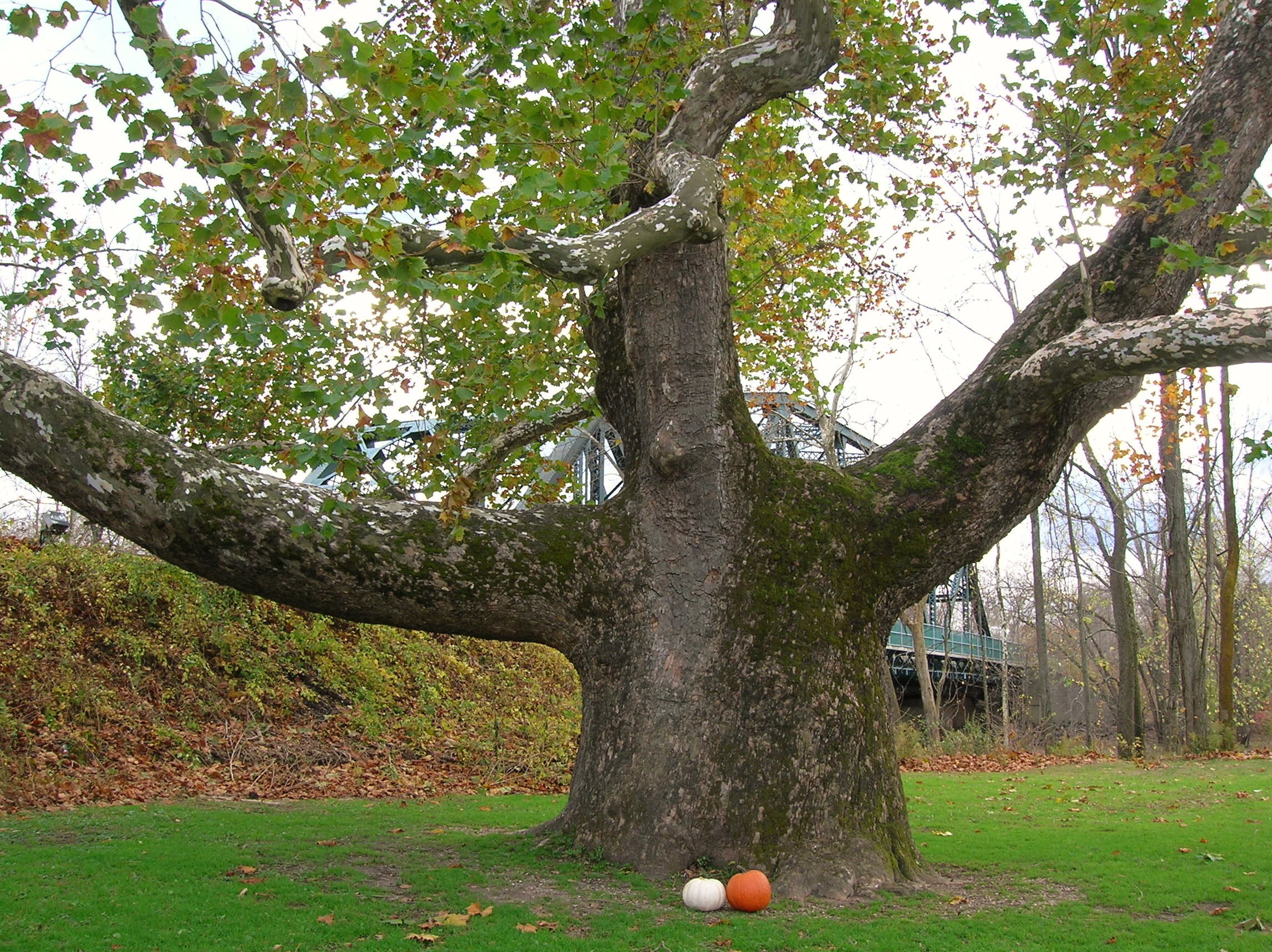
Pinchot Sycamore, Halloween 2012.

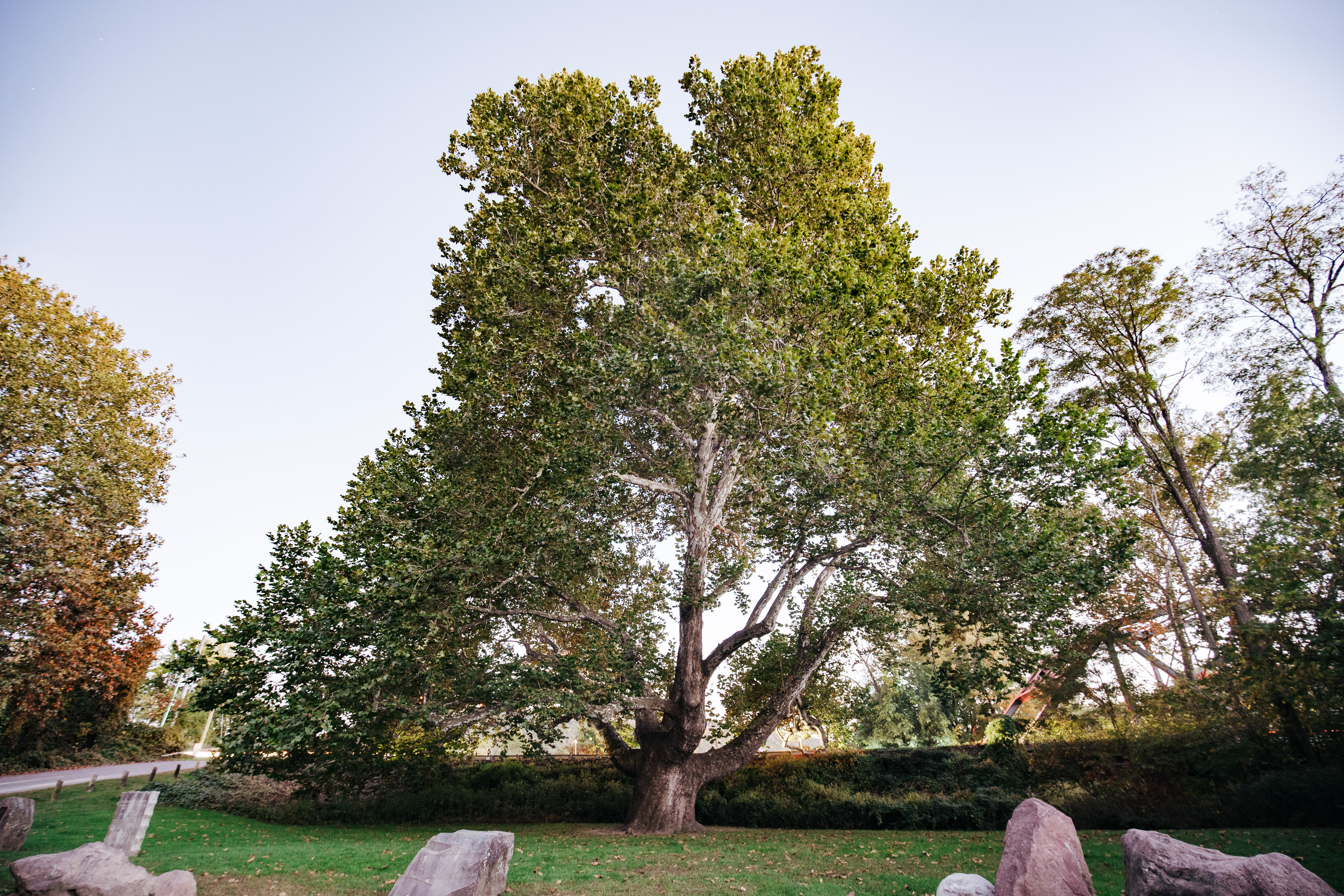
Pinchot Sycamore - October 5, 2024

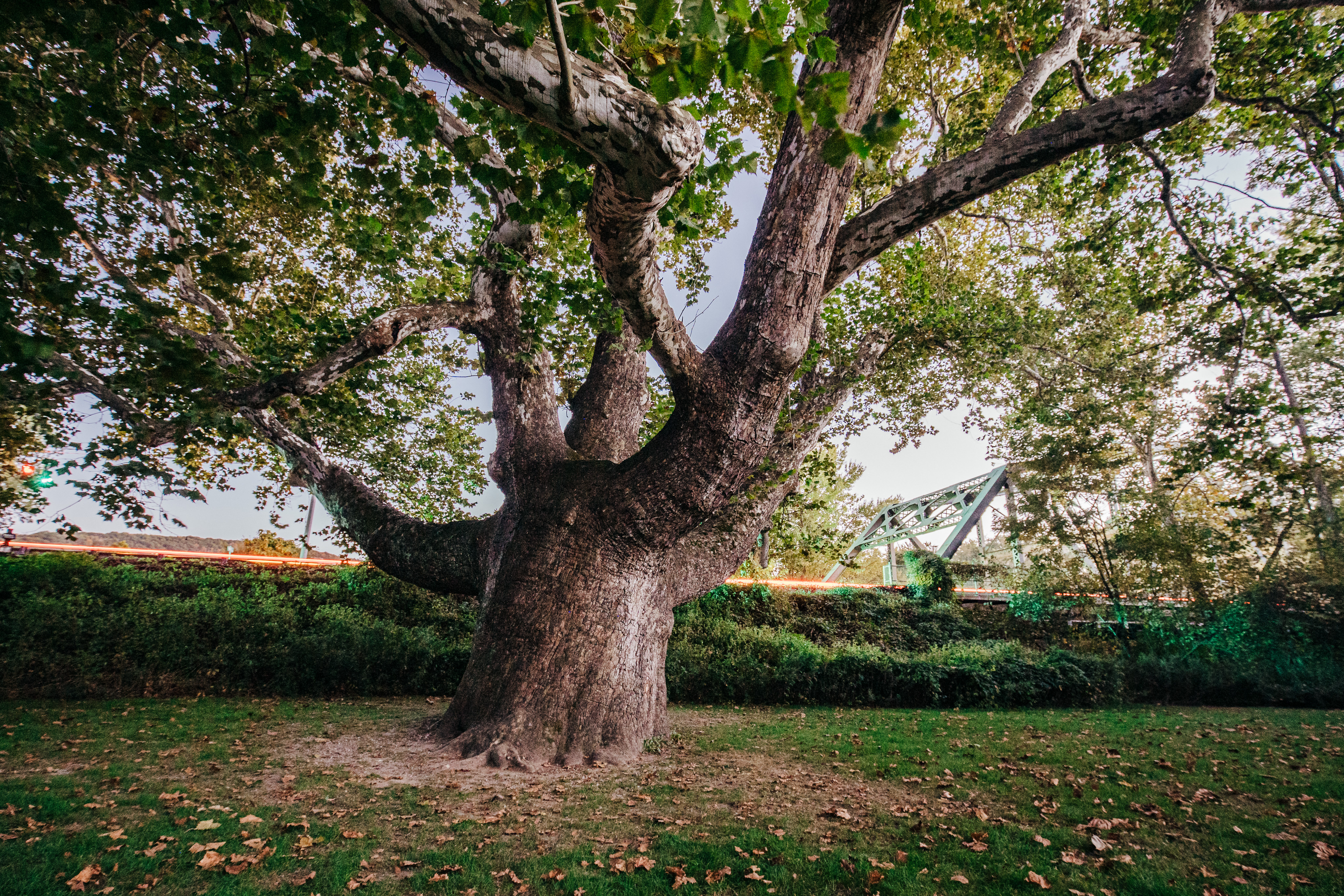
Pinchot Sycamore - October 5, 2024

== See also ==
- Buttonball Tree, an American Sycamore of similar size located in Sunderland, Massachusetts
- List of individual trees
