= Lichenopyrenis =

Scientific classification
- Kingdom: Fungi
- Division: Ascomycota
- Class: Dothideomycetes
- Order: Pleosporales
- Family: Pleomassariaceae
- Genus: Lichenopyrenis; Calatayud, Sanz & Aptroot

Type species
- Lichenopyrenis galligena Calat., M.J. Sanz & Aptroot

Genus of fungi

Lichenopyrenis is a genus of fungi in the family Pleomassariaceae. This is a monotypic genus, containing the single species Lichenopyrenis galligena. It was published in Mycol. Res. 105 (5) on page 636 in 2001.
