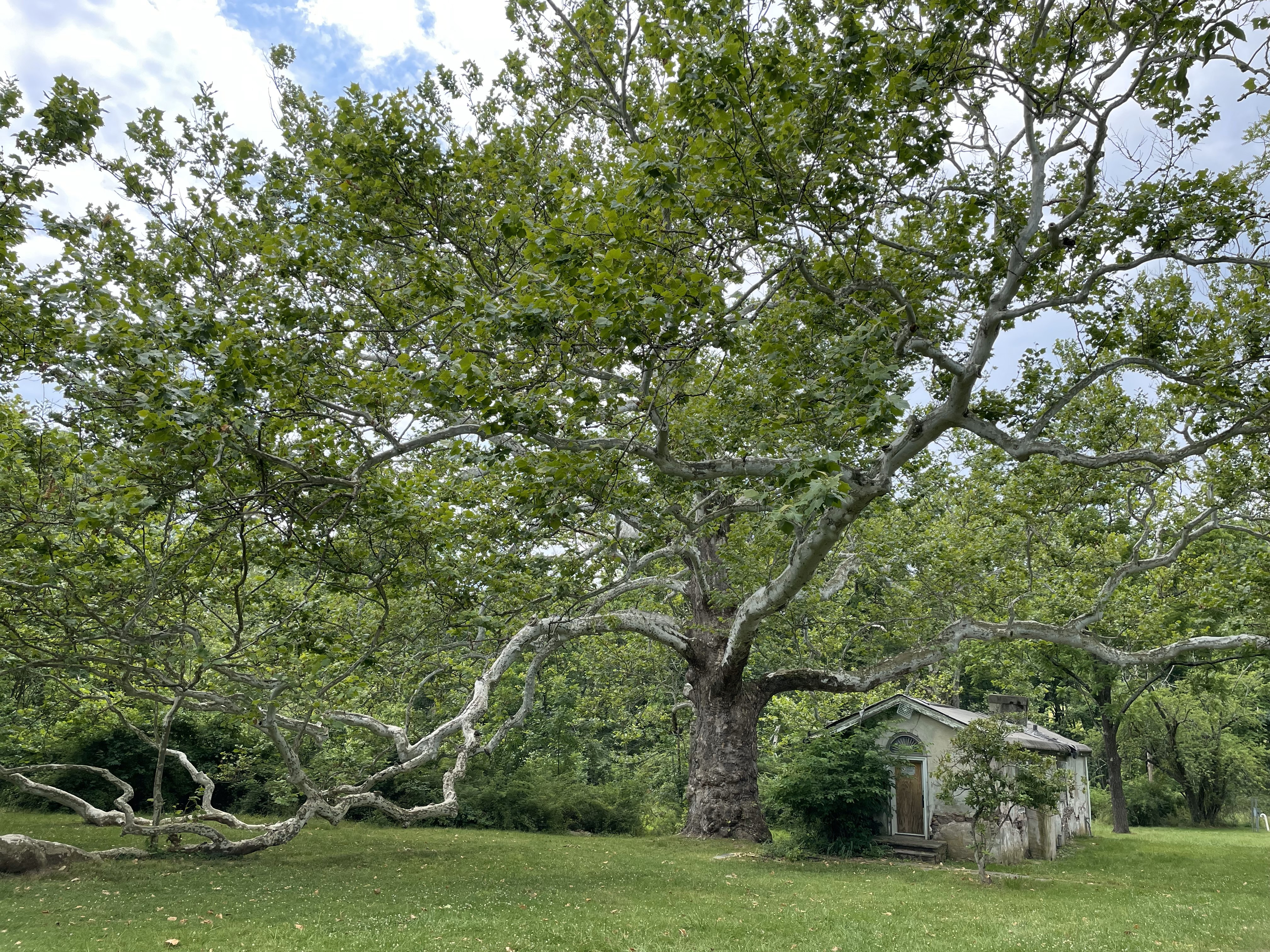
- Platanus occidentalis, Pawling Sycamore

Conservation status
- Least Concern (IUCN 3.1)

Scientific classification
- Kingdom: Plantae
- Clade: Tracheophytes
- Clade: Angiosperms
- Clade: Eudicots
- Order: Proteales
- Family: Platanaceae
- Genus: Platanus
- Species: P. occidentalis

Binomial name
- Platanus occidentalis L.
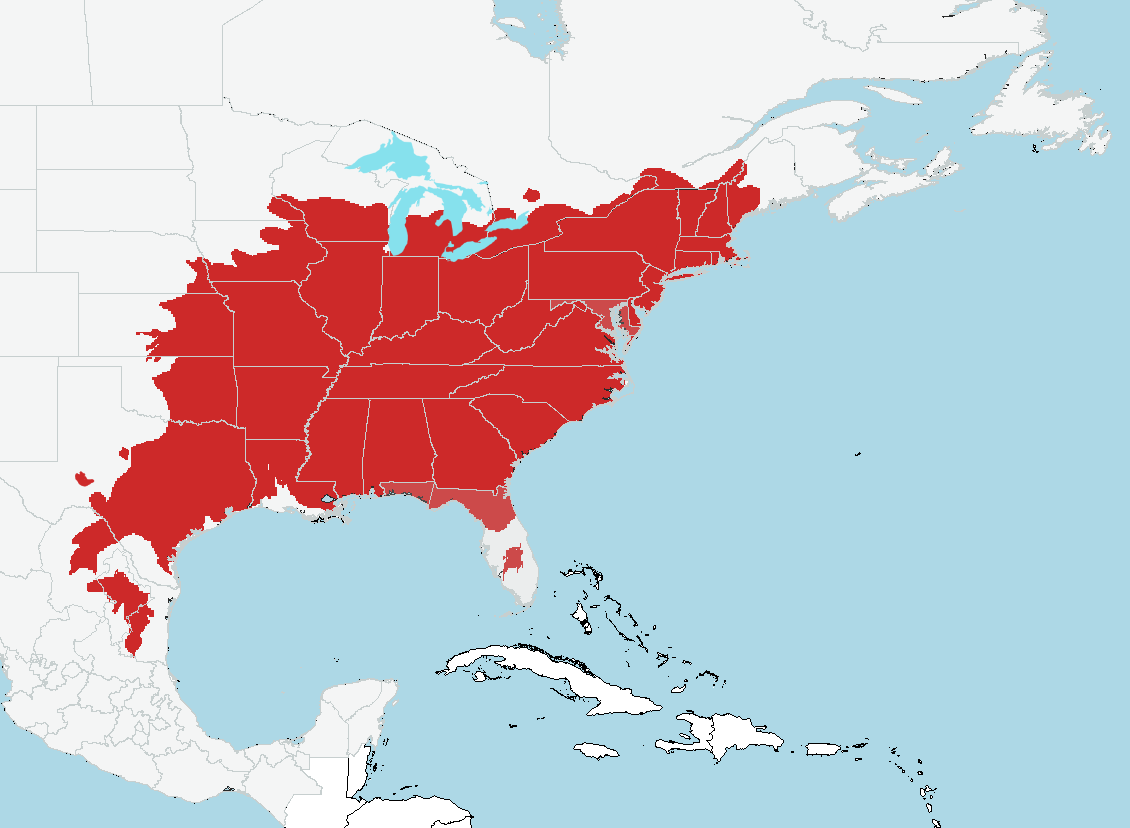
- Generalized natural range of Platanus occidentalis

= Platanus occidentalis =

American sycamore Temporal range: 4–0 Ma Neogene – present

Tree native to eastern North America

Platanus occidentalis, also known as American sycamore or American planetree, is a species of Platanus native to the eastern and central United States, the mountains of northeastern Mexico, extreme southern Ontario, and extreme southern Quebec. It is usually called sycamore in North America, a name which can refer to other types of trees in other parts of the world; in the United Kingdom, for example, the name sycamore typically refers to Acer pseudoplatanus. The American sycamore is a long-lived species, typically surviving at least 200 years and likely as long as 500–600 years. It is capable of becoming a massive tree, with a wide girth and heights reaching up to 24 m (80 ft) or more.

The species epithet occidentalis is Latin for "western", referring to the Western Hemisphere, because at the time when it was named by Carl Linnaeus, the only other species in the genus was P. orientalis ("eastern"), native to the Eastern Hemisphere. Confusingly, in the United States, this species was first known in the Eastern United States, thus it is sometimes called eastern sycamore, to distinguish it from Platanus racemosa, which was discovered later in the Western United States and called western sycamore.

The American sycamore is rather drought tolerant and flood tolerant. It can be found in a variety of habitats, but it prefers wetlands and riparian environments.

== Description ==
Platanus occidentalis can often be easily distinguished from other trees by its mottled bark that flakes off in large, irregular masses, leaving the surface mottled and gray, greenish-white, and brown. The bark of all trees has to yield to a growing trunk by stretching, splitting, or infilling, but sycamore bark is more rigid and less elastic than the bark of other trees, so to accommodate the growth of the wood underneath, the tree sheds it in large, brittle pieces.

A sycamore can grow to massive proportions, typically reaching up to 30 to 40 m (98 to 131 ft) high and 1.5 to 2 m (4.9 to 6.6 ft) in diameter when grown in deep soils. The largest of the species have been measured to 53 m (174 ft), and nearly 4 m (13 ft) in diameter. Larger specimens were recorded in historical times. In 1744, a Shenandoah Valley settler named Joseph Hampton and two sons lived for most of the year in a hollow sycamore in what is now Clarke County, Virginia. In 1770, at Point Pleasant, Virginia (now in West Virginia), near the junction of the Kanawha and Ohio Rivers, George Washington recorded in his journal a sycamore measuring 13.67 m (44 ft 10 in) in circumference at 91 cm (3 ft) from the ground.

The sycamore tree is often divided near the ground into several secondary trunks, very free from branches. Spreading limbs at the top make an irregular, open head. Roots are fibrous. The trunks of large trees are often hollow.

Another peculiarity is the way the leaves grow sticky, green buds. In early August, most trees have tiny buds nestled in the axils of their leaves, which produce the leaves of the coming year. The sycamore branch apparently has no such buds. Instead, an enlargement of the petiole encloses the bud in a tight-fitting case at the base of the petiole.

- Bark: Dark reddish brown, broken into oblong, plate-like scales; higher on the tree, it is smooth and light gray; separates freely into thin plates which peel off and leave the surface pale yellow, or white, or greenish. Branchlets at first pale green, coated with thick pale tomentum, later dark green and smooth, finally become light gray or light reddish brown.
- Wood: Light brown, tinged with red; heavy, weak, difficult to split. Largely used for furniture and interior finish of houses, butcher's blocks. Specific gravity, 0.5678; relative density, 0.53724 g/cm^{3} (33.539 lb/cu ft).
- Winter buds: Large, stinky, sticky, green, and three-scaled, they form in summer within the petiole of the full-grown leaf. The inner scales enlarge with the growing shake. There is no terminal bud.
- Leaves: Alternate, palmately nerved, broadly ovate or orbicular, 10 to 23 cm (4 to 9 in) long, truncate or cordate or wedge-shaped at base, decurrent on the petiole. Three to five-lobed by broad shallow sinuses rounded in the bottom; lobes acuminate, toothed, or entire, or undulate. They come out of the bud plicate, pale green coated with pale tomentum; when full grown are bright yellow green above, paler beneath. In autumn they turn brown and wither before falling. Petioles long, abruptly enlarged at base and inclosing the buds. Stipules with spreading, toothed borders, conspicuous on young shoots, caducous.
- Flowers: May, with the leaves; monoecious, borne in dense heads. Staminate and pistillate heads on separate peduncles. Staminate heads dark red, on axillary peduncles; pistillate heads light green tinged with red, on longer terminal peduncles. Calyx of staminate flowers three to six, tiny, scale-like sepals, slightly united at the base, half as long as the pointed petals. Of pistillate flowers three to six, usually four, rounded sepals, much shorter than the acute petals. Corolla of three to six, thin, scale-like petals.
- Stamens: In staminate flowers as many of the divisions of the calyx and opposite to them; filaments short; anthers elongated, two-celled; cells opening by lateral slits; connectives hairy.
- Pistil: Ovary superior, one-celled, sessile, ovate-oblong, surrounded at base by long, jointed, pale hairs; styles long, incurved, red, stigmatic, ovules one or two.
- Fruit: Brown heads, solitary or rarely clustered, 2.5 cm (1 in) in diameter, hanging on slender stems 3-6 inches long; persistent through the winter. These heads are composed of achenes about 2/3 inch in length.
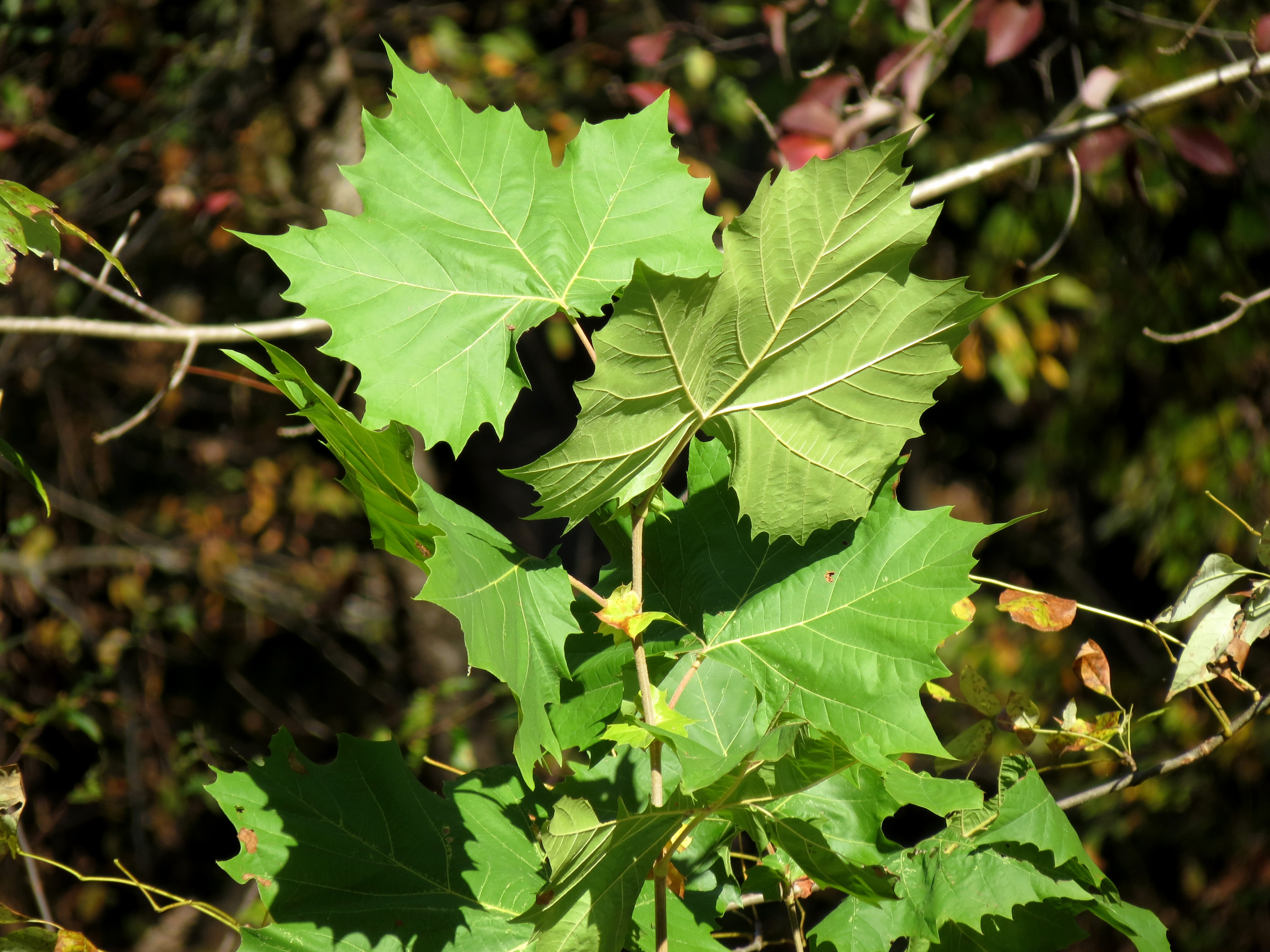
American sycamore leaves are broader and have shallower sinuses than P. orientalis

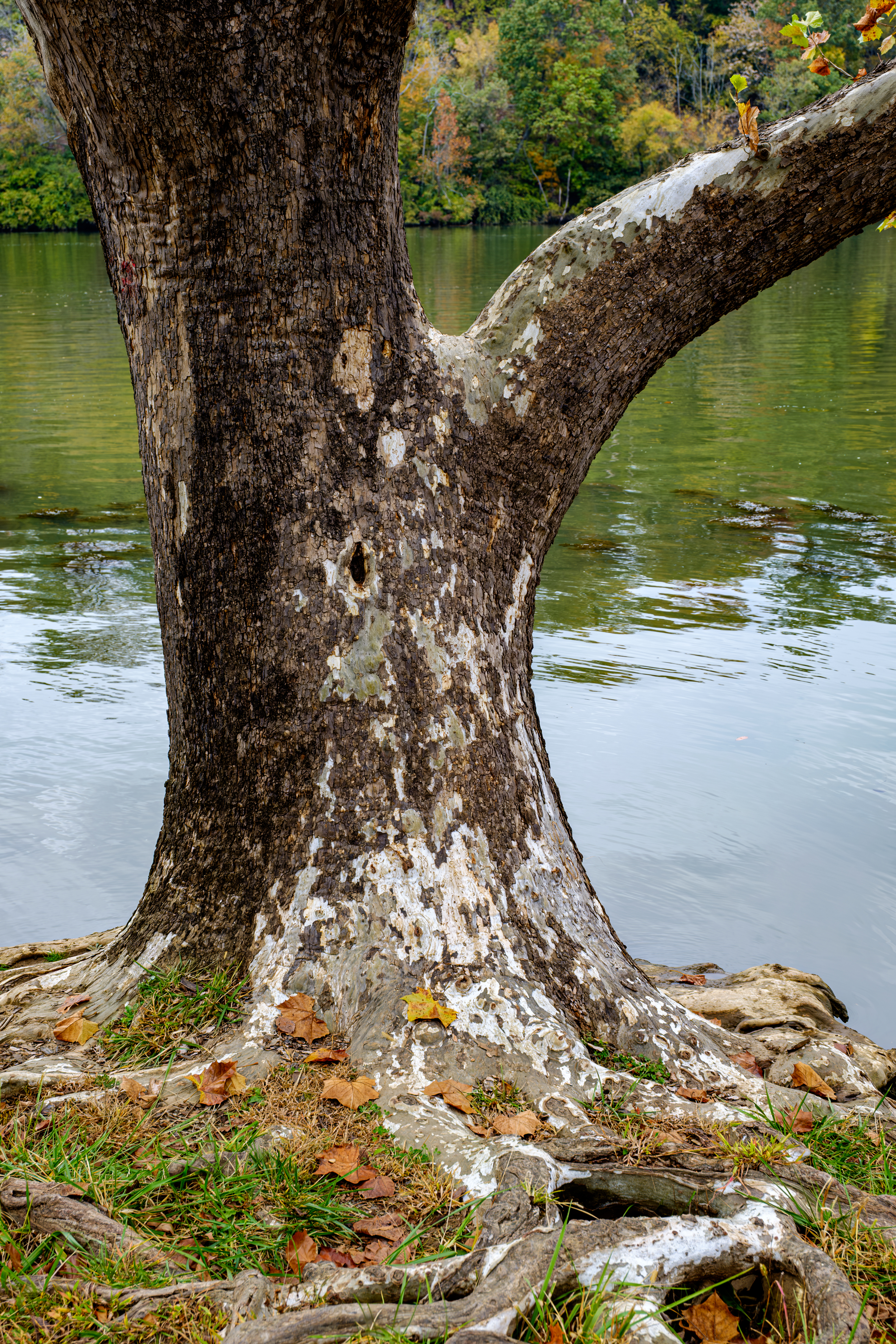
Typical bark showing white patches

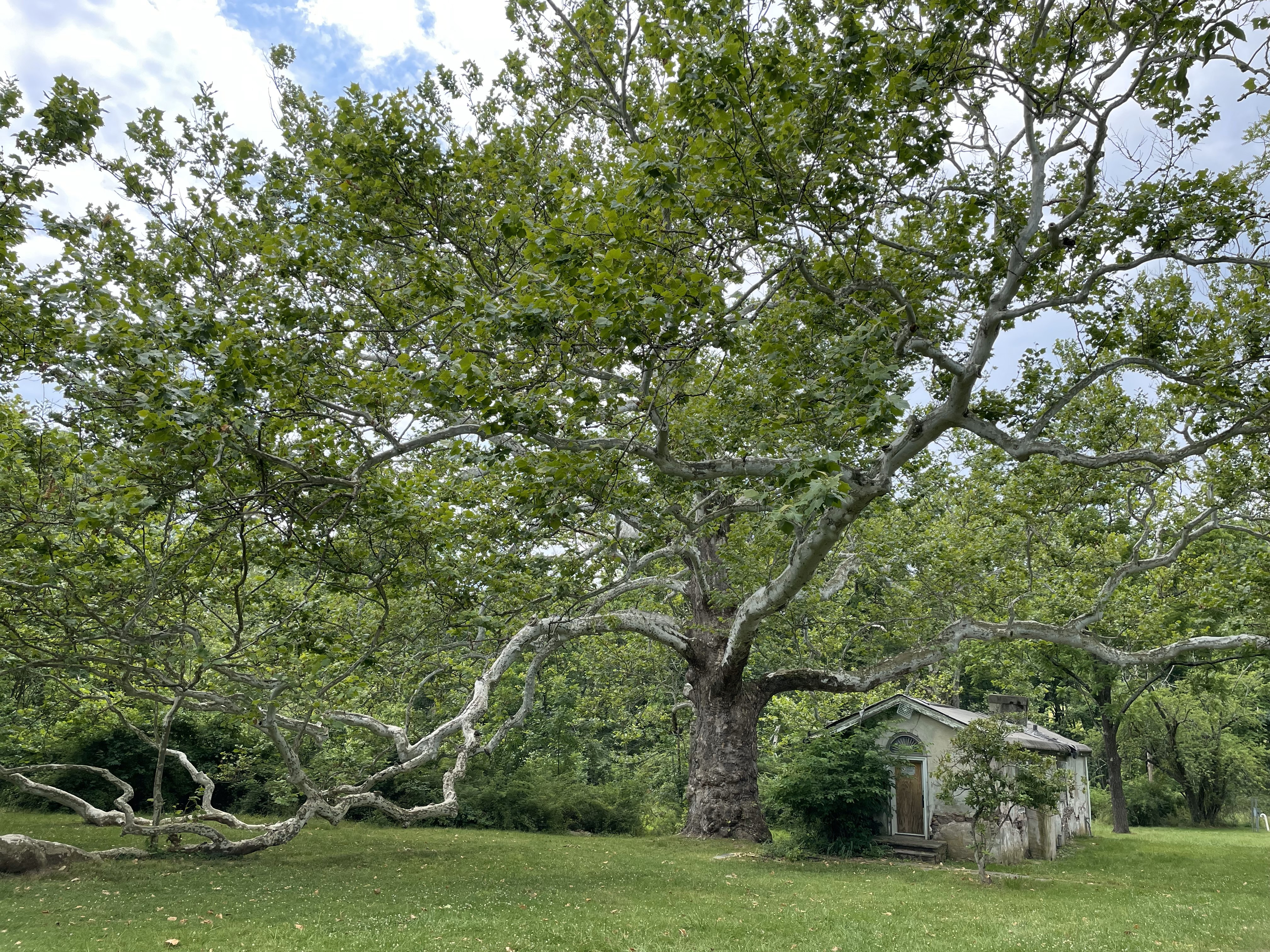
Mature specimens can have massive, broad crowns

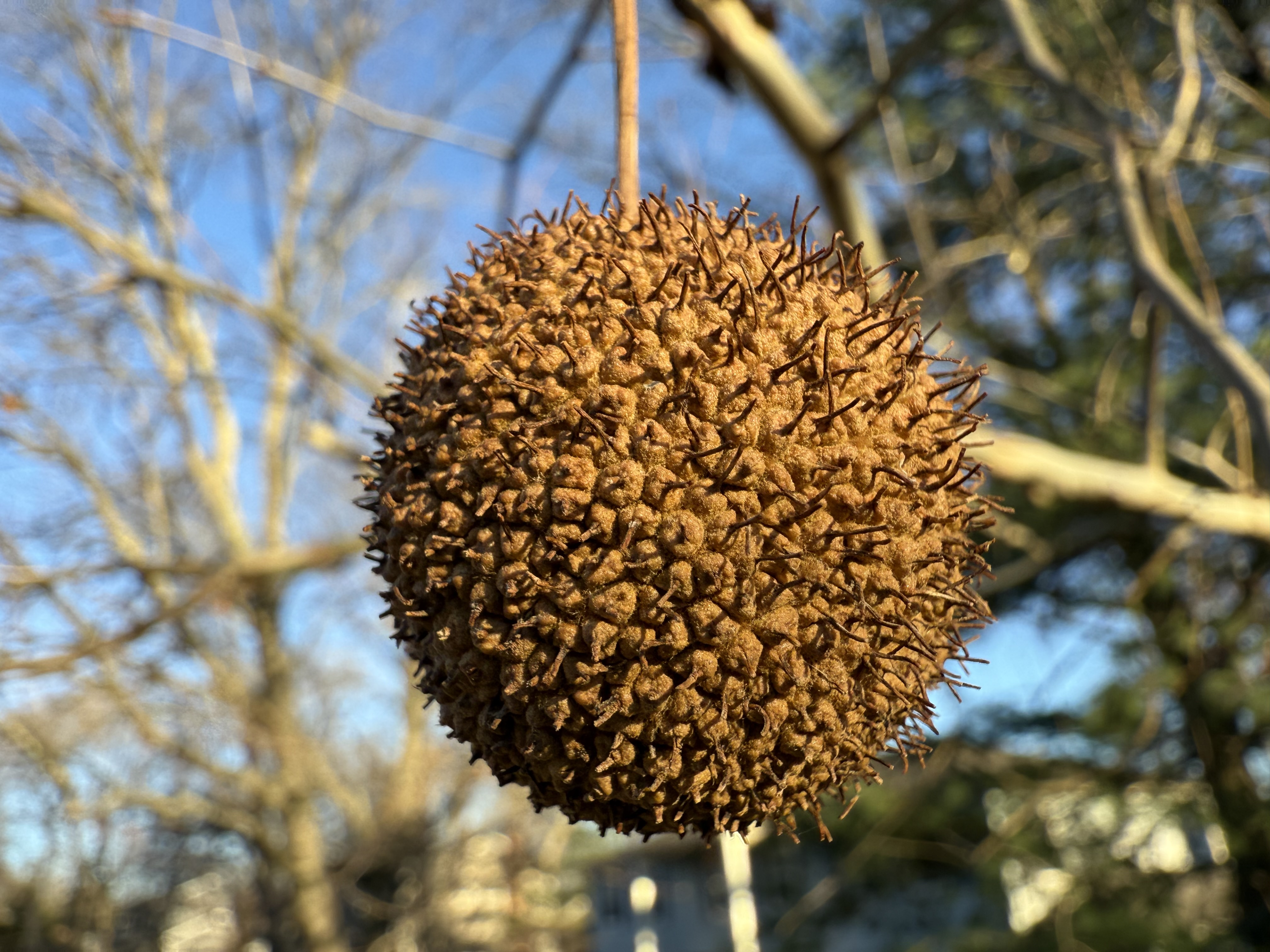
Detail of the infructescence, containing densely packed achene

== Distribution ==
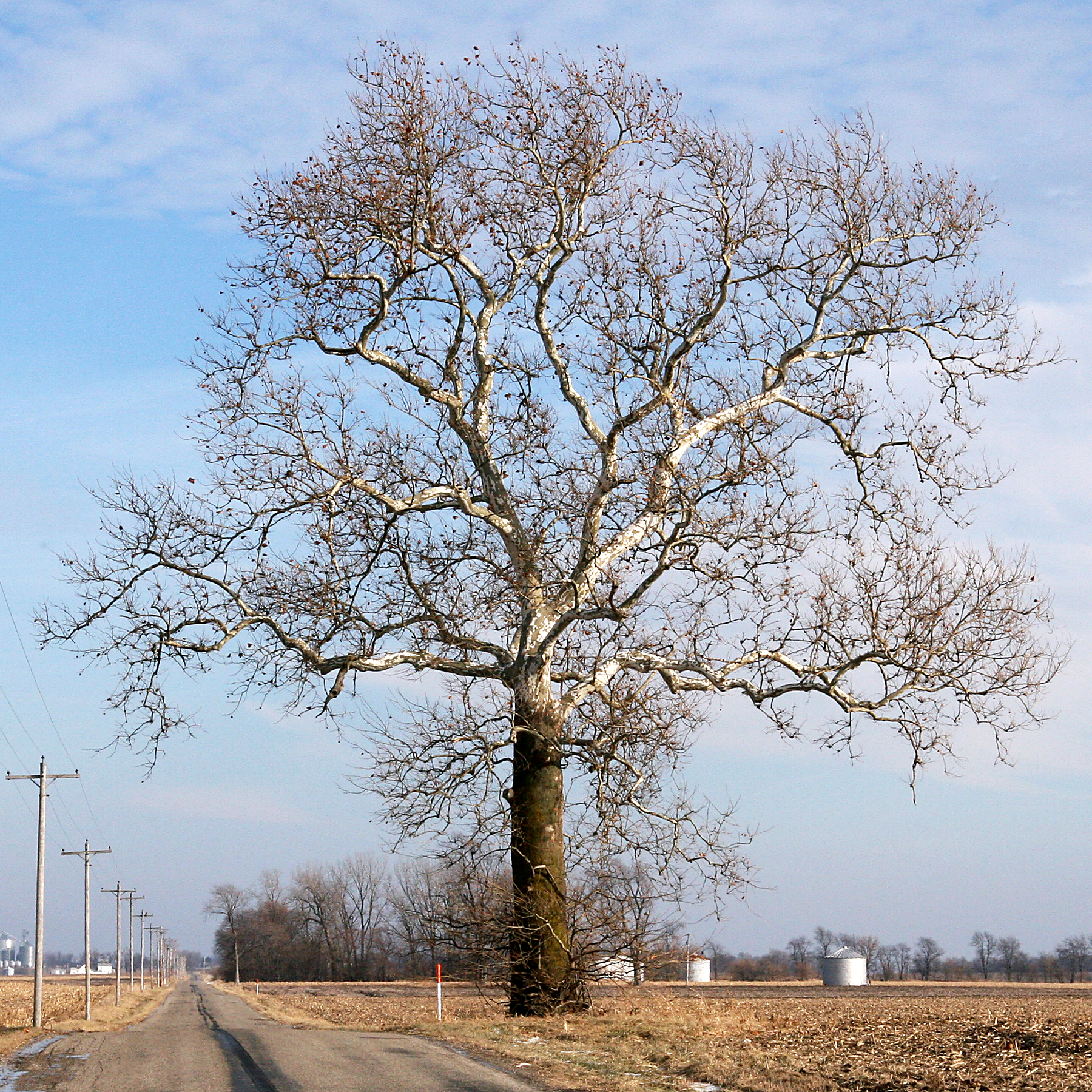
The American sycamore is found throughout eastern United States

In its native range, it is often found in riparian and wetland areas. The range extends from Iowa to Ontario and New Hampshire in the north, Nebraska in the west, and south to Texas and Florida. It is apparently extirpated from Maine. It can be found in southeastern Minnesota. Closely related species (see Platanus) occur in Mexico and the southwestern states of the United States. It is sometimes grown for timber and has become naturalized in some areas outside its native range. It can be found growing successfully in Bismarck, North Dakota, and it is sold as far south as Okeechobee. The American sycamore is also well adapted to life in Argentina and Australia and is quite widespread across the Australian continent, especially in the cooler southern states such as Victoria and New South Wales.

== Ecology ==
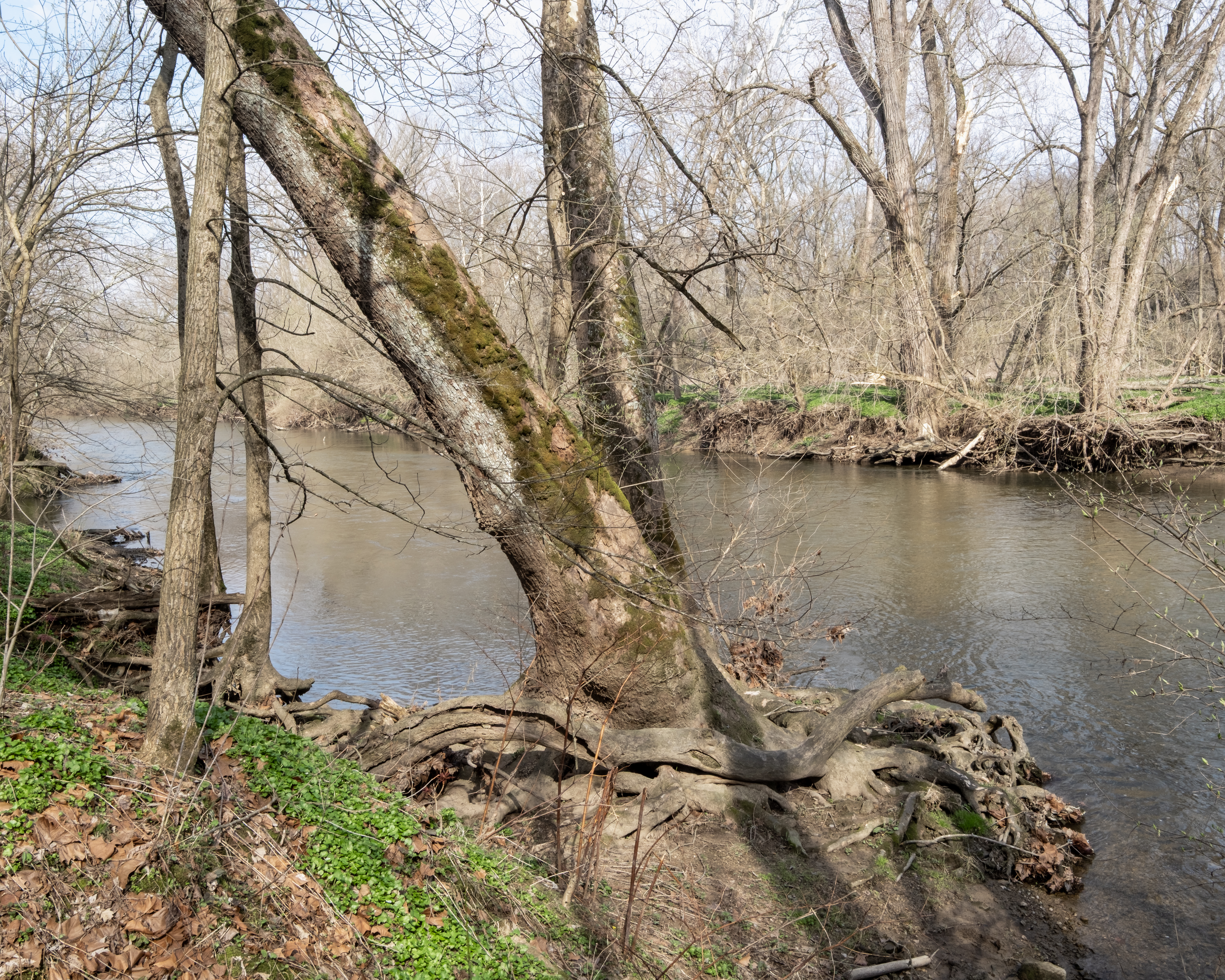
American sycamore in typical habitat along a riverbank

American sycamore is found most commonly in bottomland or floodplain areas, thriving in the wet environments provided by rivers, streams, or abundant groundwater, though it will die after being flooded for more than two weeks at a time. It is a fast-growing, early-mid successional hardwood tree species. Its life cycle follows the pattern of a "weedy" species: it grows mature enough to reproduce rather young and produces large numbers of wind-distributed seeds. The dominance of sycamore in a forest depends on the conditions where it grows; it is often a pioneer species, but in the wet sites that are most ideal for it, it persists as a subclimax to climax species, partly because of its fast growth and very long lifespan.

As one of the largest trees in the wet bottomland habitats where it dominates, it is a key component of the structure of those habitats. The heartwood of a sycamore tree decays quickly, producing large hollow cavities in the center of the trees which are used by many animals as nesting sites. The largest hollow trees can be big enough for black bear dens, but average trees create homes for bats and cavity-nesting birds like wood ducks, barred owls, screech owls, chimney swift, and great-crested flycatcher.

=== As host plant ===
American sycamore is the host plant of the sycamore tussock moth, a species that specializes in it, and a major host plant for the drab prominent moth. This plant is also the first host known for Plagiognathus albatus.

== Uses ==
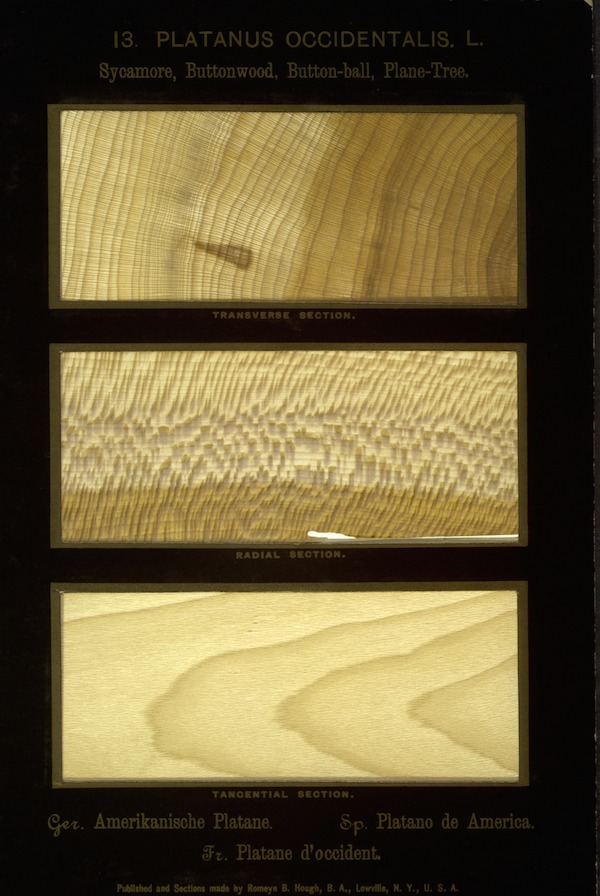
Wood of P. occidentalis from Romeyn Beck Hough's 14-volume work The American Woods, a collection of over 1000 paper-thin wood samples representing more than 350 varieties of North American trees

The American sycamore is able to endure a big-city environment and was formerly extensively planted as a shade tree, but due to the defacing effects of anthracnose, it has been largely usurped in this function by the resistant London plane.

Its wood has been used extensively for butcher's blocks. It has been used for boxes and crates; although coarse-grained and difficult to work, it has also been used to make furniture, siding, and musical instruments.

Investigations have been made into its use as a biomass crop.

=== Use by Native Americans ===
The tree bark has traditionally been used by Native Americans to make little dishes for gathering whortleberries.

== Pests and diseases ==
The American sycamore is a favored food plant of the pest sycamore leaf beetle.

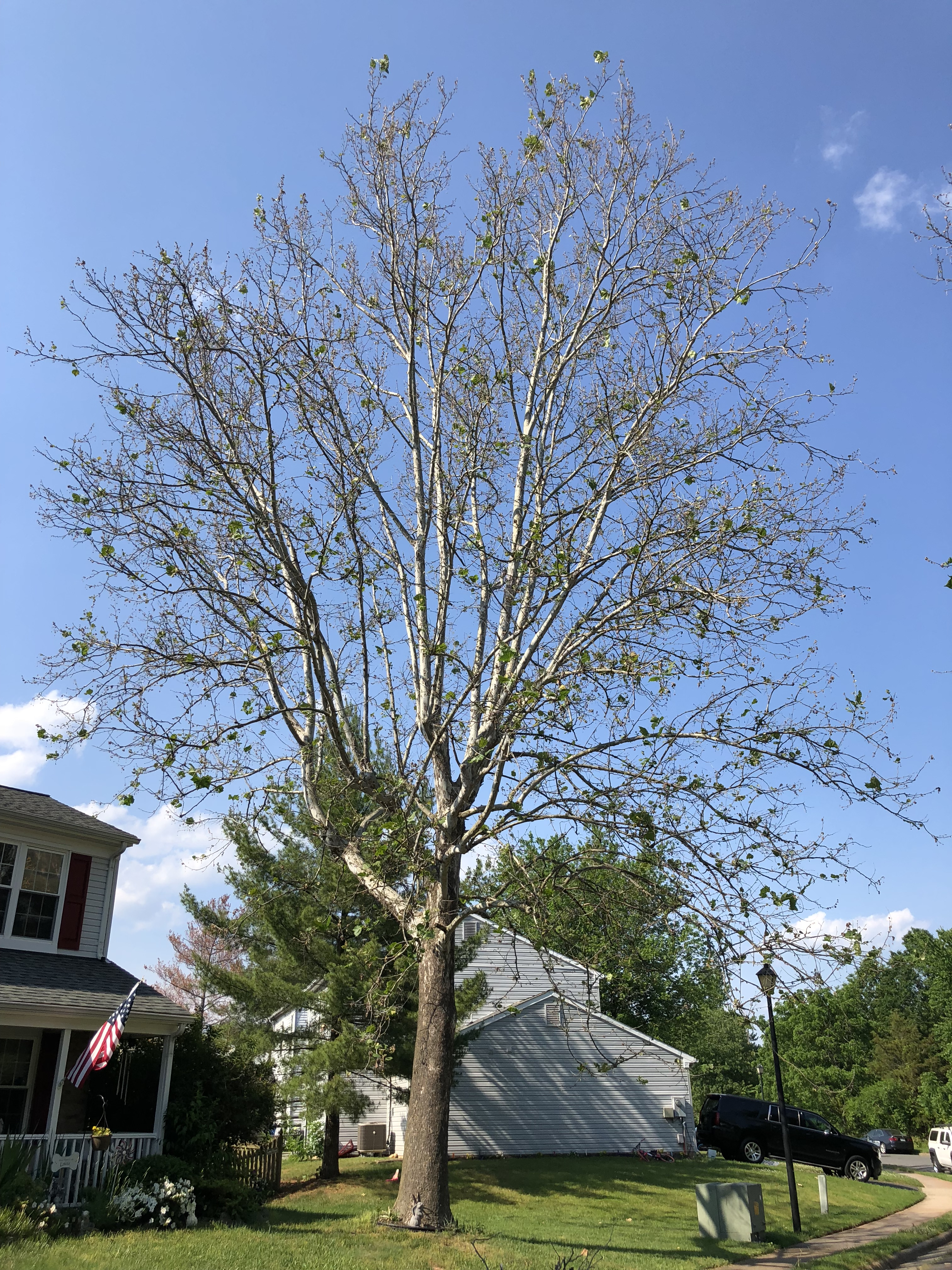
Severe infections of anthracnose can sometimes defoliate large swaths of sycamore during mid- and late spring, but trees generally recover by mid-summer

American sycamore is susceptible to plane anthracnose disease (Apiognomonia veneta, syn. Gnomonia platani), an introduced fungus found naturally on the Oriental plane P. orientalis, which has evolved considerable resistance to the disease. Although rarely killed or even seriously harmed, American sycamore is commonly partially defoliated by the disease, rendering it unsightly as a specimen tree.

Sometimes mistaken for frost damage, the disease manifests in early spring, wilting new leaves and causing mature leaves to turn brown along the veins. Infected leaves typically shrivel and fall, so that by summer, the tree is regrowing its foliage. Cankers form on twigs and branches near infected leaves, serving to spread the disease by spore production and also weakening the tree. Because cankers restrict the flow of nutrients, twigs and branches afflicted by cankers eventually die. Witch's broom is a symptom reflecting the cycle of twigs dying.

As a result of the fungus' damage, American sycamore is often avoided as a landscape tree, and the more resistant London plane (P. × hispanica; hybrid P. occidentalis × P. orientalis) is planted, instead.

== History ==
The terms under which the New York Stock Exchange was formed are called the "Buttonwood Agreement", because it was signed under a buttonwood (sycamore) tree at 68 Wall Street, New York City in 1792.

The sycamore made up a large part of the forests of Greenland and Arctic America during the Cretaceous and Tertiary periods. It once grew abundantly in central Europe, from which it has now disappeared. It was brought to Europe early in the 17th century.

== See also ==
- Buttonball Tree, an American sycamore, said to be the largest on the East Coast, located in Sunderland, Massachusetts
- Pinchot Sycamore, an American sycamore that is the largest tree in Connecticut
- Webster Sycamore, formerly the largest American sycamore in West Virginia
- Sycamore maple or European sycamore (Acer pseudoplatanus), a maple which is visually very similar to sycamore
