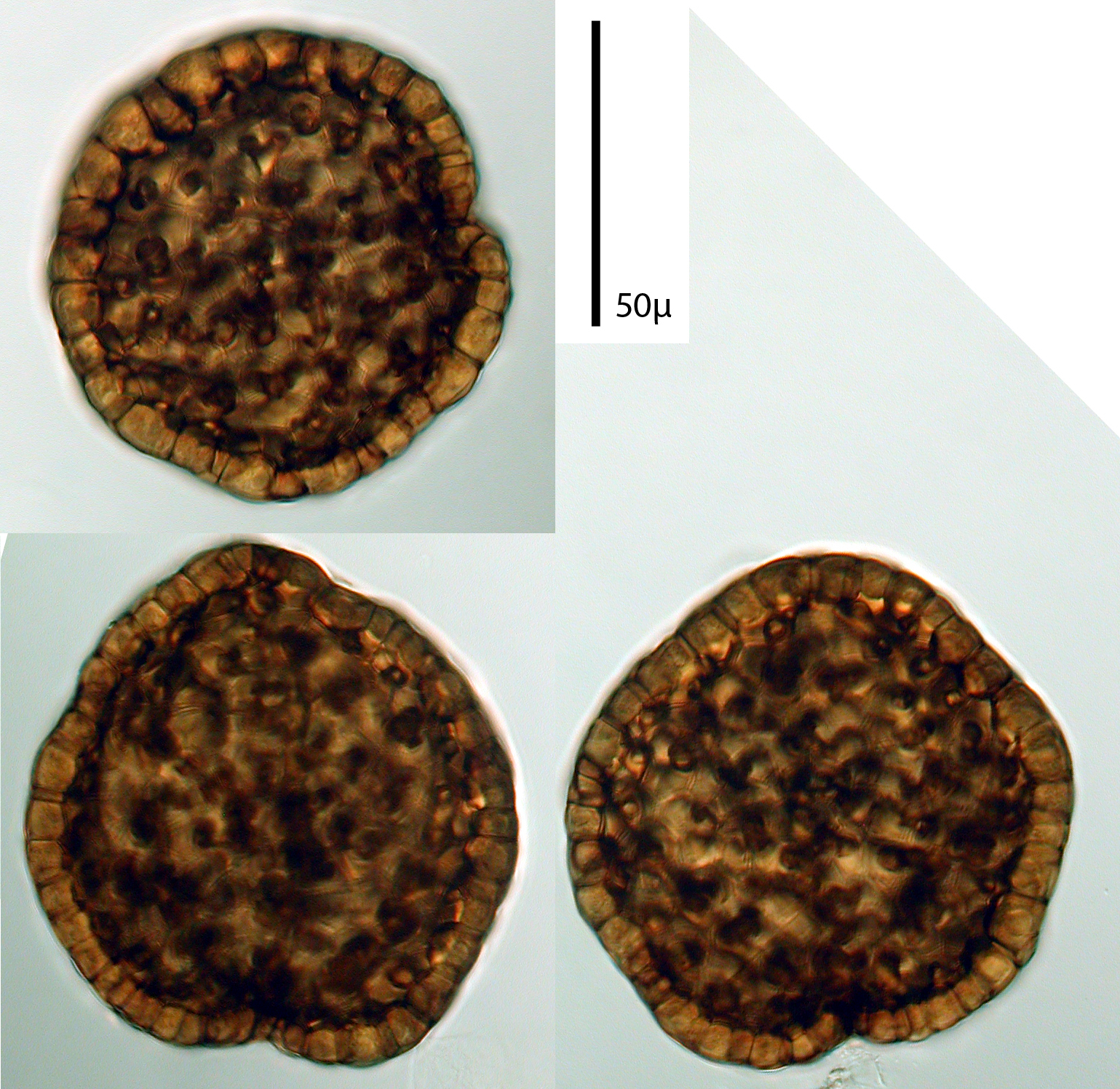
- Beverwykella pulmonaria

Scientific classification
- Kingdom: Fungi
- Division: Ascomycota
- Class: Dothideomycetes
- Order: Pleosporales
- Family: Pleomassariaceae; M.E.Barr (1979)

Type genus
- Pleomassaria Speg. (1880)

Genera
- Beverwykella; Lichenopyrenis; Myxocyclus; Peridiothelia; Pleomassaria; Prosthemium; Splanchnonema

= Pleomassariaceae =

Family of fungi

The Pleomassariaceae are a family of fungi in the order Pleosporales. Taxa have a widespread distribution in both temperate and tropical regions, and are saprobic or necrotrophic on wood, bark, and other herbaceous material. The genus was circumscribed by mycologist Margaret Elizabeth Barr-Bigelow in 1979.

== Genera ==
This is a list of the genera in the Pleomassariaceae, based on a 2021 review and summary of fungal classification by Wijayawardene and colleagues. Following the genus name is the taxonomic authority (those who first circumscribed the genus; standardized author abbreviations are used), year of publication, and the number of species:

- Asteromassaria
- Beverwykella Tubaki (1975) – 3 spp.
- Lichenopyrenis Calat., Sanz & Aptroot (2001) – 1 sp.
- Myxocyclus Riess (1852) – 1 sp.
- Peridiothelia D. Hawksw. (1985) – 3 spp.
- Pleomassaria Speg. (1880) – 15 spp.
- Prosthemium Kunze (1817) – ca. 8 spp.
- Splanchnonema Corda (1829) – 37 spp.
